= George Ellsworth =

Confederate-American telegraphist

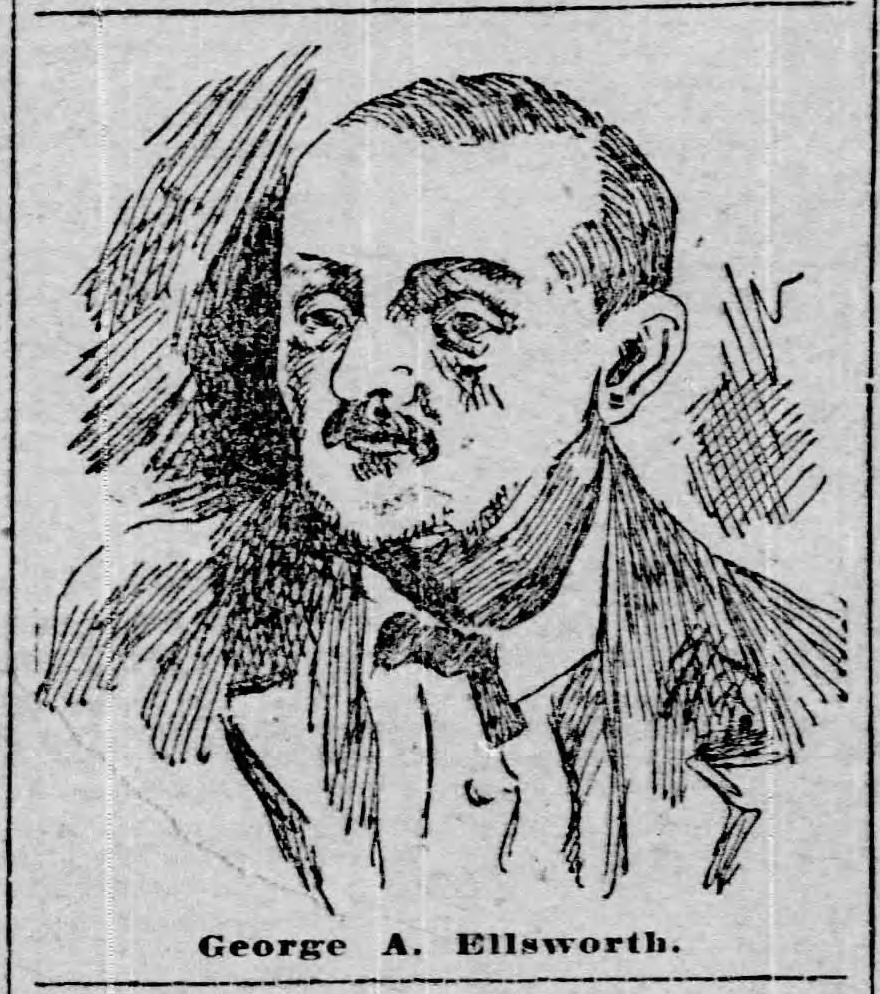
- George A. Ellsworth "Morgan's Telegraph Operator", (Memphis Commercial Appeal, July 2, 1897)
- Born: July 24, 1843; Canada West
- Died: November 30, 1899 (aged 56); Antonia Station, near Alexandria, Louisiana
- Military career
- Allegiance: Canada; Confederate States of America
- Service years: 1861–64 (CSA)
- Rank: Private
- Nickname: "Lightning"
- Unit: 2nd Kentucky Cavalry
- Conflicts: American Civil War: Morgan's Raid

George A. Ellsworth (July 24, 1843–November 30, 1899), commonly known as "Lightning" Ellsworth, was a Canadian telegrapher who served in the cavalry forces of Brig. Gen. John Hunt Morgan in the Confederate Army during the American Civil War. His use of the telegraph to spread disinformation to the Union forces was declared by The Times as the greatest innovation to come out of the war.

== Biography ==
Born in Canada West, Ellsworth was fascinated by the telegraph as soon as it was invented. As a teenager, he traveled to Washington, D.C., to study in Samuel Morse's telegraphy school. According to a death notice in the St. Louis Globe-Democrat, "In 1858 he served under Col. C. W. Hammond, the superintendent of telegraph for the Missouri Pacific-Iron Mountain system, who at that time was working for the Western Union Telegraph company at its first St. Louis office, on Chestnut street, between Second and Main streets. The Western Union company then employed but two operators in St. Louis; now its employees are numbered by the hundreds."

He then began working in Lexington, Kentucky, where he became friends with John Hunt Morgan. In 1860, Ellsworth moved to Houston, Texas.

=== American Civil War ===
When the war began in 1861, Morgan conceived of using the telegraph to spread disinformation in the United States. Realizing that Ellsworth was perfect for the job, he asked him to join. Ellsworth accepted and enlisted in Morgan's 2nd Kentucky Cavalry Regiment at Chattanooga, Tennessee.

Ellsworth excelled as a telegrapher. Not only could he read extremely fast code messages, but he also could imitate the sending style of other telegraphers (each of whom was slightly different), and he quickly mastered the "fist" of the U.S. Army's telegraphers in Kentucky and Tennessee. Ellsworth gained the nickname "Lightning" during Morgan's first Kentucky Raid, when he sat on a railroad cross tie in knee-deep water near Horse Cave, Kentucky, calmly tapping away at his telegraph key during a thunderstorm.

Ellsworth accompanied Morgan on his unauthorized Morgan's Raid into Indiana and Ohio in 1863. He fled by swimming across the Ohio River with his portable telegraph, hanging on to a mule, at the Battle of Buffington Island. After Morgan escaped from the Ohio Penitentiary, Ellsworth accompanied him on his last Kentucky raid in 1864. Morgan was killed, and Ellsworth was captured at Cynthiana, Kentucky, but he soon absconded to Canada. Confederate spy Thomas Hines met him there, and he enlisted Ellsworth's help in an unsuccessful attempt to free Confederate POWs in the United States.

=== Post-war ===
In 1867, Ellsworth was charged with shooting and killing a man named James Swathers or Smothers at Sharpsburg, Kentucky. He escaped the jail where he was first held and later recaptured in Missouri. A telegraph operator named George Ellsworth who was born in Canada and whose parents were born in Canada appears in the 1880 census as a resident of New Orleans. In 1883, George A. Ellsworth was supervisor of telegraph for a railroad of New Orleans and the Mississippi Valley. He was said to be a resident of Algiers, Louisiana, as of 1883, when he came to Birmingham, Alabama to do some telegraphy work.

In 1899, a Brooklyn newspaper reprinted a story from the St. Louis Globe-Democrat that mentioned Ellsworth: "He is still living in Alabama, just where Morgan originally picked him up and attended the Confederate reunion at Nashville last year, much to the surprise and joy of Morgan's survivors, for there was a tradition among the men that Ellsworth fell in the famous Ohio raid of 1863, or had died in captivity."

He died at age 65 at his desk at a station of the Iron Mountain Railway in Louisiana. According to his obituary, "for several years he was employed at Monroe, and resided in Algiers, for many years, being then in the employ of the Morgan railway company...He is said to have been one of the best operators that ever struck a key." According to Edison, Lightning Ellsworth died in the Texas Panhandle, after he had become a "bad gun man".

== Personal ==
Ellsworth was married at Algiers, Louisiana, to a woman named Mary Mullen, native of Virginia, who died in 1939. They may have had a daughter together, and a son who died at age three in 1884.

== Additional images ==
George Ellsworth, American Civil War
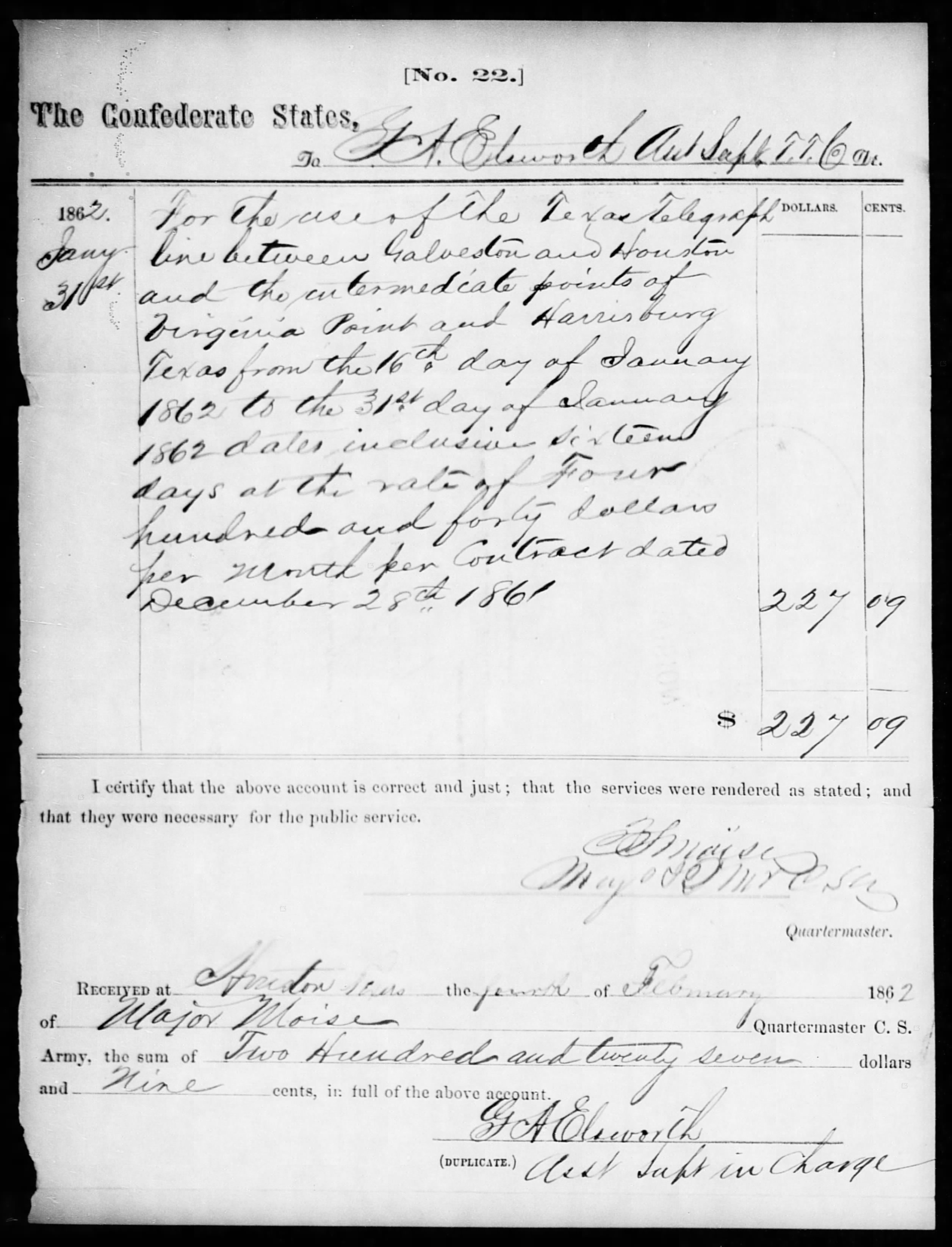
Funding for a Texas telegraph line

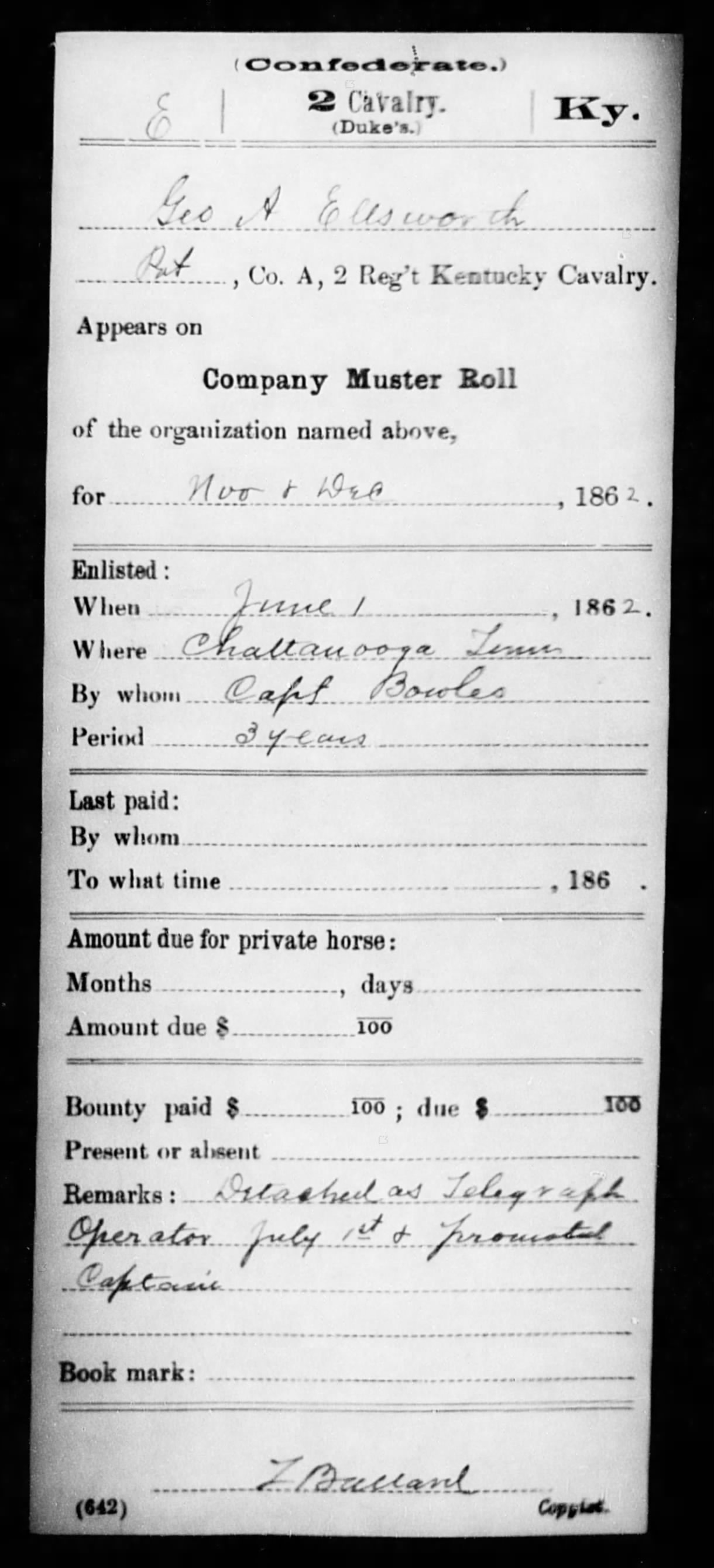
Part of Ellsworth's Confederate personnel record
