= 25th Kentucky Infantry Regiment =

- Active: January 1, 1862, to April 13, 1862
- Country: United States
- Allegiance: Union
- Branch: Infantry
- Engagements: Battle of Fort Donelson; Battle of Shiloh

The 25th Kentucky Infantry Regiment was an infantry regiment that served in the Union Army during the American Civil War.

== Service ==
The 25th Kentucky Infantry Regiment was organized at Camp Joe Anderson near Hopkinsville, Kentucky and mustered in for a three-year enlistment on January 1, 1862.

The regiment was attached to 13th Brigade, Army of the Ohio, to December 1861. 13th Brigade, 5th Division, Army of the Ohio, to February 1862. 1st Brigade, 3rd Division, Army of the Tennessee, to March 1862. 3rd Brigade, 4th Division, Army of the Tennessee, to April 1862.

The 25th Kentucky Infantry ceased to exist on April 13, 1862, when its members were consolidated with the 17th Kentucky Infantry.

== Detailed service ==
Duty at Calhoun, Kentucky, until February 1862. Moved to Fort Donelson, Tennessee, February 11–13. Investment and capture of Fort Donelson, February 13–16. Expedition to Crump's Landing, Tennessee, March 14–17. Battle of Shiloh, April 6–7.

== Casualties ==
The regiment lost so many men to disease, that it was consolidated with the 17th Kentucky Infantry.

== Commanders ==
- Colonel James Murrell Shackelford

== Notable members ==
- Lieutenant Colonel Benjamin Bristow - United States Secretary of the Treasury (1874–1876)

== See also ==
- List of Kentucky Civil War Units
- Kentucky in the Civil War
