= Morgan's Raid =

Military campaign in the American Civil War

- Part of the American Civil War
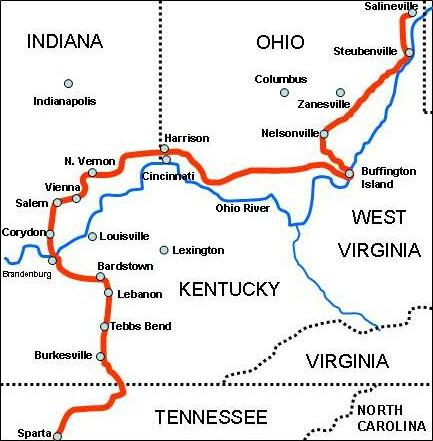
- Map of Morgan's route. Small groups of Morgan's scouts and raiding parties rode through some southern Indiana counties. The main body of Morgan's force followed a route through eight counties, passing through such towns as Corydon, Salem, Lexington, Vernon (rather than North Vernon), and Versailles on the way to Harrison, Ohio.
Date	June 11 – July 26, 1863
Location	Tennessee, Kentucky, Indiana, Ohio, West Virginia
Result	Union victory

Belligerents
United States	(Confederate States of America) Confederate States

Commanders and leaders
Ambrose Burnside; Henry M. Judah	John Hunt Morgan

Strength
40,000+	2,462

Casualties and losses
6,000 prisoners paroled	2,000 prisoners taken 60-100 men Killed

Morgan's Raid (also the Calico Raid or Great Raid of 1863) was a diversionary incursion by Confederate cavalry into the Union states of Indiana, Ohio, and West Virginia during the American Civil War. The raid took place from June 11 to July 26, 1863. It is named for the commander of the Confederate troops, Brigadier General John Hunt Morgan. Although it caused temporary alarm in the North, the raid failed.

The raid covered more than 1,000 miles (1,600 km), beginning in Tennessee and ending in northern Ohio. It coincided with the Vicksburg and Gettysburg campaigns. It was meant to draw U.S. troops away from those fronts by frightening the North into demanding its troops return home. Despite his initial successes, Morgan failed to recross the Ohio River and eventually surrendered what remained of his command in northeastern Ohio near the Pennsylvania border. Morgan and other senior officers were held in the Ohio Penitentiary, but they tunneled their way out and took a train to Cincinnati, where they crossed the Ohio River into Kentucky.

== Tennessee and Kentucky ==
General Morgan and his 2,460 handpicked Confederate cavalrymen, along with four artillery pieces, departed from Sparta, Tennessee, on June 11, 1863. The expedition intended to divert the attention of the Union Army of the Ohio from Confederate forces in the state and possibly stir up pro-Confederate sentiments in the North. General Braxton Bragg, the regional Confederate commander, intended Morgan's cavalrymen to distract U.S. forces by entering Kentucky. Morgan, however, confided to some of his officers that he had long desired to invade Indiana and Ohio to bring the terror of war to the Union. Bragg had given him carte blanche to ride throughout Tennessee and Kentucky, but ordered him to under no circumstances cross the Ohio River. On June 23, the Federal Army of the Cumberland began its operations against General Bragg's Confederate Army of Tennessee in what became known as the Tullahoma Campaign, and Morgan decided it was time to move northward into Kentucky.

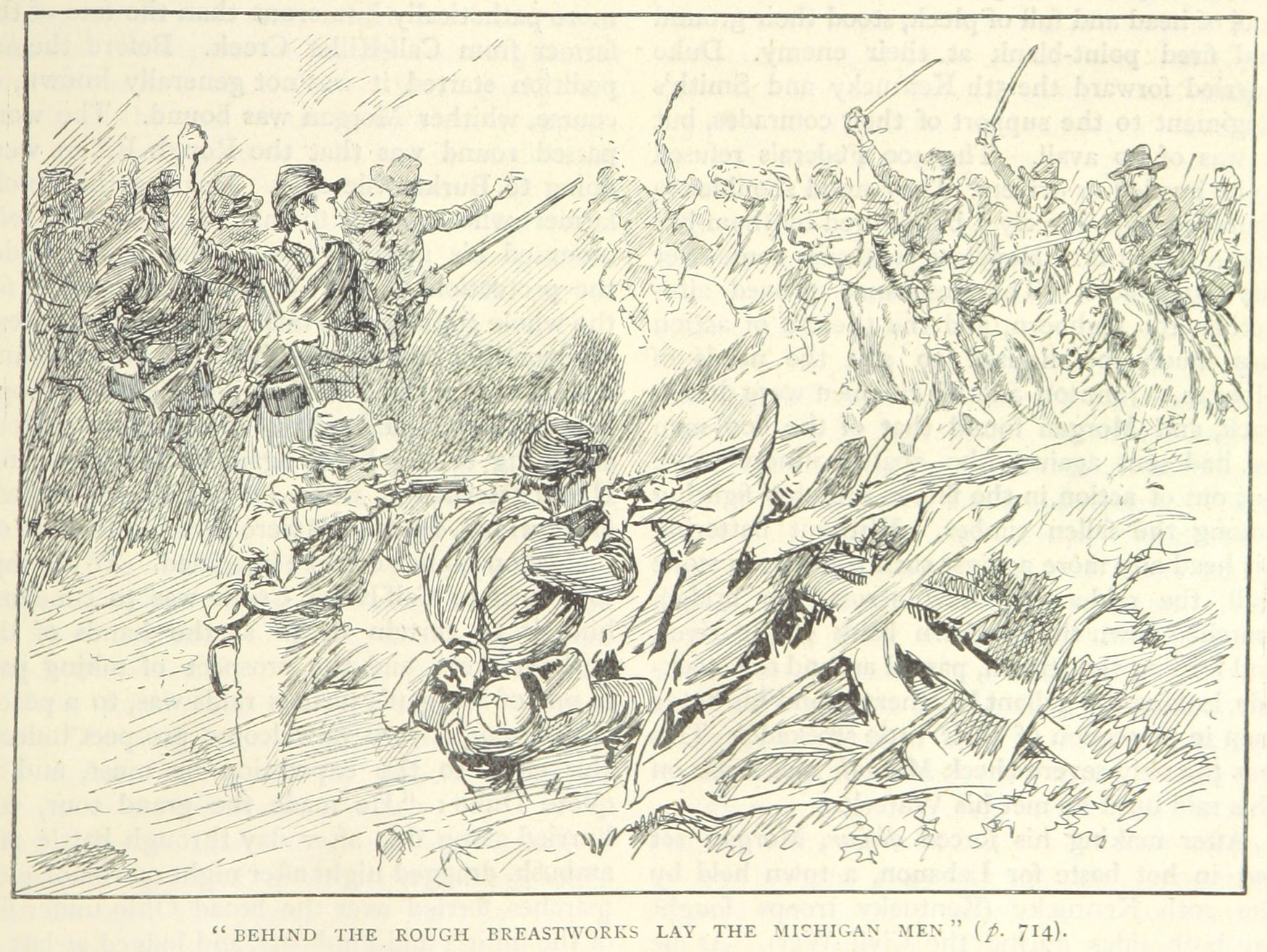
The Battle of Tebbs' Bend

On July 2, hoping to disrupt Union communication lines, Morgan rode into Kentucky, where sympathetic citizens openly welcomed his cavalrymen. Crossing the rain-swollen Cumberland River at Burkesville, Morgan's division advanced to the Green River, where it was deflected by half of a Union regiment (the 25th Michigan Infantry Regiment) at the Battle of Tebbs Bend on July 4. Morgan surprised and captured the garrison at Lebanon. He trapped 400 men from the 20th Kentucky in the town's railroad depot, but the well-fortified building provided considerable protection. In a six-hour fight, Federal troops killed Morgan's youngest brother, Thomas, during the Confederate's final charge. Morgan finally captured and then paroled the U.S. troops.

A grieving Morgan continued northward to Louisville, riding through Springfield, Bardstown, and Garnettsville. Along the way, the Confederates endured several smaller skirmishes with Union troops and Kentucky home guard units. However, he turned his remaining men to the northwest and headed for the Ohio River just south of the city.

At Springfield, Morgan sent a detachment north and east of Louisville, intending to confuse Union forces about where Morgan was heading. Before rejoining Morgan, this detachment crossed the Ohio River at Twelve Mile Island and was captured near New Pekin, Indiana. To further mislead the U.S. soldiers of his objectives, Morgan had his telegrapher, "Lightning" Ellsworth, tap telegraph lines and, pretending to be a Union telegrapher, send several messages giving different headings for the raiders and false reports of the size of Morgan's force—sometimes reporting it as high as 7,000 men. Ellsworth did this throughout the journey, especially in Indiana.

== Indiana ==
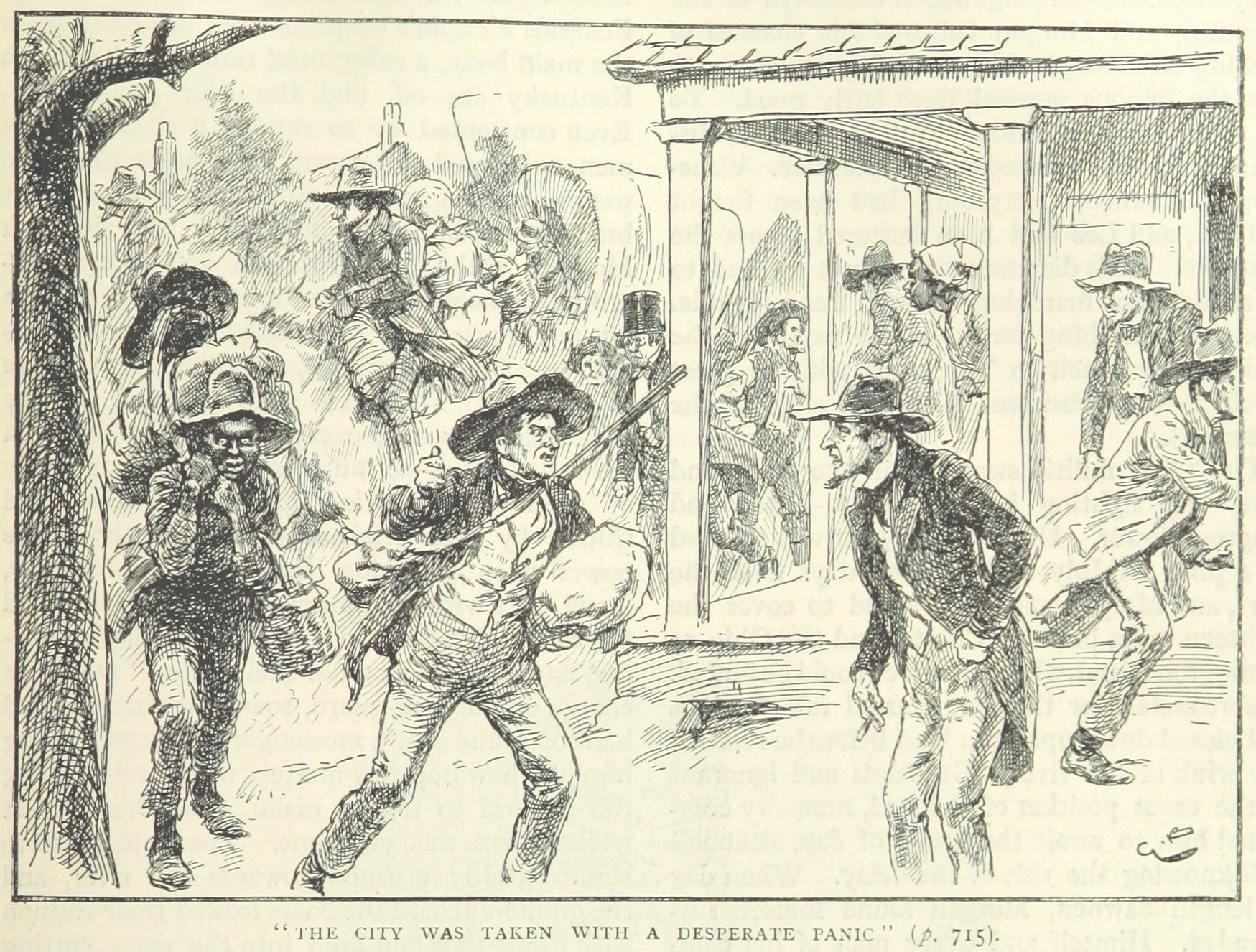
Panic in Louisville as Morgan's troops approach; Drawing from Illustrated Battles of the Nineteenth Century, vol. 2

Morgan had sent spy Thomas Hines and a party of 62 Confederates, posing as a Union patrol, on a secret mission into Indiana in June to determine if the local Copperheads would support or join Morgan's impending raid. After visiting the local Copperhead leader, Dr. William A. Bowles, Hines learned that no desired support would be forthcoming. He and his scouts were soon identified as actually being Confederates, and, in a minor skirmish near Leavenworth, Indiana, Hines had to abandon his men as he swam across the Ohio River under gunfire. He wandered around Kentucky for a week seeking information on Morgan's whereabouts.

By now reduced to 1,800 men, Morgan's main column had arrived on the morning of July 8 at Brandenburg, Kentucky, a small town along the Ohio River, where Hines rejoined them. Here, the raiders seized two steamboats, the John B. McCombs and the Alice Dean. Morgan, against Bragg's strict orders, transported his command across the river to Indiana, landing just east of Mauckport. A small company of Indiana home guards contested the crossing with an artillery piece, as did a riverboat carrying a six-pounder. However, the gunboat soon withdrew, and Morgan's forces safely crossed the river into Indiana that night. After burning the Alice Dean and sending the John B. McCombs downriver with instructions not to pursue him, Morgan headed away from the river.

Governor Oliver P. Morton worked feverishly to organize Indiana's defense, calling for men to take up arms and form militia companies. Thousands responded and organized themselves into companies and regiments. Col. Lewis Jordan took command of the 450 members of the Harrison County Home Guard (Sixth Regiment, Indiana Legion), consisting of poorly trained civilians with a motley collection of arms. His goal was to delay Morgan long enough for Union reinforcements to arrive.

Maj. Gen. Ambrose Burnside, commander of the Department of the Ohio with headquarters in Cincinnati, quickly organized local Federal troops and home militia to cut off Morgan's routes back to the Confederacy. Morgan headed northward on Mauckport Road with another brother, Colonel Richard Morgan, leading the forward elements. On July 9, one mile (1.6 km) south of Corydon, Indiana, the county seat of Harrison County, his advance guard encountered Jordan's small force, drawn in a battle line behind a hastily thrown up barricade of logs. The colonel attacked, and in a short but spirited battle of less than an hour, he simultaneously outflanked both Union wings, completely routing the hapless militia. Accounts vary as to the number of casualties that resulted from the Battle of Corydon, but one source estimates that 4 of Jordan's men were killed, 10–12 were wounded, and 355 were captured. Morgan counted 11 dead and 40 wounded raiders. Among the dead Federals was the civilian toll keeper who perished near his tollgate. Raiders killed a Lutheran minister, Reverend Peter Glenn, on his farm, 4 miles (6 km) from the battlefield, and stole horses from several other farmers.

General Morgan led his division into Corydon, where he paroled his demoralized prisoners and ransomed the town for cash and supplies. Morgan's soldiers then traveled east and reached Vienna on July 10, where they burned a railroad bridge and depot and tapped a telegraph line. After spending the night in Lexington, they headed to the northeast, terrorizing the small towns along the way, including Vernon, Dupont, New Pekin, Salem, and Versailles, with his troops facing a little bit of resistance from Indiana Home Guard troops and the 1st Michigan Sharpshooters Regiment at Vernon.

On July 11, while crossing Blue River near New Pekin, Confederate Capt. William J. Davis and some of his men were captured by the 73rd Indiana Infantry and a detachment of the 5th U.S. Regulars. Davis and several other soldiers were taken to New Albany and secured in the county jail. This is known locally as the Battle of Oak Ridge.

On the night of July 11, Morgan camped near the town of Dupont, Indiana. Subsequently, on July 12, his men burned the town's storehouse. They stole 2,000 hams before continuing east. By the next day, such a large amount of meat in the open air had attracted flies, and the soldiers began discarding hams along the side of the road, leaving a trail for Indiana militia troops to follow as they chased Morgan and his men out of the state.

Morgan then headed for Salem, immediately occupying the town and placing guards over the stores and streets. His cavalrymen burned the large brick depot, along with all the railcars on the track and the railroad bridges on each side of town. They demanded ransoms from area flour and grist mills. After looting stores and taking about $500, they departed in the afternoon.

In Versailles, a group of freebooters invaded the local Masonic Lodge, Versailles No. 7, and stole the Lodge's office badges made from French silver coins. Morgan, himself a Freemason, ordered the officers' jewels returned, punishing the thievery of his men.

Morgan finally left Indiana at Harrison, closely pursued by U.S. cavalry.

== Ohio & West Virginia ==
The Confederates entered Ohio on July 13, destroying bridges, railroads, and government stores. Morgan's raid spread alarm across southern and central Ohio and caused speculation about his destination. Harper's Weekly, a leading Northern newspaper, reported:

The raid of the rebel Morgan into Indiana, which he seems to be pursuing with great boldness, has thoroughly aroused the people of that State and of Ohio to a sense of their danger. On 13th General Burnside declared martial law in Cincinnati, and in Covington and Newport on the Kentucky side. All business is suspended until further orders, and all citizens are required to organize in accordance with the direction of the State and municipal authorities. There is nothing definite as to Morgan's whereabouts; but it is supposed that he will endeavor to move around the city of Cincinnati and cross the river between there and Maysville. The militia is concentrating, in obedience to the order of Governor Tod.

— July 25, 1863, Harper's Weekly

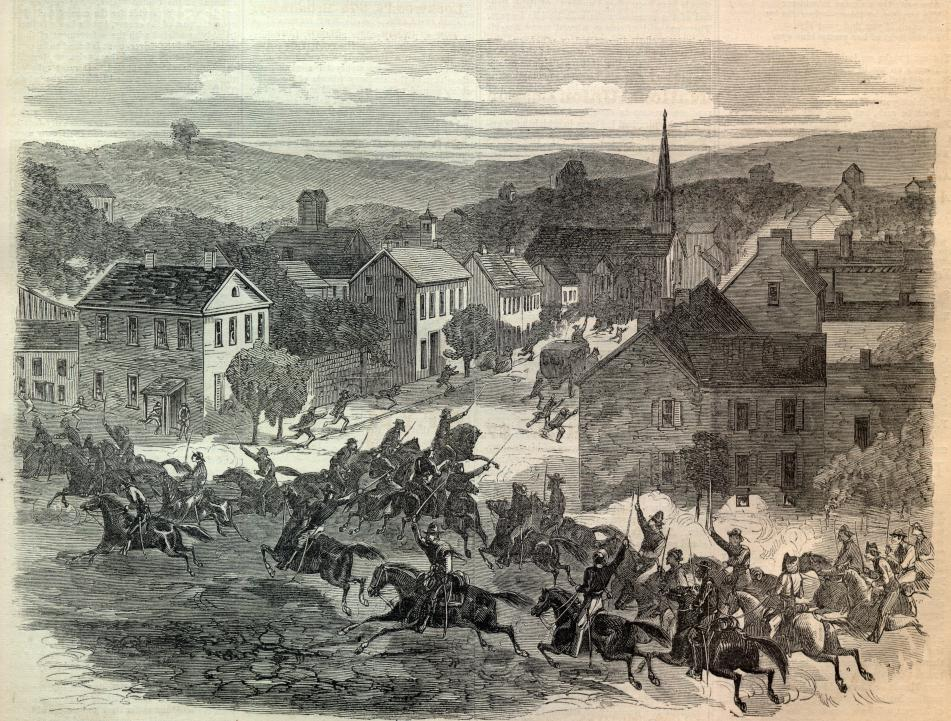
Morgan's Raiders enter Old Washington, Ohio

Sidestepping Burnside's forces that protected Cincinnati to the south he traveled through such northern communities as Harrison, New Baltimore, Colerain, Springdale, Glendale and Sharonville. Morgan and his men ran into significant resistance when trying to capture Camp Dennison. Morgan would eventually retreat and regroup with the other column of his men in Montgomery and bypass Camp Dennison through Wards Corner. Morgan continued east to the Ohio River where, just north of modern Ravenswood, West Virginia, there was a ford at Buffington Island that would allow him to cross over into that state. Burnside correctly guessed Morgan's intentions. Federal columns under Edward H. Hobson and Henry M. Judah and river gunboats swiftly converged to contest any river crossing. Burnside also sent a militia regiment from Marietta, Ohio, to hold the ford until the Federal forces could arrive. Morgan arrived on the evening of July 18 but decided not to attack the militia in the gathering darkness. It proved to be a mistake.

By morning, the cavalry and gunboats had arrived, blocking Morgan's escape route. At the subsequent Battle of Buffington Island in Ohio, Union troops won a decisive victory and captured 1,025 of Morgan's men in total, including his brother Richard and noted cavalryman Col. Basil W. Duke. Cut off from safety by the Union gunboats, Morgan and his remaining cavaliers headed northeast back into Ohio. A second attempt at crossing 20 miles (32 km) upriver (opposite Belleville, West Virginia) also failed, with several of Morgan's men drowning in the swirling river as the gunboats and Union cavalry again drove off the raiders. Col. Adam "Stovepipe" Johnson and over 300 raiders escaped into West Virginia and safety, but General Morgan remained on the Ohio side with the rest of his dwindling force. He was turned away at skirmishes in Gallia County at Coal Hill and Hockingport, losing more of his force.

As Morgan, with 400 remaining men, headed away from the river into the interior of southern Ohio, he paused at Nelsonville, a small town on the Hocking Canal. His men burned ten wooden canal boats and set a covered bridge ablaze to slow their pursuers. However, as soon as Morgan's raiders rode off, citizens rushed to save the burning span. Two hours later, Union cavalry arrived, delighted to find that the townspeople had prepared a feast for them.

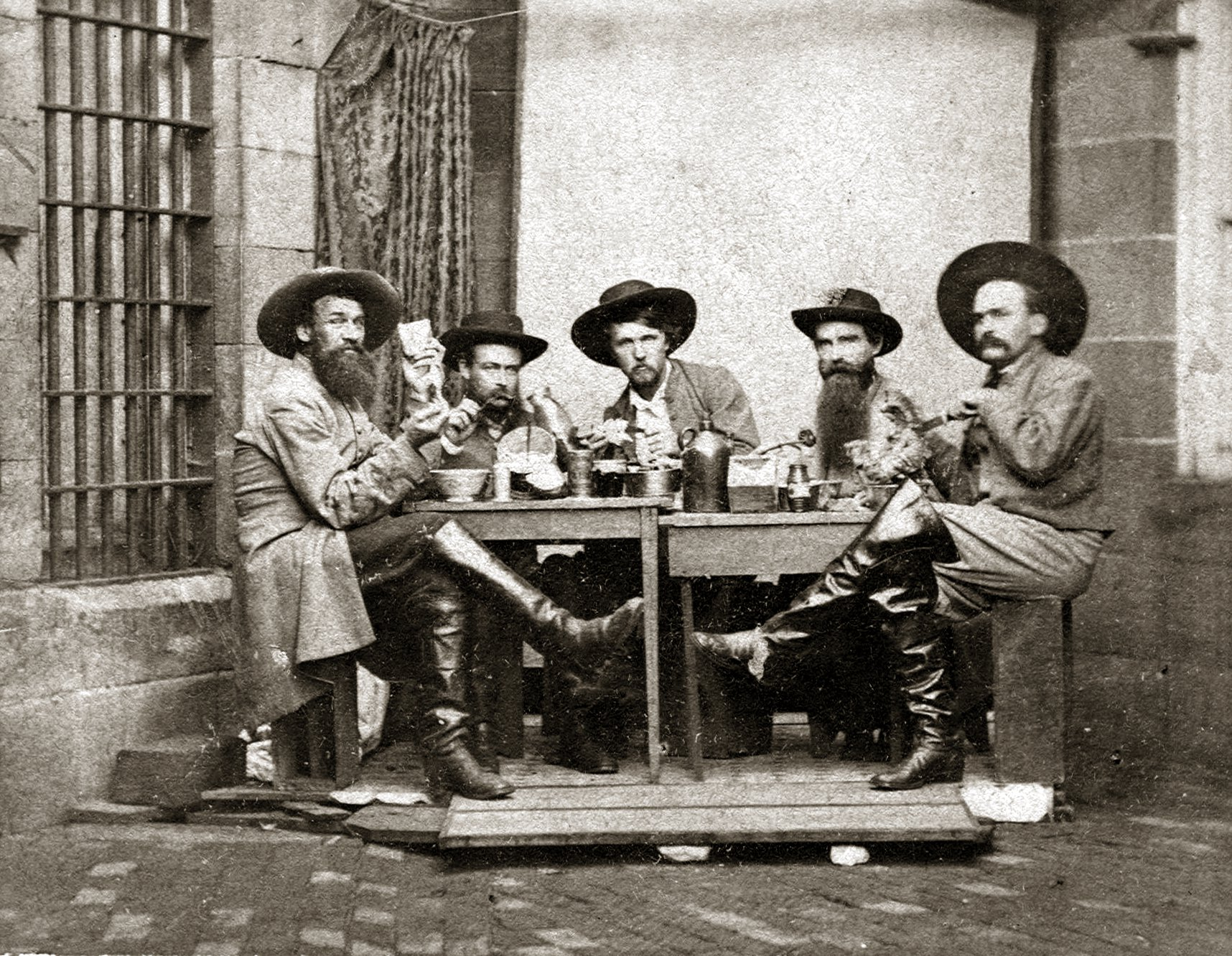
Group of "Morgan's Men" while prisoners of war in Western Penitentiary, Pennsylvania (Note: In prisoner photo: (l to r) Captain William E. Curry, 8th Kentucky Cavalry; Lieutenant Andrew J. Church, 8th Kentucky Cavalry; Lieutenant Leeland Hathaway, 14th Kentucky Cavalry; Lieutenant Henry D. Brown, 10th Kentucky Cavalry; Lieutenant William Hays, 20th Kentucky Cavalry.) All were captured with John Hunt Morgan in Ohio, 1863

With his men somewhat rested on Peter Weaver's homestead near Triadelphia on July 22 and guided down Island Run by the son, John Weaver, who was held hostage, Morgan forded the broad Muskingum River at Eagleport, just south of Zanesville, before turning northward in Guernsey County. He still hoped to cross the Ohio River at some point and head through West Virginia to safety. At the village of Old Washington, Morgan's weary men fought a skirmish in the streets before hastily departing, pursued by Union cavalry under Brig. Gen. James M. Shackelford. On July 26, Union forces defeated Morgan at the Battle of Salineville and finally caught him that afternoon near West Point in Columbiana County. They were held in Wellsville, Ohio, then taken to the Ohio Penitentiary in Columbus rather than to a prisoner-of-war camp, because of reports that captured Union officers had received similar treatment. Many of his enlisted men ended up in the Camp Douglas stockade in Chicago.

The general and six officers made a daring escape on November 27 by tunneling from an air shaft beneath their cells into the prison yard and scaling the walls. Only two of Morgan's men were recaptured, and he and the rest soon returned to the Confederacy. Morgan was killed less than a year later in Greeneville, Tennessee, by a Union cavalryman after refusing to halt while attempting to escape.

== Impact ==
During his raid, Morgan and his men captured and paroled about 6,000 U.S. soldiers and militia, destroyed 34 bridges, disrupted the railroads at more than 60 places, and diverted tens of thousands of troops from other duties. He spread terror throughout the region and seized thousands of dollars' worth of supplies, food, and other items from local stores, houses, and farms. Since the timing somewhat coincided with the Gettysburg campaign and raids towards Pittsburgh by John D. Imboden's cavalry, many assumed at the time that Morgan's Raid was part of a coordinated effort to threaten the Ohio River commerce and spread the war to the North. Few in the North realized that Morgan's adventure was a violation of his orders and had nothing to do with Robert E. Lee's simultaneous movement into Pennsylvania.

In Ohio alone, approximately 2,500 horses were stolen, and nearly 4,375 homes and businesses were raided. Morgan's Raid cost Ohio taxpayers nearly $600,000 in damages and over $200,000 in wages paid to the 49,357 Ohioans called up to man 587 companies of local militia.

Despite their military defeat and high casualties, the long raid had accomplished much for Morgan's men. Col. Basil Duke, Morgan's brother-in-law and second-in-command of the raid, later wrote, "The objects of the raid were accomplished. General Bragg's retreat was unmolested by any flanking forces of the enemy, and I think that military men, who will review all the facts, will pronounce that this expedition delayed for weeks the fall of East Tennessee, and prevented the timely reinforcement of Rosecrans by troops that would otherwise have participated in the Battle of Chickamauga."

To many Confederates, the incursion became known as the "Great Raid of 1863" and was initially hailed in the newspapers. However, along with Gettysburg and Vicksburg, it was another in a string of defeats for the Confederate Army that summer. Several Northern newspapers derisively labeled Morgan's expedition as the "Calico Raid," in reference to the raiders' propensity for procuring personal goods from local stores and houses.

== Memorialization ==
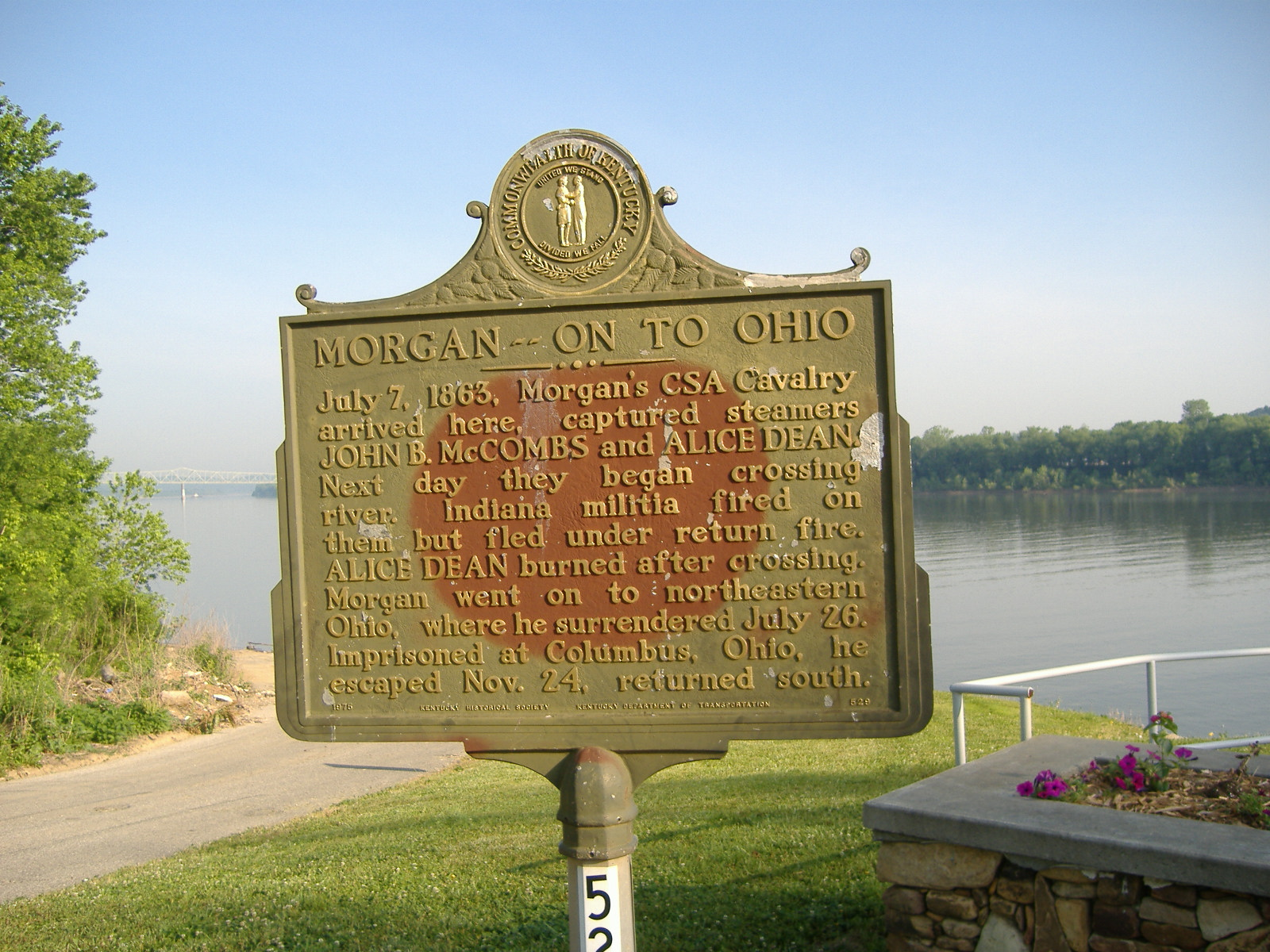
Historical marker noting Morgan's activities at Brandenburg, Kentucky, where his forces captured two steamboats, the John B. McCombs and the Alice Dean, before crossing the Ohio River into Indiana

Kentucky and Indiana have well-marked John Hunt Morgan Heritage Trails that allow tourists to follow the route of Morgan's Raid through their states, along with websites and written tour guides. In November 2001, the State of Ohio placed a John Hunt Morgan historical marker on the site of the Ohio State Penitentiary, remembering his imprisonment and daring escape. An equestrian statue of General Morgan was erected and dedicated in 1911 in downtown Lexington, Kentucky. Ohio's plans for a similar formal trail finally came to fruition in 2013, when the state erected over 600 directional markers and 56 interpretive signs commemorating the route and the important incidents of the raid. Signage was installed during the spring and summer of 2013, in the months leading up to the 150th anniversary of the "Great Raid."

The State of Michigan has a Michigan Historic site and marker at the location of the Battle of Tebbs End in honor of the 25th Michigan.

On the weekend of July 27–28, 2013, communities in Carroll, Jefferson, and Columbiana County, Ohio, held a driving tour to commemorate the 150th anniversary of the raid, with a Civil War era church service, the dedication of a Morgan's Raid Heritage Trail tablet to mark the location of the fighting at Sharp's farm, and events in towns on and near the raid route.

The oil painting "Morgan's Raiders" is hung at the Federal Building and U.S. Courthouse in Gainesville, Georgia. The painting was made in 1936 by artist Daniel Boza, commissioned by the Works Progress Administration (President Franklin Roosevelt administration).

== Bibliography ==
- "An Incident of Morgan's Raid: Valueless Bill Left to Pay for Fine Horse and Wheat Crop," The Zanesville Signal, Vol. 28, no. 219 (Tuesday, 4 December 1906), p. 2, col. 4.
- Duke, Basil Wilson, A History of Morgan's Cavalry. Cincinnati, Ohio: Miami Printing and Pub. Co., 1867. On-line version
- Harper, Robert S., Ohio Handbook of the Civil War. Columbus: The Ohio Historical Society, 1961.
- Horwitz, Lester V., The Longest Raid of the Civil War. Cincinnati, Ohio: Farmcourt Publishing, Inc., 1999. ISBN 0-9670267-3-3.
- Kelsey, D.M., Deeds of Daring by the American Soldier North and South During the Civil War. New York, Akron, and Chicago: The Saalfield Publishing Company, 1903.
- Mingus, Scott L., "Morgan's Raid," CHARGE! Magazine, Vol. 4, August, 2004, pp. 12–13. Text used by permission of the Johnny Reb Gaming Society.
- Mosgrove, George Dallas, "Following Morgan's Plume in Indiana and Ohio," Southern Historical Society Papers, Vol. XXXV. January–December, 1907.
- Ramage, James A., Rebel Raider: The Life of General John Hunt Morgan. Lexington: University Press of Kentucky, 1986. ISBN 0-8131-1576-0.
- Richardson, John V. Die Weber Familie: The Weber, Wollenschlager, Habermann, and Kempf Families. Los Angeles, ITA Press, 2020. ISBN 0-9819196-3-4.
- Simmons, Flora E., A complete account of the John Morgan raid through Indiana and Ohio, in July, 1863. Self-published, 1863.
- Thomas, Edison H., John Hunt Morgan and His Raiders. Lexington: University Press of Kentucky, 1975. ISBN 0-8131-0214-6.
- U.S. War Department, The War of the Rebellion: A Compilation of the Official Records of the Union and Confederate Armies, 70 volumes in 4 series. Washington, D.C.: United States Government Printing Office, 1880–1901. Online version
