= West Point, Columbiana County, Ohio =

West Point, Ohio
- Unincorporated community
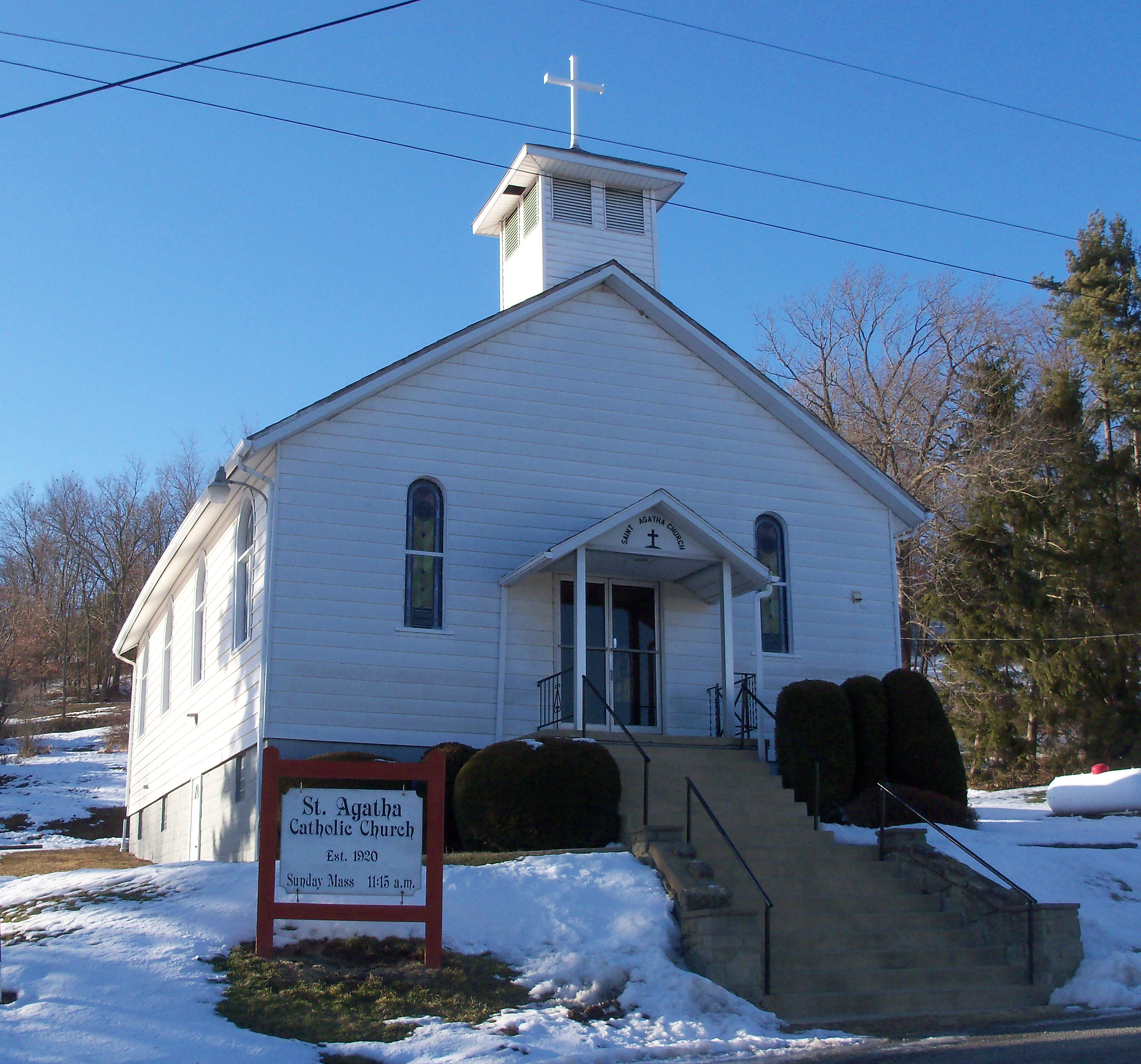
- St. Agatha Church

- Location within Ohio Location within the United States
- Coordinates: 40°42′30″N 80°42′08″W
- Country: United States
- State: Ohio
- County: Columbiana
- Township: Madison
- Elevation: 938 ft (286 m)
- Time zone: UTC-5 (Eastern (EST))
  - Summer (DST): UTC-4 (EDT)
- ZIP code: 44492
- Area codes: 234/330
- GNIS feature ID: 1061749

West Point is an unincorporated community in Madison Township, Columbiana County, Ohio, United States. A former coal town, it lies along U.S. Route 30 at its intersection with Ohio State Route 45 and 518.

== History ==
West Point was not officially platted. It grew as a community along the Youngstown and Ohio River Railroad, and was home to the railroad's coal power plant in the early 20th century. A post office called West Point had been in operation from 1836 to 1903, and again from 1955 until 2018.

On July 26, 1863, Union forces defeated Confederate General John Hunt Morgan at the Battle of Salineville following his 1,000 mile raid along the Ohio River. Union General James M. Shackelford and his 3,000 men army, in addition to the Steubenville and New Lisbon militias, captured Morgan and his remaining men in a short firefight west of West Point. The John H. Morgan Surrender Site commemorates the location of the surrender.

== Education ==
Children in West Point are served by the public Beaver Local School District, which includes one elementary school, one middle school, and Beaver Local High School. A West Point Public School was first founded around 1940 and a second building was built in 1953, which was demolished in 2015.

== Notable people ==
- Robert Allen, Brigadier general in the Union Army during the American Civil War
