= John H. Morgan Surrender Site =

- U.S. National Register of Historic Places
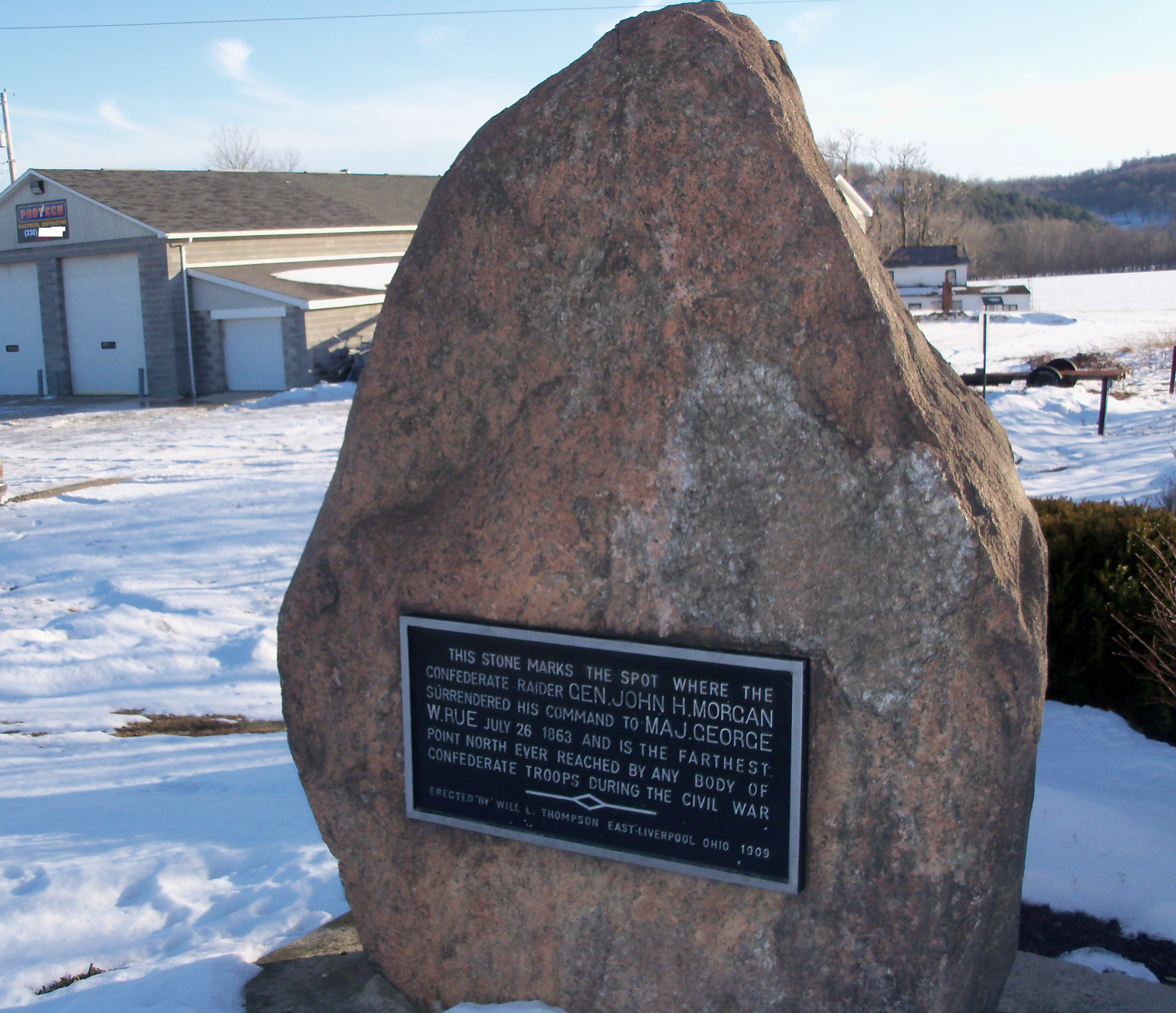
- Monument at the site of Morgan's Surrender

- Location within Ohio Location within the United States
- Nearest city: West Point, Ohio
- Coordinates: 40°41′53″N 80°44′50″W
- Area: 0.1 acres (0.040 ha)
- Built: 1863
- NRHP reference No.: 73001401
- Added to NRHP: April 23, 1973

The John H. Morgan Surrender Site is the place where, during the American Civil War, Brig. Gen. John Hunt Morgan, the leader of Confederate troops responsible for Morgan's Raid, surrendered to Union troops following the Battle of Salineville. The site is located at a crossroads between the villages of Gavers and West Point in Columbiana County, Ohio, about 60 miles northwest of Pittsburgh, Pennsylvania. The site was listed on the National Register of Historic Places on April 23, 1973, for its military significance.

Morgan reportedly surrendered under what was called the "Surrender Tree". The location was at the northernmost point where a Confederate unit pierced U.S.-controlled territory during the war, except for the St. Albans Raid in Vermont.

== Morgan's Raid ==
In June 1863, Brigadier General John Hunt Morgan took command of a force of 2,500 Confederate men in Kentucky. The purpose of the detachment was to recruit volunteers from the border state and distract U.S. General Ambrose Burnside, who was planning an offensive into Tennessee. Morgan's superior, General Braxton Bragg, specifically ordered Morgan not to cross the Ohio River into Union-controlled territory.

Morgan disobeyed his orders, and from June 11 to July 26, 1863, his troops conducted the raid in an area that ranged from Tennessee to northern Ohio. Morgan ransacked the countryside and disrupted telegraph and railroad lines as he moved north. He was pursued by a division of U.S. cavalry commanded by Brig. General Edward H. Hobson, who, together with reinforcements dispatched by Maj. General Ambrose Burnside, caught up to Morgan's force at Buffington Island, which fled northward.

In Columbiana County, fears increased as Morgan's Raid approached. There were exaggerated reports that his force numbered as many as 10,000 men. The day before the surrender, residents of Lisbon, Ohio, mobilized when they heard that Morgan was in Salineville in Columbiana County.

The final armed engagement of the raid occurred around 8 a.m. July 26 near the border of Carroll, Columbiana, and Jefferson counties.

As Morgan's troops approached, the New Lisbon militia dragged an old cannon from the Mexican War to block the road to town from the south.

At around 11 a.m., word reached town that the rebels had routed the militia and were coming into the town. Though the report was false, the militia members at the cannon allowed Morgan's army to pass unchallenged because they were afraid to engage them.

== Morgan's Surrender ==
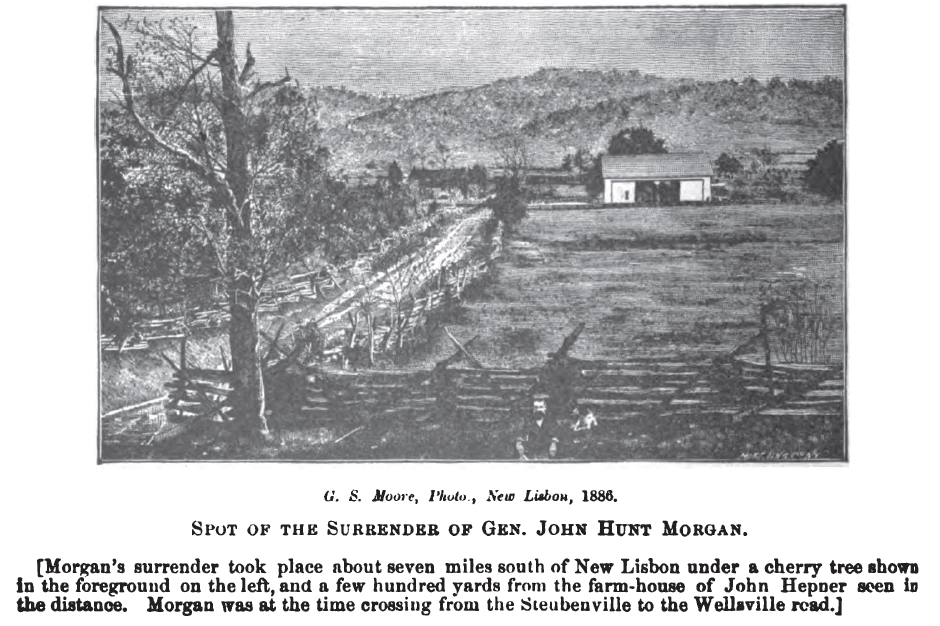
Site of Morgan's surrender, sketched by Henry Howe from an 1886 photograph

Morgan encountered Capt. James Burbeck, one of Lisbon's militia commanders, along the road. Morgan convinced Burbeck to allow him to surrender his command, provided Burbick promised to take the sick and wounded soldiers and allow Morgan and his officers to be paroled so they could return home to Kentucky. However, Major George W. Rue's troops had gathered at Morgan's front and rear. Morgan sent a flag of truce with one of his officers to inform Rue that Morgan had already surrendered to Burbeck under favorable terms.

Rue replied that he did not know who Captain Burbeck was and demanded that Morgan surrender to him immediately.

An hour later, Brig. Gen. James M. Shackelford arrived and discussed surrender terms with Morgan. When informed of Burbick's parole of Morgan and his officers, Shackelford said it was "not only absurd and ridiculous, but unfair and illegal."

Until the end of his life, Shackelford took credit for capturing Morgan since Rue was under his command. Rue also continued to take credit privately.

In July and August 1863, Ohio Governor David Tod led an inquiry into Morgan's surrender. Governor Tod concluded that Captain Burbridge was actually James Burbick, a private citizen of New Lisbon, Ohio, who had never served as an officer in the Ohio Militia. As such, Governor Tod ruled that he had no authority over Morgan and that Morgan's surrender to U.S. Army forces stood.

Morgan and more than 60 of his officers were imprisoned in the Ohio Penitentiary in Columbus. On the night of November 27, 1863, Morgan and six others escaped from the prison, with a plan originated by Thomas Hines.
