= Battle of Salineville =

Battle of the American Civil War

- Part of American Civil War
- 1860 map of Columbiana County, Ohio; Salineville is located in Washington Township, lower left (LOC 2012586253)
| Date | July 26, 1863 |
| Location | Columbiana County, Ohio |
| Result | Union victory; End of Morgan's raid |

Belligerents
| United States (Union) | (Confederate States of America) Confederate States (Confederacy) |

Commanders and leaders
| James M. Shackelford | John Hunt Morgan (surrendered) |

Units involved
| Mixed elements of West Virginia, Kentucky, Illinois, Tennessee, Michigan and Ohio cavalry, artillery and mounted infantry | Unknown |

Strength
| 2,600 | 800 |

Casualties and losses
| None | 364 (23 killed, remainder wounded and/or captured) |

The Battle of Salineville occurred July 26, 1863, near Salineville, Ohio, during the American Civil War. U.S. Brig. Gen. James M. Shackelford destroyed Confederate Brig. Gen. John Hunt Morgan's remaining Confederate cavalry and captured Morgan, ending Morgan's Raid. It was the northernmost military action involving an official command of the Confederate States Army.

== Background ==
In June 1863, Confederate Brig. Gen. John Hunt Morgan departed camp in Tennessee on a raid with 2,460 troopers, intending to divert the attention of the Union Army of the Ohio from Confederate forces occupying the state. On July 8, 1863, Morgan crossed the Ohio River at Brandenburg, Kentucky, and entered Indiana, in violation of his orders to remain in Kentucky. After a victory at the Battle of Corydon, Morgan proceeded eastward into Ohio, pursued by U.S. troops under Brig. Gen. James M. Shackelford. On July 19, Morgan attempted to cross the Ohio River into West Virginia at Buffington Island, upriver from Pomeroy in Meigs County, Ohio. Some Confederates successfully fled across the river and to Confederate-held territory. However, Union forces under Brig. Gens. Edward H. Hobson and Henry M. Judah captured an estimated 800 – 1,200 of Morgan's force, while some 300 under Col. Adam "Stovepipe" Johnson crossed upriver.

Morgan and the remaining 400 men escaped, cut off from the river crossings. When another attempt to ford the river failed, Morgan headed north, eventually reaching Columbiana County, still hoping to cross the Ohio River at some point and retreat to the Confederacy. His route took him through several terrified villages, including Moorefield, Harrisville, New Athens, Smithfield, New Alexandria, Wintersville, Two Ridge, Richmond, East Springfield, Bergholz, and Monroeville (Jefferson County). Morgan fled northward with depleted horses and men while U.S. soldiers blocked attempts to reach the river.

== The battle and Morgan's surrender ==
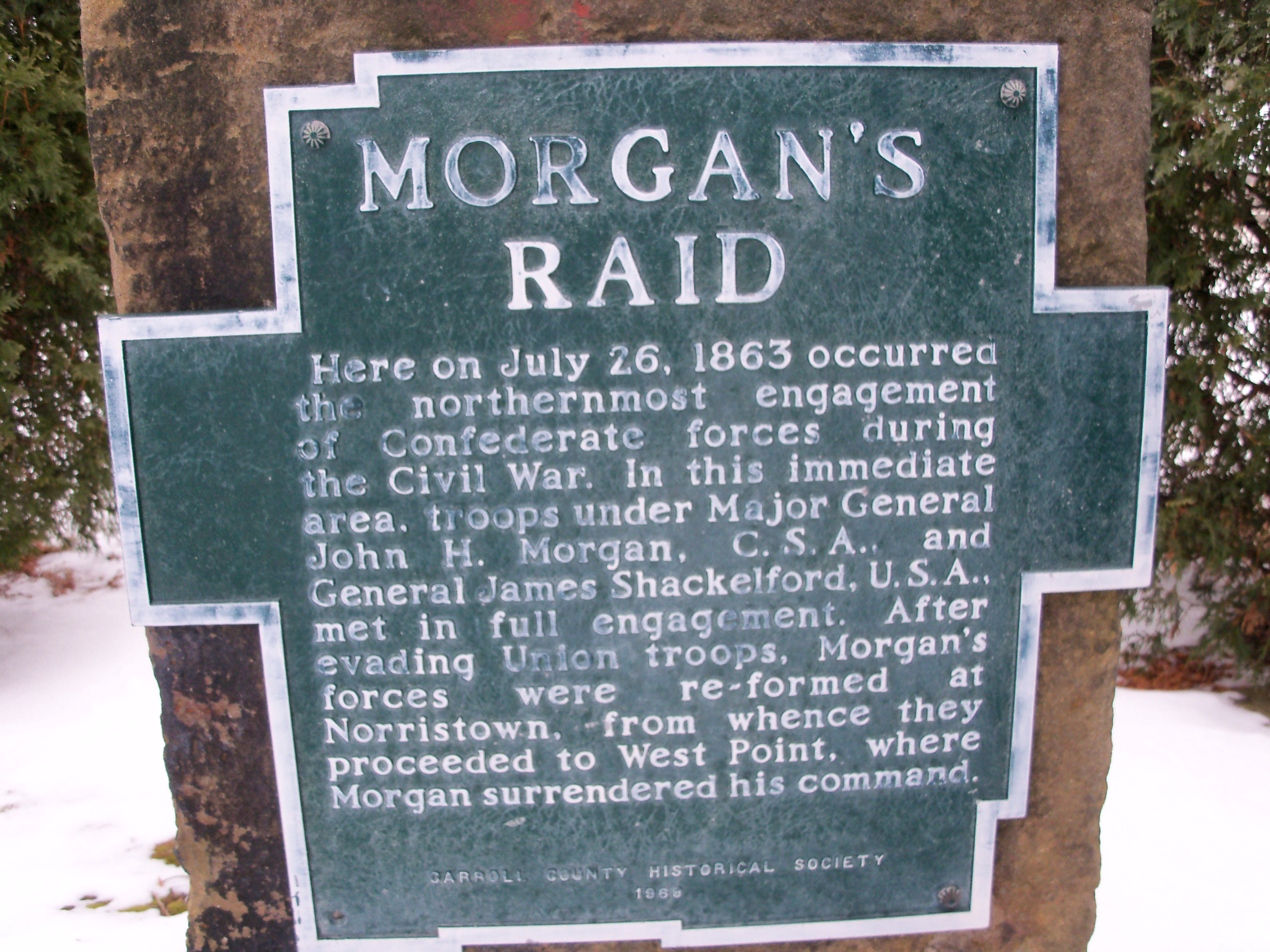
Plaque at site of battle

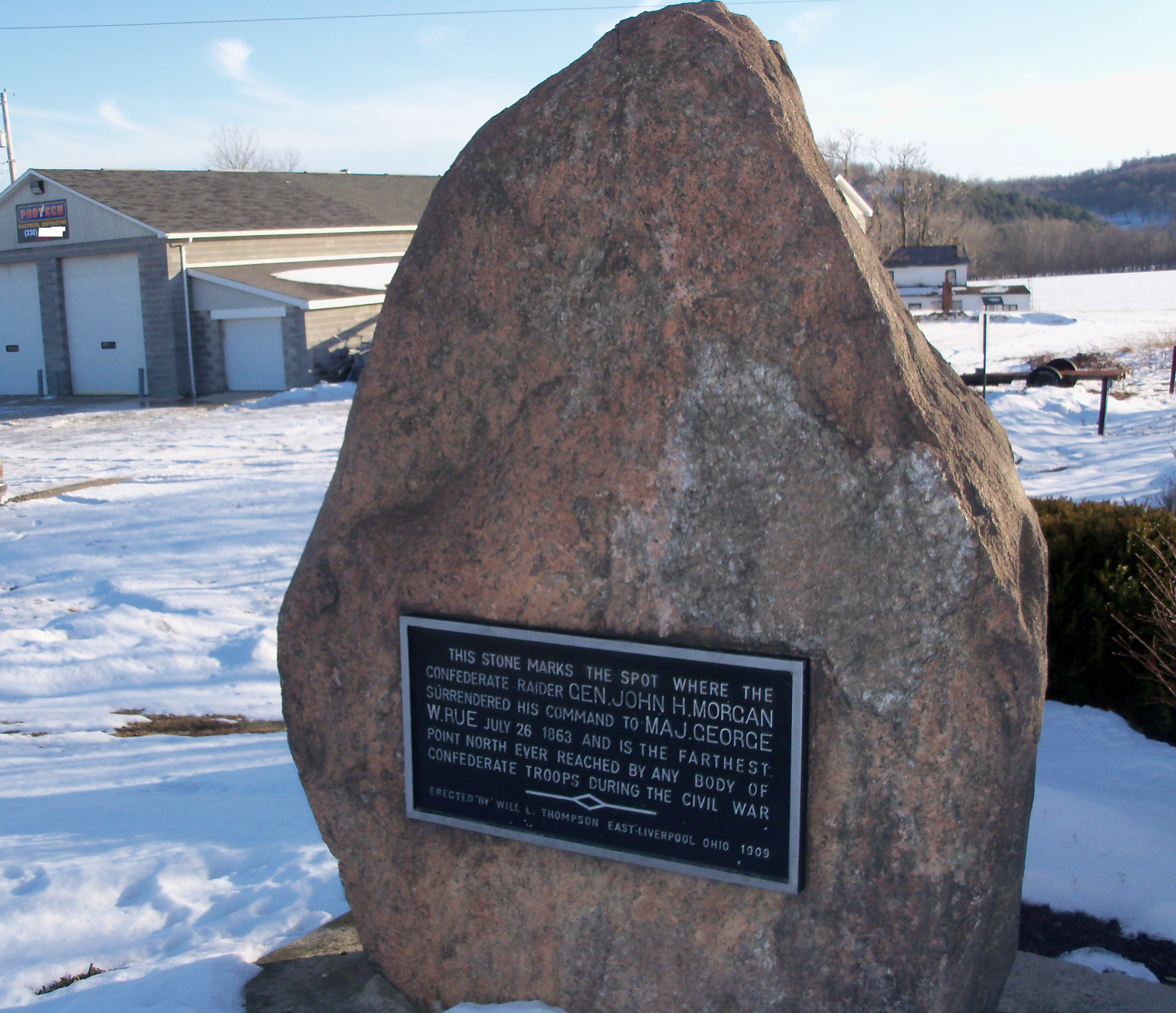
Plaque at site of Morgan's surrender

U.S. General Shackelford continued in pursuit of Morgan, leading a mixed command of cavalry, artillery, and mounted infantry from Illinois, Kentucky, West Virginia, Tennessee, Michigan and Ohio, as well as the Steubenville Militia. Morgan's weary men were isolated, constantly pursued, and heading deeper into U.S.-controlled territory. Eventually, Morgan was flanked and cut off by U.S. forces on July 26, 1863, at Salineville, near Lisbon, Ohio. Badly outnumbered, Morgan attempted to cut his way out from the estimated 3,000 U.S. soldiers. He lost 364 men (including 23 dead, several wounded, and nearly 300 captured) in a firefight that lasted no more than an hour and a half. Morgan and some of his men initially managed to elude capture. However, at 2:00 p.m., they surrendered to U.S. Maj. George W. Rue of the 9th Kentucky Cavalry near West Point, Ohio approximately 8 miles northeast of Salineville. Today, a historical marker commemorates the location of the surrender (40° 41.833′ N, 80° 44.633′ W).

Major Rue later reported that Morgan, upon first seeing Rue and his troops approaching, attempted to surrender to one of his prisoners, an Ohio Militia captain named Burbridge, who then immediately tried to parole Morgan and his fellow officers, an act that would have allowed them to return home to Kentucky as noncombatants. Rue disregarded that "surrender" and insisted that Morgan formally surrender to the Union forces, ignoring the paroles. Troops escorted Morgan to Columbus, Ohio, where he and many of his officers were imprisoned in the Ohio Penitentiary. Many of his captured soldiers were sent to Camp Chase and other prisoner-of-war camps in the North.

In July and August 1863, Ohio Governor David Tod led an inquiry into Morgan's surrender. Governor Tod concluded that Captain Burbridge was actually James Burbick, a private citizen of New Lisbon, Ohio, who had never served as an officer in the Ohio Militia. As such, Governor Tod ruled that he had no authority over Morgan and that Morgan's surrender to Union forces stood.

== Superlative dispute ==
Another Confederate action, the St. Albans Raid, was farther north than the Battle of Salineville. On October 19, 1864, 21 Confederates slipped southward from Canada and raided St. Albans, Vermont. However, the Vermont raiders were not an official command of the Confederate army; historians connect the St. Albans raid to the Confederate Secret Service. Morgan's place of surrender at West Point is considered the northernmost point reached by an officially organized Confederate body during the Civil War.

== See also ==
- John H. Morgan Surrender Site
