= Robert Allen (general) =

American Union Army quartermaster and general (1811–1886)

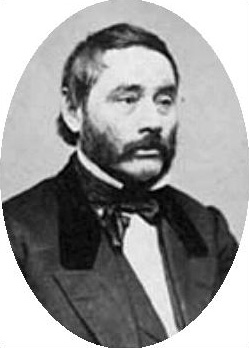
- Robert Allen
- Born: March 15, 1811; West Point, Ohio, U.S.
- Died: August 5, 1886 (aged 75); Switzerland
- Burial place: Cimetière de Chêne-Bougeries in Chêne-Bougeries, Canton of Geneva, Switzerland
- Military career
- Allegiance: United States; Union
- Branch: United States Army; Union Army
- Service years: 1836–1878
- Rank: Brigadier General; Brevet Major General
- Units: 2nd U.S. Artillery; Quartermaster Corps
- Conflicts: Second Seminole War; Mexican–American War; Siege of Veracruz; Battle of Cerro Gordo; Battle of Contreras; Battle of Churubusco; American Civil War

Robert Allen (March 15, 1811 – August 5, 1886) was a career officer in the United States Army, serving as a brigadier general during the American Civil War.

== Early life and career ==
Allen was born in tiny West Union, Adams County, Ohio, and was educated in the public schools. He received an appointment to the United States Military Academy and graduated in 1836, ranking 33rd out of 49 cadets. He was assigned as a second lieutenant in the 2nd U.S. Artillery and assigned to garrison duty in various outposts.

He saw his first combat during the Mexican–American War, where he received a brevet promotion to major for his actions at the Battle of Cerro Gordo. Allen was transferred to the Quartermaster's Department, and was eventually promoted to the chief quartermaster at Benicia, California, for the Department of the Pacific with the permanent rank of major.

In December 1851, Allen served as a judge in the court martial of Joseph Hooker. Hooker was the assistant adjutant general of the Pacific Division in Sonoma, California. He faced charges of conduct unbecoming an officer and a gentleman for profiteering from the army.

== Civil War service ==
At the outbreak of the Civil War, Allen was reassigned to the Department of the Missouri, where he was again chief quartermaster, as well as a colonel. Becoming recognized for his efficiency, he was soon promoted to command the supplies for the entire Mississippi Valley. From his headquarters in Louisville, Kentucky, Allen supervised the Federal supplies for all the region's major campaigns, including Vicksburg and Atlanta. He was able to secure a wide variety of surplus railcars from various Northern railroads and arranged to have them ferried across the Ohio River from Jeffersonville, Indiana, and used for military purposes to transport food and supplies to the field armies along former Confederate railways.

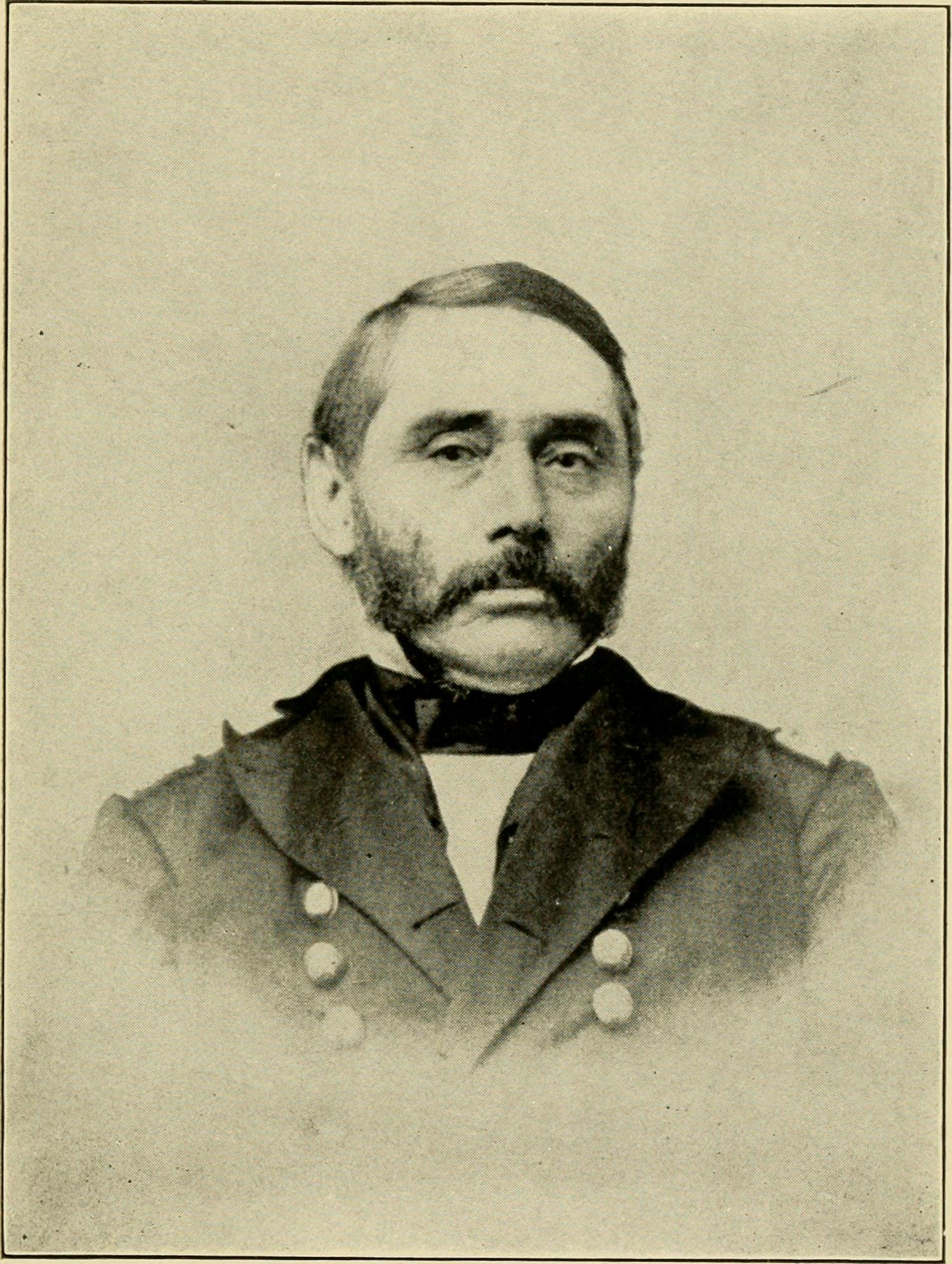

As a result of his performance, he was promoted to brigadier general and given command all quartermaster operations west of the Mississippi River, except for California. Allen ranked only behind Quartermaster General Montgomery C. Meigs (a fellow USMA 1836 graduate) in terms of responsibility and influence. His efficiency in large scale logistics helped ensure that the Federal armies in his theater of war were much better equipped and fed than their Confederate opponents.

On January 16, 1866, President Andrew Johnson nominated Allen for the award of the brevet grade of major general to rank from March 13, 1865, and the U.S. Senate confirmed the award on March 12, 1866. On July 17, 1866, President Johnson nominated Allen for the award of the brevet grade of major general, U.S. Army, also to rank from March 13, 1865, and the U.S. Senate confirmed the award on July 23, 1866. He was mustered out of the volunteer service on September 1, 1866.

== Postbellum ==
After the war, Allen stayed in the Regular Army until his retirement on March 21, 1878, as the army's assistant quartermaster general, at the permanent grade of colonel, spending some $111 million during his lengthy career.

Allen died in Europe while traveling.

== See also ==
- List of American Civil War generals (Union)
- Louisville in the American Civil War
