= 17th Kentucky Infantry Regiment =

- Active: September 1861 to January 23, 1865
- Country: United States
- Allegiance: Union
- Branch: Infantry
- Size: 1,473
- Engagements: Battle of Fort Donelson; Battle of Shiloh; Siege of Corinth; Tullahoma Campaign; Battle of Chickamauga; Battle of Missionary Ridge; Atlanta campaign Battle of Resaca; Battle of Kennesaw Mountain; Siege of Atlanta; Battle of Jonesboro; Battle of Franklin

The 17th Kentucky Infantry Regiment was an infantry regiment that served in the Union Army during the American Civil War.

== Service ==
The 17th Kentucky Infantry Regiment was organized at Hartford and Calhoun, Kentucky, and mustered in for a three-year enlistment in December 1861 under the command of Colonel John Hardin McHenry Jr. Colonel McHenry was relieved of command on December 4, 1862, for issuing an order to his men to return runaway slaves to their masters, which was contrary to standing orders.

The regiment was attached to 13th Brigade, Army of the Ohio, to December 1861. 13th Brigade, 5th Division, Army of the Ohio, to February 1862. 1st Brigade, 3rd Division, Army of the Tennessee, to March 1862. 3rd Brigade, 4th Division, Army of the Tennessee, to April 1862. 10th Brigade, 4th Division, Army of the Ohio, to July 1862. 9th Brigade, 3rd Division, Army of the Ohio, to September 1862. District of Western Kentucky, Department of the Ohio, to November 1862. Post of Clarksville, Tennessee, Department of the Cumberland, to March 1863. 1st Brigade, 3rd Division, XXI Corps, Army of the Cumberland, to October 1863. 3rd Brigade, 3rd Division, IV Corps, to January 1865.

The 17th Kentucky Infantry mustered out of service at Louisville, Kentucky, on January 23, 1865.

== Detailed service ==
Duty at Calhoun, Ky., until February 1862. Action at Woodbury, Ky., October 29, 1861. Morgantown October 31. Moved to Fort Donelson, Tenn., February 11–13. Investment and capture of Fort Donelson, Tenn., February 13–16. Expedition to Crump's Landing, Tenn., March 14–17. Battle of Shiloh, Tenn., April 6–7. Advance on and siege of Corinth, Miss., April 29-May 30. Bridge Creek before Corinth May 28. Pursuit to Booneville May 31-June 12. Buell's Campaign in northern Alabama and middle Tennessee June to August. March to Nashville, Tenn., thence to Louisville, Ky., in pursuit of Bragg August 21-September 26. Moved to Bowling Green, Ky., thence to Russellsville, Ky., and duty there until December. Ordered to Clarksville, Tenn., and duty there until March 1863. Moved to Nashville, Tenn., thence to Murfreesboro, Tenn., and duty there until June. Tullahoma Campaign June 23-July 7. At McMinnville until August 16. Passage of Cumberland Mountains and Tennessee River and Chickamauga Campaign August 16-September 22. Battle of Chickamauga September 19–20. Siege of Chattanooga, September 24-November 23. Chattanooga-Ringgold Campaign November 23–27. Orchard Knob November 23–24. Missionary Ridge November 25, March to relief of Knoxville November 28-December 8. Operations in eastern Tennessee December 1863 to April 1864. Moved to Cleveland, Tenn. Atlanta Campaign May to September. Demonstration on Rocky Faced Ridge May 8–11. Battle of Resaca May 14–15. Adairsville May 17. Near Kingston May 18–19. Near Cassville May 19. Advance on Dallas May 22–25. Operations on Pumpkin Vine Creek and battles about Dallas, New Hope Church and Allatoona Hills May 25-June 5. Pickett's Mills May 27. Ackworth June 6. Operations about Marietta and against Kennesaw Mountain June 10-July 2. Pine Hill June 11–14. Lost Mountain June 15–17. Assault on Kennesaw June 26. Ruff's Station July 4. Chattahoochie River July 5–17. Peachtree Creek July 19–20. Siege of Atlanta July 22-August 25. Flank movement on Jonesboro August 25–30. Battle of Jonesboro August 31-September 1. Lovejoy's Station September 2–6. Operations against Hood in northern Georgia and northern Alabama September 29-November 3. Moved to Nashville and Pulaski, Tenn. Columbia, Duck River, November 24–27. Battle of Franklin November 30. Ordered to Louisville, Ky., December.

== Casualties ==
The regiment lost a total of 298 men during service; 7 officers and 128 enlisted men killed or mortally wounded, 5 officers and 158 enlisted men died of disease.

== Commanders ==
- Colonel John Hardin McHenry Jr.
- Colonel Alexander Miller Stout

== See also ==
- List of Kentucky Civil War Units
- Kentucky in the Civil War
