= James M. Shackelford =

American lawyer

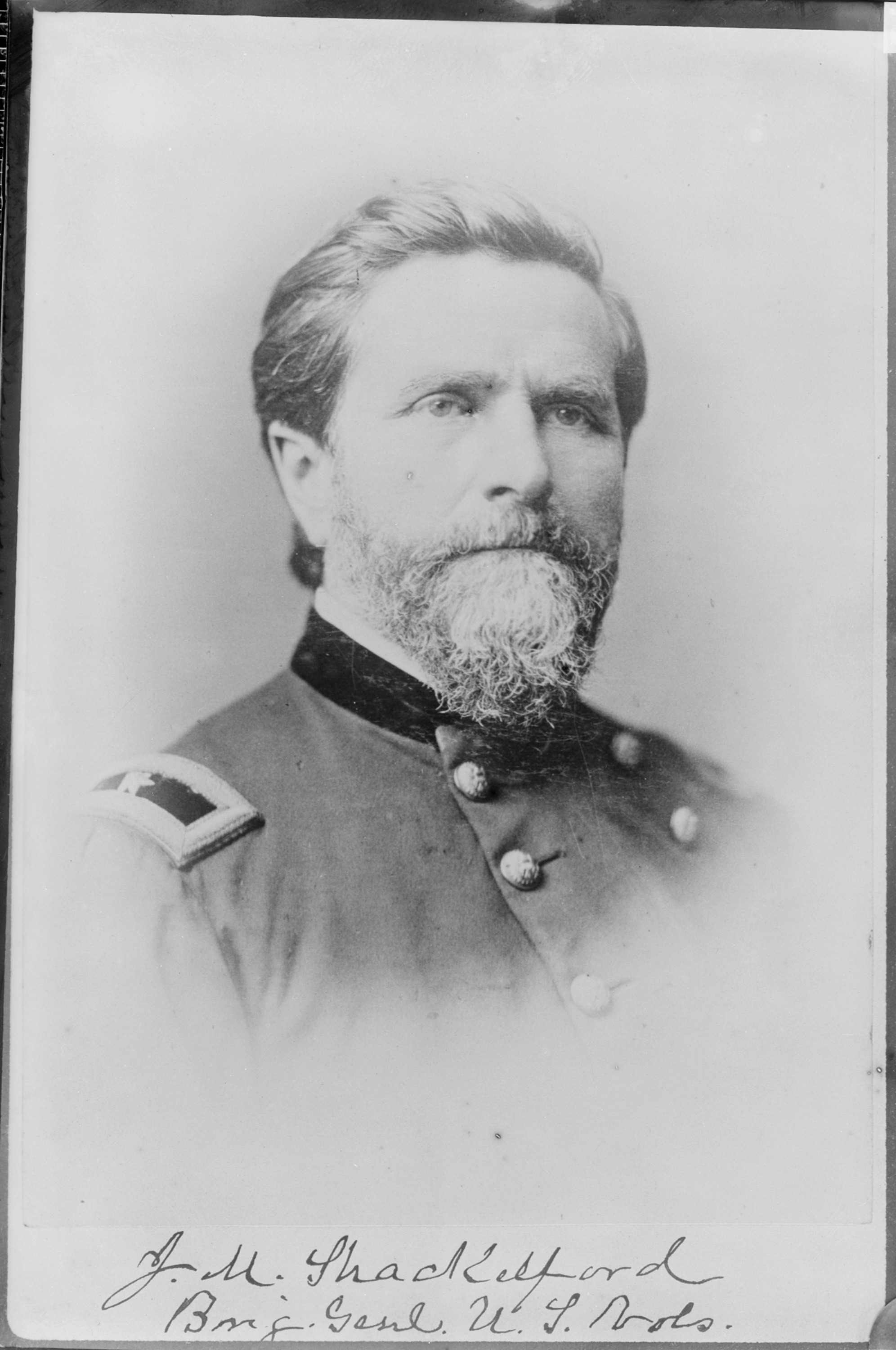
- Born: July 7, 1827; Lincoln County, Kentucky
- Died: September 7, 1909 (aged 82); Port Huron, Michigan
- Burial place: Cave Hill Cemetery, Louisville, Kentucky
- Military career
- Allegiance: United States; Union
- Branch: United States Army; Union Army
- Service years: 1847–1848, 1861–1864
- Rank: Brigadier General
- Commands: 25th Kentucky Infantry Regiment; 8th Kentucky Cavalry Regiment; 4th Division, XIII Corps; Cavalry Corps, Army of the Ohio
- Conflicts: Mexican War; American Civil War; Battle of Fort Donelson; Battle of Buffington Island; Battle of New Lisbon; Battle of the Cumberland Gap; Battle of Blountville; Battle of Campbell's Station; Siege of Knoxville; Battle of Bean's Station
- Other work: lawyer judge

Justice of the United States Court for the Indian Territory
- In office March 26, 1889 – March 27, 1893
- Appointed by: Benjamin Harrison
- Preceded by: Position established (Note: Shackelford is sometimes listed as succeeding Isaac C. Parker because Parker's court had jurisdiction over Indian Territory, however Parker served on the United States District Court for the Western District of Arkansas and not the United States Court for the Indian Territory.)
- Succeeded by: Charles Bingley Stuart

James Murrell Shackelford (July 7, 1827 – September 7, 1907) was a lawyer, judge, and general in the Union Army during the American Civil War. He has the distinction of having captured Confederate cavalry commander John Hunt Morgan in mid-1863, effectively ending "Morgan's Raid".

== Early life ==
Shackelford was born in Lincoln County, Kentucky near Danville on July 7, 1827, to Edmund Shackelford and Susan Thompson. He enrolled at Stamford University at the age of 12, studying under James F. Baber. At 19 Shackelford joined a regiment of Kentucky volunteers as a first lieutenant to fight in the Mexican War, but the war was over by the time the regiment reached the front.

In July, 1848, he returned to Kentucky and began studying law under Judge Cook of Madisonville, Kentucky. He was admitted to the bar in 1851. His legal career was interrupted by the American Civil War.

== Civil War service ==
Shackelford was appointed colonel of the 25th Kentucky Infantry on January 1, 1862. His regiment joined Lew Wallace's division during the Battle of Fort Donelson. Exposure to the elements at Fort Donelson forced Shackelford to resign on March 24, 1862, on account of poor health. During his convalescence, Shackelford helped recruit another regiment of Kentucky volunteers which was mustered in as the 8th Kentucky Cavalry with Shackelford as colonel. A few months later, on January 1, 1863, he was promoted to Brigadier General of Volunteers and assigned to command the 1st Brigade, 2nd Division, XXIII Corps.

In July of that year, Shackelford took part in Edward Hobson's expedition in pursuit of the noted Confederate raider, John Hunt Morgan. Union forces caught up with Morgan at the Battle of Buffington Island in southern Ohio. Half of the Confederate force surrendered but nearly 400, including Morgan escaped along the north bank of the Ohio River. Shackelford's brigade finally cut off Morgan's remaining force at the Battle of Salineville in northeastern Ohio.

Later that year, as Ambrose E. Burnside marched toward Knoxville, Tennessee, he bypassed the Cumberland Gap, leaving a single brigade posted there. Burnside occupied Knoxville on September 1, 1863, and turned his attention back to the Cumberland Gap, dispatching Shackelford's brigade. Shackelford demanded that Confederate general John W. Frazer surrender the gap, but Frazer refused. Burnside personally arrived with reinforcements and forced the Confederates to surrender. Later in the month, Shackelford was promoted to command a division in the XXIII Corps and then in November to command of the Cavalry Corps in the Army of the Ohio. Shackelford's cavalry helped to secure the vital cross roads at the Battle of Campbell's Station and participated in the Siege of Knoxville. When James Longstreet's Confederate forces retreated from Knoxville, Shackelford was sent in pursuit. He caught up with the Confederates, but in the Battle of Bean's Station Longstreet checked the Union pursuit before withdrawing from the region.

On January 18, 1864, Shackelford unexpectedly resigned from the army on account of the death of his wife. After resigning he moved to Evansville, Indiana.

== Indian Territory ==
In 1883, Congress realized that legal issues in Indian Territory had overwhelmed the resources of Judge Isaac C. Parker's court in Fort Smith, Arkansas. It decided that Indian Territory should have its own Federal court, which it created on January 6, 1883. It began this process by assigning portions of the Territory to Judicial Districts in Kansas and Texas. All of Indian Territory north of the Canadian River and east of the 100th meridian, except for the Cherokee, Creek and Seminole nations were attached to the District of Kansas, which had courthouses at Wichita and Fort Scott, Kansas. (Also included in this transfer were the Cherokee Outlet and selected rapidly-growing towns such as Enid, Guymon and Woodward). All of the remaining Indian Territory, except the Chickasaw and Choctaw Nations, was attached to the Northern District of Texas, whose courthouse was at Graham, Texas. Indian country west of the 100th meridian and the Oklahoma panhandle were left outside the scope of either federal or state jurisdictions.

On March 23, 1889, President Benjamin Harrison nominated Shackelford to the newly created United States Court for the Indian Territory and his appointment was confirmed by the Senate on March 26. In 1889, he was elected the president of the Indian Territory Bar Association. He was succeeded in office by Charles Bingley Stuart on March 27, 1893. After leaving the bench, he remained in Muskogee, Oklahoma, and practiced law.

=== Death and burial ===
James M. Shackelford died in the fall of 1909 at his summer home in Port Huron, Michigan. He is interred in Cave Hill Cemetery in Louisville, Kentucky.

== Works cited ==
- Eicher, John H., and Eicher, David J., Civil War High Commands, Stanford University Press, 2001, ISBN 0-8047-3641-3.
- Logan, James K. ed. The Federal Courts of the Tenth Circuit:A History, Volumes 62–63. 1992. Available on Google Books.
