= Battle of Corydon =

Battle of the American Civil War

- Part of the American Civil War
- Map showing Morgan's Raid in the Harrison and Washington County area, and the location of the battle.
Date	July 9, 1863
Location	Corydon, Indiana, U.S. 38.20°N 86.13°W
Result	Confederate victory

Belligerents
Confederate States of America	United States

Commanders and leaders
John H. Morgan	Lewis Jordan

Units involved
Morgan's Cavalry Division	Indiana Legion

Strength
1,800; 4 artillery pieces	400–450

Casualties and losses
11 killed^{1} 40 wounded^{3}	4 killed^{2} 10–12 wounded 355 captured
- ^{1}One additional Confederate was killed by a civilian before the battle began ^{2}Three civilians were killed by Confederates. Two Legion defenders were also killed during the crossing of the Ohio River the day before the battle.^{3}One Confederate was wounded during the crossing of the Ohio River

The Battle of Corydon was a minor engagement that took place July 9, 1863, just south of Corydon, which had been the original capital of Indiana until 1825, and was the county seat of Harrison County. The attack occurred during Morgan's Raid in the American Civil War as a force of 2,500 cavalry invaded the North in support of the Tullahoma Campaign. It was the only pitched battle of the Civil War that occurred in Indiana, and no battle has occurred within Indiana since.

As news of an impending raid spread across the state, Governor Oliver P. Morton called out the state's militia force, the Indiana Legion, to defend against the threat. Unaware of the size of the invading army, four companies of the 6th and 8th Regiments of the Legion, totaling about one hundred men, attempted to prevent the Confederates from crossing the Ohio River into Indiana, but were overcome by superior artillery fire which killed two of the defenders. The units retreated northward where they met with the main body of the 6th Regiment under the command of Col. Lewis Jordan. Along with the townspeople, they constructed breastworks that formed a defensive line south of Corydon. Despite promises of reinforcements from regional Legion commanders in New Albany, only about 450 men (consisting almost entirely of locals) were defending the town.

As the raiders approached from the south, the advance elements formed a battle line and launched a frontal attack and an unsuccessful flanking movement against the east side of the Legion's works. Reinforcements and artillery soon arrived with the main body of Confederate troops, giving the attackers a strong numerical superiority. With the support of the artillery, a pincer movement caused the Legion to abandon their position to avoid being surrounded. A large part of the Legion were captured as they attempted to escape from the town, while Col. Jordan and others regrouped downtown. Confederates then seized the Legion's commissary supplies on the edge of town, and fired two warning shots into the downtown from their artillery, convincing Jordan that continued resistance was futile and leading him to surrender his force and Corydon. Although the short battle cost the cavalry twice as many casualties as the outnumbered militia units, the battle resulted in a Confederate victory, which enabled Brig. Gen. John H. Morgan to secure supplies and money before continuing his raid through Indiana and into Ohio. The delay, however, proved critical in helping the pursuing Union army overtake and later capture Morgan and his forces.

== Prelude ==
In December 1862, a regiment of Union cavalry was stationed in south central Indiana for defensive purposes, in anticipation of Confederate raids. After patrolling the border for several months, no new raids materialized, and they were withdrawn in March 1863, leaving only the local militia for defense.

=== Advance through Kentucky ===
On June 23, 1863, Brig. Gen. John H. Morgan led a cavalry division consisting of two brigades, totaling nearly 2,500 men, and two batteries of artillery, northward from Tennessee in the Confederacy. (Note: Morgan's artillery consisted of two 3-inch Parrott rifles, and two 12-pound howitzers. (Conway, p. 31)) His movements began as a ride into Kentucky to disrupt the communications of the Union Army of the Cumberland in support of Gen. Braxton Bragg's Army of Tennessee during the Tullahoma Campaign. Bragg had ordered Morgan to attack any settlements of his choosing in Kentucky, but not to cross the Ohio River into Union territory. Bragg was worried about Morgan getting too far from the main army and being unable to come to his aid should it be needed. Morgan was already planning to disregard the orders and had sent scouts beyond the river before leaving Tennessee. Crossing the Cumberland River at Burkesville, Kentucky, Morgan's column advanced to the Green River, where it was deflected by a Union regiment at Tebbs Bend on July 4. Morgan surprised and captured the garrison of Lebanon, and then rode northward via Springfield, Bardstown and Garnettsville.

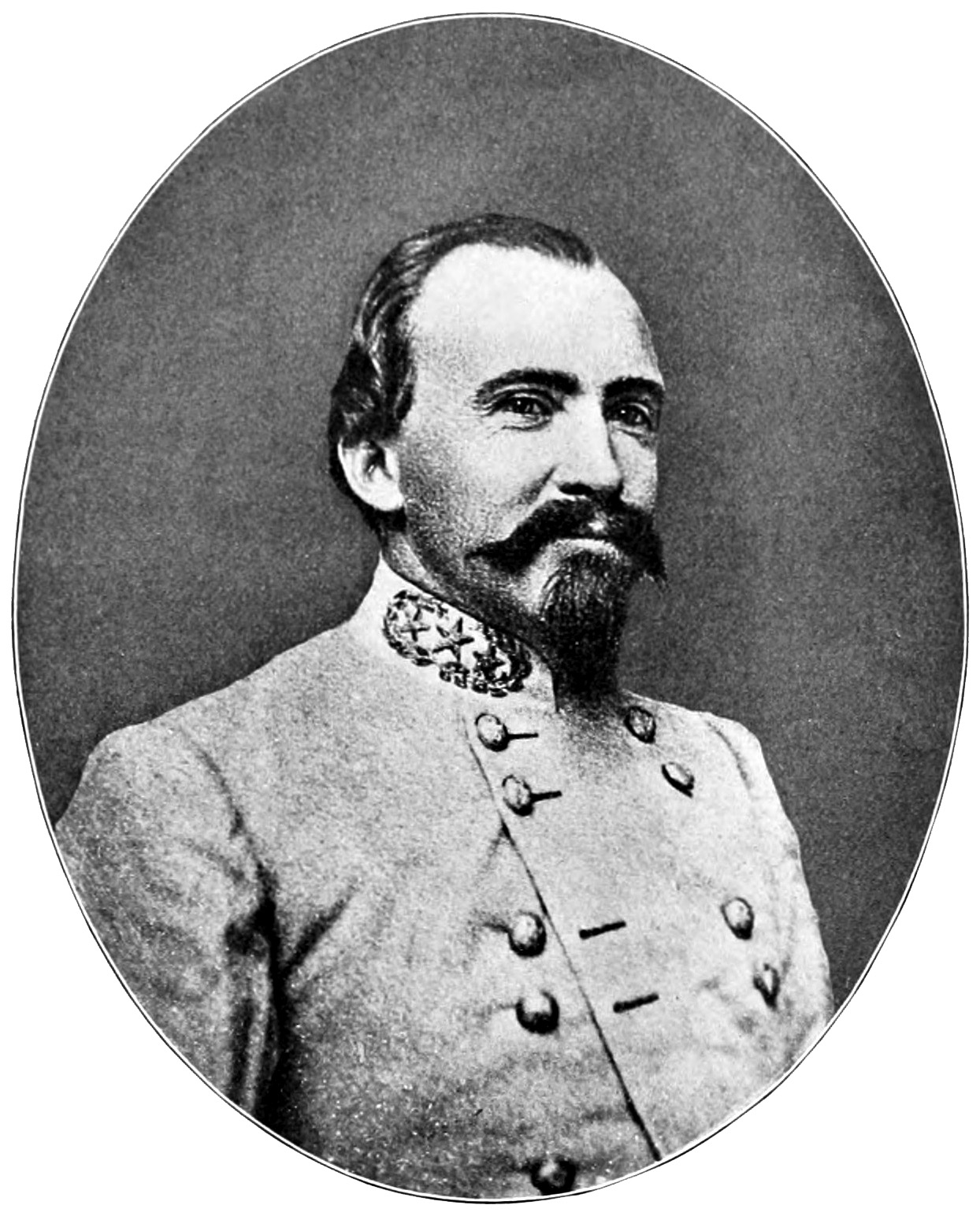
Confederate Brig. Gen. John H. Morgan

Morgan had his men tap the Union telegraph lines and send conflicting reports about his strength and destination, with many indicating that his target was Louisville, Kentucky. Not taking any chances, Governor of Indiana Oliver P. Morton telegraphed orders calling out all the state's militia, the Indiana Legion, south of the National Road.

In the afternoon of July 7 an advance force of Confederates entered Brandenburg, Kentucky, where they rendezvoused with Capt. Thomas Hines, who assumed command. Hines had led a reconnaissance mission into Indiana in search of Confederate sympathizers to support Morgan's coming raid. He did not find the support he was looking for, and had been pursued by elements of the 6th and 8th Regiment of the Indiana Legion who killed three of his men and captured several others before the remainder escaped back into Kentucky. Since then he had been waiting in the Brandenburg area for Morgan to arrive. The Ohio River was swollen from recent rain, making any hope of fording it impossible and requiring that the Confederates secure boats to ferry their men across. Under Hines' guidance, the Confederates set an ambush to capture the steamship John T. McCombs as it landed in Brandenburg to deliver the mail. (Note: The steamship J.T. McCombs is variously reported as T.J. McCombs (Wolfe 1863), John B. McCombs (Walsh 2006, Brandenburg historical marker), J.T. McCombs (Senour 1865), John T. McCombs (Matthews 2005) and J.T. McCoombs (Terrell 1867). The McCombs was operated by Capt. Ballard, friend of Col. Duke, Morgan's second in command. Duke's family had used the McCombs for commercial purposes prior to the war. (Matthews 2005 op. cit.)) The one ship would not be enough to allow the Confederate division to quickly cross the river, so to capture another boat the McCombs was used to simulate a distress call to lure in the fast sidewheel steamer Alice Dean. As the unsuspecting ship moved alongside the McCombs, the Confederates on board sprung out, lashed the two ships together, and boarded the Alice Dean. Taking the two ships back to shore, they released the crew and passengers just as Morgan arrived with the main body of the army. Some of the passengers escaped the town and sent message to commanders in Louisville of the Confederate occupation of Brandenburg.

=== Battle of Brandenburg Crossing ===
Indiana militia leaders learned of Morgan's capture of Brandenburg, ten miles south of Corydon, and his intent to cross into Indiana in a dispatch from Regular Army commanders in Louisville. All the roads Morgan would likely take northward intersected at Corydon. Emergency requests for reinforcements were sent out from the town in all directions. New Albany leaders sent word promising to send a thousand men. Other companies around Harrison County immediately began to gather and advance to Corydon. Three companies of the 6th Regiment Indiana Legion based in Mauckport and totaling about one hundred men moved to Morvin's Landing, the north bank of the river opposite Brandenburg, to contest the crossing. A thirty-man company of the 8th Regiment of the Indiana Legion based in Leavenworth and under the command of Capt. G.W. Lyon, was transported to Morvin's landing by the Lady Pike during the night. They brought with them their town's ceremonial 8-pound cannon which they deployed and camouflaged on a small bluff in front of an abandoned log cabin. (Note: The cannon had fortunately been brought out of storage a week earlier for Fourth of July celebrations. (Conway, p. 50))

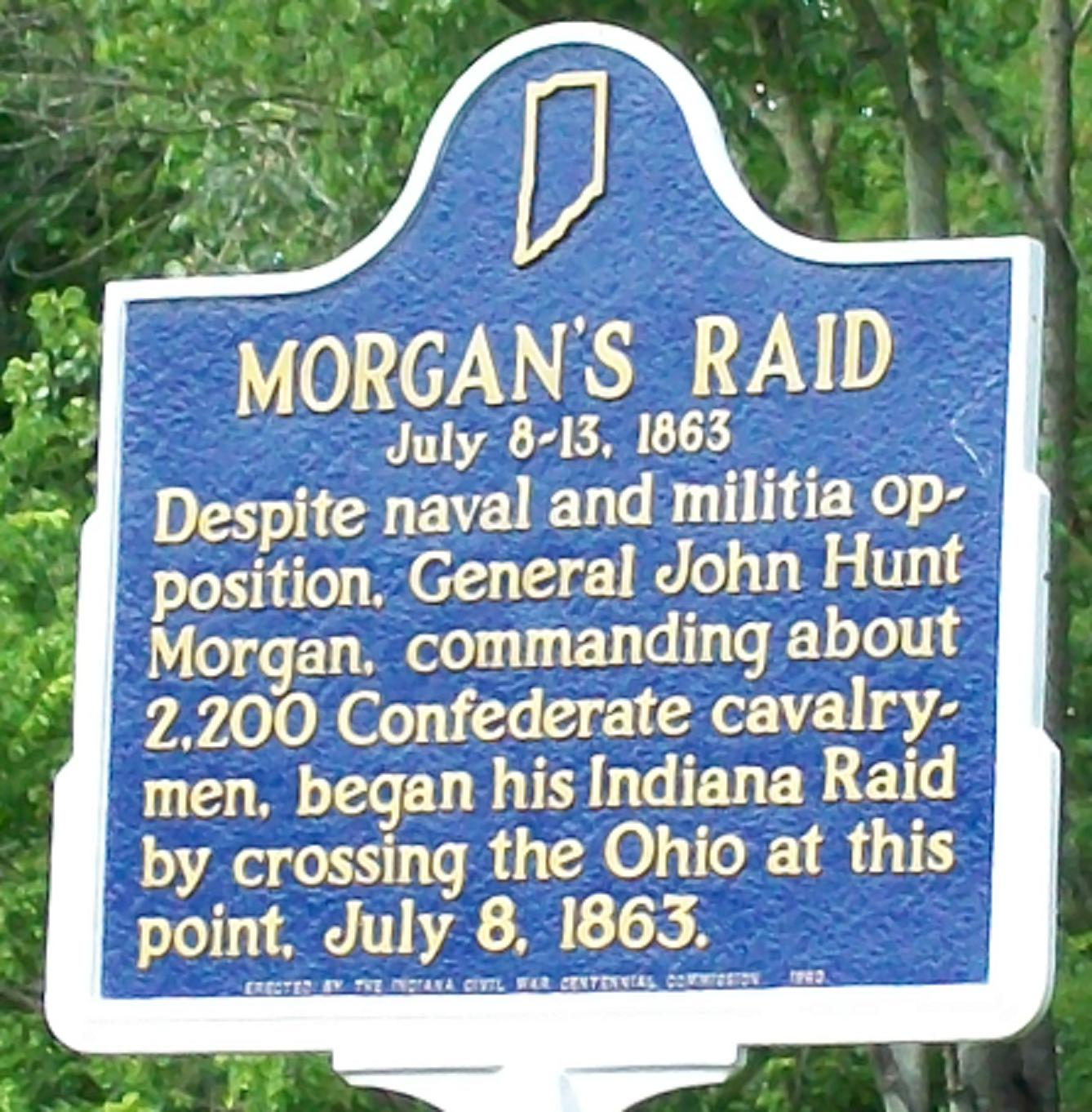
Historical marker at Morvin's Landing, near Mauckport, Indiana

On the morning of July 8, Lyon opened fire on the Alice Dean, intending to destroy or disable the steamers. The men had only ever fired the cannon at celebratory events and were unsure how to aim it properly. Two shots were fired, with the second one hitting the upper deck of the McCombs, passing through the ship and landing near a group of men on the shore, wounding a Confederate. (Note: Although the Ohio River is now 2,500 feet (760 m) wide at this point because of dams that have since been constructed, in 1863 it was only about 1,000 feet (300 m) wide. Morgan's two best cannons could easily hit targets at a distance of 5,000 feet (1,500 m). (Howtzer, p. 52)) Just as the shelling began Provost Marshal John Timberlake arrived on the scene from Corydon with a small company of reinforcements and assumed command. Timberlake, who was a colonel in the regular army, believed Morgan's force was small, and decided to spare the steamships and instead shell the massed cavalry. Before the cannon could be re-aimed, the superior Confederate artillery was set up and returned fire from their significantly higher position on the opposite side of the river. The dense morning fog in the valley obliged the Confederates to guess at their target. Their first shot landed short of the Legion's position, and the second shot landed behind them and leveled the cabin. The Legion defenders set off a third shot that had already been loaded into their cannon, and fled into a nearby forest. As they moved up the ridge and into the woods, they became visible to the Confederate artillery who began to shell the forest. One shot struck a log where two of the defenders had stopped to rest. They were mortally wounded while the rest fled into the forest as the Confederates continued to shell the landing.

With the resistance seemingly at an end, Morgan began crossing his troops in the captured steamers. The first company to land moved up the ridge on the north shore and engaged the Legion defenders in a skirmish. Union commanders in Louisville had sent out requests for naval support in preventing Morgan's crossing when they first received reports from Brandenburg. The tinclad Springfield, armed with six 24-pound howitzers, was at New Albany and was dispatched down-river and arrived on the scene just after Morgan had begun to ferry his force across the river. The Springfield opened fire on Morgan's two steamers who retreated back under the covering fire of the Confederate artillery. The ship began shelling both the north and south shores of the river, firing at least fifty shells into Brandenburg, damaging several buildings and killing three horses. Morgan's forces took cover in nearby forests while the armed steamer and the artillery on the shore dueled for about an hour. Once the Springfield ran out of ammunition she withdrew, allowing Morgan to resume the crossing.

After about half of his army had been ferried into Indiana, the Union gunboat USS Elk and an armed private ship, the Grey Eagle, arrived on the scene. The Elk fired a shot into the deck of the Alice Dean as it tried to escape to the shoreline. Both the Union ships were wooden, and as the Confederate artillery opened fire, they quickly retreated upriver towards Louisville to avoid being destroyed. The crossing resumed again. In total, it took seventeen hours for Morgan to ferry his now 2,000 men and supplies across the river. By listening in on the telegraph, he learned that Brig. Gen. Edward H. Hobson with a force of 4,000 cavalry was advancing on his position from the south. The lead elements of the Union force arrived in Brandenburg at about 8:00 pm, where the Confederate rearguard was able to delay their advance long enough for Morgan's artillery to be carried across the river. On the last trip across, most of the rearguard was able to escape, but several were left behind and captured.

Once the Confederates had crossed the river, the Alice Dean was set ablaze and sunk in the river between Morvin's landing and Mauckport to deny the Union pursuers use of the vessel and to block the landing, making their crossing more difficult. Morgan ordered the McCombs to be burnt, but Col. Duke countermanded the order because of his friendship with its captain. He was allowed to return with his ship to Louisville unharmed. Gen. Hobson and the main body of the Union cavalry arrived in Brandenburg at about 10:15 pm, just as the Alice Dean went under the water. He set up his artillery and fired several shots at the Confederates who jeered at him from the opposite side of the river; they quickly withdrew out of range of his guns. The lead elements of the cavalry had already set out northward following the Legion forces who withdrew gradually and fought delaying skirmishes along the Mauckport road to slow the cavalry's advance towards Corydon.

== Battle ==
=== Skirmishes ===
During the evening, elements of Morgan's division had advanced to within five miles (8.0 km) of Corydon. The four Legion companies that had attempted to prevent the crossing had been reinforced by four additional companies from Corydon, one from Elizabeth, and one from New Amsterdam, making the force about four-hundred strong. They lured a company of unsuspecting Confederates into an ambush where they were surrounded; sixteen were captured and taken to the Corydon jail. The invaders also successfully captured about thirty defenders in several skirmishes. They were rounded up and held in a school house near Laconia. (Note: While in the school, one of the prisoners watched as soldiers torched his nearby gristmill in retribution. The state later reimbursed the man $2,681 for the loss of his mill. (Horwitz, p. 45)) After Morgan crossed the river he addressed the prisoners and told them that if they would promise to go home and not to return to arms, he would allow them to leave and keep their guns. They all agreed and were released.

That night Morgan's men camped at Frakes' Mill just north of Mauckport. They found the area deserted, as all the civilians had fled their homes. In the house where Morgan stayed, the table was set with supper which he and his men ate before resting for the night. Morgan's men tapped the telegraph lines again and began sending false reports that they were headed for New Albany. The disinformation dissuaded New Albany's Legion leaders from sending the large number of reinforcements to Corydon that they had been organizing. The next morning the Confederates resumed their march northward. As they passed up a county road, a shot was fired killing a soldier. The scouts opened fired on a nearby house from which they assumed the shot had come, killing a Lutheran minister and wounding his son. (Note: The minister's home was on the Mauckport Road about 1.5 miles (2.4 km) south of Corydon. It was the minister's elderly father who had fired on the Confederates. (Horwitz, p. 46).)

Corydon was the county seat of Harrison County and the former capital of Indiana. The town and immediate countryside had about one thousand inhabitants. The townspeople had been working all night building a breastwork of criss-crossed logs on a high ridge just south of the town. A pair of Confederate spies had already infiltrated Corydon and reported their findings back to Morgan. As the works were completed, the Legion fell back to the town to take up position behind them. Many older men in the town joined in the defense, swelling their numbers to about 450. Despite the emergency calls for reinforcements to the regional Legion commanders in New Albany, none of their men arrived before the battle began

=== The attack ===
A map of the Battle of Corydon

The Legion's barricade was between four and five feet high (1.5 m) and stretched 2,500 feet (760 m) from the Amsterdam Road on the far western wing to the Laconia Road on the far eastern wing and straddled the Mauckport Road in the center. (Note: The New Amsterdam Road is now Hiedelburg Road. The Mauckport Road is now Old State Road 135 on its northern half, and State Road 135 on its southern half. The Laconia Road is now State Road 337) The 6th Regiment of the Indiana Legion was commanded by the elderly Col. Lewis Jordan, a veteran of the War of 1812. Maj. McGrain, a lieutenant in the Regular Army and recently returning from the war front, was given command of the west wing. Capt. George Lahue, a veteran of the Mexican–American War, was in command of the east wing. Although the commanders were battle hardened, most of the men behind the works had never seen battle. The western wing was heavily wooded, but the slope of the ground prevented the defenders or the attackers from seeing each other until they were within close range. The eastern wing of the works was in a mostly open field and afforded little natural cover to the attackers, while the defenders were protected from gunfire behind their works.

At 11:30 a.m. on July 9, the 3rd Regiment Kentucky Cavalry, the advance element of the Confederate forces under the command of Col. Adam R. Johnson, was sighted moving north along the Mauckport Road towards Corydon. Col. Johnson believed the artillery could have quickly dispersed the four hundred farmers-turned-soldiers, but Morgan was worried about any delay because during the night the Union forces had begun crossing the river in his rear. Morgan's main body with the artillery was still en route, and he decided the Legion should be engaged by the advance forces.

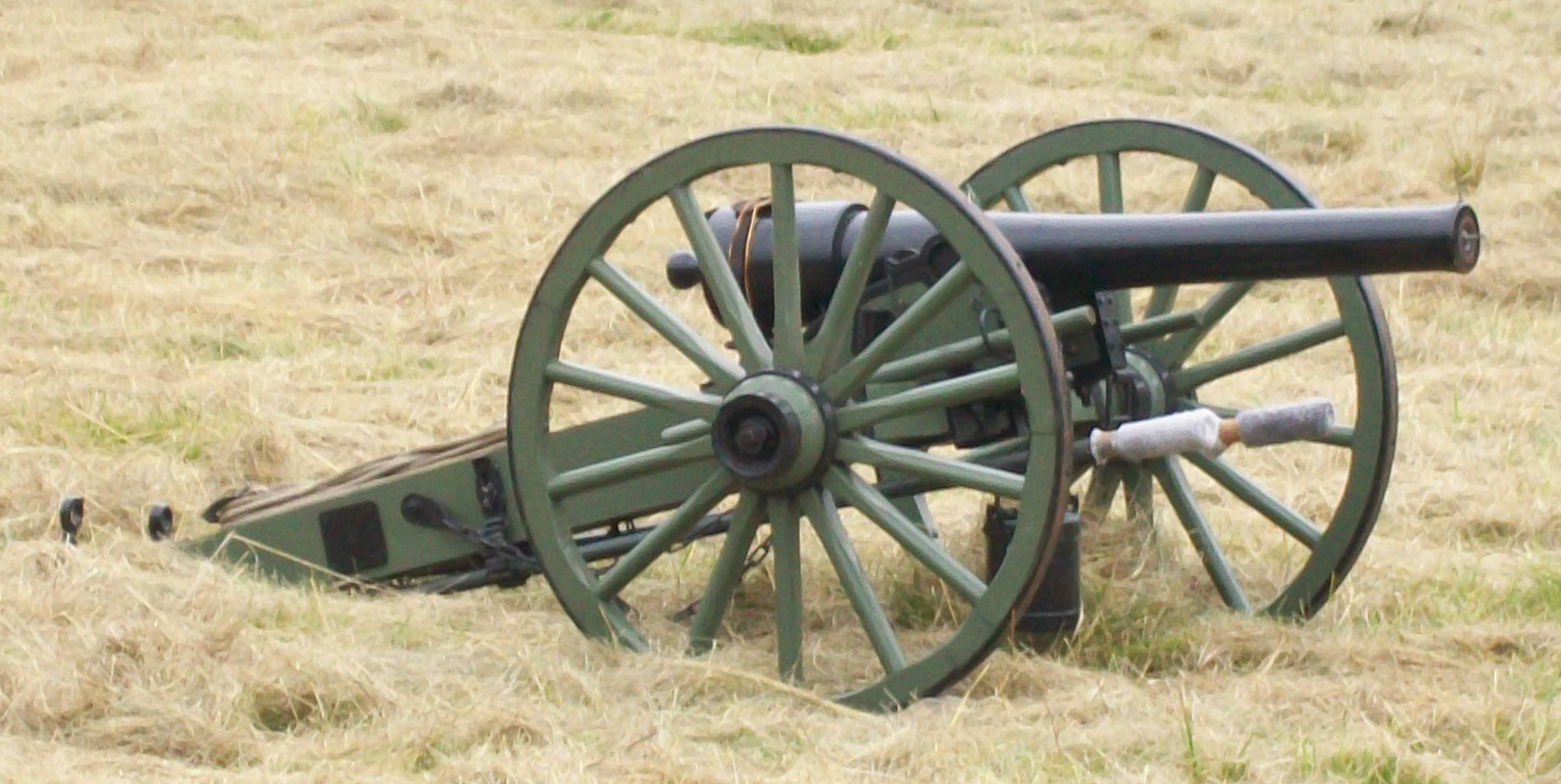
A 10 lb Parrott rifle

By about noon, the Confederates had formed an attack line and were in position to advance on the works. Because of the forest on the west side of the Mauckport Road, a company of men dismounted and attacked the works head on. They were repulsed three times, but the Legion suffered a casualty during the second wave. Simultaneously, the Confederates launched a flanking maneuver on the eastern wing of the defensive works. The initial flanking attempt was prevented because of the superior weapons held by the thirty Legion soldiers on that wing. They were equipped with Henry rifles capable of firing fourteen rounds before reloading, and were able to keep the Confederates pinned down in the open field for about twenty minutes.

Shortly after the third repulse of the Confederates on the western wing, the 2nd Kentucky and 9th Tennessee regiments arrived from the Mauckport Road and joined the battle, giving the attackers a numerical superiority. At about 12:40 p.m., Capt. Byrnes arrived with the Confederate artillery and used his two ten-pound Parrott rifle cannons to pin down the defenders in the works. In the meantime, Morgan was leading his main body of troops far around the eastern edge of the defenses and up the Plank Road, threatening the town directly and bypassing the defenses entirely. As they moved onto the Corydon Pike, they shot and robbed a toll gate keeper who refused to throw down his gun.

=== Legion rout ===
Using the cannons and one infantry battalion to prevent the defenders from maneuvering, Col. Richard Morgan, the general's brother, launched a pincer movement in an attempt to surround the Legion units. With the artillery bearing down on the works, the 2nd Kentucky and 9th Tennessee began to flank the Union defense on the east and west sides respectively. Col. Lewis ordered a retreat to prevent the army from being captured. With their superior numbers, the Confederates were able to move around both ends of the Legion's works and quickly turned the retreat into a rout. The second part of the engagement was over in about twenty-five minutes; in total the battle lasted about one hour. As the Legion fled into the town, many threw their guns into the Indian Creek to prevent them from being captured by the enemy. About one hundred men attempted to escape by the Corydon Pike, unaware that the main Confederate force was advancing up it, and were captured.

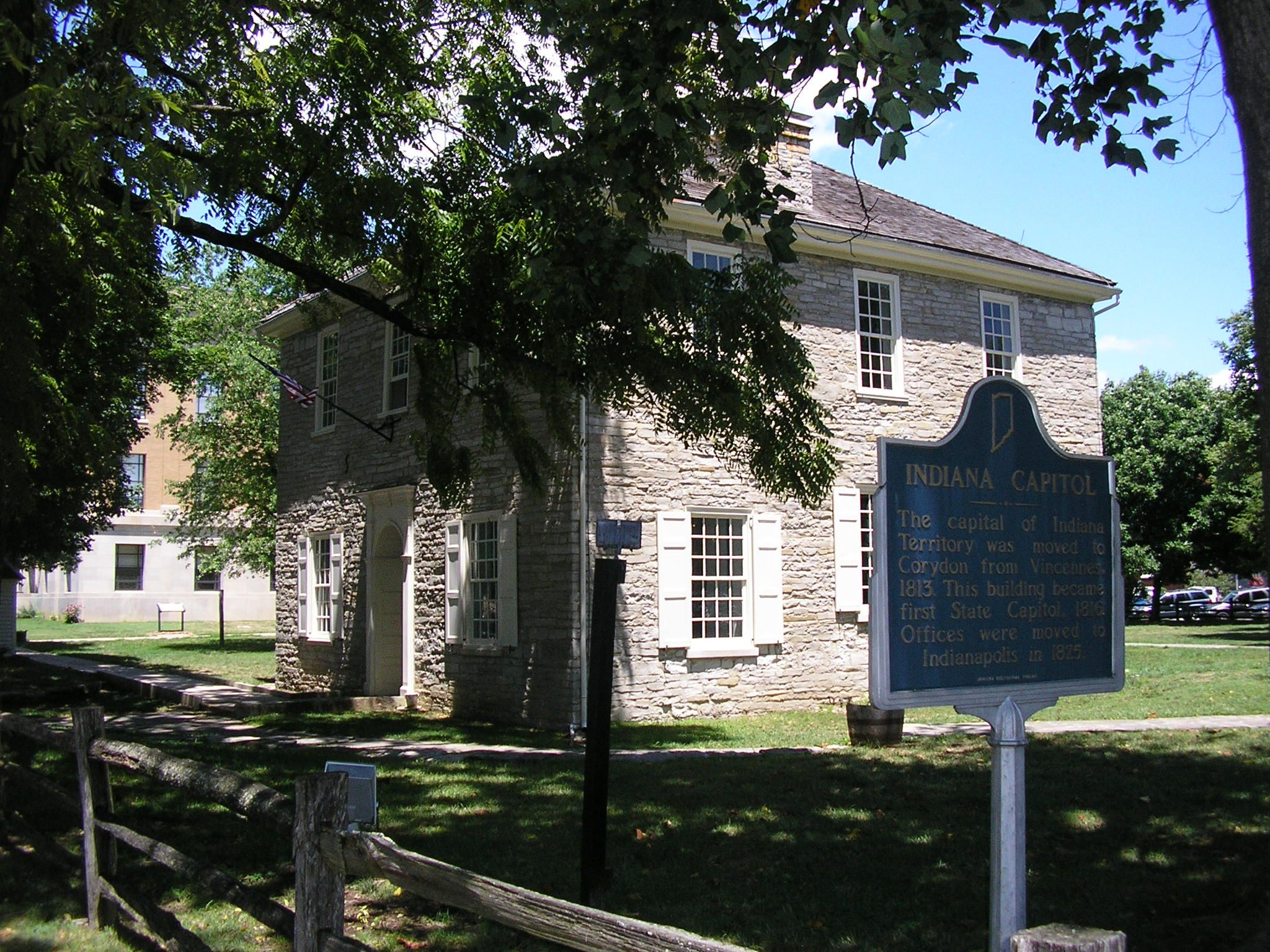
The old state capitol building and then county courthouse where Col. Jordan ran up the white flag

A large part of the Legion force, including Col. Jordan, retreated into the downtown. On the western edge of the town, a company of Confederates seized the Legion's commissary. Morgan took command of the heights south of the town and fired two warning shells from his artillery into Corydon, one landing very near Cedar Glade, now a historic site that keeps a marker at the location where the shot landed. Col. Jordan realized that continued resistance was useless and did not "desire to see the unnecessary loss of life", and promptly surrendered the town by running up a white flag in the town square. The Legion's cavalry and the infantrymen who had mounts were able to escape into the countryside, but almost all the remaining infantry was captured.

Accounts vary as to the number of casualties, but the most reliable evidence suggests that Jordan lost four killed, ten to twelve wounded, and 355 captured—about 100 escaped. After the battle, Morgan counted eleven dead and forty wounded among the raiders, plus one killed while advancing on the town. Additionally, three civilians were killed.

=== List of engagements ===
- July 5, 1863: "Morgan's raid – Lebanon's capture" ("Union: Colonel Charles S. Hansen defending with 325 men of the 20th Kentucky regiment, with no artillery. Union dead: 3; Confederate dead: 56, including General Morgan's brother Tom")
- July 7, 1863: Brandenburg, Kentucky
- July 8, 1863: "Morgan's raid – Ohio River crossing, Alice Dean sunk" ("Union artillery fire on ships is halted. Union 8-pounder on the Indiana side is abandoned and gunboat Springfield retires after a one-hour artillery duel.") By 5 or 6 p.m. the crossing was completed and the Alice Dean was already burning, according to an account by Navy Commander LeRoy Fitch. She burns to her deck and settles at the mouth of Buck Creek. Gunboats Fairplay and Silver Lake arrive an hour later and convoy transports for Hobson's forces that evening.
- July 9, 1863: 12:30 p.m. "Morgan's raid – Corydon defensive line fires on advance elements"
- July 9, 1863: 5:00 p.m. "Morgan's raid – Morgan leaves Corydon after looting it"
- July 10, 1863: 9:00 a.m. "Morgan's raid – Destruction of depot & bridges in Salem"

== Aftermath ==
=== Plundering of Corydon ===
Morgan led his division into Corydon. As the county commissioner exited the courthouse carrying a rifle he was shot dead, becoming the final casualty of the day. Morgan paroled the Legion as if they had been regular soldiers; their weapons and ammunition were seized or destroyed, and they were required to promise not return to arms for a period of time. (Note: The length of the period of time is unknown. Traditionally, it could have been as short as a day, or until the end of the war.) The prisoners in the county jail were freed, including the Confederates who had been captured the previous day. The cavalrymen spent the afternoon plundering stores and collecting ransom money; Morgan threatened to torch three local mills, and demanded each of them pay $1,000 to prevent their destruction. The owners negotiated the rate down to $500. The county treasurer paid $690 to spare the courthouse from being burnt, and two leading stores paid $600 each. His men robbed the townspeople freely, stealing items ranging from ice-skates and bonnets to guns and horses. The total amount taken by ransom and plunder was estimated at $26,450 ($460,873 in 2009 chained dollars). The value of most of the stolen goods and property destruction was later reimbursed, mostly by the state government.

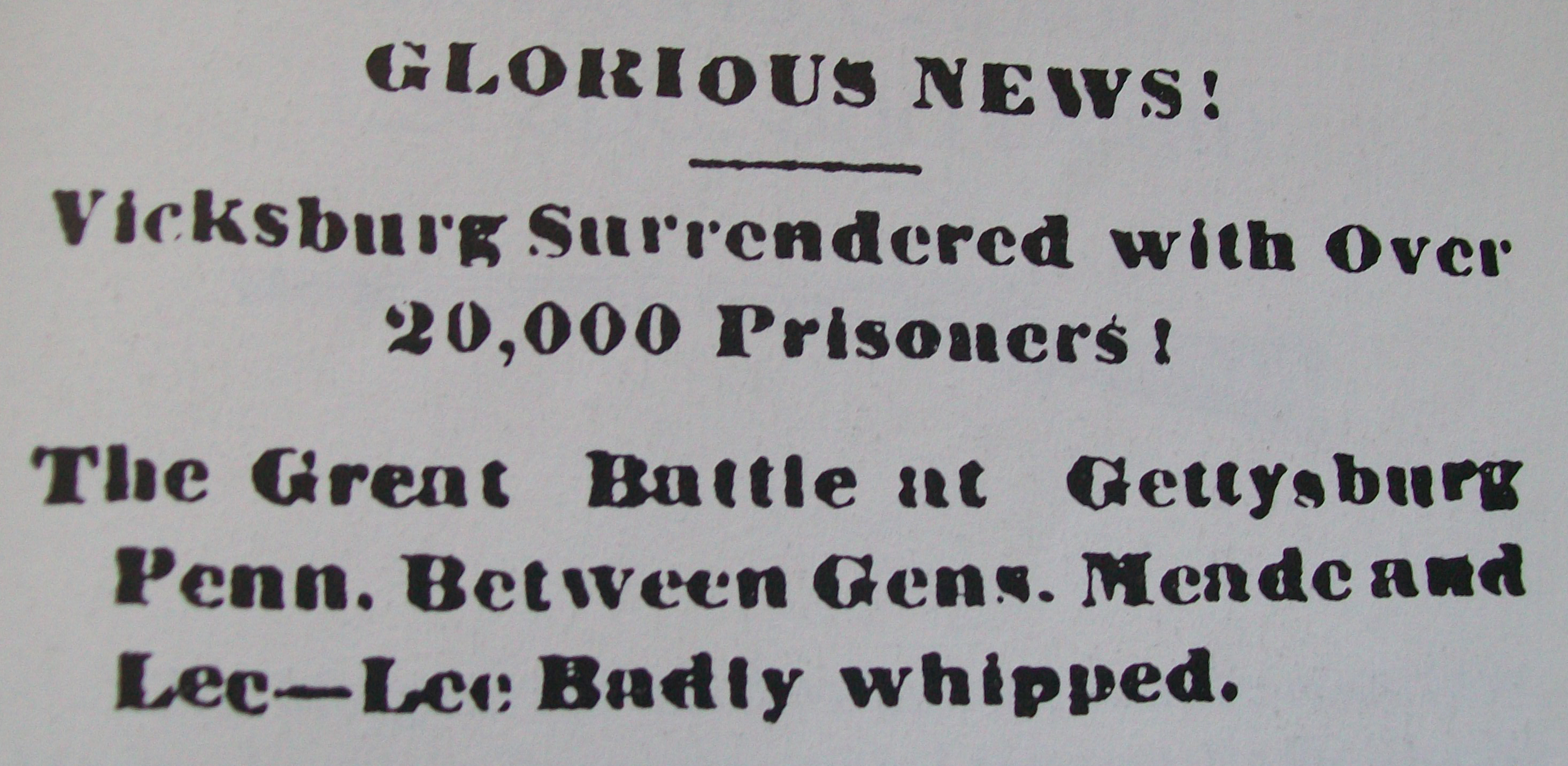
Corydon Democrat headline read by Morgan after taking the town

Morgan ate lunch at the Kintner House Inn where he read a newspaper and learned of the Confederate defeat at Gettysburg and the fall of Vicksburg. The news caused him to realize his army was in serious danger; his hosts later said that upon his reading the paper he was "noticeably crestfallen." Morgan had intended to meet up with the Confederate army in Pennsylvania, but with their forces in retreat this was impossible and began to plan for a safe return across the Ohio River. He had his telegrapher tap the telegraph lines and send false messages indicating he was heading for Indianapolis to free Confederate prisoners of war held at Camp Morton. The Confederate dead were buried in unmarked graves on a farm on the western edge of town. Morgan's wounded were left in the town and were taken into a local Presbyterian church, where they were cared for. The wounded men were paroled after Union troops arrived. Two were taken to the Union army hospital in Jeffersonville, and remained in the town until they were well enough to return home and await their exchange.

=== Continued raid ===
Shortly after looting the town, detachments of raiders left Corydon and continued their raid, scouring the countryside for fresh horses and food. An African American from Corydon was forced to serve as their guide; he led them for two days before escaping and returning home. By about 6:00 pm Morgan and the main body had resumed their march northward, foraging in northern Harrison County before camping a few miles from Corydon, near New Salisbury. They left Harrison County early the next morning heading north.

As soon as he learned of the defeat at Corydon, Governor Morton sent a series of telegrams to Maj. Gen. Ambrose Burnside, commander of the Army of the Ohio, first requesting then demanding the return of two Indiana regiments recently sent to the defense of Louisville, Kentucky. Burnside refused but did order his cavalry to join in the pursuit of Morgan. As Corydon had until recently been capital of Indiana, the defeat was symbolic. The July 10 headline of the Indianapolis Gazettescreamed "Former Capital Corydon Ravaged By Morgan's Raiders; Two Hoosiers Dead."

More than 150,000 men turned out to join Legion units during the next week and began pursuing on Morgan's cavalrymen. Gen. Hobson and his men arrived in Corydon on July 10, after crossing the Ohio River from Kentucky. Although a Confederate victory, the Battle of Corydon had delayed Morgan by six crucial hours, allowing the pursuing Union army to begin closing the gap. Union cavalry numbering six thousand men were soon only a few miles behind him. Morgan briefly continued north and raided Salem. He then turned his men east to Ohio as his raid turned into flight to escape. He was thwarted at the Battle of Buffington Island, where he tried to cross the Ohio River to safety. Only about 250 of his men were across the river, when Union gunboats brought his attempt to an end. Morgan was later captured at the Battle of Salineville, the furthest north regular Confederates ever reached.

Other raids and small skirmishes took place in Indiana during the war, but the Battle of Corydon was the only pitched battle fought in the state. It remains the last military conflict to have occurred in Indiana. In 1976 the site was preserved as the Corydon Battle Site memorial park and was listed on the National Register of Historic Places on July 9, 1979. Today it is part of the John Hunt Morgan Heritage Trail. The battle has been re-enacted each year since 1980.

== Reenactment gallery ==
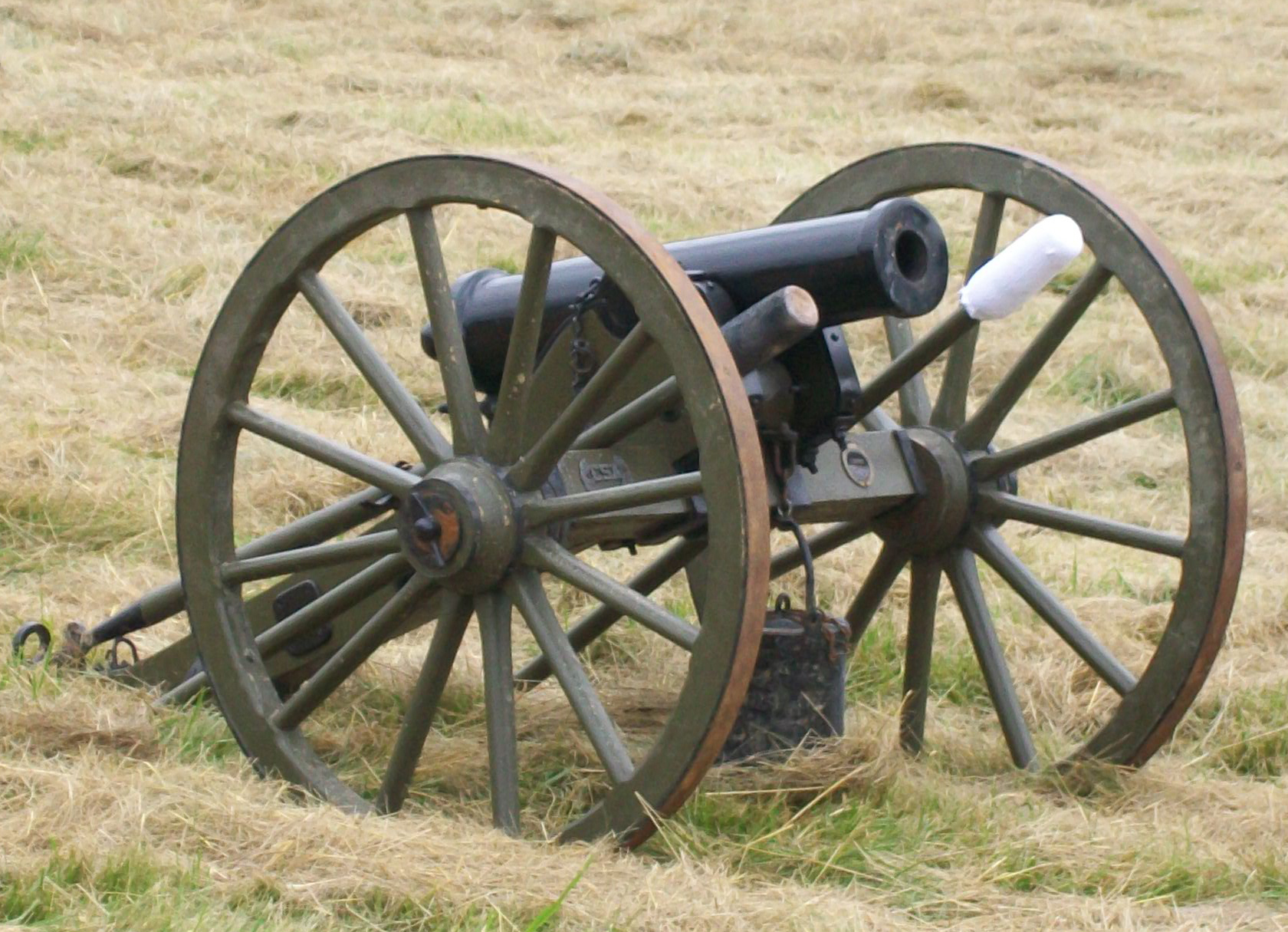
12 lb howitzer cannon like the one used in the battle

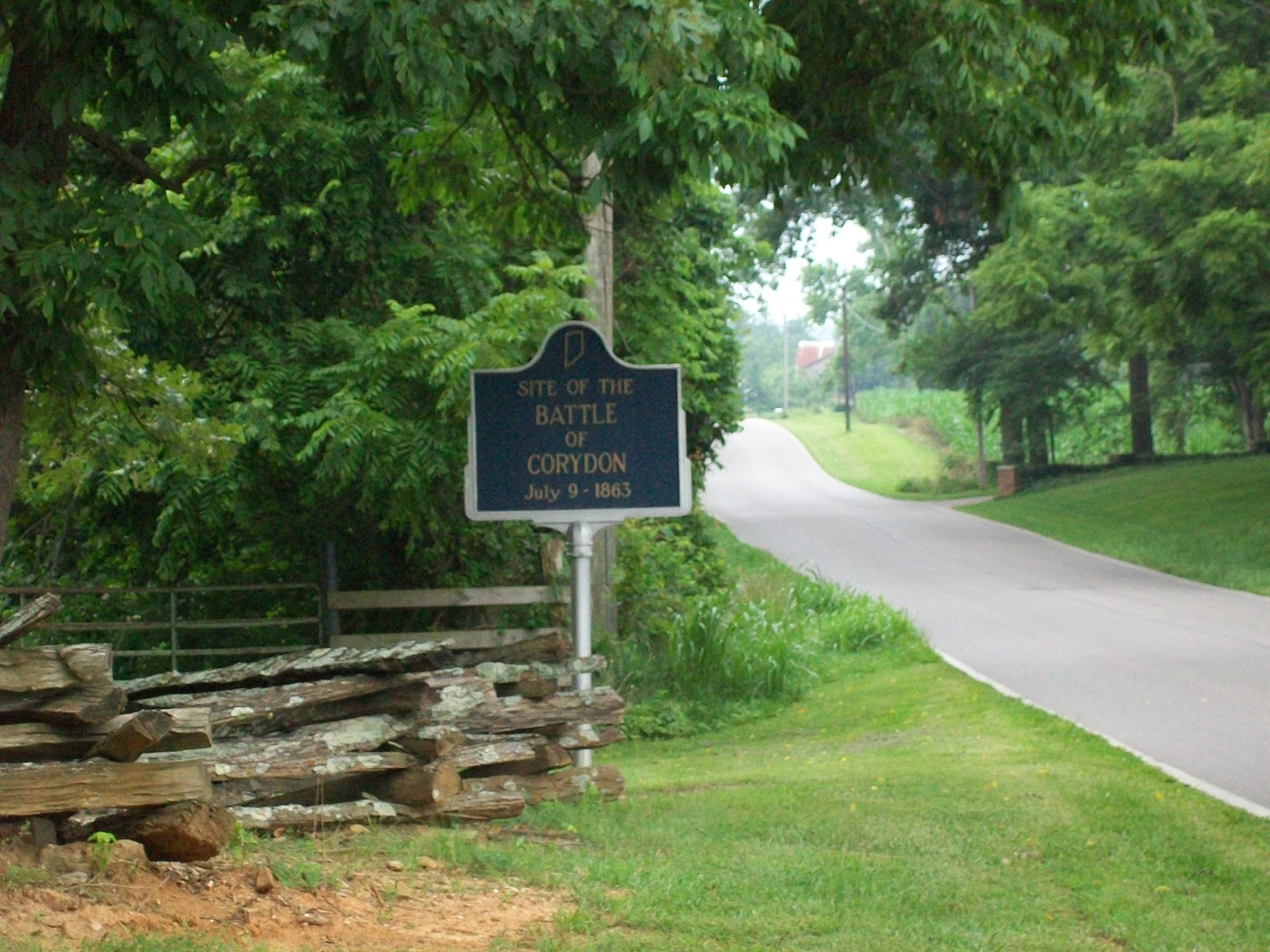
Site of the battle along the old Mauckport Road

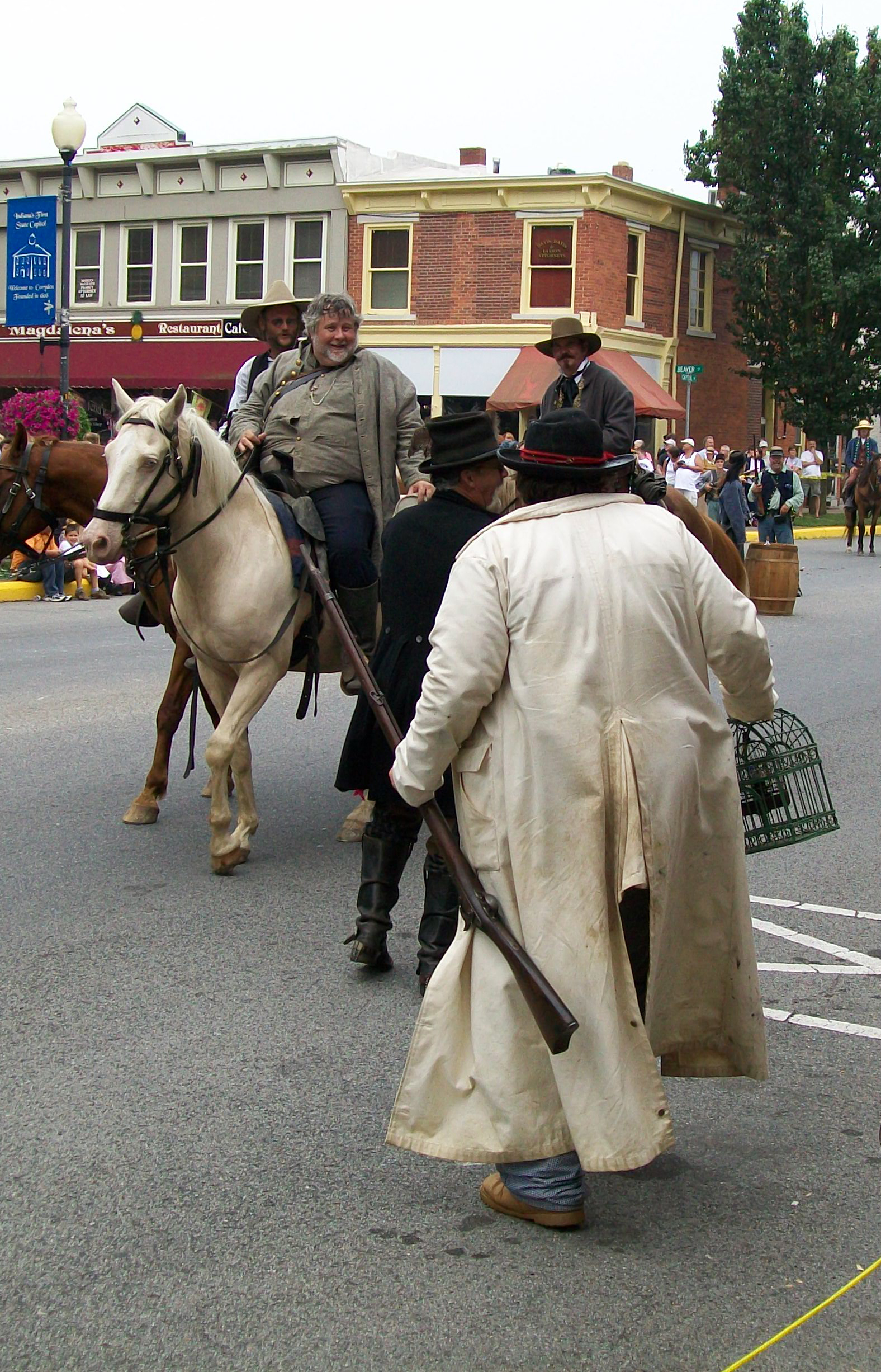
Looting of Corydon following the battle

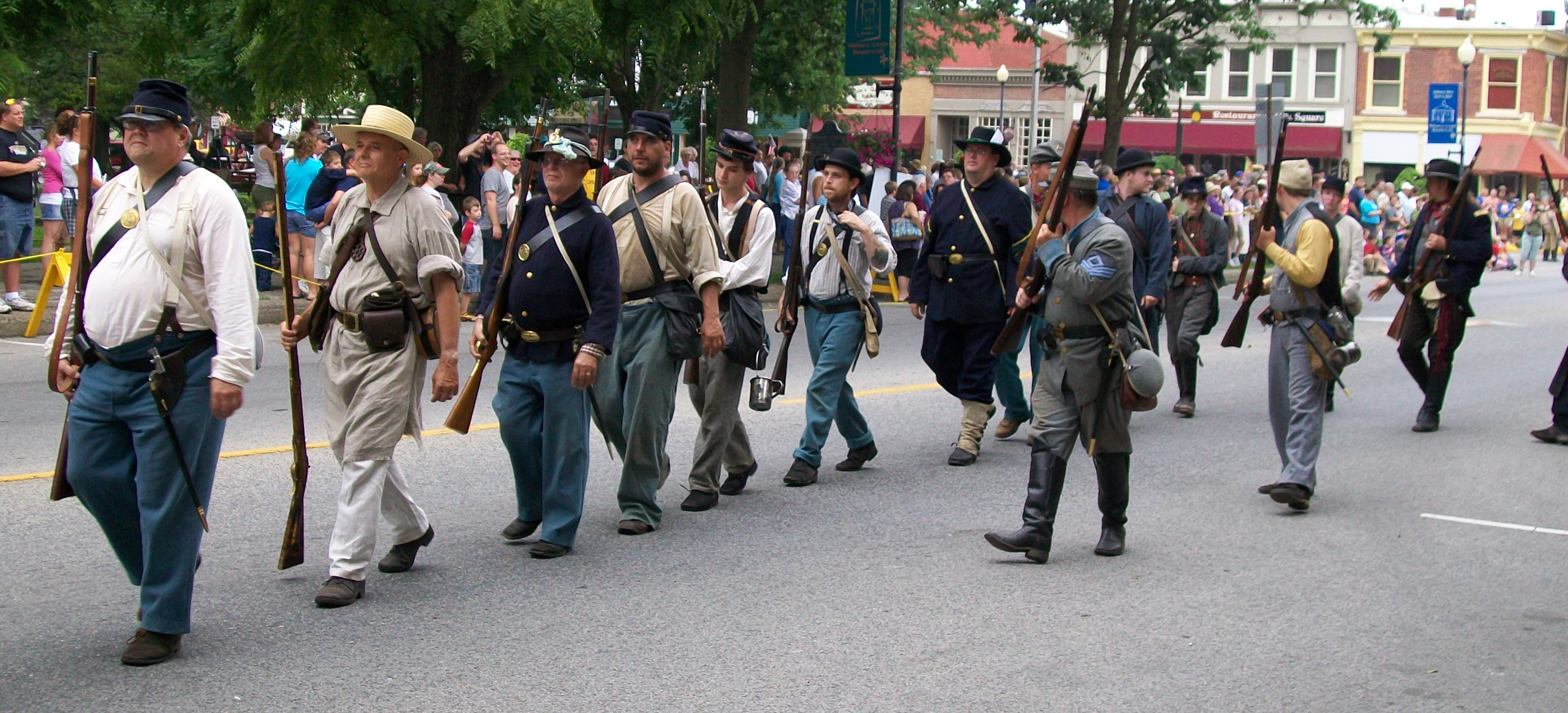
Captured soldiers are marched off to be paroled

== See also ==
- Corydon Battle Site
- Indiana in the American Civil War
- List of battles fought in Indiana
- List of American Civil War battles

== Notes ==
  - The Battle of Brandenburg Crossing is also sometimes called the Battle of Brandenburg Station
