= List of battles fought in Indiana =

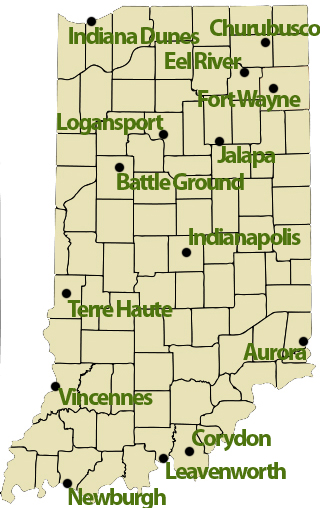
Map showing the location of the battles

This is an incomplete list of all military confrontations that have occurred within the boundaries of the modern U.S. State of Indiana since European contact. The French first entered Indiana c. 1670. The region was part of New France from 1679–1763, ruled by Great Britain from 1763–1783, and part of the United States of America 1783–present.

There have been several wars that have directly affected the region, including Beaver Wars (c 1590–1701), Queen Anne's War (1702–1713), King George's War (1744–1748), French and Indian War (1754–1763), American Revolutionary War (1775–1783), Northwest Indian War (1785–1795), Tecumseh's War (1811–1812), War of 1812 (1812–1814), and the American Civil War (1861–1865). Later wars, including World War I and World War II led to the death of tens of thousands of Hoosiers overseas, but the American Civil War was the last war in which an actual battle occurred within Indiana.

== Battles ==
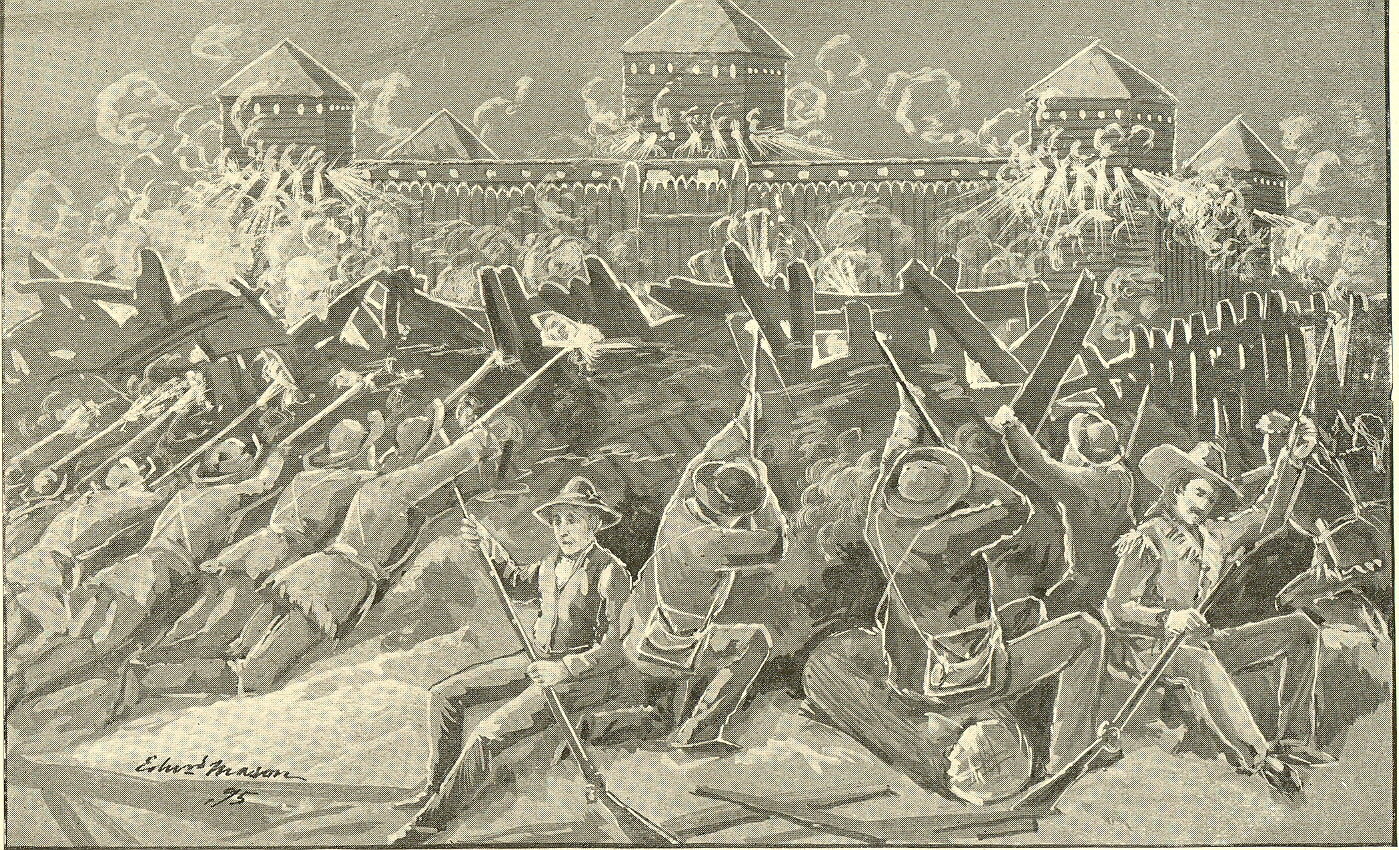
Siege of Fort Sackville February 20 – 25, 1779.

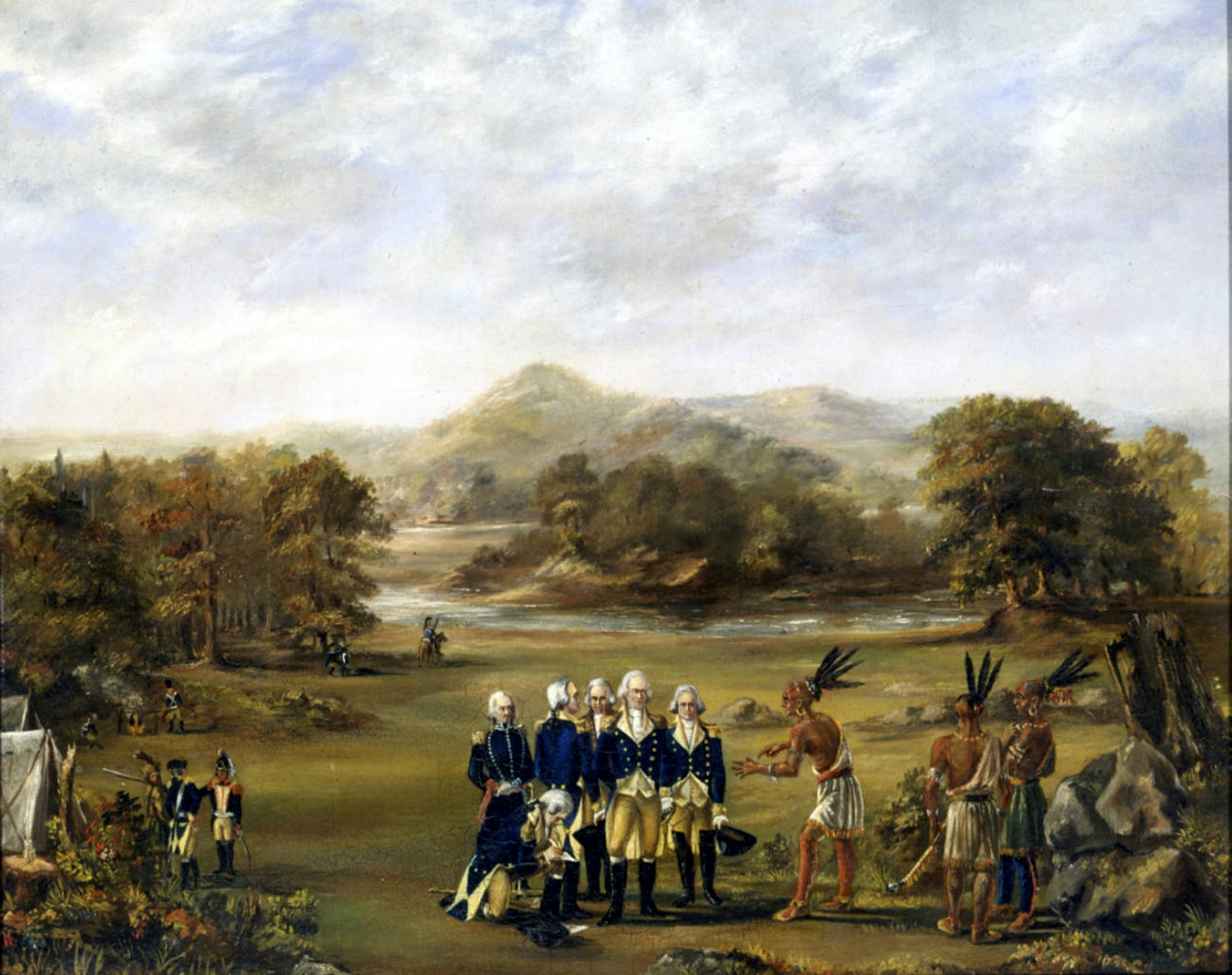
Signing of the Treaty of Greenville, August 3, 1795.

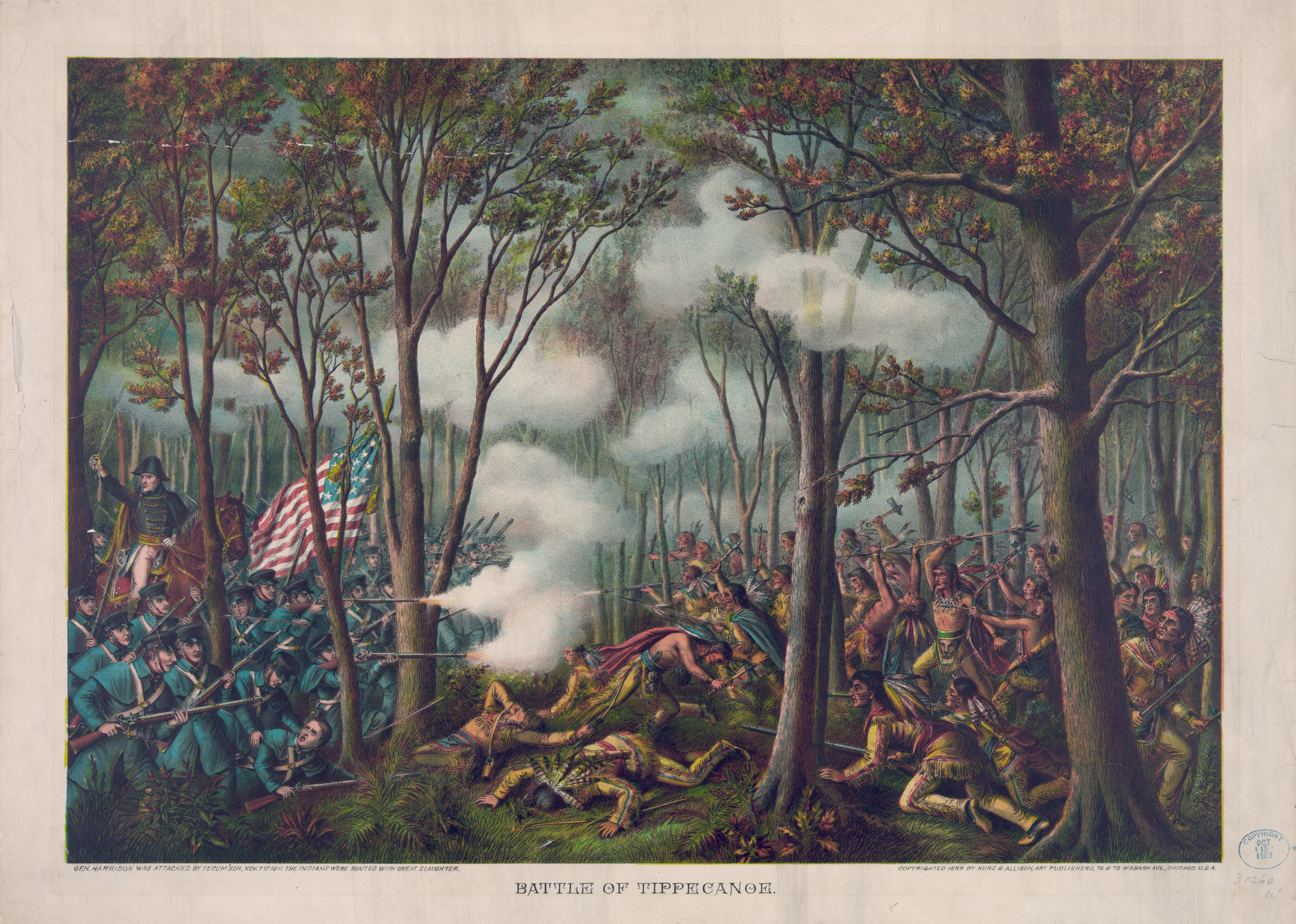
Battle of Tippecanoe, November 7, 1811

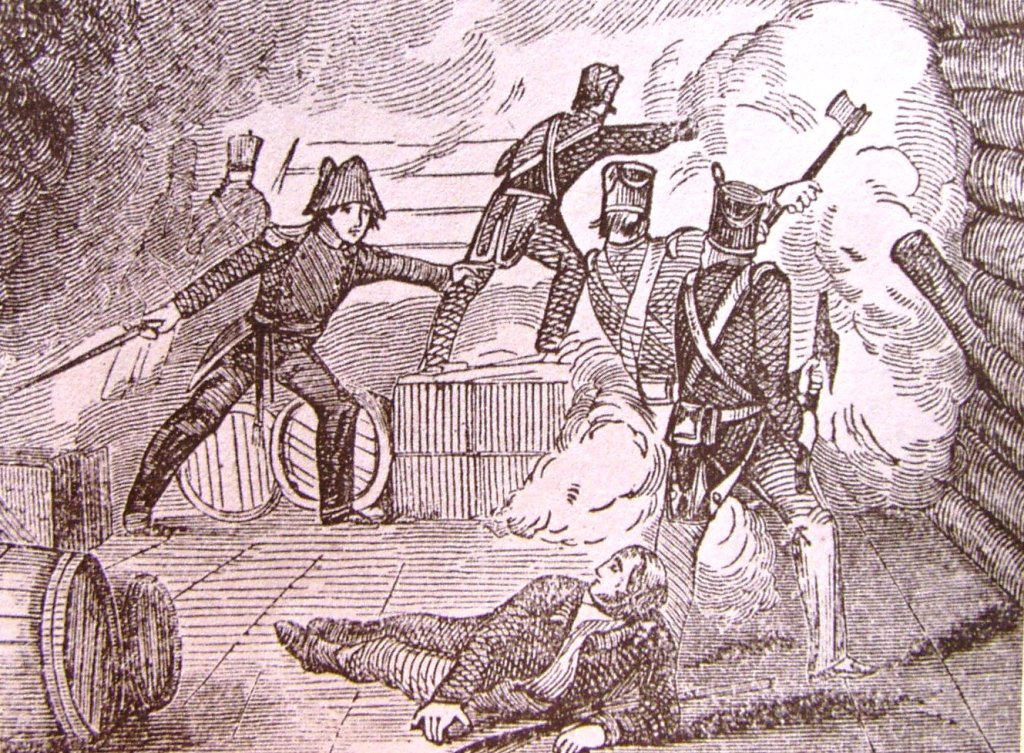
Siege of Fort Harrison, September 4, 1812.

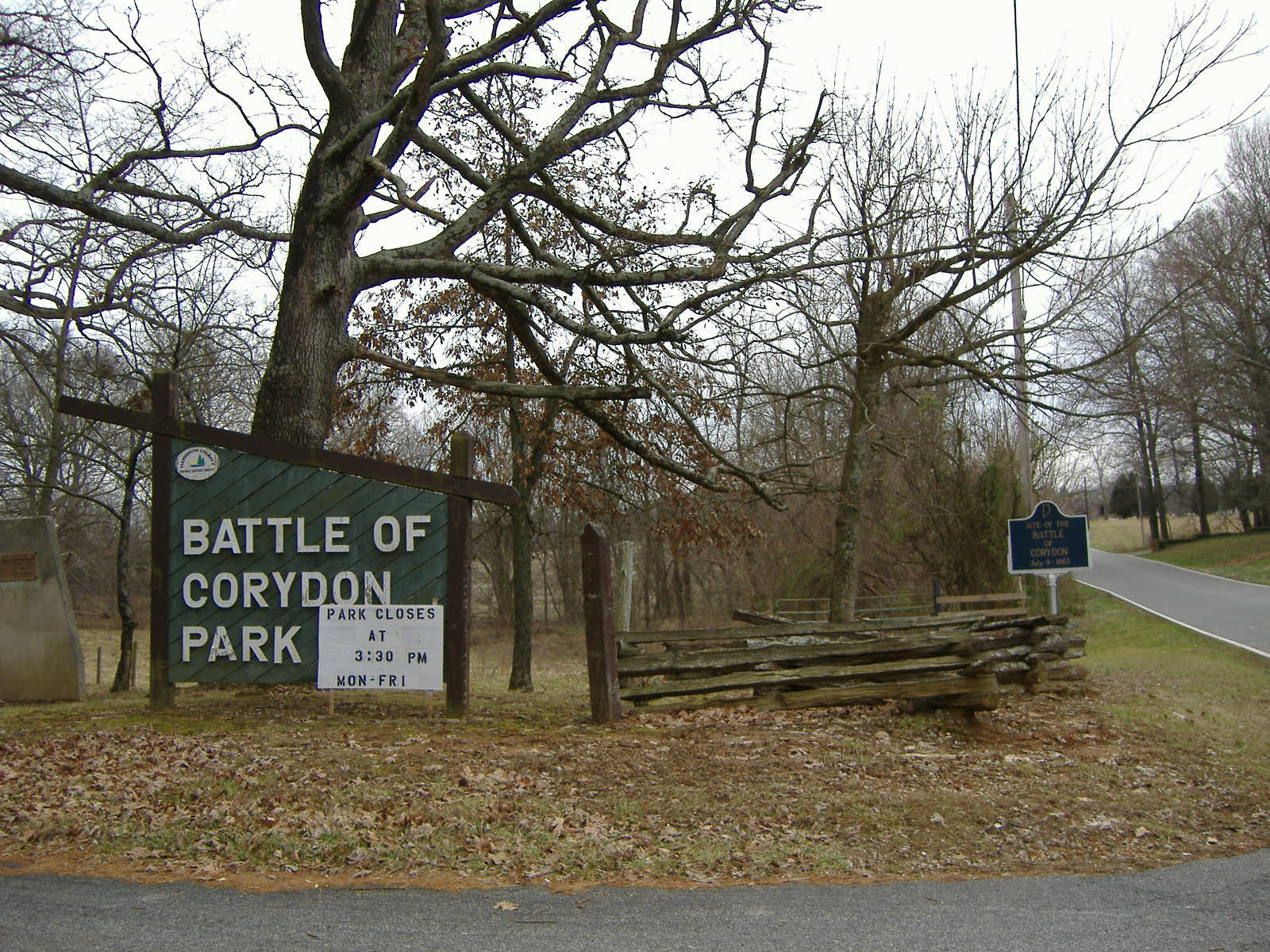
Battle of Corydon, July 9, 1863

Name	Date	Location	War	Campaign	Dead	Belligerents
Counter attack on Iroquois	1684	near modern South Bend	Beaver Wars		100+	Miami & allies vs Iroquois
Destruction of Fort Miami	1747	Fort Miami	King George's War			Huron vs. France
Attack on Fort Miami	1752	Fort Miami	French and Indian War		2	British-allied Indians vs. France
Capture of Fort Miami	May 27, 1763	Fort Miami	Pontiac's Rebellion		10	Great Britain vs. American Indians
Capture of Fort Ouiatenon	June 1, 1763	modern Lafayette	Pontiac's Rebellion		0	Great Britain vs. American Indians
Siege of Fort Sackville	February 20–25, 1779	Vincennes	American Revolutionary War	Illinois campaign	4	United States vs. Great Britain
Battle of the White River Forks	1779	Lechauwitank			unknown - village destroyed	Vincennes Militia vs Delaware village
Petit fort	5 December 1780	Indiana Dunes	American Revolutionary War		4	United States vs. Kingdom of Great Britain and American Indians
de LaBalme Massacre	November 5, 1780	Near the Eel River in Whitley County	American Revolutionary War		25+	United States vs. American Indians
Lochry's Defeat	August 24, 1781	Near Aurora	American Revolutionary War	Illinois campaign	37	United States vs. American Indians
Battle of the Embarras River	1786	Piankeshaw Village, Knox County			7	Vincennes militia vs. Piankeshaw
Hardin's Defeat	October 19, 1790	North of Fort Miami	Northwest Indian War	Harmar Expedition	22+	United States vs. Western Indian Confederacy
Harmar's Defeat	October 21, 1790	Fort Miami	Northwest Indian War	Harmar Expedition	249+	United States vs. Western Indian Confederacy
Battle of Big Pine Creek	1791	Big Pine Creek	Northwest Indian War			United States vs. Kickapoo
Blackberry Campaign	May 1791	Ouiatenon	Northwest Indian War		38	United States vs. Western Indian Confederacy
Battle of Kenapacomaqua	August 7, 1791	Near Logansport	Northwest Indian War		11	United States vs. Western Indian Confederacy
Battle of Tippecanoe	November 7, 1811	Near Battle Ground	Tecumseh's War (Note: Later merged with War of 1812)		223+	United States vs. Tecumseh's confederacy
Pigeon Roost Massacre	September 3, 1812	Underwood	War of 1812		19	Shawnee vs. white settlers
Siege of Fort Harrison	September 4–5, 1812	Terre Haute	War of 1812		3+	United States vs. Tecumseh's confederacy
Siege of Fort Wayne	September 5–12, 1812	Fort Wayne	War of 1812	Detroit Frontier	unknown	United States vs. Great Britain
Battle at Eel River	September 19, 1812	Near Churubusco	War of 1812	Detroit Frontier	25+	United States vs. Tecumseh's confederacy
Spur's Defeat	November 22, 1812	Wildcat Creek, near Lafayette	War of 1812		18	Shawnee vs. United States
Battle of the Mississinewa	December 17–18, 1812	Near Jalapa	War of 1812	Detroit Frontier	102+	United States vs. Tecumseh's confederacy
Battle of Tipton's Island	April 1813	White River	War of 1812	Detroit Frontier	7	Indiana Rangers vs. Kickapoo
Attack at Fort Wayne	July 7, 1813	Fort Wayne	War of 1812	Detroit Frontier	3	United States vs. Native Americans
Newburgh Raid	July 16, 1862	Newburgh	American Civil War		0	Confederate States of America vs. United States
Hines' Raid	June 18, 1863	Orange & Crawford counties (Note: Three men died in a skirmish near Leavenworth)	American Civil War	Morgan's Raid	3	Confederate States of America vs. United States and Indiana Legion
Battle of Brandenburg Crossing	July 7, 1863	East of Mauckport	American Civil War	Morgan's Raid	2	Confederate States of America vs. Indiana Legion
Battle of Corydon	July 9, 1863	Corydon	American Civil War	Morgan's Raid	15	Confederate States of America vs. Indiana Legion

== See also ==
- History of Indiana
- Indiana in the American Civil War
