= Newburgh Raid =

Part of the American Civil War

Coordinates: 37°56′48″N 87°24′13″W

- Part of the American Civil War
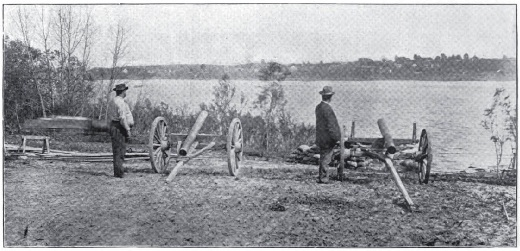
- Fake cannons found after the Newburgh Raid
Date	July 18, 1862
Location	Newburgh, Indiana
Result	Confederate victory

Belligerents
United States (Union)	Confederate States

Commanders and leaders
Union Bethell	Adam Rankin Johnson

Units involved
Indiana Legion	Confederate partisan rangers

The Newburgh Raid was a successful raid by Confederate partisans on Newburgh, Indiana, on July 18, 1862, making it the first town in a northern state to be captured during the American Civil War. Confederate colonel Adam Rankin Johnson led the raid by using a force of only about 35 men he had recruited from nearby Henderson, Kentucky. They confiscated supplies and ammunition without a shot being fired by tricking Newburgh's defenders into thinking the town was surrounded by cannons. In reality, the so-called cannons were an assemblage of a stove pipe, a charred log, and wagon wheels, forever giving the Confederate commander the nickname of Adam "Stovepipe" Johnson.

The raid convinced the federal government to supply Indiana with a permanent force of regular Union Army soldiers to counter future raids and proved to be a significant boost for Union recruiting in Indiana.

== Background ==
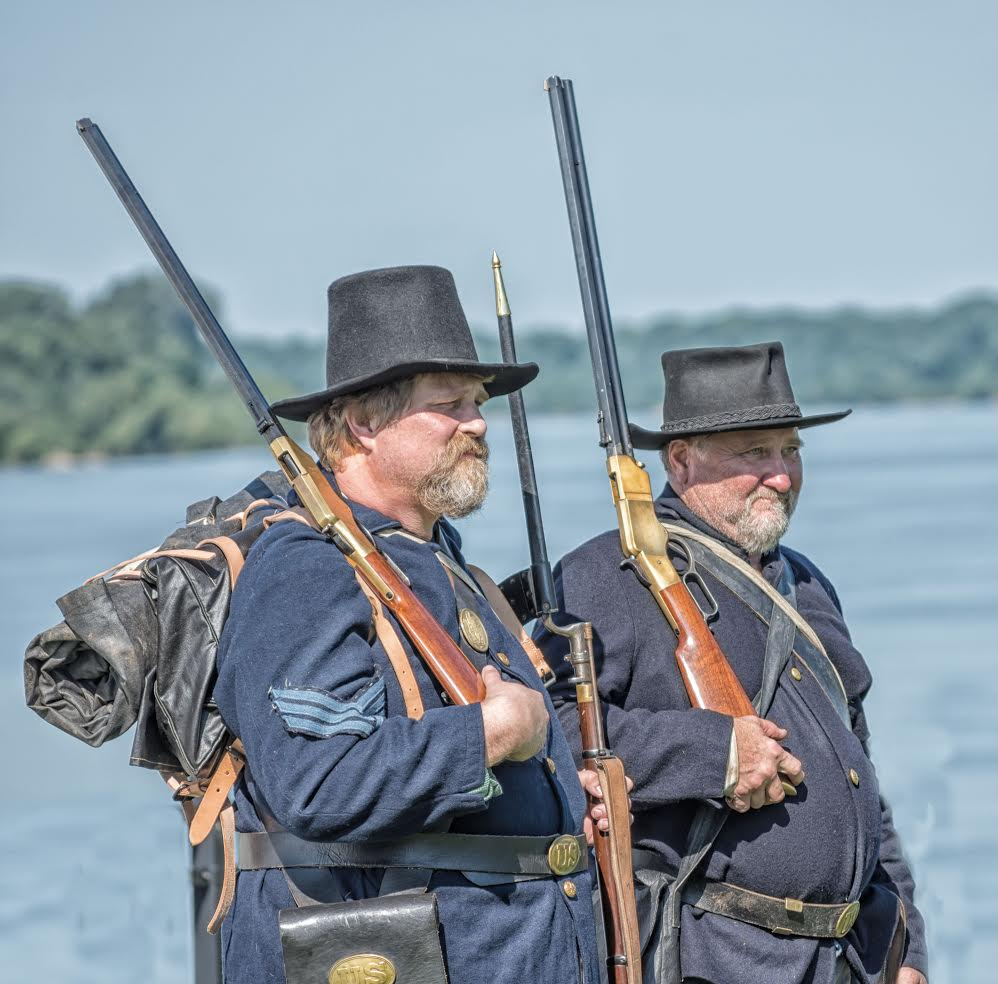
Civil War re-enactors portray the Newburgh Raid in July 2016

Using the language of the 1862 Confederate Partisan Ranger Act, Johnson pictured himself in a book he wrote later in life as part of a military force operating in an irregular manner under the authority of such superiors as General Nathan Bedford Forrest and General John C. Breckinridge. Yet at the time of the raid, Johnson's own account suggests he had no formal appointment as an officer, wore no uniform, and commanded a hastily assembled body of civilians—more guerrillas than soldiers. Union authorities certainly viewed him as little or nothing more than a brigand, and later rejected the authority of the paroles he had issued to his eighty prisoners.

However, Johnson was not without some experience and authority. Prior to the raid he served as a scout for Gen. Forrest, just missing the Battle of Shiloh in April 1862, in south-central Tennessee, rejoining Forrest at the Confederate base of operations in Corinth, Mississippi. Johnson was ordered by Forrest to go to Henderson, Kentucky, to give a secret message to Mr. D. R. Burbank, a former employer of Johnson's. Just before launching the raid, Johnson's partisans camped at the Soaper Farm in Henderson. With thirty-five men by Johnson's later count (other counts say 32), formed by combining three-man guards for Breckinridge with recruits from Kentucky, Johnson formed a group of partisan rangers that would engage in guerrilla warfare.

== Raid ==
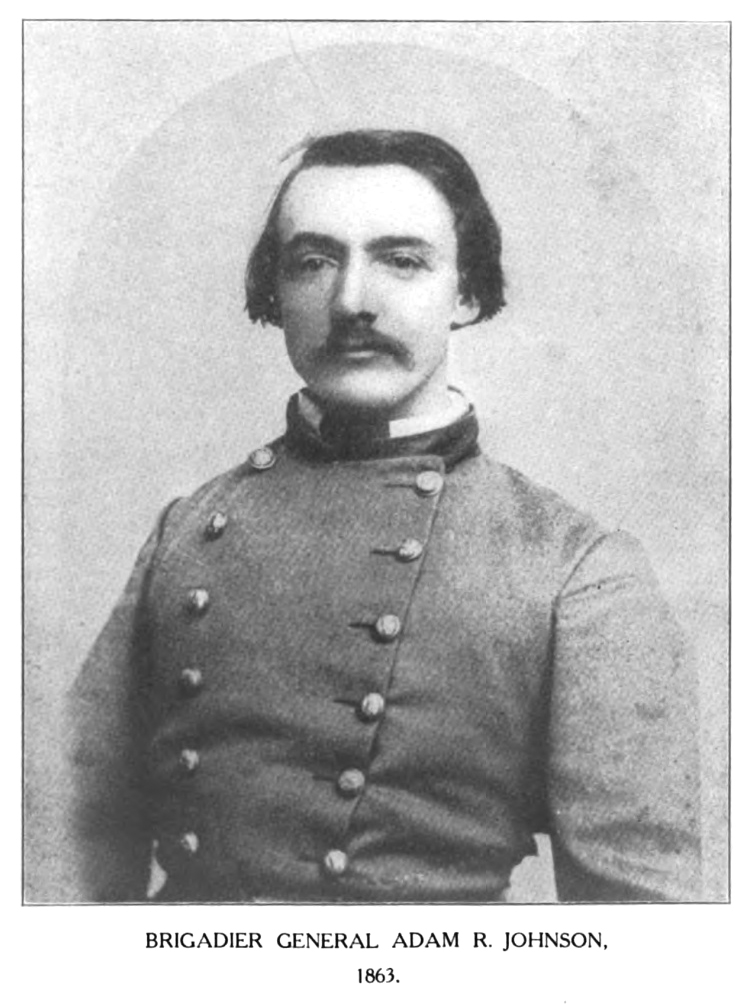
Adam Rankin Johnson in 1863

Johnson and his men crossed the Ohio River on 18 July 1862. Johnson and two subordinates, Felix Akin and Frank A. Owen, shared one boat and the rest of the force crossed via a flatboat. Prior to crossing, Johnson strategically placed two "Quaker Guns", actually made of stovepipes, charred logs, and the axles and wheels from a broken wagon, on hills that had a view of Newburgh, and vice versa. Johnson was unable to find enough firearms for all of his force, but was able to acquire enough horses for each man to receive a mount. Johnson allowed each of his men to decline to join him on the raid, but to a man they all wanted to accompany him.

In Newburgh the local Indiana Legion was commanded by Union Bethell, who had previously enjoyed limited success in raising and training a local company of that state militia. Accordingly, he stored the weapons provided for them in his own unguarded riverfront warehouse, a tobacco warehouse that also held 75 loose sabers and 130 pistol/holster sets. The only defenders available for Newburgh were eighty soldiers convalescing at a makeshift hospital that was the Exchange Hotel. This hospital was itself a tempting prize for Johnson because it had medical supplies, commissary items, and arms for 200 soldiers that were meant for two future companies of the Indiana Legion; all of which Johnson's forces needed. When Johnson opened the door to the hotel, he was immediately aimed at by Union rifles, but quickly informed the Union soldiers that they were surrounded and had no hope for success.

When the raiders struck, Bethell was lunching and arrived on the scene in civilian attire. When he arrived at the hotel he refrained from more than verbal protests after Johnson pointed out two cannons placed across the river — cannons that were actually the fake dummies made from a blackened log and the piece of stovepipe that gave Johnson his subsequent nickname. Johnson said to Bethel he would "shell this town to the ground" if resistance was made.

Fifteen miles away in Evansville, Indiana, five companies of the Indiana Legion were being raised, but would not be available to defend Newburgh until after the Confederates withdrew. Through chance rather than Confederate action, the telegraph line from Newburgh to Evansville was not in operation. Word of Johnson's incursion thus took extra hours to reach state and federal military authorities. After securing the items he desired, Johnson paroled the captured Union officers and soldiers, and returned to the Kentucky soil. Newburgh had become the first town in a Northern state to be captured.

== Aftermath and consequences ==
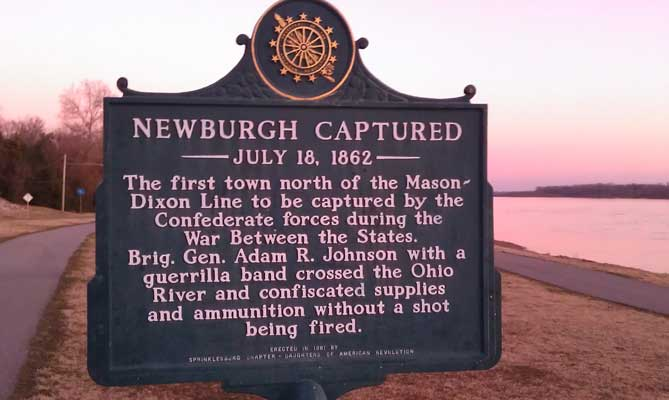
Historical marker by the Ohio River near where the Newburgh Raid occurred

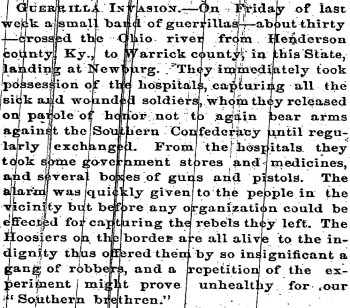
Report of the raid in the Evansville Weekly Gazette on 26 July 1862

When the nearby companies of Union soldiers finally learned of the raid, it set in motion several frantic days of Union responses. Lieutenant Colonel John Watson Foster, on leave from the 25th Indiana Infantry Regiment, took command in Evansville. He called for volunteers, including local convalescent Union soldiers, assembled a small riverboat flotilla, sailed up the Ohio River to the mouth of the Green River and engaged in skirmishing with a small number of Confederate guerrillas.

Finding few defenders, Foster then proceeded to Newburgh. Half a dozen local residents who were perceived as friendly to the rebels were arrested. One, Andrew Huston, was later tried and acquitted by a federal court jury in Indianapolis on charges of treason and assisting the rebels. Two other Newburgh residents who had assisted the raiders were slain by members of an angry local crowd before order was restored. An additional six residents were imprisoned in Indianapolis and four others left the town for good.

The total surprise and the bloodless success of the raid was a shock to many Hoosier leaders and Governor Oliver P. Morton soon took a visible hand. First in Indianapolis and then in Evansville, he issued repeated calls for volunteers and urged vigorous military responses. Within three days, state and federal military officers sent approximately a thousand regulars and volunteers to the scene, occupied Henderson, Kentucky, and sent probes into that city's countryside. One of the probes, led by Captain Bethell, recovered a portion of the stolen arms at a nearby farm.

The occupation of Henderson proved to be a long term consequence of the raid; Newburgh would not again be threatened. Occurring during a call for large numbers of new volunteers, the raid also proved to be a significant boost for Union recruiting in Indiana. The July volunteers were formed into a short-lived thirty day unit, the 76th Indiana Infantry Regiment. Volunteers of longer service would become parts of the 65th Indiana Infantry Regiment and 78th Indiana Infantry Regiment. Several thousand more Indiana volunteers joined the army in the following days and weeks. Disappointed with the performance of his militia, Morton returned to Indianapolis and devoted much time to improving militia equipment and training, and extending the telegraph network along the exposed Ohio River.

The Newburgh Raid also enabled Johnson to raise and arm a number of youthful recruits for what became his 10th Kentucky cavalry (CSA). After the raid, Braxton Bragg had Johnson promoted to colonel. Johnson would forever be nicknamed "Stovepipe" for his success in this raid. He returned to Indiana a year later as a brigade commander in Morgan's Raid in 1863.

Historian and former Union officer Edmund L. Starling said of the raid: "[Adam] Johnson performed perhaps the most reckless, and yet most successful, military masterstroke achieved by any commander of high or low authority, in either army during the war." Johnson recounted the events many times, and eventually published the account in his memoir, Partisan Rangers of the Confederacy. Filled with enthusiasm, southern chivalry, and name-dropping — although often sparse on corroboration — his memoir has assured that many commentators place the Newburgh raid in the context of Confederate movements in Kentucky in the summer of 1862.

The Newburgh Museum began staging a re-enactment of the raid in 2016. In the past, the event was occasionally commemorated by the reenactors Cobb's Key Battery at Henderson's Sunset Park.

== See also ==
- Hines' Raid
- Morgan's Raid
- List of battles fought in Indiana
