= Corydon Battle Site =

- U.S. National Register of Historic Places
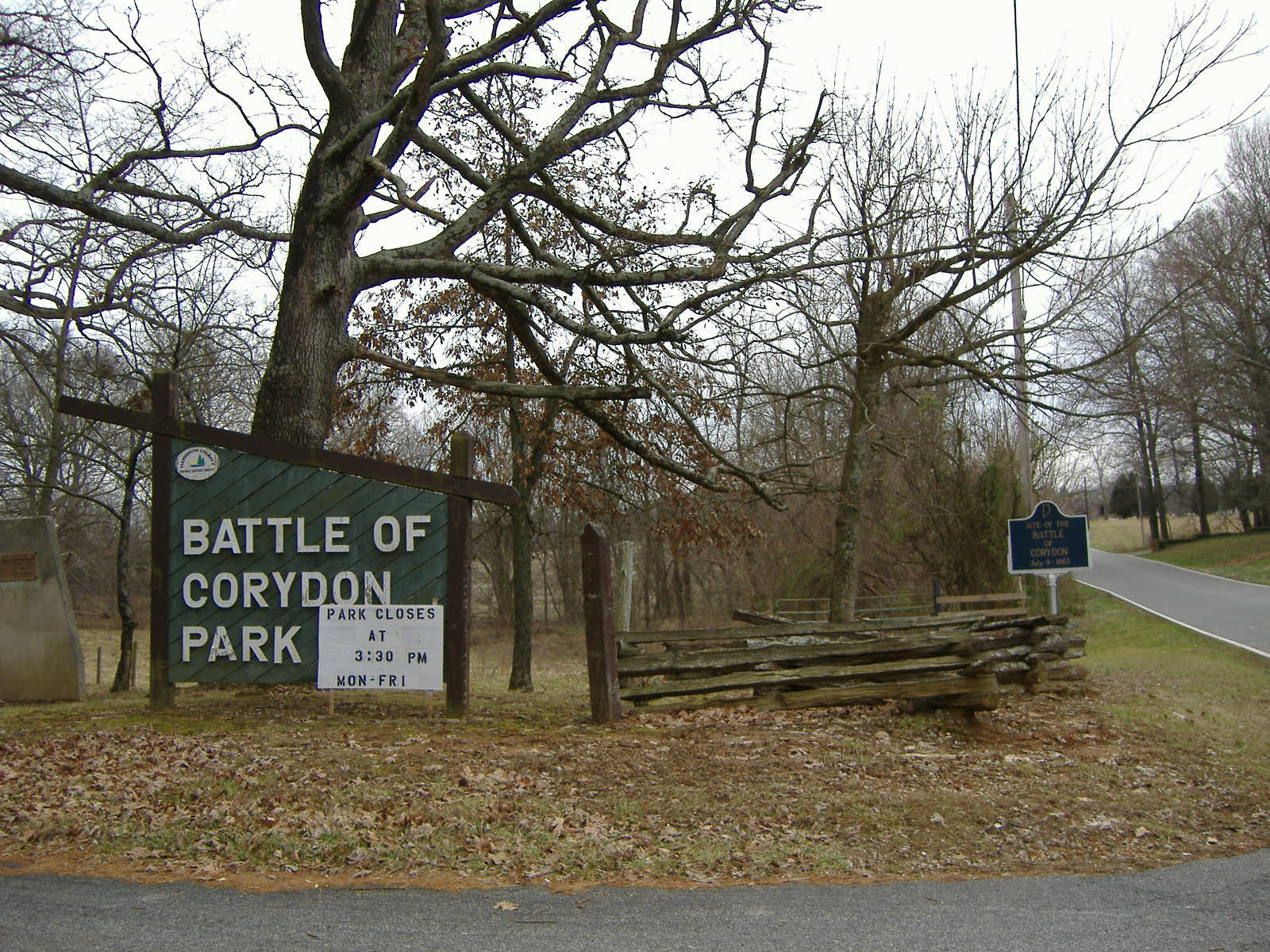

- Location within Harrison County, Indiana Location within Indiana Location within the United States
- Location: South of Corydon on State Road 135, Harrison Township, Harrison County, Indiana
- Coordinates: 38°11′58.87″N 86°07′46.06″W
- Area: 5 acres (2.0 ha)
- Built: 1863
- NRHP reference No.: 79000017
- Added to NRHP: July 9, 1979

The Corydon Battle Site is a protected park area located in Harrison Township, Harrison County, Indiana. The site preserves the battlefield where a portion of the Battle of Corydon occurred on July 9, 1863. It is part of the Harrison County Parks Department and is officially known as the Battle of Corydon Memorial Park. It contains the Corydon Civil War Museum.

The site was added to the National Register of Historic Places on July 9, 1979.

== Gallery ==
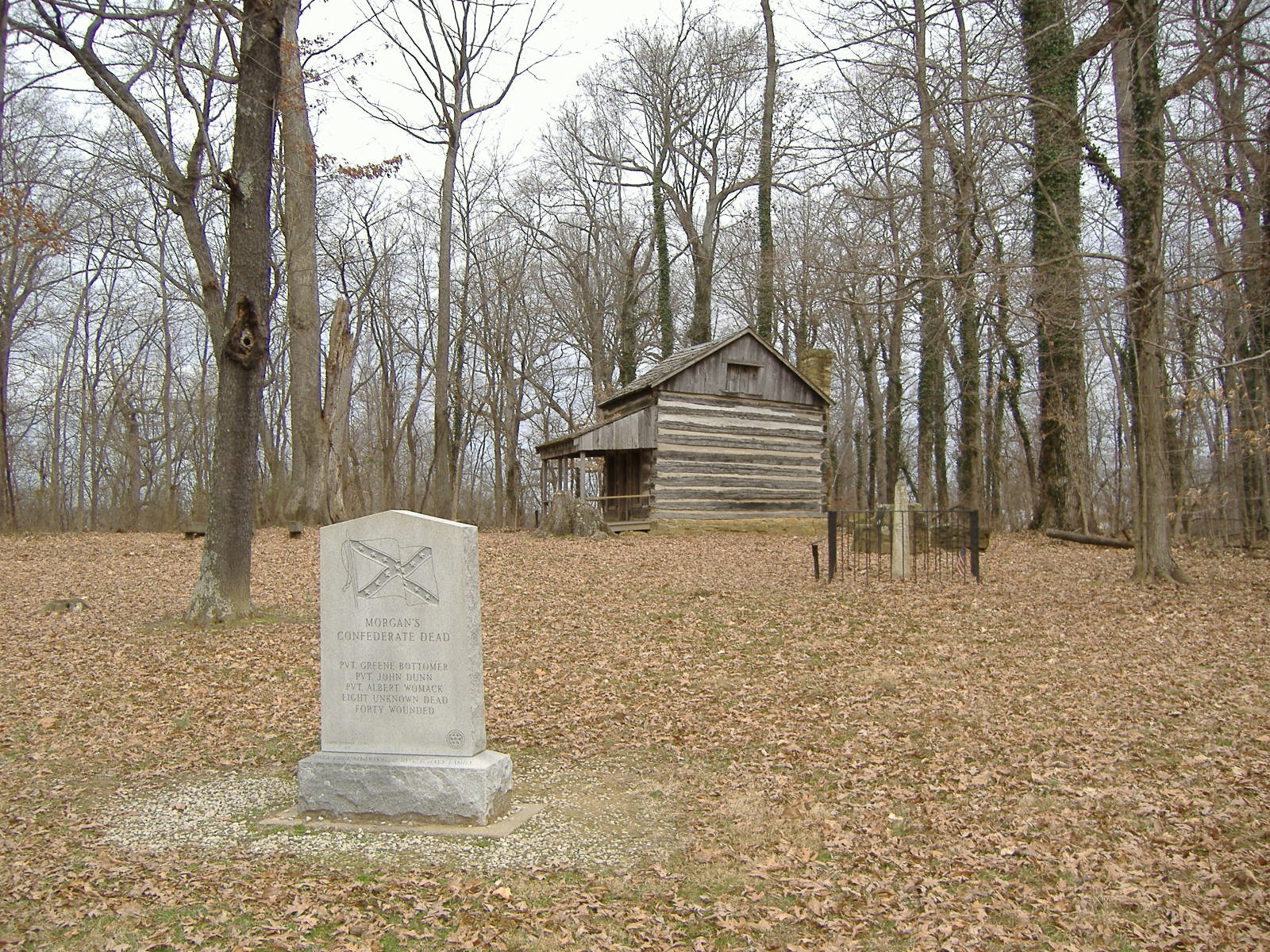
Cabin that was on the flank of the battle, moved to current location. The marker denotes the number of dead on both sides

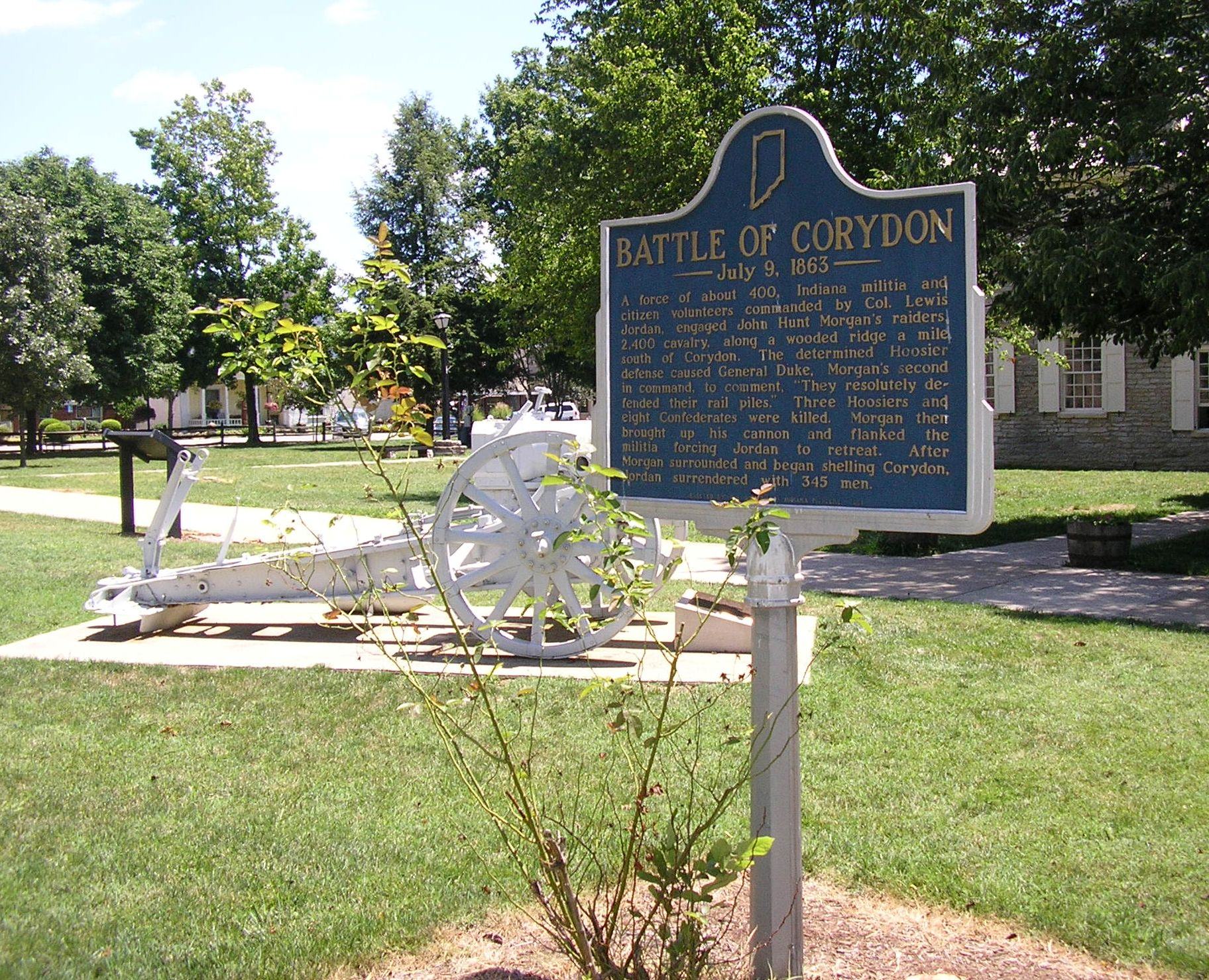
Historic Marker in downtown Corydon
