= Battle of Kenapacomaqua =

1791 battle of the Northwest Indian War

- Part of the Northwest Indian War
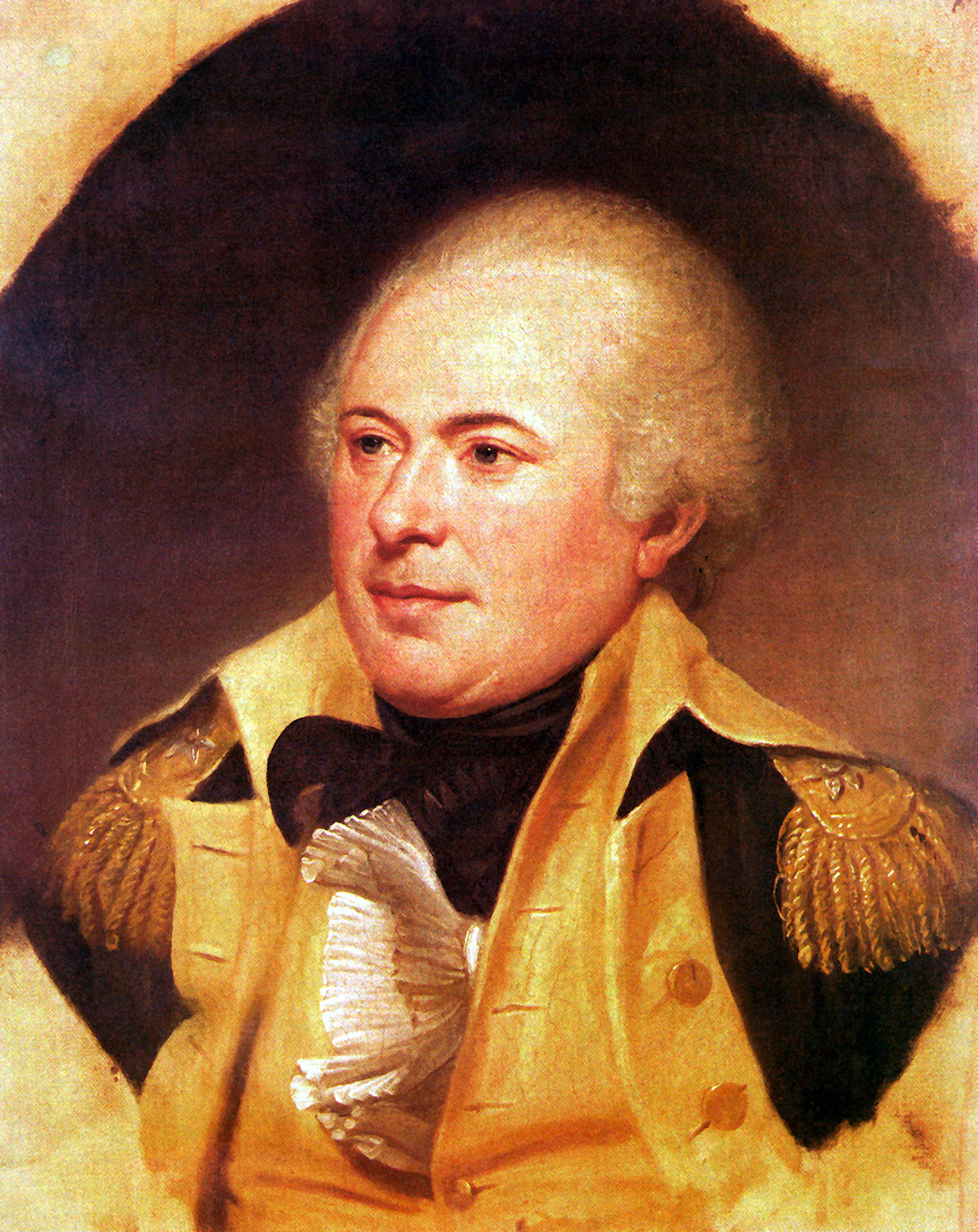
- A portrait of James Wilkinson
Date	August 7, 1791
Location	Cass County, Indiana
Result	American victory

Belligerents
United States	Wea

Commanders and leaders
James Wilkinson	Unknown

Strength
525	8 (in village – others on patrol in forest areas)

Casualties and losses
2 killed 1 wounded	9 killed 34 captured

The Battle of Kenapacomaqua, also called the Battle of Old Town, was a raid in 1791 by United States forces under the command of Lieutenant Colonel (later Brigadier General) James Wilkinson on the Miami (Wea) town of Kenapacomaqua on the Eel River, approximately six miles upstream from present-day Logansport, Indiana.

== Background ==
In 1791, Northwest Territory Governor Arthur St. Clair readied an Army to attack Kekionga in response to Harmar's Defeat in 1790. He intended to dispatch a separate force simultaneously to distract the defending Native American coalition. Delays in preparations caused St. Clair to initiate Wilkinson's raid prior to the main body's advance, however. Lieutenant Colonel Wilkinson had served under Brigadier General Charles Scott during the Blackberry Campaign of Spring 1791, in which mounted Kentucky militia raided Native American villages along the Wabash River and its tributaries. That campaign was considered a great success, and many called for a second raid before the end of Summer. Wilkinson's force of 523 Kentucky militia departed Fort Washington on 1 August 1791. They covered about 70 miles in two and a half days, and arrived at Kenapacomaqua on 7 August 1791.

== Battle ==
Wilkinson immediately crossed the Eel River and attacked. Unknown to Wilkinson, the village was lightly defended. Alexander McKee had called a Grand Council of the Western Confederacy, and other leaders were travelling to Quebec for a meeting with Guy Carleton, 1st Baron Dorchester and Joseph Brant. The remaining residents were suffering from a severe flu-like illness, which – according to one British observer – caused them to bury two or three people each day. Thirty-four Miami were taken prisoner, mostly women and children. One of the captives was a daughter of Miami war chief Little Turtle. In addition, one U.S. captive was found at Kenapacomaqua and released. According to that captive, only eight warriors had remained at the village. Sixty warriors were patrolling the Wabash River, while others were at Vincennes purchasing ammunition or gathering food in the forests.

Two Kentuckians were killed and another wounded. Nine Miami died in the encounter. By Wilkinson's own account, the Miami dead included only six warriors. Two of the dead were women, and one was a child. Wilkinson's forces cut down the corn crops and burned the village houses. The militia made camp for the night, but decided not to proceed further due to fear of retaliation. Wilkinson followed the same route to Kentucky used by General Scott months earlier, stopping at Ouiatenon to destroy the crops newly planted since the June raid.

== Aftermath ==
The Western Confederacy was enraged by the attack and sent calls to war. Within weeks, news arrived that the United States had begun a larger advance north from Fort Washington. Observers at Fort Detroit noted a constant stream of Native Americans going to war.

Wilkinson exaggerated the report of his raid, claiming to have destroyed "the chief town" of the Wea. Although Wilkinson's success is now credited to circumstances which left Kenapacomaqua lightly defended, General St. Clair and President George Washington were both pleased with Wilkinson's raid. Secretary of War Henry Knox considered both the Blackberry Campaign and the Battle of Kenapacomaqua a success, writing "The consternation arising from the demonstration of their being within our reach must all tend to the great object, the establishment of peace." As a reward, Wilkinson was given command of the Second United States Regiment during the main campaign that October.

Ironically, Governor Guy Carleton, 1st Baron Dorchester urged peace that same August at his conference, held at the Chateau St. Louis in Quebec. The American Indian council departed with terms of peace to present to the United States. When the council arrived at Fort Detroit, however, they received news of Wilkinson's raid and St. Clair's advance. The entire council immediately departed to defend Kekionga, which ended on 4 November 1791 with St. Clair's Defeat, one of the worst defeats in U.S. Army history. The Northwest Indian War would continue another four years.

== See also ==
- List of battles fought in Indiana
