= 76th Indiana Infantry Regiment =

Infantry regiment of the Union Army during the American Civil War

76th Regiment Indiana Infantry
- Active: July 20, 1862, to August 20, 1862
- Country: United States
- Allegiance: Union
- Branch: Infantry

The 76th Regiment Indiana Infantry was an infantry regiment that served in the Union Army during the American Civil War.

== Service ==
The 76th Indiana Infantry was organized at Indianapolis, Indiana and mustered in for thirty days service on July 20, 1862, under the command of Colonel James Gavin, who was temporarily reassigned from his command with the 7th Indiana Infantry.

The regiment mustered out of service on August 20, 1862.

== Detailed service ==
Duty at Evansville, Indiana, and at Henderson, Kentucky, operating against guerrillas and protecting steamboats on the Ohio River until August 20.

== See also ==
- Newburgh Raid
- List of Indiana Civil War regiments
- Indiana in the Civil War
