= Stovepipe Johnson =

Confederate Brigadier General most known for Newburgh Raid

Adam Rankin Johnson
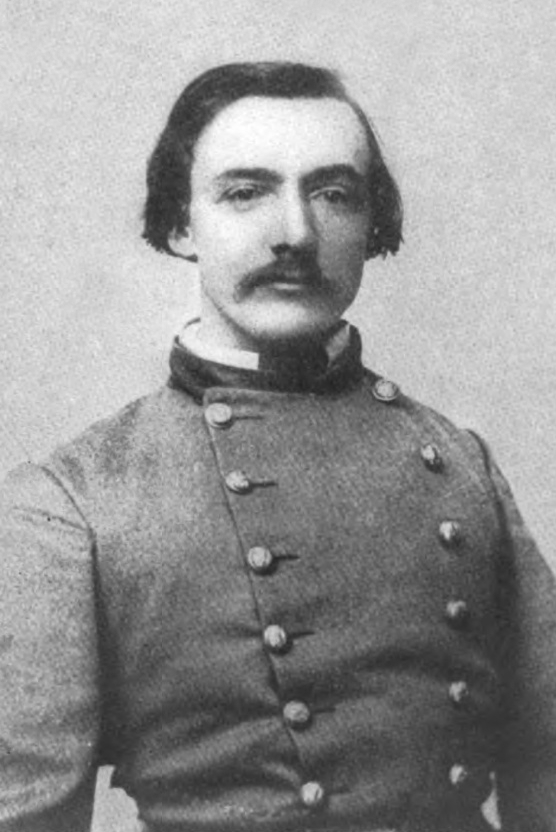
- Born: February 6, 1834; Henderson, Kentucky, United States
- Died: October 20, 1922 (aged 88); Burnet, Texas, United States
- Burial place: Texas State Cemetery; Austin, Texas
- Military career
- Allegiance: United States of America; Confederate States of America
- Branch: Confederate States Army
- Service years: 1861–1865
- Rank: Colonel; Brigadier General (appointment not confirmed)
- Nickname: "Stovepipe"
- Unit: 3rd Tennessee Cavalry (Forrest's)
- Commands: 10th Kentucky Partisan Rangers; Johnson's Cavalry Brigade
- Conflicts: American Civil War: Battle of Sacramento; Battle of Fort Donelson; Newburgh Raid; Morgan's Raid

Adam Rankin "Stovepipe" Johnson (February 6, 1834 – October 20, 1922) was an antebellum Western frontiersman and later an officer in the Confederate States Army during the American Civil War. Johnson obtained fame leading the Newburgh Raid using a force of only about 35 men. Johnson and his men confiscated supplies and ammunition without firing a shot by deceiving Newburgh's defenders into thinking Confederate cannons surrounded the town. In reality, the "cannons" were an assemblage of a stove pipe, a charred log, and wagon wheels, forever giving Johnson the nickname of Adam "Stovepipe" Johnson. Permanently blinded during an 1864 skirmish, in 1887, Johnson founded the town of Marble Falls, Texas, which became known as "the blind man's town."

== Early life ==
Johnson was born in Henderson, Kentucky, a son of Thomas J. and Juliet (Rankin) Johnson. Johnson was educated in the local schools and worked in a drugstore from 12 to 20. In 1854, he moved to Hamilton Valley in Burnet County, Texas, and worked as a surveyor on the West Texas frontier. He was a noted Indian fighter and provided supplies and animals for the Butterfield Overland Mail stations. On January 1, 1861, he married Josephine Eastland of Austin, with whom he had nine children.

== American Civil War ==
When the American Civil War began, Johnson returned to Kentucky. He joined Nathan B. Forrest's cavalry battalion as a scout, fighting at the Battle of Sacramento. Johnson escaped capture with Forrest after Fort Donelson, when the Confederate commanders decided to surrender their post to the Union besiegers. Johnson later received a promotion to colonel for his exploits with his 10th Kentucky Partisan Rangers, a regiment he raised that often operated deep behind U.S. Army lines in Kentucky. Johnson's men harassed Union supply lines and attacked isolated garrisons. In July 1862, in his Newburgh Raid, Johnson captured the town of Newburgh, Indiana, bluffing its sizable Union militia force into surrendering with only twelve of his men and a stovepipe mounted and a burnt black log on the running gears of an abandoned wagon to form a Quaker cannon. His capture of the first Northern city to fall to the Confederates made the news even in Europe, and Johnson's men thereafter nicknamed him "Stovepipe".

In 1863, Johnson assumed command of a brigade in the cavalry division of Brig. Gen. John Hunt Morgan. He reluctantly participated in Morgan's Raid, though he was only supposed to raid on the Kentucky side of the river. Following the Confederate disaster at the Battle of Buffington Island, Johnson led nearly 350 of his men across the rain-swollen Ohio River to safety. The remainder of Morgan's division was trapped on the Ohio side of the river and eventually forced to surrender.

Johnson was appointed brigadier general on September 6, 1864, to rank from June 1, 1864, though his appointment was never confirmed by the Confederate Congress. On August 21, 1864, he was blinded by an accidental shot from one of his men during a skirmish at Grubb's Crossroads, near Princeton, Kentucky. Abandoned because of his injuries, U.S. soldiers captured him, and Johnson became a prisoner of war in Fort Warren. Johnson was exchanged near the war's end and, despite his blindness, attempted to return to active duty before the Confederacy finally surrendered.

== Postbellum ==
Johnson returned to Texas after being exchanged and paroled in 1865. Although blind, he founded a town, established a company, and worked to harness the water power of the Colorado River. One of his grandsons was Rankin Johnson Sr., a former Major League pitcher for the Boston Red Sox and St. Louis Cardinals.

He died in Burnet, Texas in 1922 at the age of 88, and is interred at the Texas State Cemetery in Austin, Texas. He rests beside his wife Josephine and near his grandson, Judge George Christian Sr., and a great-grandson, George Christian Jr.

== See also ==
- List of American Civil War generals (Acting Confederate)
