= USS Elk (1863) =

Gunboat of the United States Navy

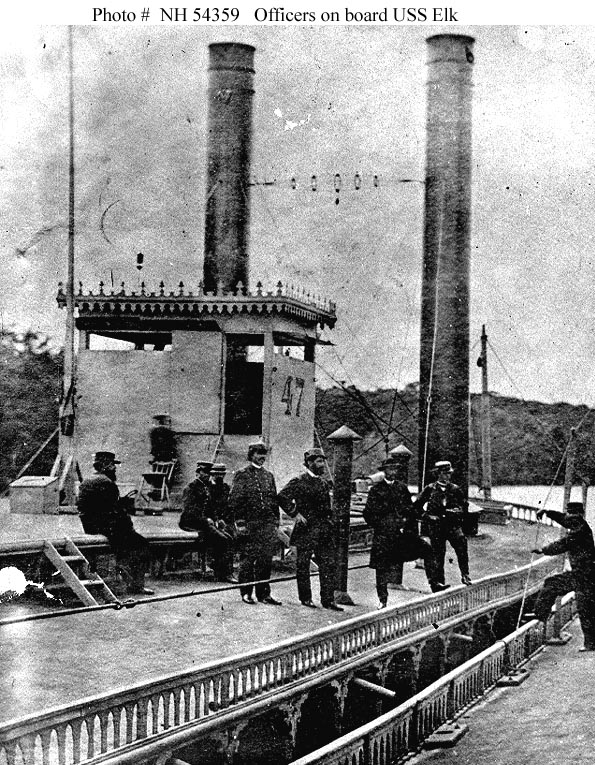

History

United States
- Acquired: 8 December 1863
- Commissioned: 6 May 1864
- Fate: sold, 24 August 1865

General characteristics
- Displacement: 162 tons
- Length: 156 ft (48 m)
- Beam: 29 ft (8.8 m)
- Depth of hold: 3 ft 10 in (1.17 m)
- Propulsion: steam engine; side wheel-propelled
- Complement: 65
- Armament: two 32-pounder guns; four 24-pounder smoothbore guns

USS Elk was a steamer, originally named Countess, which was acquired by the Union Navy during the American Civil War. She was used by the Union Navy as a convoy and patrol vessel on Confederate waterways.

== Service history ==
Countess, a side wheel steamer, was purchased by Admiral David Dixon Porter 8 December 1863. She was renamed Elk 26 January 1864, and commissioned 6 May 1864, Lieutenant Commander J. H. Gillis in command. Assigned to the West Gulf Blockading Squadron, Elk operated in the waters off New Orleans, Louisiana, and Mobile, Alabama, and in the lower Mississippi River. She was constantly on the move and frequently traded fire with Confederate forces, exchanging shots with batteries off Dog River 11 March 1865, and shelling enemy pickets at Cedar Point, Florida, on 18 and 19 March. She also captured two vessels while on patrol and sent them into New Orleans for condemnation. When the magazine and ordnance stores in Mobile blew up 25 May 1865 setting fire to cotton and cotton presses and causing a general conflagration, men from Elk's crew went ashore to fight fires. After the war, Elk was laid up at New Orleans, and was sold there 24 August 1865.
