= Blackberry Campaign =

1791 expedition led by Charles Scott against Native Americans

- Part of the Northwest Indian War
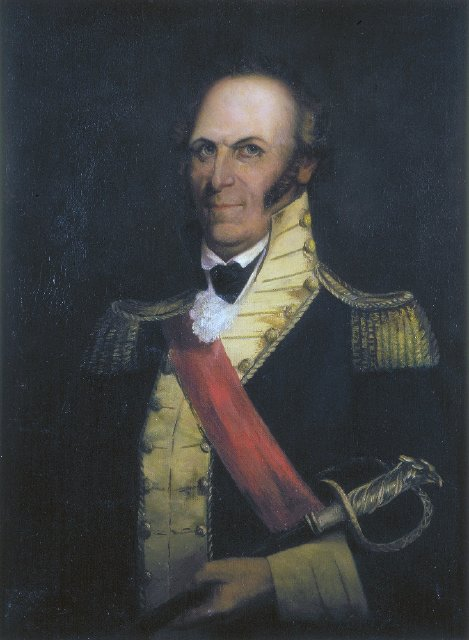
- 1907 portrait of Charles Scott
Date	May 1791
Location	Northwest Territory 40°24′3″N 86°57′36″W
Result	American victory

Belligerents
United States	Wabash Confederacy

Commanders and leaders
Charles Scott; James Wilkinson	Unknown

Casualties and losses
5 wounded	32 killed 41 captured

The Blackberry Campaign is the name given to a May 1791 expedition led by Charles Scott against Native Americans of the lower Wabash Valley, primarily Wea, Kickapoo, Miami, and Potawatomi. The intent of the campaign was to demonstrate the vulnerability of Native American villages in the Northwest Territory, to take captives who could be used for peace negotiations, and to keep the forces of the Western Confederacy off balance in preparation for a larger campaign led by Arthur St. Clair. The name Blackberry Campaign was given because soldiers stopped to pick berries to supplement their food supplies.

== Campaign ==
Following their defeat in the 1790 Harmar Campaign, the United States planned for a new campaign against Native Americans in the Northwest Territory. The main force would come from the First American Regiment and militia forces under Arthur St. Clair in Fort Washington. Leaders of the Kentucky militia were ordered to organize and lead a punitive campaign against Native Americans as a diversion from this main force. Charles Scott, a popular figure in Kentucky, quickly raised a force of nearly 1,000 mounted militia, and was therefore given command over the entire force. The purpose of Scott's campaign was to prove to the Native American nations that they were within reach of the United States, to disrupt raids against US settlements, and to divert their attention from St. Clair's campaign. United States Secretary of War Henry Knox also wanted to capture "as many as possible, particularly women and children," whose freedom could then be a condition of future peace negotiations. St. Clair said the raid was also to "gratify the people of Kentucky," for whom this was a chance to salvage their pride after the previous year's defeats.

St. Clair's force was delayed by recruiting, training, and supply, but the militia's terms of service would soon expire, so he reluctantly gave the Kentucky militia permission to begin their campaign independently. Scott's mounted force crossed the Ohio River on 19 May 1791, near the mouth of the Kentucky River. On 23 May, the militia began their march north, burning villages along the way. Native American forces, aware of a pending invasion, presumed the target of Scott's expedition was Kekionga, as the Harmar Campaign had been the previous year. According to the British Indian Department agent Alexander McKee, approximately 2,000 warriors gathered at Kekionga to meet the invaders. On 1 June, a hundred miles away, Scott's forces were spotted about 5 miles from the Wea town of Ouiatenon, on the Wabash River. Having been spotted, Scott ordered his columns to advance quickly. A detachment under John Hardin split off to attack two smaller Kickapoo villages, while Scott led the main attack on Ouiatenon. An unknown number of inhabitants escaped to a Kickapoo village across the river, but Scott reached the town before the evacuation was complete. A battalion under James Wilkinson rushed to the river a fired into the crowded evacuation boats, which Scott reported "virtually destroyed all the occupants of five canoes."

Scott had the town burned and the crops destroyed. He reported 32 Native Americans killed. Only 6 prisoners were captured at Ouiatenon, but Hardin returned with an additional 52 prisoners from the two smaller villages, mostly women and children.

Unaware that most warriors were waiting for him at Kekionga, Scott declared that they had fled out of fear and left their women and children undefended. He wanted to continue on to Kithtippecanunk to the north, but the militia's horses were too exhausted for the 18 mile trip. Instead, Wilkinson led a detachment of 360 dismounted men to the village and destroyed it, returning to Ouiatenon 12 hours later. Wilkinson described Kithtippecanunk as inhabited by French and Native Americans, living in about 70 "well finished" houses, and that "by the books, letters, and other documents found there" to be in "close connection with, and dependent on, Detroit."

The militia remained in the area of Ouiatenon until 4 June, burning several villages. They arrived near Louisville 10 days later. Scott released 16 of the weakest captives, sending them with a message that the remaining prisoners could be recovered if the Native Americans would report to the U.S. fort on the Great Miami River to "bury the hatchet and smoke the pipe of peace." 41 women and children were transferred to Captain Asheton of the First American Regiment on 15 June and sent to Fort Steuben, near the modern border of Ohio and Pennsylvania.

== Aftermath ==
The gathered Native American forces at Kekionga began to disperse in mid-June when the United States force did not arrive. One group had heard rumors that Scott's forces had gone to Vincennes, instead, and discovered the destroyed villages on their journey down the Wabash River. They initially pursued the militia, but could not keep pace with Scott's mounted forces. Native American leaders complained that the British had goaded them to war with the United States without providing them with the armament to fight it. McKee sent a letter to Sir Guy Carleton, writing that "little attention will be now paid" to potential talks of peace. Joseph Brant, who had promoted a moderate position towards the United States at Niagara and Quebec before joining the rush to Kekionga, wrote that the Shawnee and Miami had vowed not to negotiate with a people "so wicked."

In Kentucky, the raid was considered a great success, and many called for a second raid before the end of Summer. That August, James Wilkinson, who had been offered a commission in the regular Army after his role in the Blackberry Campaign, led a similar expedition starting from Fort Washington, resulting in the Battle of Kenapacomaqua. Henry Knox considered the raids a success, writing "The consternation arising from the demonstration of their being within our reach must all tend to the great object, the establishment of peace." Confidence in the main 1791 campaign increased, and shares in the Ohio Company soared. However, Beverley Randolph, the governor of Virginia, wrote that the expedition only incited the Wabash Confederacy against the United States. Both the Blackberry Campaign and the subsequent raid by Wilkinson were intended as a diversion to draw Native American forces away from the main expeditionary force led by General Arthur St. Clair in 1791. They had the opposite effect, however, uniting Native American forces against the United States and leading to St. Clair's Defeat.

Members of the Wea tribe traveled to Fort Washington and Fort Knox to claim their imprisoned family, but were told that were told that peace would not be granted until all the Wabash nations came and pledged peace, and until they acted like men rather than children. The captured villagers were not released until nearly a year had passed.
