= Hines' Raid =

U.S. Confederate exploratory mission

The Hines' Raid was a Confederate exploratory mission led by Thomas Hines, on orders from John Hunt Morgan, into the state of Indiana in June 1863 during the American Civil War. Hines aimed to prepare the groundwork of Morgan's Raid across the Ohio River into Indiana and Ohio by seeing what support the local Knights of the Golden Circle and Copperheads would provide for the main operation.

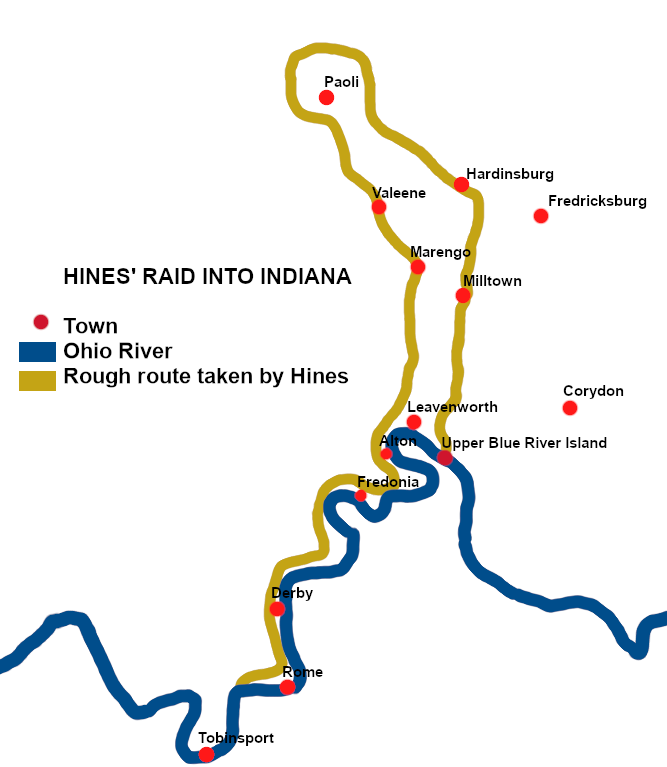
Approximate route of Hines' men, as described in "Indiana in the War of the Rebellion" and the Histories of Crawford & Orange Counties

== Mission ==
The mission began in Woodbury, Tennessee, on June 10, 1863, where Morgan had a picket camp. At the start of the mission, Hines only told his men that their mission would be "long and dangerous" and allowed any man who did not wish to go to step out; none did. From there, they traveled through Brownsville, Kentucky, and Elizabethtown, Kentucky. At Brownsville, they stole clothing from a Union sutler, consisting of shirts, trousers, and boots of U.S. Army uniforms. The group robbed a train at Elizabethtown, providing Hines' force with U.S. currency. When they reached the Ohio River, Hines informed his men that they would pose as U.S. troops under General Jeremiah T. Boyle with orders to pursue deserters, called the Indiana Grays. The crossing occurred between Alton, Indiana, and Tobinsport, Indiana, on June 17, 1863, presumably near Derby, Indiana.

Once he crossed the Ohio River, Hines' men rode through Crawford County toward Paoli in Orange County, Indiana, successfully posing as Union soldiers until about the time they passed through Marengo and Valeene on the 18th, whereupon their ruse was discovered and a messenger dispatched to Paoli in advance. A resistance was quickly formed at Paoli, which caused Hines avoid the town by passing to the west and then around it. While on this circuit around the town, Hines and his men encountered 15 armed citizens which they quickly forced to surrender, breaking their guns and taking their horses.

From here the raiders moved south towards the Ohio River where they hoped to cross and make their escape. Armed citizens and Home Guard from Perry, Crawford, Orange, Washington and Harrison counties were in pursuit. On the 19th, in Harrison County, Hines pressed a local man, Bryant Breeden, to guide them to a fordable part of the Ohio River. Breeden was strongly pro-Union and instead guided the Confederates onto Upper Blue River Island, a small island in the middle of the Ohio River near Leavenworth, Indiana. On this island, a skirmish began, killing three Confederate soldiers. Hines fled across the Ohio River with a few of his men, and the remaining Confederate force surrendered after covering Hines' escape. The Corydon Weekly Democrat said of the Home Guards, "Our citizens, though unused to actual war, showed the nerve of soldiers".

== Aftermath ==
Thomas Hines traveled throughout Kentucky by railroad until it was time to rejoin Morgan, which he did at Brandenburg, Kentucky, being put immediately in command of Morgan's artillery. Hines had to inform Morgan that they would receive no help from Hoosier Confederate sympathizers, which many believe made Morgan decide to deal more harshly with any Hoosier citizen who would later claim to be sympathetic to the Confederate cause. In Morgan's subsequent raid, on July 9, 1863, after capturing Corydon, he ransomed the citizens, partly because of Hines' treatment earlier that year. Lew Wallace would say that his actions discouraged any Hoosiers from helping Hines and Morgan.

Hines' immediate superior and Morgan's second in command, Basil W. Duke, had not previously been informed of Hines' mission. When Hines finally saw Duke, Duke remarked that Hines was resting next to a wharfboat, "apparently the most listless inoffensive youth that was ever imposed upon".

Most of the area Thomas Hines traveled in this raid is within present-day Hoosier National Forest. A historic marker was erected in 1992 on SR 62 near Dry Run Road & Old Town Leavenworth Road, Leavenworth.

== See also ==
- List of battles fought in Indiana
