= Kentucky in the American Civil War =

Coordinates: 37.5°N 85°W

Kentucky was a southern border state of key importance in the American Civil War. It officially declared its neutrality at the beginning of the war, but after a failed attempt by Confederate General Leonidas Polk to take the state of Kentucky for the Confederacy, the legislature petitioned the Union Army for assistance. Though the Confederacy controlled more than half of Kentucky early in the war, after early 1862 Kentucky came largely under U.S. control.

In the historiography of the Civil War, Kentucky is treated primarily as a southern border state, with special attention to the social divisions during the secession crisis, invasions and raids, internal violence, sporadic guerrilla warfare, federal-state relations, the ending of slavery, and the return of Confederate veterans.

Kentucky was the site of several fierce battles, including Mill Springs and Perryville. It was the arena to such military leaders as Ulysses S. Grant on the Union side, who first encountered serious Confederate gunfire coming from Columbus, Kentucky, and Confederate cavalry leader Nathan Bedford Forrest. Forrest proved to be a scourge to the Union army in western Kentucky, even making an attack on Paducah. Kentuckian John Hunt Morgan further challenged Union control, as he conducted numerous cavalry raids through the state.

Kentucky was the birthplace of Abraham Lincoln, his wife Mary Todd, and his southern counterpart, Confederate President Jefferson Davis. Lincoln had declared, early in the war, "I think to lose Kentucky is nearly the same as to lose the whole game", further stating that he hoped to have God on his side, but had to have Kentucky.

An estimated 25–40,000 Kentuckians served as Confederate soldiers, while 74–125,000 Kentuckians served as Union soldiers, including 24–25,000 Black Kentuckians, free and enslaved.

== Antebellum Kentucky ==
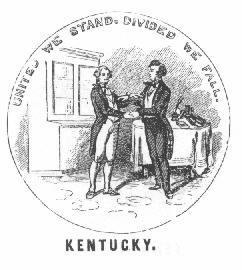
State seal of Kentucky during the war

Kentucky's citizens were split regarding the issues central to the Civil War. In 1860, slaves composed 19.5% of the Commonwealth's population, and many Unionist Kentuckians saw nothing wrong with the "peculiar institution". The Commonwealth was further bound to the South by the Mississippi River and its tributaries, which were the main commercial outlet for her surplus produce, although railroad connections to the North were beginning to diminish the importance of this tie. The ancestors of many Kentuckians hailed from Southern states like Virginia, North Carolina, and Tennessee, but many Kentucky children were beginning to migrate toward the North.

Kentucky, along with North Carolina, also boasted the best educational systems in the South. Transylvania University had long been one of the most respected institutions of higher learning in the nation, and while its reputation had begun to fade by 1860, other Kentucky schools like Centre College and Georgetown College were gaining prominence.

Politically, the Commonwealth had produced some of the country's best known leaders. Former Vice Presidents John C. Breckinridge and Richard M. Johnson both hailed from the state, as did Henry Clay, John J. Crittenden, John M. Harlan, U.S. President Abraham Lincoln, and Confederate President Jefferson Davis. However, by the time of the Civil War, Kentucky was in a politically confused state. The decline of the Whig Party, which Clay had founded, had left many politicians looking for an identity. Many joined the Democratic Party, a few joined the newly formed Republican Party, while still others associated with one of numerous minor parties such as the Know Nothing Party. In the 1860 presidential election, the Constitutional Union Party, with Tennessee-native John Bell as its presidential candidate and Massachusetts-native Edward Everett as its vice-presidential candidate, won the state. The party was composed mainly of former Whigs and Know-Nothings.

Kentucky was strategically important to both the North and South. The Commonwealth ranked ninth in population by 1860, and was a major producer of such agricultural commodities as tobacco, corn, wheat, hemp, and flax. Geographically, Kentucky was important to the South because the Ohio River would provide a defensible boundary along the entire length of the state.

Kentucky governor Beriah Magoffin believed that the rights of the Southern states had been violated and favored the right of secession, but sought all possible avenues to avoid it. On December 9, 1860, he sent a letter to the other slave state governors suggesting that they come to an agreement with the North that would include strict enforcement of the Fugitive Slave Act, a division of common territories at the 37th parallel, a guarantee of free use of the Mississippi River, and a Southern veto over slave legislation. Magoffin proposed a conference of slave states, followed by a conference of all the states to secure these concessions. Due to the escalating pace of events, neither conference was ever held.

Magoffin called a special session of the Kentucky General Assembly on December 27, 1860, and asked legislators for a convention of Kentuckians to decide the Commonwealth's course regarding secession. The majority of the General Assembly had Unionist sympathies, however, and declined the governor's request, fearing that the state's voters would favor secession. The Assembly did, however, send six delegates to a February 4 Peace Conference in Washington, D.C., and asked Congress to call a national convention to consider potential resolutions to the secession crisis, including the Crittenden Compromise, authored by Kentuckian John J. Crittenden.

When the General Assembly convened again on March 20, it called for a convention of the border states in the Kentucky capital of Frankfort on May 27, 1861. Again, the call went unheeded. Legislators also passed a proposed Thirteenth Amendment to the Constitution that would have guaranteed slavery in states where it was already legal.

President Lincoln recognized the importance of Kentucky when, in a September 1861 letter to Orville Browning, he had written:

I think to lose Kentucky is nearly the same as to lose the whole game. Kentucky gone, we cannot hold Missouri, nor Maryland. These all against us, and the job on our hands is too large for us. We would as well consent to separation at once, including the surrender of this capitol.

== War breaks out ==
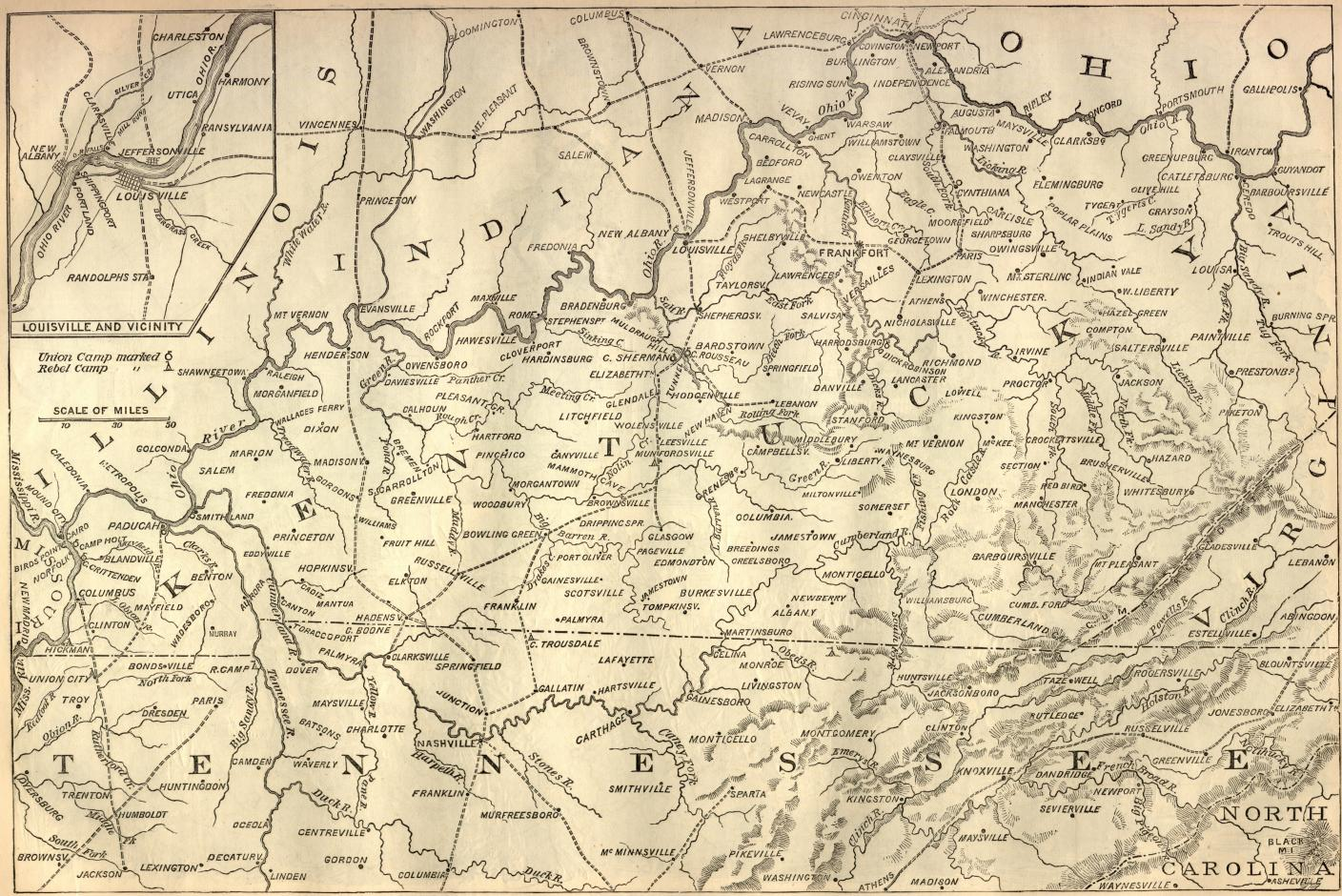
Civil War battle map of Kentucky, published in Harper's Weekly October 19, 1861

On April 15, 1861, President Lincoln sent a telegram to Kentucky governor Beriah Magoffin requesting that the Commonwealth supply part of the initial 75,000 troops to put down the rebellion. Magoffin, a Southern sympathizer, replied "President Lincoln, Washington, D.C. I will send not a man nor a dollar for the wicked purpose of subduing my sister Southern states. B. Magoffin". Instead, most Kentuckians favored John J. Crittenden's position that the Commonwealth should act as a mediator between the two sides. To that end, both houses of the General Assembly passed declarations of neutrality, a position officially declared by Governor Magoffin on May 20, 1861.

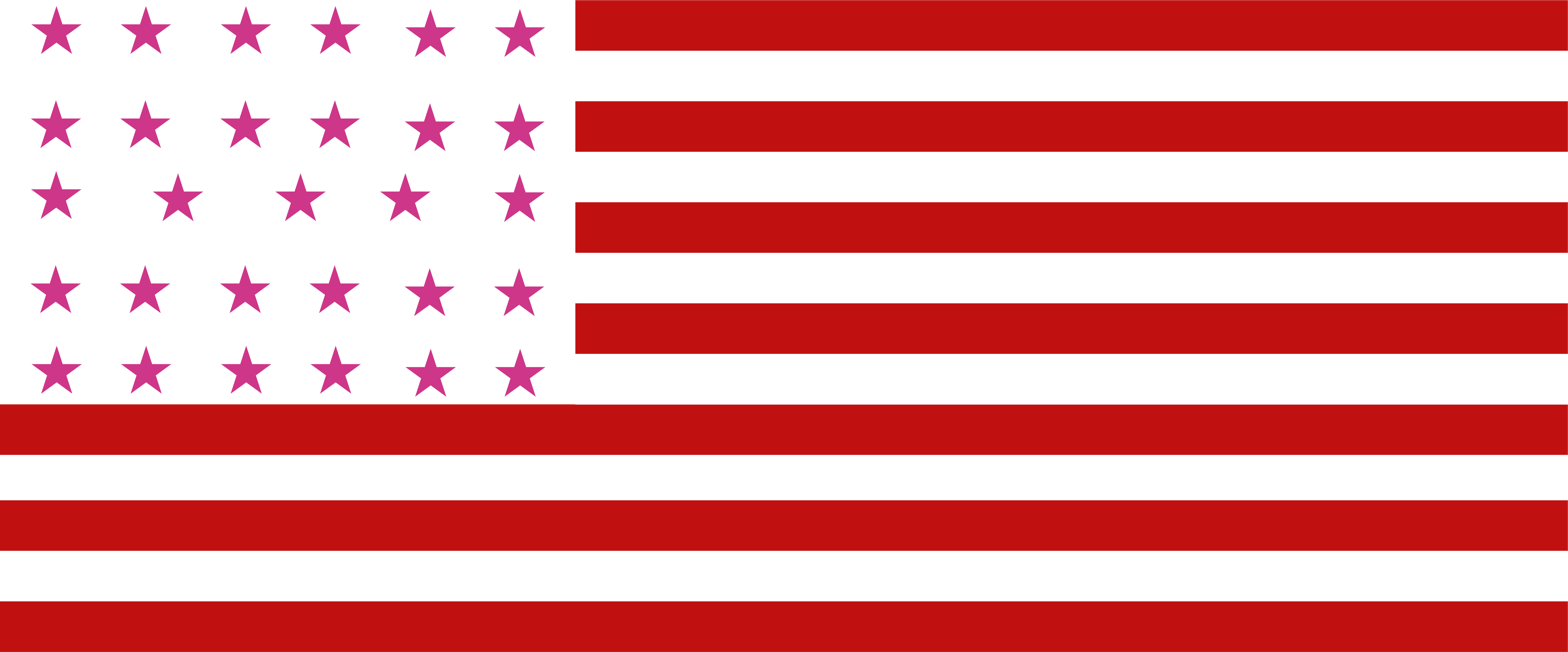
Digital reconstruction of the US flag flown by a pro-union Squatter in Henderson County

Both sides respected the Commonwealth's neutrality, but positioned themselves strategically to take advantage of any change in the situation. Union forces established Camp Clay in Ohio just north of the city of Newport, Kentucky, and Camp Joe Holt in Indiana opposite Louisville, Kentucky. Meanwhile, Confederate troops constructed Forts Donelson and Henry just across Kentucky's southern border in Tennessee, and stationed troops fewer than 50 yards from Cumberland Gap. Volunteers from the Commonwealth left the state to join up with whichever side they favored. Some covert recruiting also took place. Nearly 60 infantry regiments served in the Union armies versus just 9 in the Confederate. However, a rather large number of cavalry outfits joined the latter. John Breckenridge originally commanded the "Orphan Brigade" of the Army of Tennessee, consisting of the 2nd, 3rd, 4th, 6th, and 9th Kentucky Infantry. The brigade's nickname came about allegedly because the soldiers' home counties were occupied by Union troops for most of the war and they couldn't go home to them.

Realizing that neutrality was becoming less and less feasible, six prominent Kentuckians met to find some solution for a state caught in the middle of a conflict. Governor Magoffin, John C. Breckinridge, and Richard Hawes represented the secessionists' position, while Crittenden, Archibald Dixon, and S. S. Nicholas advocated the Northern cause. The sextet agreed only to continue the doctrine of neutrality, however, and called for the formation of a five-member board to coordinate the Commonwealth's defense. The General Assembly created the board on May 24 and vested in it supervision of the state's military, a power reserved in the Kentucky Constitution for the governor.

The Commonwealth's military forces, however, proved to be just as divided as the general populace. The State Guard, under the command of Simon B. Buckner, largely favored the Confederate cause, while the newly formed Home Guard were mostly Unionists. Several close calls almost started a conflict within the state, but Buckner successfully negotiated with Union general George B. McClellan and Tennessee governor Isham Harris to maintain the Commonwealth's neutrality through the summer.

=== Elections of 1861 ===
1861 Kentucky House of Representatives election Union Democratic Party (75) States' Rights Party (25)

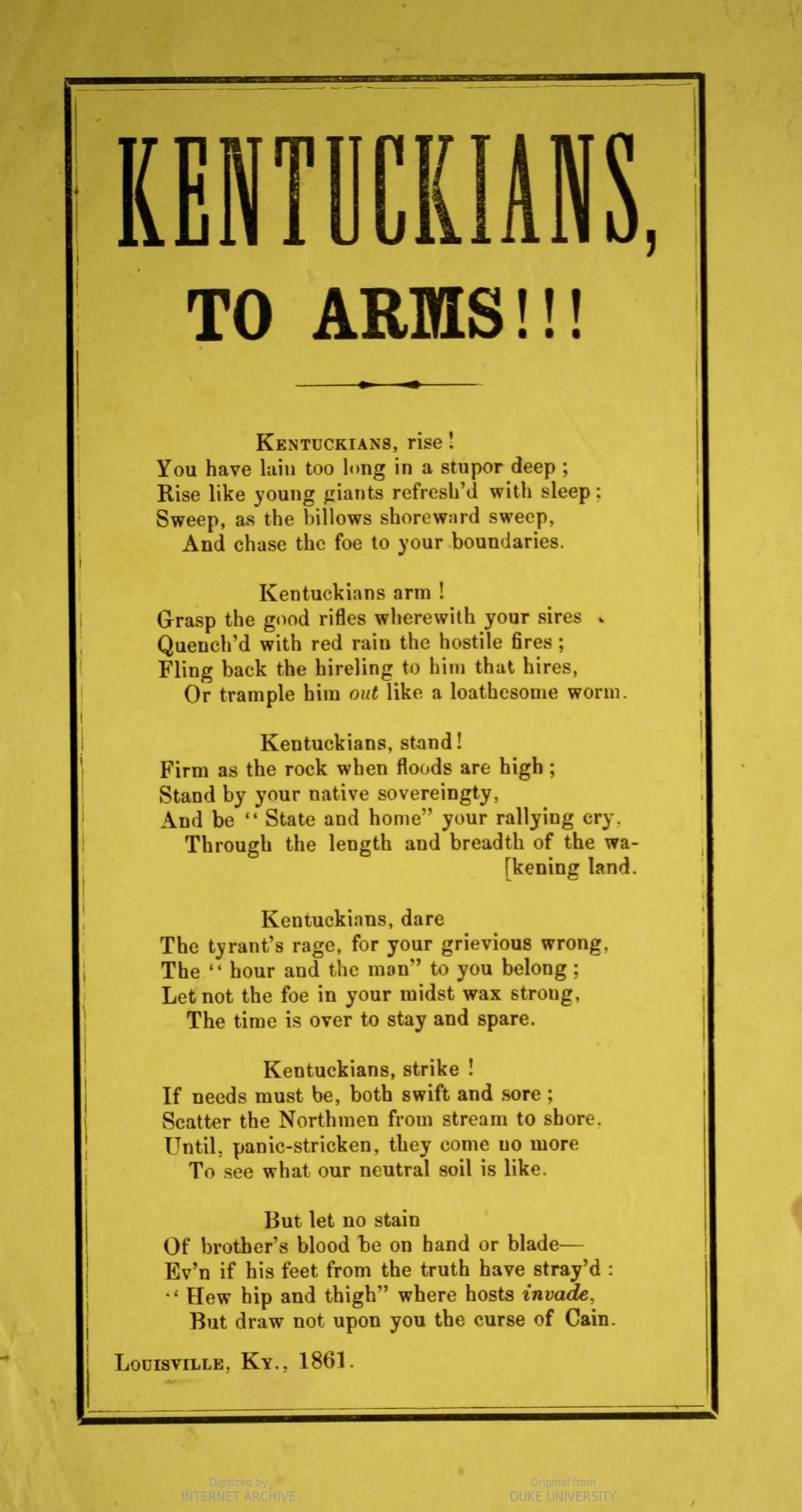
"Kentuckians, to arms!!!" Confederate recruitment broadside published Louisville, 1861 (Duke University Libraries)

The tide of public opinion was beginning to turn in Kentucky, however. In a special congressional election held June 20, 1861, Unionist candidates won nine of Kentucky's ten congressional seats. Confederate sympathizers won only the Jackson Purchase region, which was economically linked to Tennessee by the Cumberland and Tennessee Rivers. Seeing imminent defeat at the polls, many Confederate sympathizers boycotted the election; the total number of ballots cast was just over half the number that had been cast in the previous year's election. Governor Magoffin was dealt a further blow in the August 5 election for state legislators. This election resulted in veto-proof Unionist majorities of 75–25 in the House and 27–11 in the Senate.

From that point forward, most of Magoffin's vetoes to protect southern interests were overridden in the General Assembly. After clashing with the Assembly for over a year on even the most trivial issues, Magoffin decided that resignation was his only option. Magoffin's lieutenant governor, Linn Boyd, had died in office, and Senate Speaker John Fisk, next in line for the governorship, was not acceptable to Magoffin as a successor. In an intricate plan worked out with the General Assembly, Fisk resigned as speaker and the Senate elevated Magoffin's chosen successor, James F. Robinson, to the post. Magoffin then resigned, promoting Robinson to governor, and Fisk was re-elected as Senate Speaker.

Almost immediately following the results of the 1861 election, William "Bull" Nelson established Camp Dick Robinson, a Union recruiting camp, in Garrard County. When Crittenden objected to this violation of Kentucky's neutrality, Nelson replied, "That a camp of loyal Union men, native Kentuckians, should assemble in camp under the flag of the Union and upon their native soil should be a cause of apprehension is something I do not clearly understand." Governor Magoffin appealed to President Lincoln to close the camp, but he refused. Meanwhile, Confederate volunteers covertly crossed the Tennessee border and massed at Camp Boone, just south of Guthrie. Kentucky's fragile neutrality was nearing an end.

Unionist sentiment while reflecting a solid majority within the state was tenuous at best. This is documented by E.F. Drake, a Louisville resident, who wrote to Salmon P. Chase in 1861:

If the late vote of Ky is relied on, as an indication of the strength of the Union party it will deceive you. The vote showed a large majority, but when carefully considered it will be found that nearly all old men are unionists at heart and in action while their sons, living in their fathers houses are heading rebellion. There is another large class, who sympathize with the rebels, yet from policy vote and talk Union, and almost every Union man considers the South aggrieved, and expects an end of the war only by agreeing to any demand by way of guarantee which then South may demand. ... I am sure Kentucky is only a Union State for fear of the consequences of being the seat of war as a border Confederate State.

== Neutrality violated ==
On September 4, 1861, Confederate Major General Leonidas Polk violated the Commonwealth's neutrality by ordering Brigadier General Gideon Johnson Pillow to occupy Columbus. Columbus was of strategic importance both because it was the terminus of the Mobile and Ohio Railroad and because of its position along the Mississippi River. Polk constructed Fort DeRussy in the high bluffs of Columbus, and equipped it with 143 cannons. Polk called the fort "The Gibraltar of the West". To control traffic along the river, Polk stretched an anchor chain across the river from the bank in Columbus to the opposite bank in Belmont, Missouri. Each link of the chain measured eleven inches long by eight inches wide and weighed twenty pounds. The chain soon broke under its own weight, but Union forces did not learn of this fact until early 1862.

In response to the Confederate invasion, Union Brigadier General Ulysses S. Grant left Cairo, Illinois, and entered Paducah, Kentucky, on September 6, which gave the Union control of the northern end of the New Orleans and Ohio Railroad and the mouth of the Tennessee River. Governor Magoffin denounced both sides for violating the Commonwealth's neutrality, calling for both sides to withdraw. However, on September 7, 1861, the General Assembly passed a resolution ordering the withdrawal of only Confederate forces. Magoffin vetoed the resolution, but both houses overrode the veto, and Magoffin issued the proclamation. The General Assembly ordered the flag of the United States to be raised over the state capitol in Frankfort, declaring its allegiance with the Union.

Its neutrality broken, both sides quickly moved to establish advantageous positions in the Commonwealth. Confederate forces under Albert Sidney Johnston formed a line in the southern regions of Kentucky and the northern regions of Tennessee, stretching from Columbus in the west to Cumberland Gap in the east. Johnston dispatched Simon B. Buckner to fortify the middle of the line in Bowling Green. Buckner arrived on September 18, 1861, and immediately began intensive drill sessions and constructing elaborate defenses in anticipation of a Union strike. So extensive were the fortifications at Bowling Green that a Union officer who later surveyed them commented, "The labor has been immense – their troops cannot be well drilled – their time must have been chiefly spent in hard work, with the axe and spade."

== Local conflicts in southern Appalachia ==
Local violence wracked the state during the war. Many parts of Kentucky had a dominant majority and a determined minority in supporting North or South. Assassinations were common--the famous Hatfield–McCoy feud was a postwar continuation of that violence. To quote Noel Fisher (2001):

"A third constant in Civil War Appalachia was the prevalence of partisan violence. Throughout this region, loyalists, secessionists, deserters, and men with little loyalty to either side formed organized bands, fought each other as well as occupying troops, terrorized the population, and spread fear, chaos, and destruction. Military forces stationed in the Appalachian regions, whether regular troops or home guards, frequently resorted to extreme methods, including executing partisans summarily, destroying the homes of suspected bushwhackers, and torturing families to gain information. This epidemic of violence created a widespread sense of insecurity, forced hundreds of residents to flee, and contributed to the region's economic distress, demoralization, and division." [See Noel Fisher, "Feelin' Mighty Southern: Recent Scholarship on Southern Appalachia in the Civil War" in Civil War History. Volume: 47. Issue: 4. 2001. 334-346; for more detail see Harrison, The Civil War in Kentucky (1975) online, and E.M. Coulter online

== Confederate state government ==
The Seal of Kentucky used during the George W. Johnson administration

The elected government of Kentucky being decidedly Union, a group of Southern sympathizers began formulating a plan to create a Confederate shadow government for the Commonwealth. Following a preliminary meeting on October 29, 1861, delegates from 68 of Kentucky's 110 counties met at the Clark House in Russellville on November 18. The convention passed an ordinance of secession, adopted a new state seal, and elected Scott County native George W. Johnson as governor. Bowling Green, now occupied by General Johnston himself, was designated as the state capital, though the delegates provided that the government could meet anywhere deemed appropriate by the provisional legislative council and governor. Being unable to flesh out a complete constitution and system of laws, the delegates voted that "the Constitution and laws of Kentucky, not inconsistent with the acts of this Convention, and the establishment of this Government, and the laws which may be enacted by the Governor and Council, shall be the laws of this state." Though Jefferson Davis had some reservation about the circumvention of the elected General Assembly in forming the Confederate government, Kentucky was admitted to the Confederacy on December 10, 1861. Kentucky was represented by the central star on the Confederate battle flag.

Though it existed throughout the war and it controlled more than half the territory of Kentucky having Confederate governance from Bowling Green early in the war, Kentucky's provisional government had very little effect on the events in the Commonwealth or in the war after 1862. When General Johnston abandoned Bowling Green in early 1862, the government's officers traveled with his army, and Governor Johnson was killed in active duty at the Battle of Shiloh. Continuing to travel with the Army of Tennessee, the government re-entered Kentucky during Braxton Bragg's campaign in the Commonwealth, but was driven out permanently following the Battle of Perryville. From that time forward, the government existed primarily on paper, and dissolved following the war.

== Confederate line broken ==
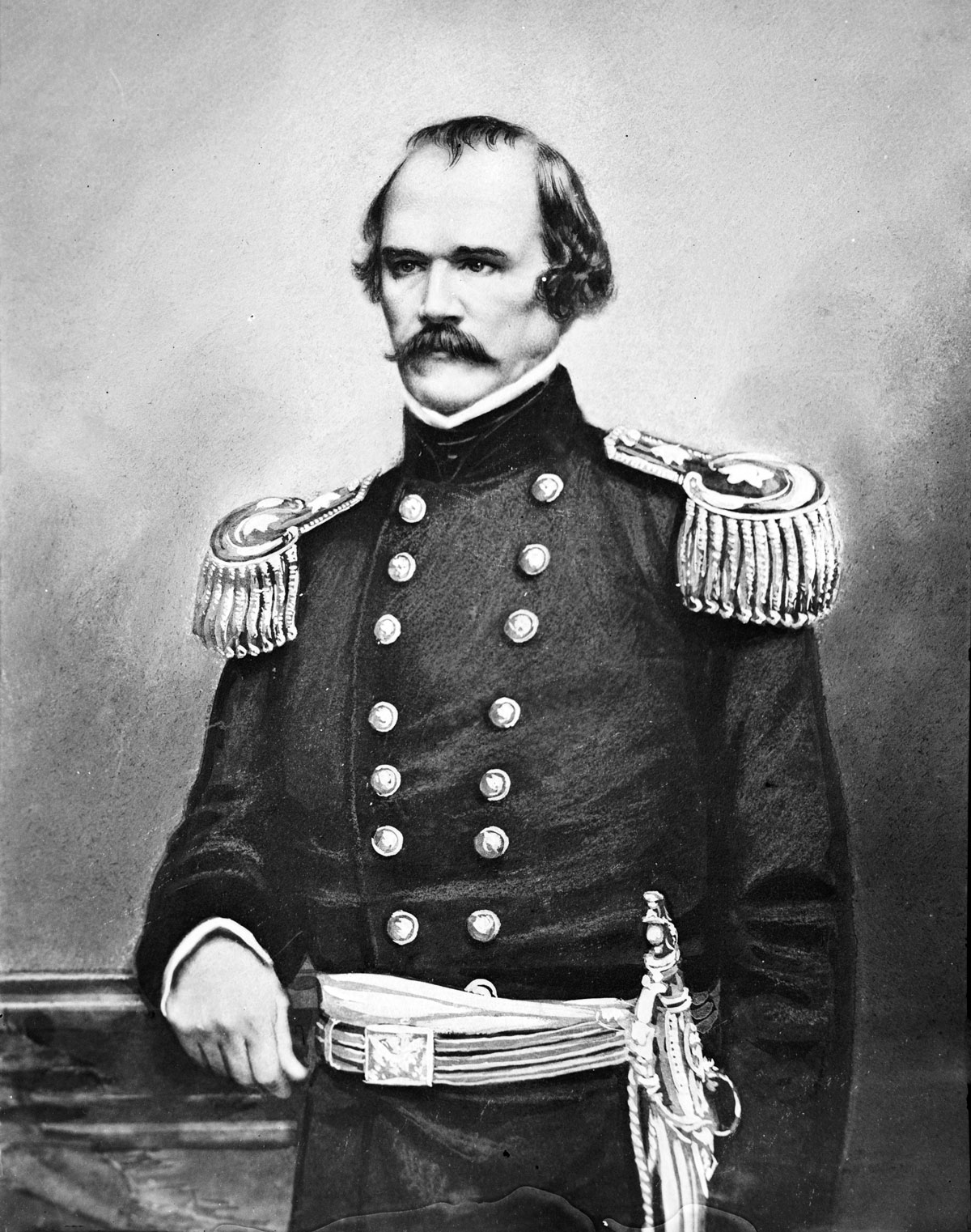
Albert Sidney Johnston was charged with maintaining a Confederate defensive line in southern Kentucky and northern Tennessee.

Many small skirmishes occurred in Kentucky in 1861, including "Forrest's First Fight" at Sacramento, but battles of great military significance did not begin in earnest until 1862.

=== Battle of Mill Springs ===
In January 1862, Union General George H. Thomas began to advance on George B. Crittenden's position at Mill Springs. In rainy conditions, Thomas' army moved slowly, and Crittenden advanced to meet them before they could be reinforced by forces from nearby Somerset. The battle commenced on January 19, 1862, and favored Crittenden's forces early on. However, in the confusion caused by the rain and fog, Felix Zollicoffer, commander of Crittenden's First Brigade, rode into the midst of the Union forces. A Confederate officer galloped in, yelling at Zollicoffer to inform him of his mistake. Upon being identified, Zollicoffer was shot out of the saddle and killed, disheartening the Confederates and turning the tide of the battle. Thomas' reinforcements arrived, and Crittenden's forces were forced to retreat across the flooded Cumberland River. Many drowned in the process, and Crittenden was given the blame for the debacle.

=== Forts Henry and Donelson ===
General Johnston learned of Crittenden's defeat at Mill Springs through an account of the battle printed in a Louisville newspaper. However, he had larger concerns, as Ulysses S. Grant was advancing down the Cumberland and Tennessee Rivers toward Forts Henry and Donelson. Union ironclads routed the Confederate river gunboats on the Mississippi River during the Battle of Lucas Bend on January 11, forcing them back to Columbus. Following Grant's victory at the Battle of Belmont, General Polk had anticipated that Union forces would target the Mississippi River and attack Columbus, and had withdrawn most of his forces to that location. Lloyd Tilghman was left to defend Fort Henry with fewer than 3,000 men. Union troops began their assault on the fort on February 5, 1862, and Tilghman surrendered the following day.

General Johnston countered by ordering Pillow, Buckner, and John B. Floyd to the defense of Fort Donelson. None of the three was specifically given command, a decision that would prove costly. Grant arrived at Donelson on February 13, and found himself outnumbered by some 3,000 troops. Floyd failed to capitalize on his advantage, however, and Grant was reinforced the next day. On February 15, the Confederates had nearly cleared an escape route to Nashville, but arguments among the generals delayed the retreat. Floyd seized a steamboat and used it to evacuate his forces, while Pillow fled in a rowboat. Buckner, left alone in command, proposed a cease-fire to Grant while terms of surrender were negotiated. Grant's reply – that only "an unconditional and immediate surrender" could be accepted – made him a hero in Union eyes, and earned him the nickname "Unconditional Surrender" Grant.

=== Confederate withdrawal ===
The collapse of Forts Henry and Donelson made Polk's position at Columbus untenable; the Confederates were forced to abandon "The Gibraltar of the West". His line shattered, Johnston abandoned Bowling Green on February 11, 1862, retreating first to Nashville, then further south to join P. G. T. Beauregard and Braxton Bragg at Corinth, Mississippi. Cumberland Gap, the final piece of Johnston's line, finally fell to Union forces in June 1862.

== Morgan's first raids ==
Almost immediately following the Confederate withdrawal from Kentucky, Confederate General John Hunt Morgan began the first of his raids into the state. In May 1862, Morgan's riders captured two Union trains at Cave City, but his apparent goal was to agitate Union forces; he paroled everyone aboard, returned one of the trains, and sent the occupants back to Louisville. This move accomplished little except to embolden Morgan for a more extensive raid in July.

On July 4, 1862, Morgan and his men left Knoxville, Tennessee, and captured Tompkinsville five days later. After a brief stop in Glasgow, where many of Morgan's troops were from, they continued to Lebanon, capturing it on July 12. From there, the cavalry stopped in Harrodsburg and Georgetown, and upon seeing that Lexington was too heavily fortified, turned their attention to the town of Cynthiana. Morgan was again victorious at Cynthiana, but with Union reinforcements closing in on him, he paroled all the captured soldiers from the battle and rode to Paris.

On their exit from the Commonwealth, the cavalry picked up 50 recruits at Richmond. They also stopped in Somerset, where Morgan instructed his telegrapher, George "Lightning" Ellsworth to send taunting messages to General Jeremiah Boyle and publisher George Prentice. At the completion of his escape through the Commonwealth, Morgan claimed to have captured and paroled 1,200 enemy soldiers, recruited 300 men and acquired several hundred horses for his cavalry, used or destroyed supplies in seventeen towns, and incurred fewer than 100 casualties.

== Smith and Bragg advance ==
Morgan's exploits encouraged Confederate General Edmund Kirby Smith to move on Kentucky. After conferring with General Braxton Bragg at Chattanooga, Smith moved to drive George W. Morgan from Cumberland Gap in August 1862. Both generals understood that Smith would capture Cumberland Gap, then join Bragg in Middle Tennessee. When the two armies met, Bragg would command the combined force against Don Carlos Buell in Nashville. Once Nashville was captured, Bragg and Smith would commence an invasion of Kentucky.

As the battle at Cumberland Gap wore on, Morgan refused to retreat or surrender his position. Thinking an invasion of Kentucky was preferable to a long siege on the Gap, Smith left a detachment to handle Morgan and proceeded toward Lexington, abandoning the plan to join Bragg and capture Nashville. The move forced Bragg's hand, and he too entered Kentucky on August 28. As Smith progressed toward Lexington, Indiana governor Oliver P. Morton decided that Governor Robinson was doing too little to support the Union cause. He dispatched regiments across the Ohio into Louisville, and considered himself governor of both Indiana and Kentucky.

=== Battle of Richmond ===
Upon learning of Smith's advance into Kentucky, General "Bull" Nelson prepared to engage the invading army at the Kentucky River to take advantage of the better terrain, but delayed the engagement so that more reinforcements could arrive. He ordered the brigades under Mahlon Manson and Charles Cruft not to attack Smith, but to withdraw to Lexington, but the orders either were not delivered in time, or they were ignored.

After some preliminary skirmishes, Smith's army met Mahlon's brigade at Richmond, Kentucky, on August 30. Smith's more experienced troops broke the center of the Union line, and Mahlon fell back to Richmond Cemetery. By the afternoon, General Nelson arrived and tried to rally the troops. Riding along the front of the Union line, the portly Nelson exclaimed, "Boys, if they can't hit me, they can't hit a barn door!" Unfortunately for Nelson, he was soon hit twice by Confederate gunfire. Though Nelson was seriously wounded, he escaped the battle as Confederate cavalry moved to cut off the Union retreat. He left behind 206 killed, 844 wounded, and 4,303 missing. With only 98 killed, 492 wounded, and 10 missing, Smith had won one of the most complete Confederate victories of the entire war.

=== Battle of Munfordville ===
While Smith was continuing on to Lexington, Bragg was just entering Kentucky, having delayed at Chattanooga until August 28. Bragg was told that there were ample supplies in the Glasgow area, but upon learning that Bragg had entered Kentucky, Buell left George Thomas to guard Nashville and moved the rest of his army to heavily fortified Bowling Green.

Meanwhile, Smith had dispatched Colonel John Scott to look for Bragg. On the night of September 13, Scott encountered John T. Wilder at Munfordville, and demanded his surrender. Scott requested the aid of James Chalmers' Mississippi brigade, which moved to support Scott throughout the night. The assault commenced the next morning, and though outnumbered, Scott's forces inflicted more than 200 casualties in the early fighting. At 9:30 a.m., Chalmers tried to intimidate Wilder into surrender, sending a flag of truce with the message, "You have made a gallant defense of your position, and to avoid further bloodshed I demand an unconditional surrender of your forces. I have six regiments of infantry, one battalion of infantry sharpshooters, and have just been reinforced by a brigade of cavalry, under Colonel Scott, with two battalions of infantry." Upon receiving this message, Wilder replied "Thank you for your compliments. If you wish to avoid further bloodshed, keep out of the reach of my guns."

Wilder was soon reinforced by Colonel Cyrus L. Dunham, who brought a force of 4,000 men. Scott and Chalmers sought assistance from Bragg's main army. Bragg was incensed, but arrived the next day to take charge of the battle. Bragg deployed forces under William J. Hardee and Leonidas Polk to surround the town, delaying his assault until September 17. Bragg sent another request for the force's surrender. At a council of war, Wilder made an unusual request of Bragg's subordinate, Simon B. Buckner – that he be allowed to inspect the forces that now surrounded him to determine whether surrender were the correct course of action. Delighted by this supreme compliment, Buckner obliged, and after surveying the Confederate line, Wilder surrendered.

Wilder's force of some 4,000 men was paroled and directed to Bowling Green, where Bragg hoped they would be a drain on Buell's supplies. The delay caused by the Confederate victory at Munfordville may well have cost them a much more important prize – Louisville.

=== Inauguration of Governor Hawes ===
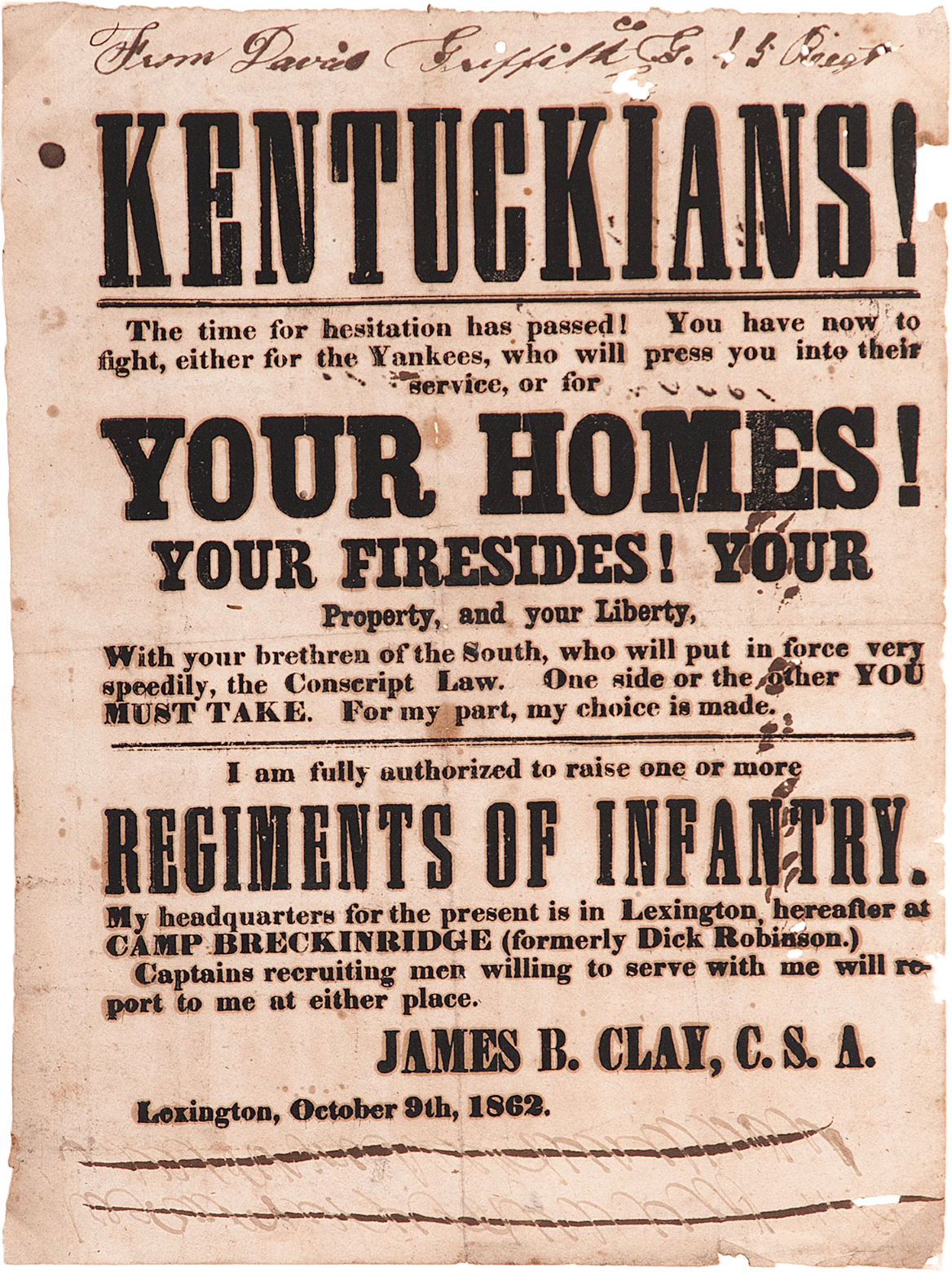
Broadside by James Brown Clay, October 1862

While Bragg rested his troops and planned his next move, Buell marched north from Bowling Green and arrived in Louisville on September 25. Seeing his primary objective fallen into Union hands, Bragg turned to Bardstown, where he had expected to meet Smith. Smith was actually operating independently near Frankfort, and Bragg, now painfully aware that the lack of cooperation with Smith might prove the Confederates' undoing in Kentucky, began to disperse his troops into defensive postures at Bardstown, Shelbyville, and Danville.

Both Bragg and Smith had been disappointed with the number of volunteers from Kentucky. Wagonloads of rifles had been sent to the Commonwealth to equip the anticipated recruits, but although Confederate sympathies were high, willing volunteers were not, and many of the rifles remained on the wagons. Bragg hoped to rally potential recruits by installing Richard Hawes, governor of Kentucky's Confederate shadow government, in an inauguration ceremony in Frankfort. The elected government fled to Louisville just before the Confederates arrived in Frankfort.

The ceremony took place on October 4, 1862. First, Bragg addressed the assembled partisan crowd, promising to defend the Commonwealth. Then Hawes, who had taken the oath of office months earlier while traveling with Bragg's Army of Tennessee, delivered a lengthy inaugural address. He told the crowd that the provisional government would "institute as far as possible such civil institutions, as will protect persons and property, until the people in their sovereign capacity can establish a permanent Government founded on the will of the majority."

The promises made by Bragg and Hawes were short-lived. Before the inaugural ball could be held, Buell's forces had descended on the state capital, firing artillery shells that shattered the jovial atmosphere and put the Confederate forces to flight. Bragg had sorely underestimated Buell's ability to make a rapid advance on his position. While preparations were being made for Hawes' inauguration, Buell was already forcing the Confederate army from Shelbyville. Bragg ordered Leonidas Polk from Bardstown to attack Buell's flank, but Polk was already under attack and retreating to Bryantsville. Bragg began a retreat from Frankfort to Harrodsburg to regroup with Polk. Meanwhile, Smith prepared to defend Lexington, where he assumed the bulk of Buell's force would be directed.

=== Battle of Perryville ===
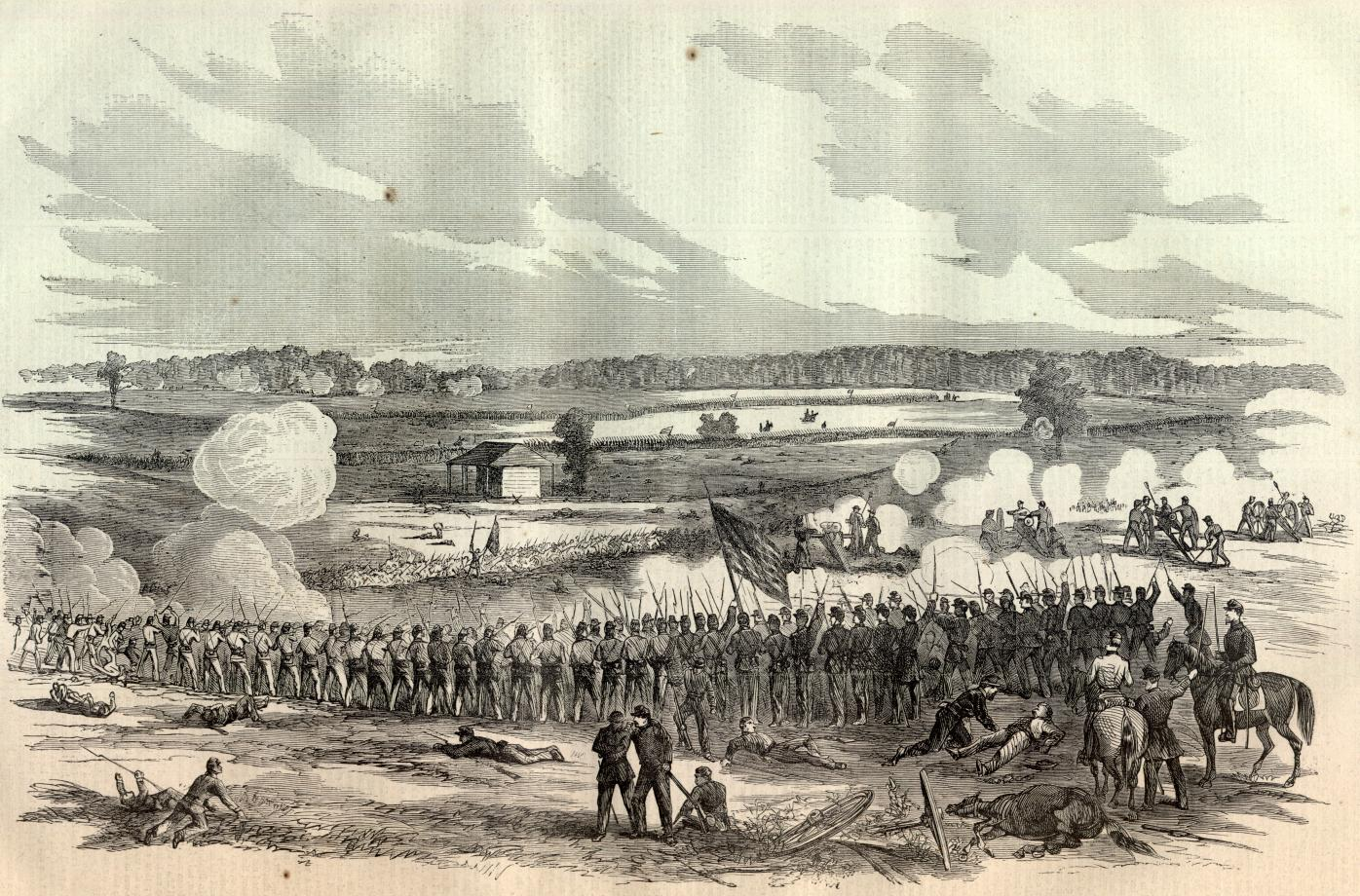
The Battle of Perryville battlefield as depicted in Harper's Weekly, November 1, 1862

By October 7, Polk's forces had fallen back to the town of Perryville. The dry summer of 1862 had left water in short supply, and when the Union troops learned of water in Perryville's Doctor's Creek, they began to move on the Confederate position. Bragg shared Smith's assumption that the bulk of the Union attack would be directed at Lexington and Frankfort, and ordered Polk's forces to attack and destroy the approaching Union force before proceeding to Versailles to meet Smith. The Confederate soldiers in Perryville, however, realized that a much larger force was approaching, and assumed a defensive posture. In fact, Buell, Charles Champion Gilbert, Alexander McCook, and Thomas Crittenden were all approaching Perryville.

The Confederates were not the only ones to misjudge the situation, however. When Bragg learned that his men had not attacked as ordered, he came to Perryville himself to lead the attack. In realigning to an attack posture, the Confederates stirred such a cloud of dust that the approaching Union force believed they were retreating to Harrodsburg. This gave Bragg's men the advantage of surprise when they opened fire on McCook's forces at 2 p.m. on October 8. While McCook was being pushed back on the left flank, the Union center held strong until the right flank began to collapse.

It was not until late afternoon that Buell learned of McCook's plight, whereupon he sent two brigades from Gilbert's corps to reinforce him. This halted the Confederate advance on McCook north of Perryville. Meanwhile, small Confederate brigades encountered Gilbert's force of 20,000 men to the west and Crittenden's force, also 20,000 strong, to the south. Only then did Bragg realize that he was facing Buell's main force, and that he was vastly outnumbered. As night approached and halted the battle, Bragg conferred with his officers and decided to retreat to Harrodsburg to meet Smith. From Harrodsburg, the Confederates exited Kentucky through Cumberland Gap. For the remainder of the war, there would be no concerted efforts by the Confederacy to hold Kentucky.

On December 17, 1862, under the terms of General Order No. 11, thirty Jewish families, longtime residents all, were forced from their homes. Cesar Kaskel, a prominent local Jewish businessman, dispatched a telegram to President Lincoln, and met with him, eventually succeeding in getting the order revoked.

== Morgan strikes again ==
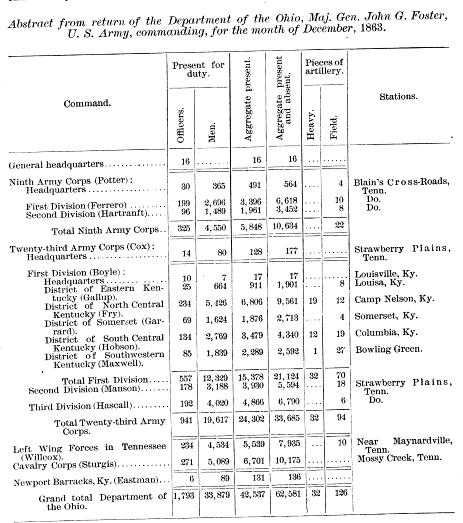
1863 abstract return showing Union Forces in Kentucky

His inability to engage Bragg and Smith on their retreat from Kentucky led to Buell being replaced by General William Rosecrans. Rosecrans encamped at Nashville during the fall and early winter of 1862. Believing that Rosecrans would begin a campaign as soon as sufficient supplies were accumulated, Bragg dispatched John Hunt Morgan back into Kentucky in December 1862 to cut the supply line afforded Rosecrans by the Louisville and Nashville Railroad. Morgan's raid was part of a plan to disrupt Union supply lines. While Morgan was moving into Kentucky, Nathan Bedford Forrest was mounting a raid through West Tennessee into the Kentucky Purchase while Earl Van Dorn raided into southern West Tennessee.

=== The Christmas Raid ===
Morgan's men crossed into Kentucky on December 22 and captured a Union supply wagon bound for Glasgow. On Christmas Day, Morgan's men rode through Glasgow, bound for Bacon Creek Station and the L&N bridge span. After quelling the stiff Union resistance, Morgan's men destroyed the bridge and several miles of railroad track. Whatever else might happen, they had succeeded in disrupting Rosecrans' supply line.

From Bacon Creek, Morgan rode to Elizabethtown, arriving on December 27. The Union commander, Colonel H. S. Smith, demanded Morgan's surrender, but Morgan turned the tables, surrounded Smith, and, after a short skirmish, accepted his surrender. Again, Morgan destroyed the L&N infrastructure in the area, then began planning an escape back to Tennessee.

Colonel John M. Harlan's artillery shelled Morgan's force as it crossed the Rolling Fork River on December 29, seriously wounding First Brigade commander Basil W. Duke. Duke was taken to Bardstown for medical treatment, however, and recovered in time to rejoin the Confederate retreat the next day.

Freezing rain plagued Morgan's men as they encamped at Springfield on the night of December 30. Worse yet, scouts reported a massive Union force concentrated nine miles away at Lebanon. With Frank Wolford's men moving on his position, Morgan made the difficult decision to move out just after midnight in ever-worsening weather. He ordered a few companies to create a diversion, feigning an attack on Lebanon and burning fence rails to give the appearance of campfires, while the main body of his force continued to Campbellsville. The plan worked, and following a march that many described as their most miserable night of the war, Morgan's men arrived safely in Campbellsville on New Year's Eve and captured some welcome supplies. The following day, they proceeded through Columbia, and returned to Tennessee on January 3.

=== Morgan crosses the Ohio ===
Following the Christmas Raid, there were only minor incursions into Kentucky by various units under Roy Cluke, John Pegram, Humphrey Marshall, among others. Frustrated Union commanders could only react to these unpredictable raids. Morgan would soon do them a favor, however, by raising the visibility of his next raid.

It was widely reported that since his December 1862 marriage, Morgan had lost some of his bravado. Morgan, eager to dispel such rumors and weary of guarding Bragg's left flank, proposed a raid through Kentucky and across the Ohio River. Bragg, fearing an attack from Rosecrans, welcomed the idea of a distraction that would take the pressure off his Army of Tennessee. Morgan gathered his men to an area between Liberty and Alexandria, Tennessee. On June 10, he addressed his unit, telling them that Bragg had sanctioned a raid to Louisville, and if conditions permitted, across the Ohio River into Indiana and possibly Ohio. He confided Bragg's true orders – to halt at the Ohio River – only to trusted confidant Basil Duke.

The raid was delayed by orders to intercept a Union raiding party moving on Knoxville, Tennessee, but after three miserable weeks of floundering through muddy conditions, Morgan's men still had not located the enemy. They finally began entering Kentucky on July 2, 1863. Two days later, Morgan engaged Colonel Orlando Moore's forces at Tebbs Bend, where a bridge crossed the Green River near Campbellsville. As was his custom, Morgan demanded an unconditional surrender, but Moore, noting that this was Independence Day, replied "It is a bad day for surrender, and I would rather not." Moore's forces won the day, and Morgan, having suffered 71 casualties, decided to bypass the bridge.

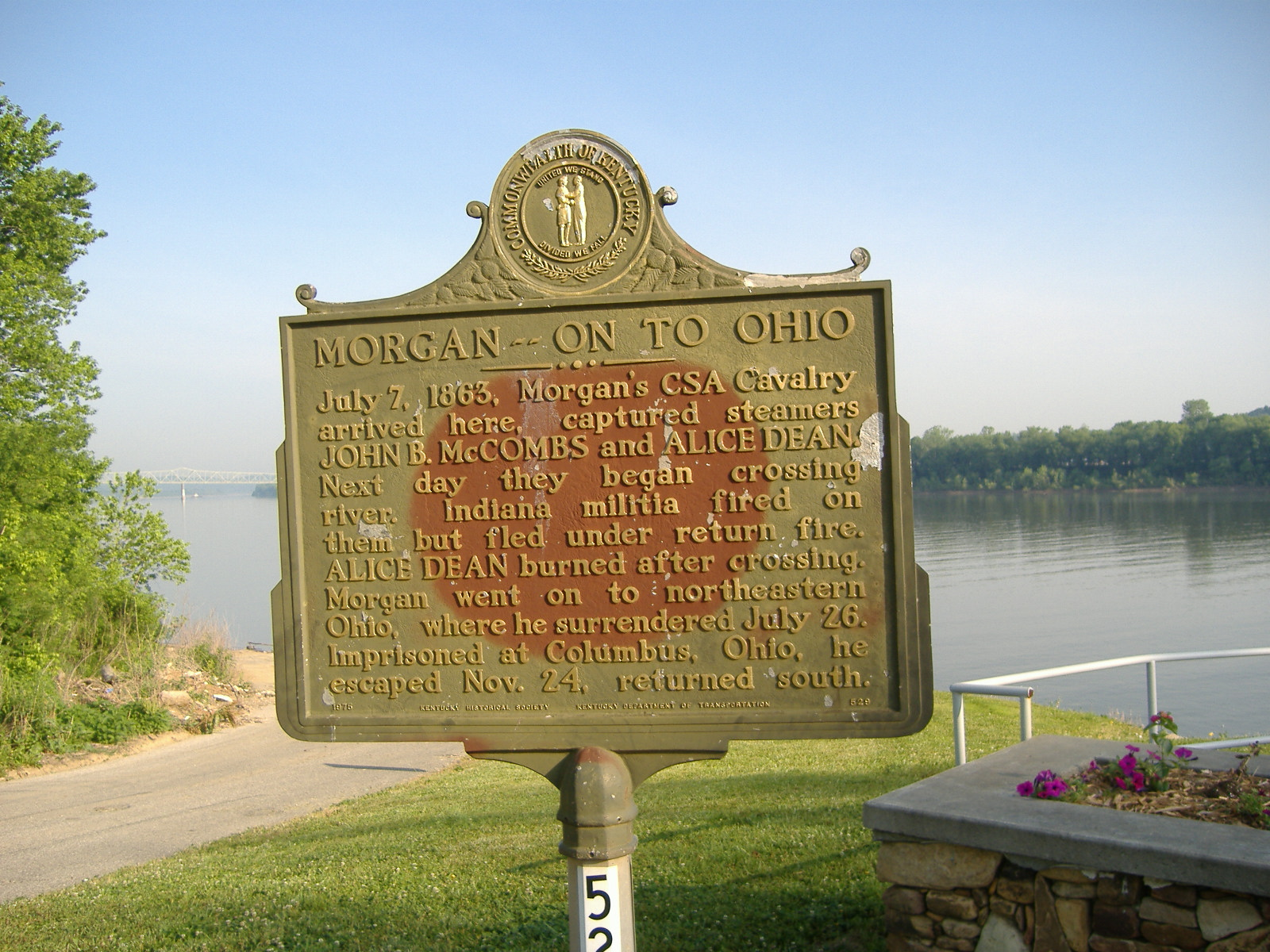
Historical marker noting Morgan's activities at Brandenburg, Kentucky, where his forces captured two steamboats, the John B. McCombs and the Alice Dean, before crossing the Ohio River into Indiana

Morgan again encountered resistance at Lebanon where, despite the Confederate victory, his nineteen-year-old brother Tom was killed. From Lebanon, Morgan's men made haste through Springfield toward Bardstown, where they learned that Union soldiers were less than a day behind, and that Louisville was already bracing for another attack. Morgan had the advantage of surprise, however, having selected Brandenburg as his target instead. He sent an advance detachment to make preparations for crossing the Ohio, and on July 7, they captured two steamboats, the John B. McCombs and the Alice Dean. By midnight, all of Morgan's men were on Indiana soil.

Over the next few weeks, Morgan rode along the course of the Ohio River, raiding Indiana and Ohio. On July 19, Federal forces captured Duke and 700 of Morgan's men, but Morgan escaped with 1,100 others. Union pursuit was heavy, and Morgan lost exhausted men daily, his command dwindling to 363 men by the time he surrendered on July 26, 1863.

Morgan was taken to a penitentiary in Columbus, Ohio, but escaped with several of his officers in November 1863. Despite the threat of a court martial from Bragg for disobeying orders, the Confederacy so desperately needed leaders that Morgan was restored to his command position.

== Forrest raids Paducah ==
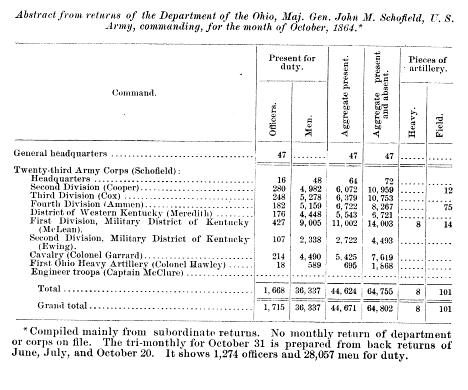
Abstract of the Returns of the XXIII Corps, Department of the Ohio, responsible for the Military District of Kentucky (1st and 2nd Divisions), and the District of Western Kentucky

Following Morgan's capture in the summer of 1863, there were no major engagements fought in Kentucky until spring of 1864. Portions of three infantry regiments from Bragg's army had requested to reorganize as a mounted infantry under Abraham Buford, but the Confederacy had no horses to supply them. In response, Nathan Bedford Forrest, who had been operating in Mississippi, began to organize a raid on western Tennessee and Kentucky. Besides obtaining mounts for the mounted-infantry-to-be, Forrest intended to disrupt Union supply lines, obtain general provisions for Confederate forces, and discourage enlistment of blacks in Kentucky into the Union army.

On March 25, 1864, Forrest commenced his attack. He met Colonel Stephen G. Hicks at Fort Anderson and demanded an unconditional surrender. Knowing that Forrest's main objectives were to obtain supplies and horses, Hicks declined. For the most part, Hicks was right in his assumption that Forrest would not assault the fort, but Confederate colonel Albert P. Thompson, a native of the area, did briefly attempt to capture it before being killed with 24 men from his unit. Forrest held the city for ten hours, destroying the Union headquarters, as well as the buildings housing the quartermaster and commissary. Forrest also captured a total of 200 horses and mules before withdrawing to Mayfield. Following the raid, Forrest granted furlough to the Kentuckians under his command so they could secure better clothing and mounts. As agreed, every man reported back to Trenton, Tennessee, on April 4.

Unionist newspapers bragged after the raid that Union forces had hidden the best horses in the area and that Forrest had only captured horses stolen from private citizens. Furious, Forrest ordered Buford back into Kentucky. Buford's men arrived on April 14, forced Hicks back into the fort, and captured an additional 140 horses in the foundry, exactly where the newspaper reports had placed them. They then rejoined Forrest in Tennessee. The raid was not only successful in terms of gaining additional mounts, but provided a diversion for Forrest's attack on Fort Pillow, Tennessee.

== Black soldiers join Union Army ==
After U.S. Congress passed the Confiscation Acts and Lincoln issued the Emancipation Proclamation, slaves from Confederate states were able to join the Union Army. Although Kentucky slaves were not freed, many abandoned their slave master and fled. Fugitive slaves came to Louisville and Camp Nelson and were enlisted in the U. S. Colored Infantry. Approximately, 24,000 Black Kentuckians, free and enslaved, served as Union soldiers.

== 1864–1865: Military rule ==
In response to the growing problem of guerrilla campaigns throughout 1863 and 1864, in June 1864, Maj. Gen. Stephen G. Burbridge was given command over the commonwealth of Kentucky. This began an extended period of military control that would last through early 1865, beginning with martial law authorized by Lincoln. To pacify Kentucky, Burbridge rigorously suppressed disloyalty and used economic pressure as coercion. His guerrilla policy, which included public execution of four guerrillas for the death of each unarmed Union citizen, caused the most controversy. After a falling out with Governor Thomas E. Bramlette, Burbridge was dismissed in February 1865. Confederates remembered him as the "Butcher of Kentucky".

It is important to take note that due to the Emancipation Proclamation, the severity of Martial Law under Burbridge and the enlistment of Kentucky slaves into Union regiments (Kentucky had the 2nd largest African American Union enlistment only behind Louisiana) Union support among native Kentuckians greatly diminished by war's end. This is documented in Louisville by a prominent Washington, DC journalist, Whitelaw Reid, who accompanied Chief Justice Salmon P. Chase for a tour of the south from May 1, 1865, to May 1, 1866. Reid observed in 1865, "At Louisville a pleasant dinner party enabled us to meet the last collection of men from the midst of a Rebel community. At that time there was more loyalty in Nashville than in Louisville, and about as much in Charleston as in either. For the first and only time on the trip, save while we were under the Spanish flag, slaves waited on us at dinner. They were the last any of us were ever to see on American soil." This sentiment is also evident in the daily violence between Louisville citizens and the Union soldiers mustering out of the city to their home states during this period in what was known as the "war after the war" throughout the state.

== Order of battle for Union forces in Kentucky ==
- Data is from Tabular Statements Showing the Names of Commanders of Army Corps, Divisions and Brigades, United States Army, During the War of 1861 to 1865, compiled from the data on record in the office of the Quartermaster General of the Army, Gen. C. McKeever, 1887.

=== 1862–1863 ===
- The forces in Kentucky at times also included the Army of the Ohio under Maj. Gen. Don Carlos Buell, the Army of the Tennessee under Maj. Gen. Ulysses S. Grant, and the Army of the Cumberland under Maj. Gen. William Rosecrans. Part of the Army of Kentucky eventually became the Reserve Corps of the Army of the Cumberland, while the rest was rolled into the XXIII Corps in the Department of Ohio under Maj. Gen. John G. Foster.

Army of Kentucky; Maj. Gen. Gordon Granger
1st Division; Brig. Gen. A.J. Smith	2nd Division; Brig. Gen. Quincy Adams Gilmore	3rd Division; Brig. Gen. Absalom Baird
1st Brigade; Brig. Gen. Stephen Gano Burbridge	1st Brigade; Brig. Gen. G. Clay Smith	1st Brigade; Col. John Coburn
2nd Brigade; Col. William A. Landram	2nd Brigade; Col. Samuel A. Gilbert	2nd Brigade; Col. Peter T. Swain

- Granger's command also included garrisons at Lexington, Danville, Falmouth, Nicholasville, and Frankfort, Kentucky

Forces at Bowling Green, Kentucky
Brig. Gen. Mahlon D. Manson

- Manson's force consisted of what was left of the command under Maj. Gen. William "Bull" Nelson who had been defeated at the Battle of Richmond.

=== 1863–1864 ===
- The forces in Kentucky at times also included three additional brigades of the 1st division, the brigades 2nd, 3rd, and 4th divisions of the XXIII Corps which were in the field near two divisions of the IX Corps, and a part of the cavalry division of the Department of Ohio under Maj. Gen. George Stoneman.
- Curiously, the official records refer to Boyle's command as the "District of Western Kentucky", although it included all of Kentucky except Western Kentucky, which was assigned to the District of Columbus

1st Division—XXIII Corps; Created G.O. No. 103. A.G.O. April 27, 1863. Reorganized April 1864. Commander, Date Assigned; S.D. Sturgis, Brigadier General, June 1863; S.P. Carter, Brigadier General, July 10, 1863; J.T. Boyle, Brigadier General, August 6, 1863
U.S. Forces, So. Cent. Ky.—1st Division, XXIII Corps; Organized October 1863. Discontinued January 1864. Transferred to Dept. of the Ohio. Commander, Date Assigned; E.H. Hobson, Brigadier General, October 1863	U.S. Forces, Eastetern Ky.—1st Division, XXIII Corps; Organized October 1863. Discontinued January 1864. Transferred to Dept. of the Ohio. Commander, Date Assigned; G.W. Gallup, Col. 14th KY. Vols., October 1863
U.S. Forces, Somerset, Ky.—1st Division, XXIII Corps; Organized October 1863. Discontinued January 1864. Transferred to Dept. of the Ohio. Commander, Date Assigned; T.T. Garrard, Brigadier General, October 22, 1863	U.S. Forces, No. Cent. Ky—1st Division, XXIII Corps; Organized October 1863. Discontinued January 1864. Transferred to Dept. of the Ohio. Commander, Date Assigned; S.S. Fry, Brigadier General, October 1863
U.S. Forces, S.W. Cent. Ky—1st Division, XXIII Corps; Organized October 1863. Discontinued January 1864. Transferred to Dept. of the Ohio. Commander, Date Assigned; C. Maxwell, Col. 26th Ky. Vols., October 1863

District of Columbus, Ky (6th Division, XVI Corps)
Denominated 6th Division, XVI Corps, March 1863.
Changed to 3rd Division, 16th Corps, January 1864.
Commander, Date Assigned
A. Asboth, Brigadier General, January 1863
A.J. Smith, Brigadier General, August 5, 1863
1st Brigade—6th Division–XVI Corps
Organized July 14, 1863. Transferred to Cavalry Division, December 1863.
Commander, Date Assigned
Geo. E. Waring Jr., Col. 4th Mo. Cav., July & October 1863
C.H. Fox, Col. 101st Ills. Vols., August 22, 1863
J.K. Mills, Col. 24th Mo. Vols., September 3, 1863

- The District of Columbus became the District of Western Kentucky, and the troops from the XVI Corps were replaced with troops from the XXIII Corps.

=== 1864–1865 ===
- The forces in Kentucky at times also included the 1st, 2nd, 3rd and 4th divisions of the XXIII Corps, under the command of Maj. Gen. John M. Schofield, assigned to Sherman's forces for the Atlanta campaign.

5th Division, XXIII Corps or District of Kentucky; Organized April 1864. Transferred to Department of the Cumberland, January 1865. G.O. No 5, A.G. O. Commander, Date Assigned; S.G. Burbridge, Brigadier-General, April 1864
1st Division, District of Kentucky; Organized April 10, 1864. Commander, Date Assigned; E.H. Hobson, Brigadier General, April 9 & December 9, 1864; N.C. McLean, Brigadier General, July 6, 1864	2nd Division, District of Kentucky; Organized April 1864; Commander, Date Assigned; Hugh Ewing, Brigadier General, April 7, 1864
1st Brigade—1st Division–Dist. of Kentucky; Organized April 1684. Commander, Date Assigned; G.W. Gallup, Col. 14th Ky Mtd. Inf., April 13, 1864; S.B. Brown, Col. 11th Mich. Cav., May 13, 1864; E.H. Hobson, Brigadier General, July 6, 1864; C.J. True, Col. 40th Ky Vols., October 6, 1864	1st Brigade—2nd Division–Dist. of Kentucky; Organized April 1864. Commander, Date Assigned; S.D. Bruce, Col. 20th Ky. Vols., April 1684; T.B. Fairleigh, Lt. Col. 26th Ky. Vols., May 1864
2nd Brigade—1st Division–Dist. of Kentucky; Organized April 1864. Commander, Date Assigned; C.J. True, Col. 40th Ky. Mtd. Inf., April 1864; J.M. Brown, Col. 45th Ky. Mtd. Inf., July 6, 1864; F.N. Alexander, Col. 30th Ky. Vols., September 1864	2nd Brigade—2nd Division–Dist. of Kentucky; Organized April 1864. Commander, Date Assigned; C. Maxwell, Col. 26th Ky. Vols., April & September 1864; J.H. Grider, Col. 52nd Ky. Vols., July 1864; S.P. Love, Col. 11th Ky. Vols., November 1864; D.J. Dill, Col. 30th Wis. Vols., December 1864
3rd Brigade—1st Division–Dist. of Kentucky; Organized April 1864; Commander, Date Assigned; C.S. Hanson, Col. 37th Ky. Mtd. Inf., April 13, 1864; B.J. Spaulding, Lt. Col. 37th Ky. Vols., October 1864	2nd Brigade—2nd Division–Dist. of Kentucky; Organized April 1864. Commander, Date Assigned; C. Maxwell, Col. 26th Ky. Vols., April & September 1864; J.H. Grider, Col. 52nd Ky. Vols., July 1864; S.P. Love, Col. 11th Ky. Vols., November 1864; D.J. Dill, Col. 30th Wis. Vols., December 1864
4th Brigade—1st Division–Dist of Kentucky; Organized April 1864; Commander, Date Assigned; J.M. Brown, Col. 45th Ky. Mtd. Inf., April 1864; R.W. Ratliff, Col. 12th Ohio Cav, July 1864	2nd Brigade—2nd Division–Dist. of Kentucky; Organized April 1864. Commander, Date Assigned; C. Maxwell, Col. 26th Ky. Vols., April & September 1864; J.H. Grider, Col. 52nd Ky. Vols., July 1864; S.P. Love, Col. 11th Ky. Vols., November 1864; D.J. Dill, Col. 30th Wis. Vols., December 1864

District of Western Kentucky
Organized August 1864. Discontinued January 1865.
Commander, Date Assigned
E.A. Paine, Brigadier General, August 1864
S. Meredith, Brigadier-General, September 12, 1864

== See also ==
- Civil War Museum (Bardstown)
- Confederate States of America – animated map of state secession and confederacy
- History of Kentucky
- History of slavery in Kentucky
- List of American Civil War monuments in Kentucky
- List of Kentucky Union Civil War units
- List of Kentucky Confederate Civil War units
- List of Kentucky's American Civil War generals
- Timeline of Kentucky in the American Civil War
- Southern Unionist
- List of Southern Unionists

Kentucky's adjacent states in the American Civil War

- Illinois in the American Civil War
- Indiana in the American Civil War
- Missouri in the American Civil War
- Ohio in the American Civil War
- Tennessee in the American Civil War
- Virginia in the American Civil War
- West Virginia in the American Civil War

Western Theater of the American Civil War

- Louisville, Kentucky, in the American Civil War
- Lexington, Kentucky, in the American Civil War
- Timeline of Kentucky history
- Border states (American Civil War)
- Battle of Belmont
- Battle of Perryville
- Battle of Cynthiana
