= PS Alice Dean =

There have been two steamboats named Alice Dean:

- PS Alice Dean (1863), a merchant steamboat operating from Cincinnati to Memphis, Tennessee, which was captured and burned by the Confederacy during the American Civil War;
- PS Alice Dean (1864), a steamboat built to replace the above.
