= List of Kentucky's American Civil War generals =

During the American Civil War, the Commonwealth of Kentucky contributed a large number of officers, politicians, and troops to the war efforts of both the Union and Confederacy. Most notable among all of these were Abraham Lincoln, President of the United States (born near Hodgenville, Kentucky) and Jefferson Davis, President of the Confederate States (born in Fairview, Kentucky).

The following is a partial list of generals or naval officers (at or above the rank of commodore) either born in Kentucky or living in Kentucky when they joined the army or navy (or in a few cases, men who were buried in Kentucky following the war, although they did not directly serve in Kentucky units). Those given the temporary or honorary rank of brevet brigadier general, are also included in this list.

== Union ==
- Barton S. Alexander
- Robert Anderson
- James Armstrong
- Francis Preston Blair Jr.
- Jeremiah T. Boyle
- John Buford
- Napoleon Bonaparte Buford
- Stephen G. Burbridge
- Edward Canby
- Cassius M. Clay
- Joseph Alexander Cooper
- George Henry Cram
- Thomas Leonidas Crittenden
- John T. Croxton
- John Edwards
- Speed S. Fry
- Kenner Garrard
- Theophilus T. Garrard
- James Isham Gilbert
- Willis A. Gorman
- William Harrow
- Edward H. Hobson
- Joseph Holt
- James S. Jackson
- Richard W. Johnson
- William J. Landram
- Daniel W. Lindsey
- Eli Long
- John Alexander McClernand
- James W. McMillan
- Ormsby M. Mitchel
- Eli Houston Murray
- William "Bull" Nelson
- Richard James Oglesby
- John M. Palmer
- Garrett J. Pendergrast
- John Pope
- Samuel Woodson Price
- Isaac C. Pugh
- Joseph J. Reynolds
- Lovell H. Rousseau
- William P. Sanders
- James M. Shackelford
- Green Clay Smith
- Alexander M. Stout
- Joseph Pannell Taylor
- Charles Mynn Thruston
- John Blair Smith Todd
- John Durbin Ward
- William Thomas Ward
- Louis Douglass Watkins
- Walter C. Whitaker
- James Alexander Williamson
- Thomas J. Wood

== Confederate ==
- Daniel Weisiger Adams
- William Wirt Adams
- Alpheus Baker
- William Beall
- Tyree H. Bell
- John C. Breckinridge
- Simon Bolivar Buckner
- Abraham Buford
- Thomas James Churchill
- George B. Cosby
- George B. Crittenden
- Basil W. Duke
- James Fleming Fagan
- Charles W. Field
- Richard Montgomery Gano
- Samuel J. Gholson
- Randall L. Gibson
- John B. Grayson
- Roger Hanson
- James Morrison Hawes
- Benjamin Hardin Helm
- George B. Hodge
- John Bell Hood
- William Lowther Jackson
- Albert Sidney Johnston
- Joseph Horace Lewis
- Hylan B. Lyon
- James H. McBride
- Humphrey Marshall
- William T. Martin
- Samuel B. Maxey
- John Hunt Morgan
- William F. Perry
- William Preston
- William Andrew Quarles
- Jerome B. Robertson
- Joseph O. Shelby
- William Y. Slack
- Gustavus Woodson Smith
- Richard Taylor
- Lloyd Tilghman
- John Stuart Williams

== See also ==
- Kentucky in the American Civil War
