= Timeline of Kentucky in the American Civil War =

== 1861 ==
- February 9, 1861 • Seven states, having declared their secession from the Union, establish a Southern provisional government, the Confederate States of America.

=== Spring and Summer 1861 ===
- April 12, 1861 • Confederate forces attack a Federal fort outside Charleston, South Carolina, at the Battle of Fort Sumter, beginning the American Civil War.
- May 10, 1861 • Confederate engineers begin construction of Fort Donelson only twelve miles south of the Kentucky line near Dover, Tennessee.
- May 16, 1861 • Neutrality resolution adopted by Unionist-dominated legislature, though governor Beriah Magoffin was an advocate of secession.
- May 20, 1861 • Kentucky, trying to remain neutral in the American Civil War, issues a proclamation asking both sides to stay off Kentucky soil.
- May 29–31, 1861 • Delegates from 5 Jackson Purchase counties meet in Mayfield along with delegates of 12 Tennessee counties to discuss secession, but the plan is abandoned following Tennessee's secession.
- September 3, 1861• Confederates under Leonidas Polk occupied Columbus, essentially ending Kentucky's bid for neutrality.

=== Winter 1861 ===
- December 10, 1861 • Although Kentucky did not formally secede, a shadow government formed from delegates representing 68 of 110 KY counties signed an ordinance of secession at the Russellville Convention with a result that favored secession. On this date the shadow government's hopes resulted in the Confederacy accepting Kentucky as its 13th Confederate state. The Confederacy controlled more than half of Kentucky till 1862 with Bowling Green as the Confederate capital of Kentucky.

== 1862 ==
- January 10, 1862 • Union Colonel James Garfield defeats Confederate Brig. Gen. Humphrey Marshall at the Battle of Middle Creek.
- January 11, 1862 • Confederate vessels fall back during the Battle of Lucas Bend.
- January 19, 1862 • Union Brig. Gen. George H. Thomas defeats Confederate Maj. Gen. George B. Crittenden at the Battle of Mill Springs, which, following Middle Creek, ends Confederate dominance in Eastern Kentucky and opens Eastern Tennessee to possible Union invasion.
- July 17, 1862 • Confederate Colonel John Hunt Morgan defeats Union Lt. Colonel John J. Landrum at the Battle of Cynthiana, the largest action of Morgan's Summer Raid.
- September 17, 1862 • Confederate General Braxton Bragg, conducting an invasion of Kentucky from Tennessee, captures a Union garrison and transportation center in the Battle of Munfordville.
- October 8, 1862 • Confederate General Braxton Bragg's invasion of Kentucky comes to an end when his army defeats Union Maj. Gen. Don Carlos Buell at the Battle of Perryville, but then withdraws through the Cumberland Gap, leaving Eastern Kentucky in Union hands for the rest of the war.
- December 17, 1862 • General Grant issues General Order № 11, which calls for the expulsion of all Jews in his district (areas of Tennessee, Mississippi, and Kentucky)

== 1863 ==
- April 1863 • Camp Nelson established in southern Jessamine County.
- July 2, 1863 • John Hunt Morgan rides into Kentucky as part of Morgan's Raid, which departed Sparta, Tennessee on June 11.
- October 1863 • General Hugh Ewing assumes command of Louisville.

== 1864 ==
- March 25, 1864 • Confederate General Nathan Bedford Forrest raided Paducah as part of his campaign northward from Mississippi to upset the Union domination of the regions south of the Ohio river.
- April 14, 1864 • The Battle of Salyersville is fought in Magoffin County, resulting in a Federal victory in this largest skirmish fought in the county.
- April 14, 1864 • Brig. Gen. Abraham Buford revisits Paducah to capture "140 fine horses" reported by a Dover, Tennessee newspaper to have escaped Forrest's earlier raid.
- June, 1864 • Major Gen. Stephen G. Burbridge assumes military command over Kentucky.
- June 11–12, 1864 • The Battle of Cynthiana, part of Morgan's Last Raid, is fought over two days, resulting in a Federal victory on June 12, and a total rout of Morgan's forces.
