= Cesar Kaskel =

Southern Unionist and Victim of General Order No. 11

Cesar J. Kaskel
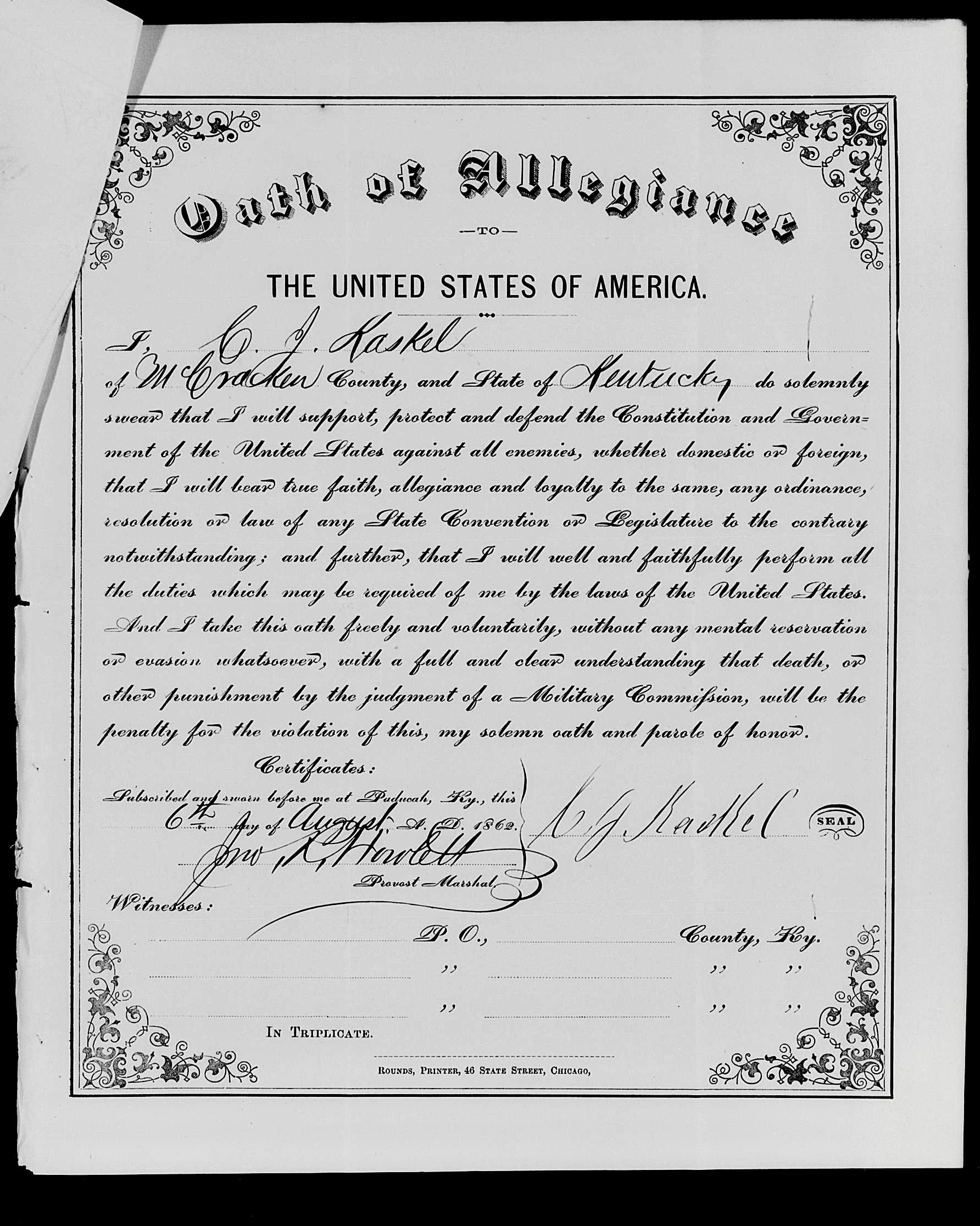
- Kaskel's signed oath of allegiance, submitted with a passport application in 1862
- Born: 1833; Rawicz, Kingdom of Prussia
- Died: Unknown
- Occupation: Businessman
- Years active: 1861–1865
- Known for: Victim of General Order No. 11 (1862) and successful lobbying to reprimand the order

Cesar J. Kaskel (1833 – ?) was a Prussian-born Southern Unionist during the American Civil War.

Kaskel was a staunch supporter of the Union, serving as vice-president of the unionist Paducah Union League Club. Despite his outspoken loyalty to the United States, Kaskel and thirty Jewish families were forcibly expelled from Paducah, Kentucky in 1862 under General Order No. 11.

Deported from Paducah, Kaskel embarked on a press campaign against the order. Described as a "Paul Revere-like ride to Washington" by historian Jonathan Sarna, the deportation was widely condemned. Kaskel successfully met with President Abraham Lincoln to protest the order, which Lincoln remanded on January 4, 1863.

== Civil War ==
=== Arriving in Kentucky ===
Kaskel immigrated to Paducah, Kentucky, in 1858. Kaskel opened a business in partnership with one Solomon Greenbaum, which struggled due to the Union blockade of Southern industry throughout the war. Despite his floundering business, Kaskel sided with the Union, and his brother Julius served in the Union Army.

=== General Order No. 11 ===
Enraged by wartime cotton smuggling, Major-General Ulysses S. Grant scapegoated Jewish merchants for the cotton black market. Grant ordered the mass deportation of Jews on December 17, 1862, from the Department of Tennessee, which included Paducah.

Captain L. J. Waddell sent Kaskel personal notice of Grant's orders and demanded Kaskel leave the city.

OFFICE OF PROVOST MARSHAL

Paducah, Ky., December 28, 1862

C.J. Kaskel— Sir: In pursuance of General Order No 11, issued from General Grant's headquarters, you are hereby ordered to leave the city of Paducah, Kentucky, within twenty-four hours after receiving this order. By order,

L.J. WADDELL,

Captain and Provost Marshal

=== Meeting with Lincoln ===
Kaskel fled Kentucky on the steamship Charley Bowen, making stops in Cairo, Illinois and Cincinnati, Ohio, while his story was picked up by the Associated Press. With support from the local Jewish community, Kaskel met with Ohio congressman John A. Gurley, who took Kaskel to meet with President Lincoln.

After their meeting, Lincoln ordered General-in-Chief of the Armies Henry Halleck to remand the order. Halleck wrote to Grant, "If such an order has been issued, it will be immediately revoked."
