= PS Alice Dean (1864) =

Packet steamer

History
- Name: Alice Dean
- Operator: James H. Pepper, Charles A Dravo, C. Dan Conway
- Route: Cincinnati to Memphis
- Launched: 1864
- Out of service: 1872
- Fate: Retired

General characteristics
- Class & type: Packet steamer
- Tonnage: 395

The second PS Alice Dean was built in Cincinnati in 1864. Built to replace the original, it was a smaller boat than the original, at 395 tons. It also ran a route between Cincinnati and Memphis. The second Alice Dean made her maiden trip from Cincinnati on February 25, 1864, with the same captain, James H. Pepper. "Commodore" Thompson Dean was aboard for the occasion, as well as other noteworthy gentlemen. On March 25, 1864, she hit bank ten miles below Cincinnati on a down-bound trip and sank with her stern in 12 feet of water. She was on her third trip. The Jennie Hubbs and Lady Pike took off her freight, and her passengers boarded the ship Kate Cassel. It was later successfully raised.

In March 1865 Captain Charles A Dravo became the ship's master. In late December 1865 she hit the suspension bridge at Cincinnati and tore down both stacks. In December 1869 about 40 miles above Memphis she hit a log and would have sunk save for a cargo of cotton which buoyed her up until the Thompson Dean came along to assist.

In 1866 the new captain was C. Dan Conway, with William Dunlop as clerk. Rounding out from Cincinnati on April 26, 1870, there was a mistake in signals between pilot and engineer. She hit the Covington, Kentucky pier of the suspension bridge and again knocked down both stacks. The Robert Burns took her passengers to Memphis. She was retired in 1872. The machinery went to the Thompson Sherlock and the hull was used as a wharfboat at Lake Providence, Louisiana, with the upper work still intact until a gale blew off the cabin in August 1865.

== See also ==
- PS Alice Dean (1863)
