= PS Alice Dean (1863) =

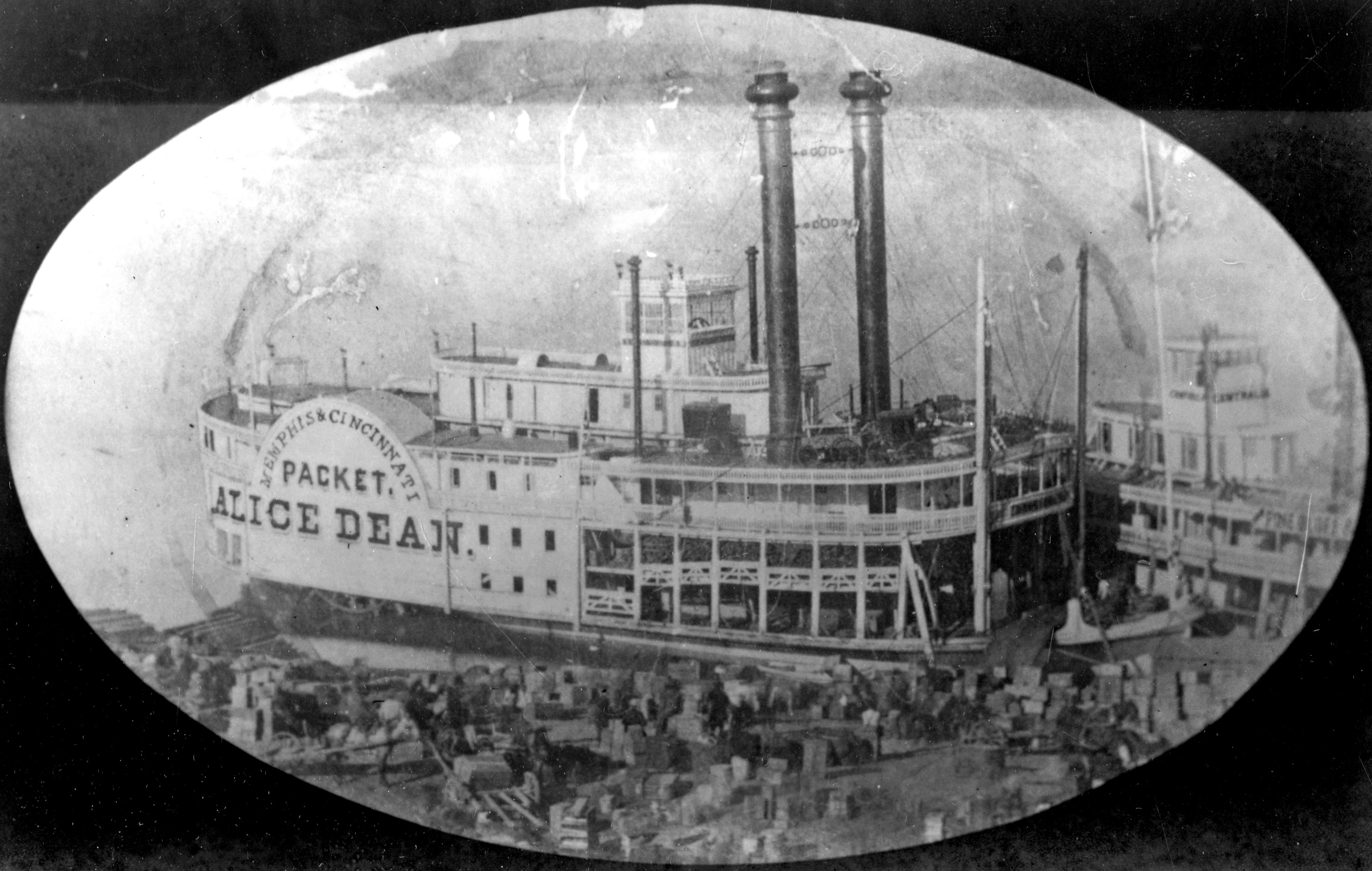
- Alice Dean. Sources differ as to whether this is a photograph of the original Alice Dean or her 1864 replacement.
- Name: Alice Dean
- Owner: Commodore Thompson Dean
- Operator: James H. Pepper
- Port of registry: Cincinnati Sanitation Commission
- Route: Cincinnati to Memphis
- Ordered: Commodore Thompson Dean
- Builder: Sam Hambleton
- Cost: $60,000
- Yard number: Cincinnati Shipyards
- Laid down: Scuttled July 9, 1863
- Launched: 1863
- Christened: Alice Dean
- Completed: March 1863
- Maiden voyage: March 1863
- In service: 4 months
- Fate: Burned
- Notes: This Naval and landbattle has been expurgated from The records of Morgan's Raid

General characteristics
- Class & type: Woodenhull sidewheelSanitary Packet steamer
- Tonnage: 880
- Length: 182 feet
- Decks: 4
- Propulsion: Side-wheel

PS Alice Dean, which had a capacity of 880 tons, was a side-wheel, wooden-hulled packet steamer. It was launched from Cincinnati, Ohio, United States, in 1863, running a scheduled route between Cincinnati and Memphis, Tennessee. Its captain was James H. Pepper.

In June 1863 the Alice Dean served as a Union troop transport, carrying Federal forces from Memphis to join General Ulysses Grant's siege of Vicksburg. In July of that year, Confederate Brigadier General John Hunt Morgan and his cavalry undertook a large scale raid from Tennessee through Kentucky and then across Indiana and Ohio. While crossing the Ohio River into Indiana at Brandenburg, Kentucky, the raiders captured the Alice Dean. Using the Alice Dean as a ferry, Morgan's troops were transported to Morvin's Landing, near Mauckport, Indiana. Morgan's Raiders had already appropriated a small packet named John T. McCombs and used her as a decoy to hail down and capture the Alice Dean. After using the two boats for their purposes, Morgan's men burned the Alice Dean. The McCombs was spared because its owner/captain was a friend of Morgan's second-in-command, Basil W. Duke. The machinery was salvaged in the fall of 1863 and auctioned off to the C.T. Dumont Co. for $4,500. Part of the Alice Dean is on display at the Battle of Corydon battlefield.

A towboat accident at Leavenworth, Indiana in August 1959 caused the water of the Ohio River to drop five feet, which exposed the hull of the Alice Dean. Local history buff took pieces of wood as plaques to commemorate the raid.

In 1965 the Heth Civic Club took up a collection and bribed a local contractor to move his crane to the site of the Alice Dean in an attempt to recover the ship. The ship was disturbed and several truck loads of wood were recovered. There is a rare video of the expedition.

Associated with this affair was "Sherman's Ride," in which a self-appointed Paul Revere, Jacob Sherman, mounted a horse and galloped upriver to head off the down-bound Grey Eagle to prevent her from falling into the hands of Morgan. He succeeded. The grateful owners of the Grey Eagle presented a bell to the citizens of Mauckport in appreciation, and it still is there.

Following the loss of Alice Dean, a second steamboat with the same name was built to replace her.

== See also ==
- PS Alice Dean (1864)
