= General Order No. 11 (1862) =

1862 Union army order expelling Jews

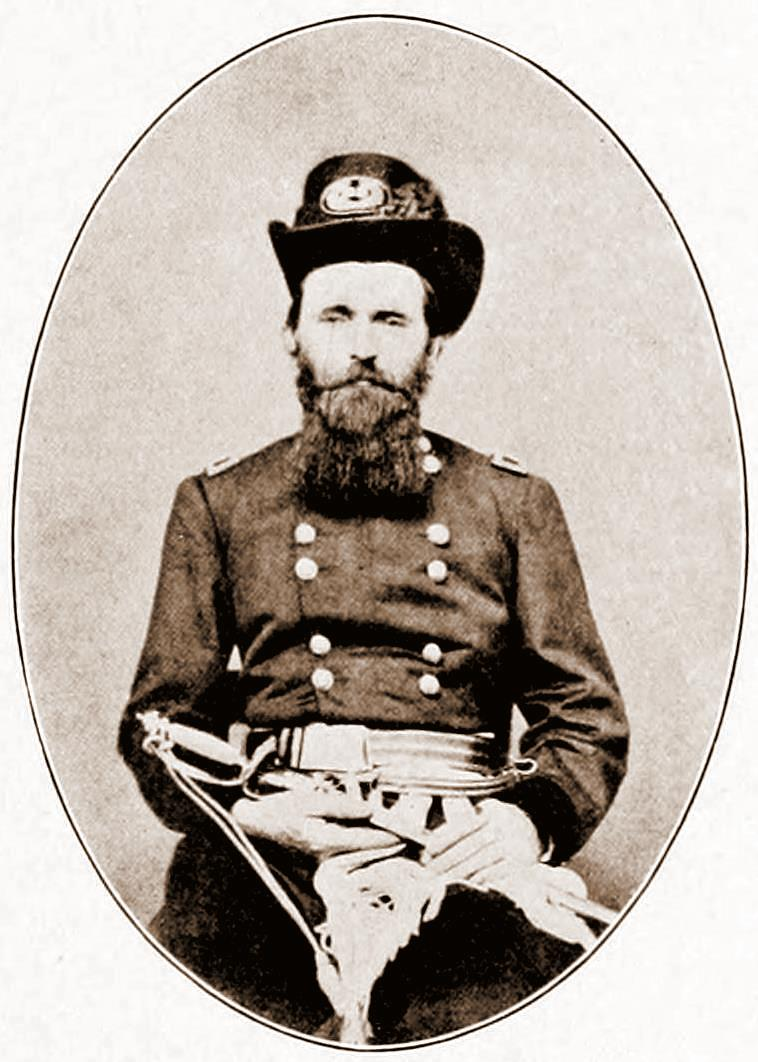
Grant in 1861

General Order No. 11 was a Union army order issued by Major General Ulysses S. Grant on December 17, 1862, during the Vicksburg campaign of the American Civil War. The order expelled all Jews from Grant's military district, comprising areas of Tennessee, Mississippi, and Kentucky. Grant issued the order in an effort to reduce corruption among Union soldiers and stop the illicit trade in Southern-produced cotton, which he perceived as being run "mostly by Jews and other unprincipled traders". During the war, the Lincoln administration had authorized licensed traders to do business with the Union army, which created a market for unlicensed ones. Union army commanders in the South were responsible for administering the trade licenses and trying to control the black market in Southern cotton, in addition to their regular military duties.

At Holly Springs, Mississippi, the supply depot of Grant's troops, Jews were rounded up and forced to leave the city on foot. On December 20, 1862, three days after Grant's order, Confederate States Army troops led by Major General Earl Van Dorn sprang the Holly Springs Raid, which prevented the potential expulsion of more Jews. Although delayed by Van Dorn's raid, Grant's order was fully implemented in Paducah, Kentucky, where thirty Jewish families were forcibly expelled from the city.

Jewish community leaders protested, and there was an outcry against the order from newspaper editors and members of the United States Congress. President Abraham Lincoln responded by countermanding the order on January 4, 1863. Grant later claimed, during his 1868 presidential campaign, that he had not issued the order due to antisemitism on his part, but rather as a way to address a problem that "certain Jews had caused". Nevertheless, he expressed regret for his decision. Historians and Grant biographers have generally been critical of the order.

== Background ==
=== Military operations ===
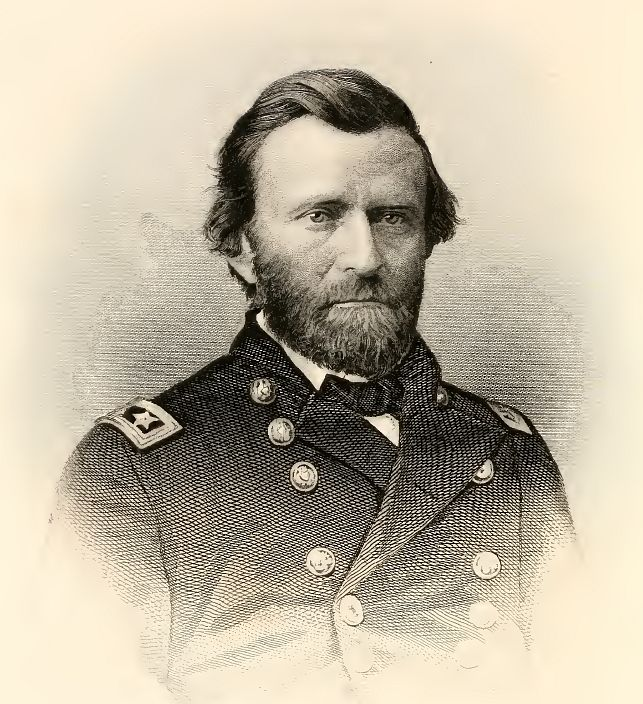
General Ulysses S. Grant

On November 2, 1862, Union Major General Ulysses S. Grant, launched the aggressive Vicksburg Campaign to take the Confederate citadel of Vicksburg, Mississippi. On November 13, Grant's cavalry had advanced on and captured Holly Springs, Mississippi, and set up an advanced supply station. On December 1, Grant's cavalry continued to move South, crossed the Tallahatchie River, and captured Oxford, Mississippi. On December 8, Grant informed Henry Halleck, his commanding general, of his military convergence plan to advance on Vicksburg overland, while Union Major General William T. Sherman would advance on Vicksburg from the Mississippi River. The Confederate commander of Vicksburg was General John C. Pemberton, who was stationed at Jackson, Mississippi, which was 45 miles (72 km) from Vicksburg. Grant's own Union military advance was made vulnerable to Confederate attack by a 190-mile (310 km) railroad supply line.

Grant's plan to capture Vicksburg by a joint venture with Sherman was thwarted by two Confederate raids. On December 10, 1862, breaking from Confederate General Braxton Bragg's Army, Confederate General Nathan Bedford Forrest began a series of raids that disrupted Union positions. Forrest destroyed Grant's rail and telegraphic communications, and inflicted 1,500 casualties on the Union army. Grant's northern communications were cut off from Jackson, Tennessee to Columbus, Kentucky. On December 20, Confederate General Earl Van Dorn led the Holly Springs Raid on the Union supply station at Holly Springs, Mississippi, destroying "shops, depots, and warehouses." Grant was defeated, extended into enemy territory, and forced to withdraw to Tennessee, his army foraging the land. On December 29, Sherman's assault on Vicksburg at Chickasaw Bayou was repulsed by Pemberton.

=== Refugee cotton labor ===
While Grant prepared to attack Pemberton's Confederate army, his army was flooded by fugitive slaves, considered contrabands by the federal government. In early November, Grant initiated a labor camp system where former refugee slaves would pick cotton, shipped north, to aid the Union War effort. Grant ordered Chaplain John Eaton to take charge of the contrabands. In return the black refugees would be protected by the army and the profits from the sale of cotton would be given to the black workers to "compensate for food, clothing, and shelter." Grant believed the labor camp system would "make the Negro a consciously self-supporting unit...and start him on the way to self-respecting citizenship." In November 1862, the first labor camp was established at Grand Junction. The Lincoln administration authorized Grant's program five days later. In December, Eaton was appointed by Grant to be superintendent of contrabands. African American common-law marriages were legalized. On January 1, 1863, President Lincoln issued the Emancipation Proclamation, that expanded the war, to end slavery in the rebelling states.

=== Cotton, illegal trade, smuggling ===
While Grant's Army marched deeper into the Confederate South, enemy territory, as far as Oxford, Mississippi, northern traders followed, to profiteer in the cotton trade, driven by the North's "consuming need" for the highly sought after product, used to make Union tents. The Union naval blockade forced Southern cotton planters to find alternatives to exporting their product. Extensive cotton trade continued between the North and South. Northern textile mills in New York and New England were dependent on Southern cotton, while Southern plantation owners depended on the trade with the North for their economic survival. The U.S. Government permitted limited trade, licensed by the Treasury and the U.S. Army. Corruption flourished as unlicensed traders bribed Army officers to allow them to buy Southern cotton without a permit. Jewish traders were among those involved in the cotton trade; some merchants had been active in the cotton business for generations in the South; others were more recent immigrants to the North.

Grant received contradictory information from Washington. The Treasury Department wanted to restore trade with the South, while the War Department believed profiteering from the sale of cotton aided the Confederacy and prolonged the war. Traders were allowed permits as long as the traders did not cross into Confederate held territory. Grant found this difficult to enforce, while he tried to stop cotton traders, including Jewish traders, from moving south with his army.

The practice of cotton smuggling infuriated Grant. Criticism of Jewish traders spread throughout the Union army, although non-Jewish traders' involvement with illicit trade was rampant. Jewish traders were singled out and called "sharks" who fed upon soldiers. As part of his command, Grant was responsible for issuing trade licenses in the Department of Tennessee, an administrative district of the Union army that comprised the portions of Kentucky and Tennessee west of the Tennessee River, and Union-controlled areas of northern Mississippi. Grant resented having to deal with the distraction of the cotton trade. He perceived it as having endemic corruption: the highly lucrative trade resulted in a system where "every colonel, captain or quartermaster ... [was] in a secret partnership with some operator in cotton." He issued a number of directives aimed at black marketeers.

=== Escalating hostility ===
On November 9, 1862, Grant sent an order to Major General Stephen A. Hurlbut: "Refuse all permits to come south of Jackson for the present. The Israelites especially should be kept out." The following day he instructed Colonel Joseph Dana Webster: "Give orders to all the conductors on the [rail]road that no Jews are to be permitted to travel on the railroad southward from any point. They may go north and be encouraged in it; but they are such an intolerable nuisance that the department must be purged of them." In a letter to General William Tecumseh Sherman, Grant wrote that his policy was occasioned "in consequence of the total disregard and evasion of orders by Jews."

Grant explained his anti-Jewish policy to the War Department. Grant said that Treasury Department regulations were violated: "mostly by Jews and other unprincipled traders". In reference to Jewish traders Grant said: "they come in with their carpet sacks in spite of all that can be done to prevent it. The Jews seem to be a privileged class that can travel anywhere. They will land at any wood yard or landing on the river and make their way through the country. If not permitted to buy cotton themselves they will act as agents for someone else who will be at a military post with a Treasury permit to receive cotton and pay for it in Treasury notes, which the Jew will buy up at an agreed rate, paying gold." Grant proposed that the federal government "to buy all the cotton at a fixed rate and send it to Cairo, St. Louis or some other point to be sold. Then all traders—they are a curse to the Army—might be expelled."

Grant and the cotton trade took on a more personal tone when his father Jesse Grant, and the Mack brothers, Jewish clothing contractors, visited Grant at his Southern base of Oxford. Jesse and Grant got along well with each other for a couple of days. Grant also treated his Jewish guests respectfully. The Mack brothers needed cotton to make Union army uniforms. Jesse Grant had been promised by the Mack brothers to receive a quarter of the profits, after Jesse had gotten his son Ulysses to bestow permits to buy cotton, which would then be shipped to New York. When Grant found out about the business agreement between Jesse and the Mack brothers, he was livid. Grant abruptly sent Jesse and the Mack brothers packing north on the next train. Grant may have felt betrayed to find out that his own father was involved in the cotton trade that he despised.

At the start of December 1862, Grant focused on Jewish traders as the primary cause of smuggling. On December 5, Grant told Sherman that "in consequence of the total disregard and evasion of orders by the Jews my policy is to exclude them so far as practicable from the Dept." Grant tightened restrictions to try to reduce the illegal trade. On December 8, 1862, he issued General Order No. 2, mandating that "cotton-speculators, Jews and other Vagrants having not honest means of support, except trading upon the miseries of their Country ... will leave in twenty-four hours or they will be sent to duty in the trenches." As the days went by, Grant's anger mounted. Grant was not satisfied only with punishing Jewish traders, he desired to expel all Jewish people from his district.

== Issue of the order ==
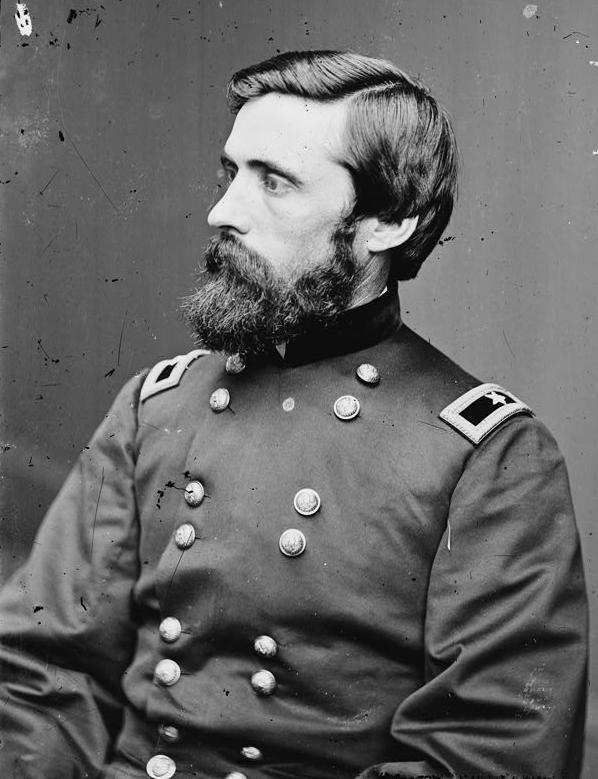
Grant's Asst. Adjt. Gen. John Rawlins strongly objected to issuing General Orders No. 11.

On December 17, 1862, Grant was angered when he had received complaints by mail concerning Jewish traders in his department. The same hour, Grant issued General Order No. 11, expelling "Jews, as a class" to strengthen his earlier prohibition. Jewish persons who did not obey the order were to be arrested and forcibly removed as prisoners. John Rawlins, Grant's lawyer and Asst. Adjt. Gen., strongly warned Grant not to issue the order. Grant refused to take Rawlin's advice concerning the order and told him: "Well, they can countermand this from Washington if they like, but we will issue it anyhow."

=== Text ===
General Orders No. 11

_______

Head Quarters 13th Army Corps,
Department of the Tennessee,
Oxford, Miss. Dec. 17, 1862.

I.. The Jews, as a class, violating every regulation of trade
established by the Treasury Department, and also Department
orders, are hereby expelled from the Department.

II.. Within twenty-four hours from the receipt of this order
by Post Commanders, they will see that all of this class of people
be furnished passes and required to leave, and any one re-
turning after such notification will be arrested and held in con-
finement until an opportunity occurs of sending them out as pris-
oners, unless furnished with permit from Head Quarters.

III.. No permits will be given these people to visit Head
Quarters for the purpose of making personal application for
trade permits.

By Order of Maj. Genl. U.S. Grant
JNO. A. RAWLINS
Ass't Adj't Genl.

=== Letter to Wolcott ===
In a letter of the same date sent to Christopher Wolcott, the United States Assistant Secretary of War, Grant explained his reasoning:

To Chistopher P. Wolcott

_______

Head Quarters, 13th Army Corps.
Department of the Tennessee
Oxford, Dec. 17th 1862

HON. C.P. WOLCOTT
ASST. SECTY OF WAR
WASHINGTON, D.C.

Sir:
I have long since believed that in spite of all the vigilance that
can be infused into Post Commanders, that the Specie regulations
of the Treasury Dept. have been violated, and that mostly by
Jews and other unprincipled traders. So well satisfied of this have
I been at this that I instructed the Commdg Officer at Columbus to re-
fuse all permits to Jews to come south, and frequently have had
them expelled from the Dept. But they come in with their Carpet
sacks in spite of all that can be done to prevent it. The Jews seem
to be a privileged class that can travel any where. They will land
at any wood yard or landing on the river and make their way
through the country. If not permitted to buy Cotton themselves
they will act as agents for someone else who will be at a Military
post, with a Treasury permit to receive Cotton and pay for it in
Treasury notes which the Jew will buy up at an agreed rate,
paying gold.

There is but one way that I know of to reach this case. That
is for Government to buy all the Cotton at a fixed rate and send
it to Cairo, St Louis, or some other point to be sold. Then all
traders, they are a curse to the Army, might be expelled.

I am, Sir, Very Respectfully
Your Obt Servant
U.S. Grant
Maj Genl.

== Enforcement ==
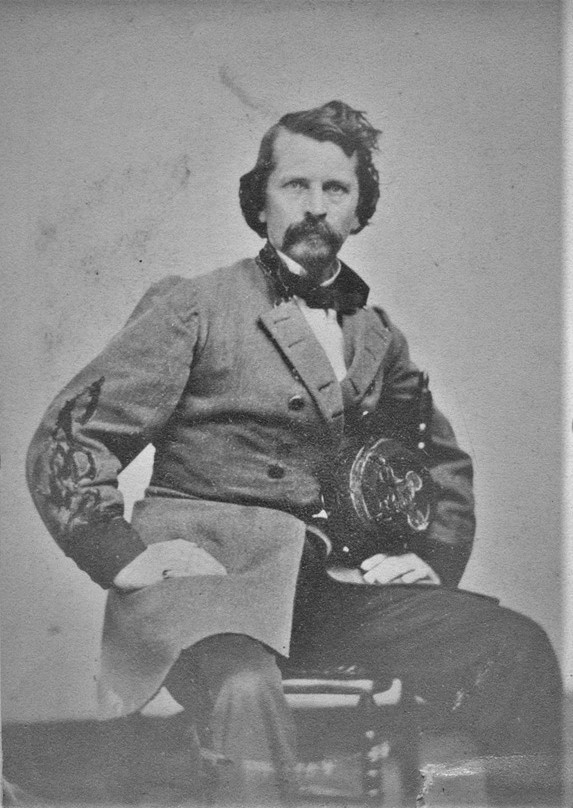
Confederate Major General Earl Van Dorn. Van Dorn's December 20, 1862 Holly Springs Raid, Grant's Union supply depot, spared many Jewish people from potentially being expelled from Grant's military district.

Immediately after the order was issued, Jews at Holly Springs, Mississippi, Grant's supply depot, were rounded up and forcibly removed. Some Jewish traders were forced to evacuate the area 40 miles (64 km) on foot. Seventy-two hours after Grant's order was issued, Holly Springs was raided by Confederate Major General Earl Van Dorn and his army of 3500 Confederate troops. Union communication lines were broken for weeks, which resulted in many other Jews being spared from potential removal, and delayed full enforcement of Grant's order.

On December 28, Grant's order was fully enforced at Paducah. Thirty Jewish families, shell-shocked and roughly treated, were ordered to leave Paducah within twenty-four hours. Jewish families in Paducah were forced to collect their personal belongings, shutter their homes and shops, and board a steamer on the Ohio River. One Jewish resident of Paducah, Cesar Kaskel, a Union loyalist and president of the Paducah Union League Club, was summoned to Paducah's provost marshal, L. J. Waddell, who ordered him to leave the city.

=== Jewish resistance ===
A group of Jewish merchants who were expelled from Paducah, led by Cesar Kaskel, sent a telegram to President Lincoln, in which they condemned Grant's General Order No. 11 as "the grossest violation of the Constitution and our rights as good citizens under it". The telegram noted it would "place us ... as outlaws before the world. We respectfully ask your immediate attention to this enormous outrage on all law and humanity ..." Throughout the Union, Jewish groups protested and sent telegrams to the government in Washington, D.C.

Kaskel led a delegation to Washington, D.C., arriving on January 3, 1863. In Washington, he conferred with Jewish Republican Adolphus Solomons and a Cincinnati congressman, John A. Gurley. After meeting with Gurley, he went directly to the White House. Lincoln received the delegation and studied Kaskel's copies of General Order No. 11 and the specific order expelling Kaskel from Paducah. The President told General-in-Chief Henry Halleck to have Grant revoke General Order No. 11, which Halleck did in the following message: "A paper purporting to be General Orders, No. 11, issued by you December 17, has been presented here. By its terms, it expells [sic] all Jews from your department. If such an order has been issued, it will be immediately revoked."

One Jewish officer, Captain Philip Trounstine, of the 1st Ohio Cavalry Regiment, stationed in Moscow, Tennessee, resigned in protest, and Captain John C. Kelton, the assistant adjutant general of the Department of Missouri, wrote to Grant to note his order included all Jews, rather than focusing on "certain obnoxious individuals", and noted that many Jews served in the Union army. Grant formally rescinded the order, January 17, 1863, within three weeks after Lincoln revoked the order.

=== Political response ===
The issue attracted significant attention in Congress and from the press. The Democrats condemned the order as part of what they saw as the US Government's systematic violation of civil liberties. The Democrats moved to censure Grant in the Republican-dominated Senate; the motion failed by a vote of 30–7. Illinois congressman, and Grant supporter, Elihu Washburne, narrowly defeated a motion to censure Grant in the House by 56 votes to 53 votes. Some newspapers supported Grant's action; the Washington Chronicle criticized Jews as "scavengers ... of commerce". Most, however, were strongly opposed, with The New York Times denouncing the order as "humiliating" and a "revival of the spirit of the medieval ages." Its editorial column called for the "utter reprobation" of Grant's order.

One of Halleck's staff officers privately explained to Grant that the problem lay with the excessive scope of the order: "Had the word 'pedlar' been inserted after Jew I do not suppose any exception would have been taken to the order." According to Halleck, Lincoln had "no objection to [his] expelling traitors and Jew peddlers, which I suppose, was the object of your order; but as in terms proscribing an entire religious class, some of whom are fighting in our ranks, the President deemed it necessary to revoke it." The Republican politician Elihu B. Washburne defended Grant in similar terms. Grant's subordinates expressed concern about the order.

On January 6, Isaac Mayer Wise of Cincinnati, rabbi and leader of the Reform Judaism movement, led a delegation that met with Lincoln to express gratitude for his support. Lincoln said he was surprised that Grant had issued such a command and said, "to condemn a class is, to say the least, to wrong the good with the bad." Lincoln said he drew no distinction between Jew and Gentile and would allow no American to be wronged due to their religious affiliation.

== Post-war repercussions ==
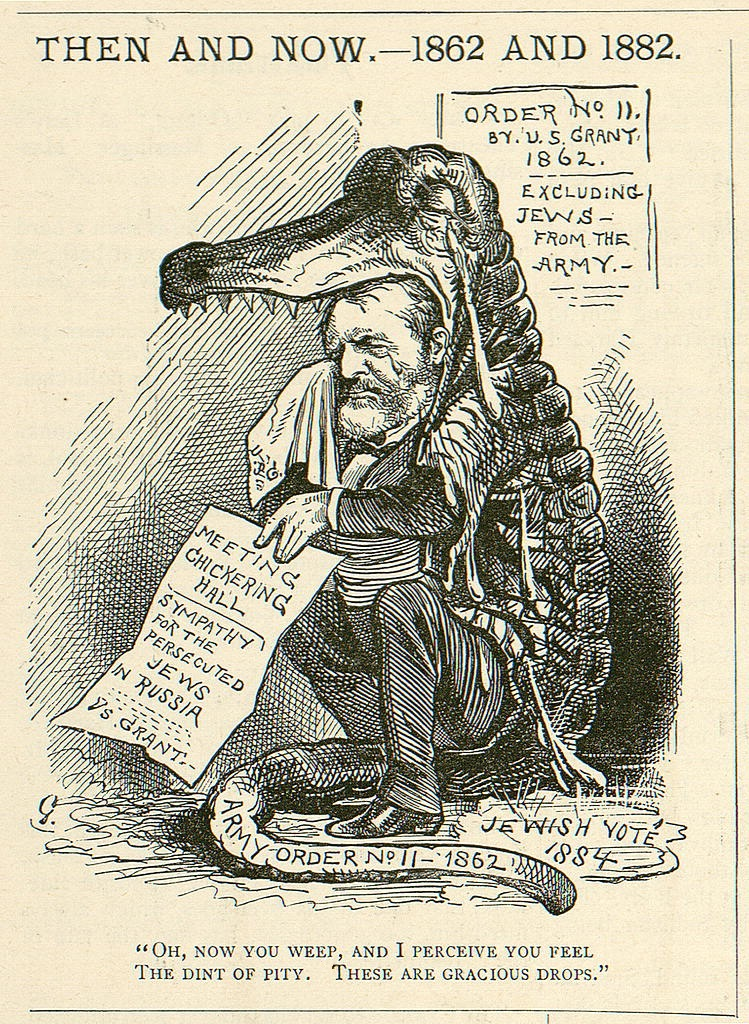
A cartoon by Bernhard Gillam depicting Grant courting Jewish voters in 1882 by crying "crocodile tears" over the persecution of Jews in Russia. The cartoon contrasts Grant's expressions of outrage with his own earlier actions.

=== Repudiation of order ===
After the Civil War, General Order No. 11 became an issue in the presidential election of 1868 in which Grant ran as the Republican candidate. The Democrats raised the order as an issue, with the prominent Democrat and rabbi Isaac Mayer Wise urging fellow Jews to vote against Grant because of his antisemitism. Grant sought to distance himself from the order, saying "I have no prejudice against sect or race, but want each individual to be judged by his own merit." He repudiated the controversial order, asserting it had been drafted by a subordinate and that he had signed it without reading, in the press of warfare. In September 1868, Grant wrote in reply to Isaac N. Morris, a correspondent:

I do not pretend to sustain the order. At the time of its publication, I was incensed by a reprimand received from Washington for permitting acts which Jews within my lines were engaged in. ... The order was issued and sent without any reflection and without thinking of the Jews as a set or race to themselves, but simply as persons who had successfully ... violated an order. ... I have no prejudice against sect or race, but want each individual to be judged by his own merit.

The episode did not cause much long-term damage to Grant's relationship with the American Jewish community. He won the presidential election, taking the majority of the Jewish vote.

=== Reconciliation ===
In his book When General Grant Expelled the Jews (2012) historian Jonathan Sarna maintains that as president Grant became one of the greatest friends of Jews in American history. When he was president, he appointed more Jews to office than any previous president. He condemned atrocities against Jews in Europe, putting human rights on the American diplomatic agenda.

In 1874, President Grant attended a dedication of the Adas Israel Congregation in Washington with all the members of his Cabinet. This was the first time an American President attended a synagogue service. Many historians have taken his action as part of his continuing effort to reconcile with the Jewish community.

Grant has been estimated to have appointed more than fifty Jewish people to federal office including consuls, district attorneys, and deputy postmasters. Grant appointed Jewish citizen Simon Wolf Washington, D.C., recorder of deeds. Grant appointed Jewish citizen Edward S. Salomon territorial governor of Washington, the first time an American Jew occupied a governor's seat. Rabbi Isaac Mayer Wise said "Grant has revoked Grant's notorious order No. 11."

== Historical views and assessments ==
Historians have generally been critical of Grant and his General Order No. 11. Scholars have offered unique perspectives of Grant's controversial order, at a time when the Civil War had taken on a different nature.

In 1951, historian Bertram Korn said Grant's General Order No. 11 order was part of a pattern by Grant. "This was not the first discriminatory order [Grant] had signed ... he was firmly convinced of the Jews' guilt and was eager to use any means of ridding himself of them."

In 1981, historian William S. McFeely said: "Grant was fed up with the cotton speculators and the greedy suppliers of goods to his armies, but rather than attack the entire voracious horde, which included an astonishing number of entrepreneurs—Among them Charles A. Dana and Roscoe Conkling, for example—Grant singled out the Jews. The ancient stereotype of the grasping trader was invoked; once again a frustrated man chose the age-old scapegoat." McFeely mentioned General James H. Wilson who served under Grant. Wilson said Grant's General Order No. 11 was related to Grant's difficulties with his own father, Jesse Root Grant. Wilson recounted, "He [Jesse Grant] was close and greedy. He came down into Tennessee with a Jew trader that he wanted his son to help, and with whom he was going to share the profits. Grant refused to issue a permit and sent the Jew flying, prohibiting Jews from entering the line." Wilson felt that Grant could not deal with the "lot of relatives who were always trying to use him" and perhaps attacked those he saw as their counterpart: opportunistic traders who were Jewish.

In 2001, historian Jean Edward Smith said: "December 1862 was the low point of Grant's Civil War career. In addition to his own and Sherman's aborted attempts to take Vicksburg, on December 17, Grant issued an order that would stain his reputation forever. In one of the most blatant examples of state-sponsored anti-Semitism in American history, Grant expelled all members of the Jewish faith from the Department of the Tennessee."

In 2012, historian H.W. Brands said: "Grant shared the penchant for stereotyping Jews common to the age in America, and he may well have concluded that whatever loss they suffered by being treated as a group was a burden they would have to bear. If the inconvenience of this comparatively small class was the price of winning the war, he was willing to make them pay it. He demanded far more of his soldiers every day."

In 2016, historian Ronald C. White said: "Although non-Jews participated widely in illegal trading, the military newspaper in Corinth called Jews 'sharks' feeding upon soldiers. ... In the midst of this growing anti-Jewish feeling, Grant issued General Orders No. 11 on December 17, 1862."

In 2017, historian Ron Chernow said: "Whatever the exact sequence of events, Grant must have felt wounded by the situation, for he had railed at traders only to discover his father in cahoots with them. Grant's infamous order was a self-inflicted wound, issued at a moment of pique and over the objections of Rawlins. Besides pointing to the order's offensive nature, Rawlins predicted it would be countermanded by Washington."

In 2017, historian Charles W. Calhoun said: "The question dated from late 1862, when Grant had issued an order expelling "Jews, as a class", from the area of his command in Mississippi for violating trade restrictions. The ill-advised order reflected his frustrations in trying to control illicit commerce behind the lines, and Lincoln countermanded it as soon as it came to his attention."

In 2018, historian Paul Kahan said: "Offended by the swarm of speculators and traders who profited from the war, Grant issued his infamous General Order No. 11, which included three points, the first of which commanded: "The Jews, as a class violating every regulation of trade established by the Treasury Department and also department orders, are hereby expelled from the Department [of the Tennessee] within twenty-four hours from the receipt of this order."

== Sources ==
- Brands, H. W. (2012). The Man Who Saved the Union: Ulysses S. Grant in War and Peace. New York: Doubleday. ISBN 978-0-385-53241-9.
- Calhoun, Charles W. (2017). The Presidency of Ulysses S. Grant. Lawrence: University Press of Kansas. ISBN 978-0-7006-2484-3. scholarly review and response by Calhoun at doi:10.14296/RiH/2014/2270
- Chernow, Ron (2017). Grant. New York: Penguin Press. ISBN 978-1-59420-487-6.
- Feldberg, Michael. "General Grant and the Jews". My Jewish Learning.
- Kahan, Paul (2018). The Presidency of Ulysses S. Grant: Preserving the Civil War's Legacy. Yardley, PA: Westholme Publishing, LLC. ISBN 978-1-59416-273-2.
- McFeely, William S. (1981). Grant: A Biography. Norton. ISBN 0-393-01372-3.
- Miller, Donald L. (2019). Vicksburg: Grant's Campaign That Broke the Confederacy. Simon and Schuster. ISBN 978-1-4516-4137-0.
- Sarna, Jonathan D. (2012a). When General Grant Expelled the Jews. New York: Schocken Books. ISBN 978-0-8052-4279-9.
- Sarna, Jonathan D. (March 23, 2012b). "When General Grant Expelled the Jews". jewishweek.timesofisrael.com. The New York Jewish Week.
- Smith, Jean Edward (2001). Grant. New York: Simon & Schuster. ISBN 0-684-84927-5.
- White, Ronald C. (2016). American Ulysses: A Life of Ulysses S. Grant. Random House Publishing Group. ISBN 978-1-58836-992-5.
