= Thomas Hines =

Confederate Army officer

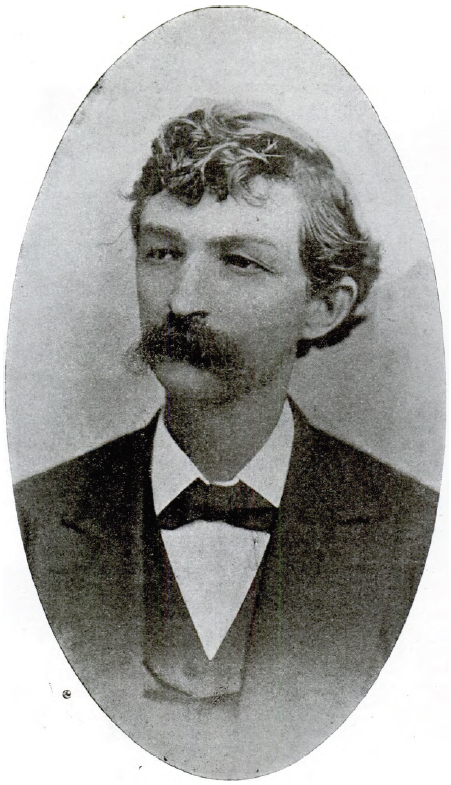
- Thomas Hines
- Born: October 8, 1838; Butler County, Kentucky
- Died: January 23, 1898 (aged 59); Frankfort, Kentucky
- Military career
- Allegiance: Confederate States of America
- Branch: Confederate States Army
- Service years: 1861–65 (CSA)
- Rank: Captain
- Units: 2nd Kentucky Cavalry; 9th Kentucky Cavalry
- Commands: "Buckner's Guides"
- Conflicts: American Civil War: Hines' Raid; Morgan's Raid

Thomas Henry Hines (October 8, 1838 – January 23, 1898) was a Confederate cavalryman who was known for his espionage activities during the last two years of the American Civil War.

A native of Butler County, Kentucky, he initially worked as a grammar instructor, mainly at the Masonic University of La Grange, Kentucky. During the first year of the war, he was a field officer, initiating several raids. He was an assistant to John Hunt Morgan, doing a preparatory raid (Hines' Raid) in advance of Morgan's Raid through the states of Indiana and Ohio, and after being captured with Morgan, organized their escape from the Ohio Penitentiary. He was then granted secret authorisation, following the Dahlgren Affair, by Jefferson Davis and his cabinet to unleash total war behind Union lines. From a secret base at Toronto in Upper Canada, Hines oversaw Confederate Secret Service covert operations with Copperhead Democrat leaders Harrison H. Dodd and Clement Vallandigham for arson, state terrorism, guerrilla warfare, and pro-Confederate regime change uprisings by the paramilitary Order of the Sons of Liberty against pro-Union governors throughout the Old Northwest.

Hines made narrow, unlikely escapes on several occasions during the war. At one point, he concealed himself in a mattress that was being used at the time; on another occasion, he was confused for the actor and assassin John Wilkes Booth, a dangerous case of mistaken identity that forced him to flee Detroit in April 1865 by holding a ferry captain at gunpoint. Union agents viewed Hines as the man they most needed to apprehend, but apart from the time he served at the Ohio Penitentiary in late 1863, he was never captured.

After the war, once it was safe for him to return to his native Kentucky, he settled down with much of his family in Bowling Green. He started practicing law, which led him to serve on the Kentucky Court of Appeals, eventually becoming its chief justice. Later, he practiced law in Frankfort, Kentucky, until he died in 1898, keeping many of the secrets of Confederate espionage from public knowledge.

== Early life ==
Hines was born in Butler County, Kentucky, on October 8, 1838, to Judge Warren W. and Sarah Carson Hines and was raised in Warren County, Kentucky. While his education was largely informal, he spent some time in common schools. He was 5 feet 9 inches (1.75 m) tall, and weighed a mere 140 pounds (64 kg). With his slender build, Hines was described as rather benign in appearance, and a friend observed that he had a voice resembling a "refined woman". He was said to love women, music, and horses fondly.

He became an adjunct professor at the Masonic University, a school established by the Grand Lodge of Kentucky Freemasons for teaching the orphans of Kentucky Masons in La Grange in 1859. He was the principal of its grammar school, but with the advent of the war, he joined the Confederate States Army in September 1861.

== American Civil War ==
=== Early war experiences ===
Hines joined the Confederate army, as did at least eleven cousins. Hines initially led "Buckner's Guides", which were attached to Albert Sidney Johnston's command, as his fellow guides recognized his "coolness and leadership". In November 1861, he was given a lieutenant's commission. On December 31, 1861, he led a successful mission to Borah's Ferry, Kentucky, to attack a Union outpost there.

The Guides were disbanded in January 1862 after the Confederate government of Kentucky fled Bowling Green; Hines did not want to fight anywhere except in Kentucky. He traveled to Richmond, Virginia, and missed the Battle of Shiloh as a result. In April, Hines decided to join Brig. Gen. John Hunt Morgan, and he re-enlisted in the army as a private in the 9th Kentucky Cavalry in May 1862. Morgan commissioned Hines as a captain on June 10, 1862. Afterward, Hines spent most of his time conducting espionage in Kentucky. Dressed in civilian clothes, he usually operated alone to avoid drawing attention to himself, not wanting to be executed as a spy.

Hines made special trips to see loved ones on his forays in Kentucky. Often, it was to visit Nancy Sproule, his childhood sweetheart and future bride, in Brown's Lock, near Bowling Green. On other occasions, he visited his parents in Lexington, Kentucky. In both places, U.S. authorities attempted to capture Hines, but he always escaped, even after his father had been captured and his mother was sick in bed.

=== 1863 ===
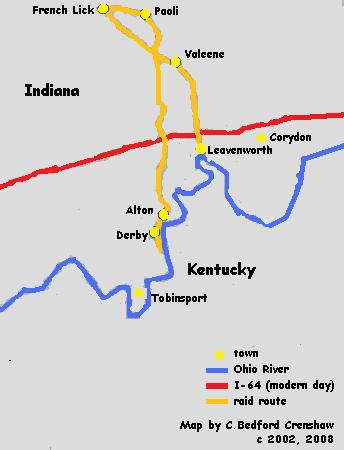
Map of Hines' Raid into Indiana

In June 1863, Hines led an invasion into Indiana with 25 Confederates posing as a U.S. unit in pursuit of deserters. Their goal was to see if the local Copperheads would support the invasion that John Hunt Morgan planned for July 1863. Traveling through Kentucky for eight days to obtain supplies for their mission, they crossed the Ohio River to enter Indiana, near the village of Derby, on June 18, 1863. Hines visited the local Copperhead leader, Dr. William A. Bowles, in French Lick, and learned that there would be no formal support for Morgan's Raid. On his way back to Kentucky, Hines and his men were discovered in Valeene, Indiana, leading to a minor skirmish near Leavenworth, Indiana, on Little Blue Island. Hines abandoned his men, swimming across the Ohio River under gunfire.

After wandering around Kentucky for a week, Hines rejoined Morgan at Brandenburg, Kentucky. Colonel Basil W. Duke made a disparaging comment in his memoirs about how Hines appeared on the Brandenburg riverfront, saying Hines was "apparently the most listless inoffensive youth that was ever imposed upon"; despite being Morgan's second-in-command, Duke was usually not told of all the espionage Hines was carrying out, causing some to believe that Hines and Duke did not like each other, which was not the case.

It was due to Hines that the riverboats Alice Dean and the John T. McCombs were captured to transport Morgan's 2000+ men force across the Ohio River. Hines' reports encouraged Morgan to be rough with anyone posing as a Confederate sympathizer in Indiana, as Morgan had been relying on support from sympathizers in Indiana to be successful in his raid. Hines stayed with Morgan until the end of the raid and was with John Hunt Morgan during their imprisonment as prisoners of war, first at Johnson's Island, and later at the Ohio Penitentiary just outside downtown Columbus, Ohio.

==== Escape ====
Hines discovered a way to escape from the Ohio Penitentiary. He had been reading the novel Les Misérables and was said to be inspired by Jean Valjean and Valjean's escapes through the passages underneath Paris. Hines noticed how dry the lower prison cells felt and how they were lacking in mold, even though sunlight never shined there. This caused him to believe that escape by tunneling down was possible. After discovering an air chamber underneath them, which he had deduced, Hines began the tunneling effort. The tunnel was only eighteen inches wide, just large enough for him to enter the four-foot by four-foot air chamber surrounded by heavy masonry. As Hines and the six others who accompanied Hines and John Hunt Morgan worked on the tunnel, a thin crust of dirt was used to hide the tunnel from the prison officials. They tunneled for six weeks, with the tunnel's exit coming between the inner and the 25-foot (7.6 m) outer prison walls, near a coal pile. On the day of escape, November 26, 1863, Morgan switched cells with his brother, Richard Morgan. The day was chosen as a new Union military commander was coming to Columbus, and Morgan knew the prison cells would be inspected then. Together, after the daily midnight inspection, Hines, John Hunt Morgan, and five captains under Morgan's command used the tunnel to escape. Aided by the fact that the prison sentries sought shelter from the raging storm occurring at the time, the Confederate officers climbed the 25-foot-tall (7.6 m) wall effortlessly, using metal hooks to effect their escape.

Hines left a note for "Warden N. Merion, the Faithful, the Vigilant" that read, "Castle Merion, Cell No. 20. November 27, 1863. Commencement, November 4, 1863. Conclusion, November 20, 1863. Hours for labor per day, three. Tools, two small knives. La patience est amere, mais son fruit est doux. By order of my six honorable confederates." Those left behind were strip searched and moved to different cells in the Ohio State Penitentiary. Two of the officers who escaped with Hines and Morgan, Ralph Sheldon and Samuel Taylor, were captured four days later in Louisville, Kentucky. Still, the other three (Captain Jacob Bennett, Captain L. D. Hockersmith, and Captain Augustus Magee) escaped to Canada and the Confederacy.

Hines led John Hunt Morgan back to Confederate lines. First, they arrived at the train station in downtown Columbus, where they bought tickets to Cincinnati, Ohio. The duo jumped off the train before it entered the Cincinnati train station. They continued to evade capture in Cincinnati, staying for one night at the Ben Johnson House in Bardstown, Kentucky. In Tennessee, Hines diverted the Union troops' attention away from Morgan and was himself recaptured and sentenced to death by hanging. He escaped that night by telling stories to the soldier in charge of him and subdued him when given the chance. A few days later, he again escaped U.S. soldiers who intended to hang him.

=== Northwest Conspiracy ===
Hines traveled to Richmond, Virginia, after his escape in January 1864. He convinced Confederate President Jefferson Davis of a plan to instill mass panic in the northern states by freeing prisoners and systematic arson in the larger U.S. cities. Impressed by Hines' plan and wishing to retaliate for the Dahlgren affair, Davis agreed to back him. Davis urged Hines to tell Secretary of State Judah P. Benjamin and Secretary of War James Seddon his plan. Both men agreed to the project and encouraged Hines to proceed, with the only hesitation by Davis, Benjamin, and Sheldon being the potentially damaging effect on public opinion of the exposure of such a plan, including what Great Britain and the Second French Empire would think of Hines' actions.

Hines thought entering the Union from Canada would be easier and traveled there during the winter. Hines led the Northwest Conspiracy from Canada in the fall of 1864. Colonel Benjamin Anderson was involved in the plot, along with other Confederate soldiers. It was hoped that Hines and his men would be able to free the Confederate prisoners held at Camp Douglas in Chicago, Illinois.

Hines led sixty men from Toronto, Ontario, on August 25, 1864. They arrived during the Democratic Party National Convention in Chicago that year. The Copperheads had told Hines to wait until that time, as they said that 50,000 Copperheads would be there for the event. However, encountering Copperhead hesitation to assist Hines and his force, and with U.S. authorities knowledgeable of the plot, Hines and his men were forced to flee Chicago on August 30, 1864. Many men thought Anderson may have been a double agent, forcing him to leave the group. A second attempt to free the Camp Douglas Confederate prisoners occurred during the United States Presidential Election of 1864, but that plan was also foiled.

In the same year, he tried to free Confederate prisoners of war by recruiting former members of Morgan's Raiders who had escaped to Canada, including John Hunt Morgan's telegrapher George "Lightning" Ellsworth, who was a native of Canada. On his last day in Chicago, Hines had to avoid discovery by U.S. soldiers inspecting the home he was hiding in by crawling into a mattress upon which the homeowner's wife lay ill with delirium. The soldiers inspected the house he was in and even checked to see if Hines was lying on the bed, but they did not discover Hines in the mattress. The soldiers established a guard by the door of the house. Visitors were encouraged to visit the sick woman as it rained the next day. The soldiers never looked at the faces under the umbrellas, so Hines sneaked out of the house and left Chicago.

=== Late war ===
In October 1864, Hines again went to Cincinnati after crossing covertly through Indiana, where U.S. troops sought him again. This time, with the help of friends whose home he hid in, Hines concealed himself in an old closet obscured by mortar and red bricks, where he avoided detection by the troops who inspected the house. Hines learned there that his beloved Nancy Sproule was in an Ohio convent. He decided to "spirit" her from it. On November 10, 1864, at St. Mary's Catholic Church in Covington, Kentucky, they were married, despite her father's wishes to wait until the war was over due to Hines' wartime activities. They spent a week's honeymoon in Kentucky, after which Hines returned to his clandestine activities in Canada.

Two days after Lincoln's assassination, on April 16, 1865, Hines was in Detroit, Michigan, when he was mistaken for John Wilkes Booth, who was then the subject of a massive search. After finding himself in a fight, Hines jumped several fences and made his way to Detroit's wharf. He waited for a ferryboat to empty its passengers and then forced the captain at gunpoint to take him across the Detroit River to Canada. On arrival, Hines apologized to the captain and gave him five dollars. Hines' exploit led to the mistaken rumor that Booth had escaped into Canada.

== Later life ==
After he fled Detroit, Hines went to Toronto, where several other former Confederates lived. He did not expect to return to the United States, so he sent for his wife, Nancy. In Toronto, he studied law with General John C. Breckinridge, a former Vice President of the United States. Once U.S. President Andrew Johnson declared a pardon for most former Confederates, Hines returned to Detroit to sign a loyalty oath to the United States on July 20, 1865. However, knowing that U.S. officials in Kentucky would consider him an exception to the pardon, he remained in Canada until May 1866.

After sending his wife to Kentucky, where their first child was born, Hines began living in Memphis, Tennessee, passing the bar exam on June 12, 1866, with high honors. During his stay in Memphis, he edited the Daily Appeal. Hines moved to Bowling Green, Kentucky, in 1867, where many of his family lived and practiced law. Basil W. Duke appointed Hines a colonel in the Soldiers of the Red Cross. Hines later became the County Judge for Warren County, Kentucky.

Hines was elected to the Kentucky Court of Appeals in 1878 and served there until 1886. From 1884 to 1886, he served as Chief Justice. He was said to be "exceptionally free from all judicial bias." Hines was a witness to the assassination of fellow judge John Milton Elliott on March 26, 1879, while the two were leaving the Kentucky State House, by Colonel Thomas Buford, a judge from Henry County, Kentucky. Buford, enraged by Elliott's failure to rule in favor of his late sister in a property dispute, shot Elliott with a double-barreled twelve-gauge shotgun filled with buckshot after Hines had turned and walked away from Elliott. Hines inspected the body as Buford surrendered to a deputy sheriff who had come to investigate the turmoil.

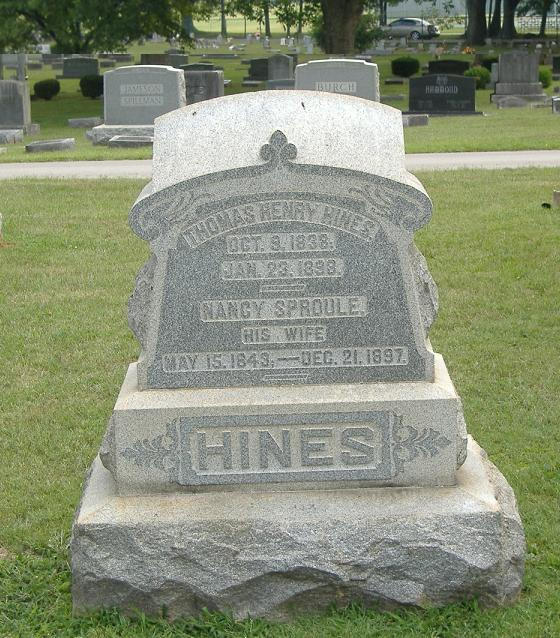
Gravestone of Thomas Hines

After his time on the Kentucky Court of Appeals, Hines returned to practicing law in Frankfort, Kentucky. In 1886, Hines began writing four articles discussing the Northwest Conspiracy for Basil W. Duke's Southern Bivouac magazine. The magazine espoused the Lost Cause of the Confederacy but was less adversarial than similar Neo-Confederate magazines, gaining a larger Northern readership than similar journals. The first of the articles was printed in the December 1886 issue. However, after consulting with Jefferson Davis at Davis' home in Mississippi, Hines did not name anybody on the Northern side who assisted in the conspiracy. After writing the first article, Hines was attacked for not being more forthcoming regarding all the participants from both newspapers' reviewers (particularly from the Louisville Times) and Southern readers, which discouraged Hines from publishing any more accounts of the Northwest Conspiracy.

Hines died in 1898 in Frankfort and was buried in Fairview Cemetery in Bowling Green, Kentucky, in the Hines series of plots. Also among the Hines family plots is the grave site of Duncan Hines, a second cousin twice removed.

== Misinformation ==
Historical markers concerning Hines' deeds have occasionally included mistaken information. The historical marker placed by the Indiana Civil War Centennial Commission in 1963 in the vicinity of Derby, Perry County, Indiana, to memorialize Hines' entry into Indiana states that Hines invaded Indiana in 1862, although he did so in 1863. In addition, a marker by the Confederate Monument of Bowling Green in Bowling Green's Fairview Cemetery says that Hines died before he could go to the dedication ceremony in 1876 when, in reality, he died in 1898 and is buried a few hundred feet away.
