= Rob Morris (Freemason) =

American poet and Freemason

- Born: August 31, 1818 near Boston, Massachusetts
- Died: July 31, 1888 (aged 69)
- Resting place: La Grange, Kentucky
- Occupation: teacher
- Known for: Poetry and Freemasonry
- Title: Poet Laureate of Freemasonry
- Predecessor: Robert Burns

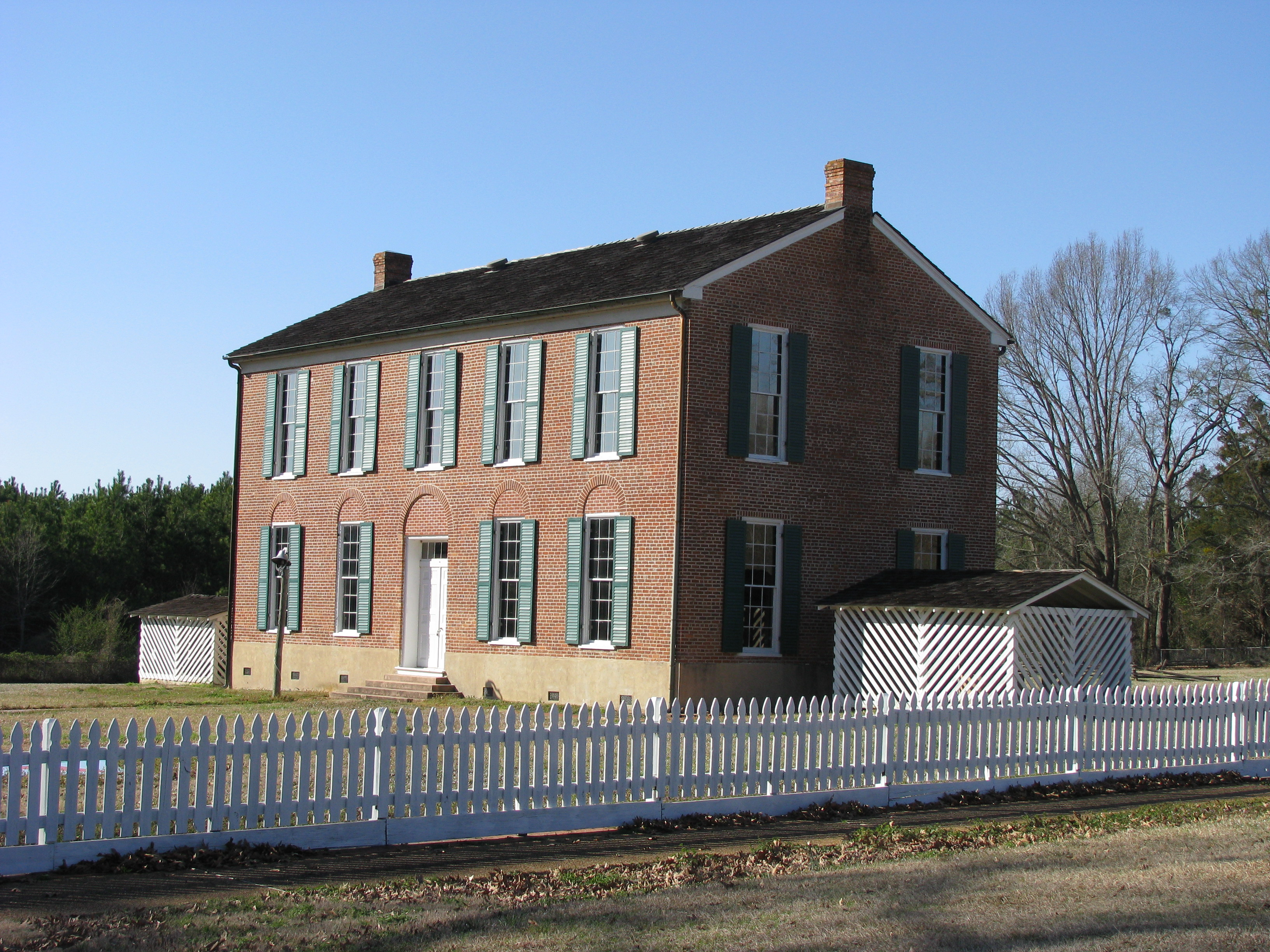
Eureka Masonic College, also known as The Little Red Schoolhouse. Birthplace of the Order of the Eastern Star

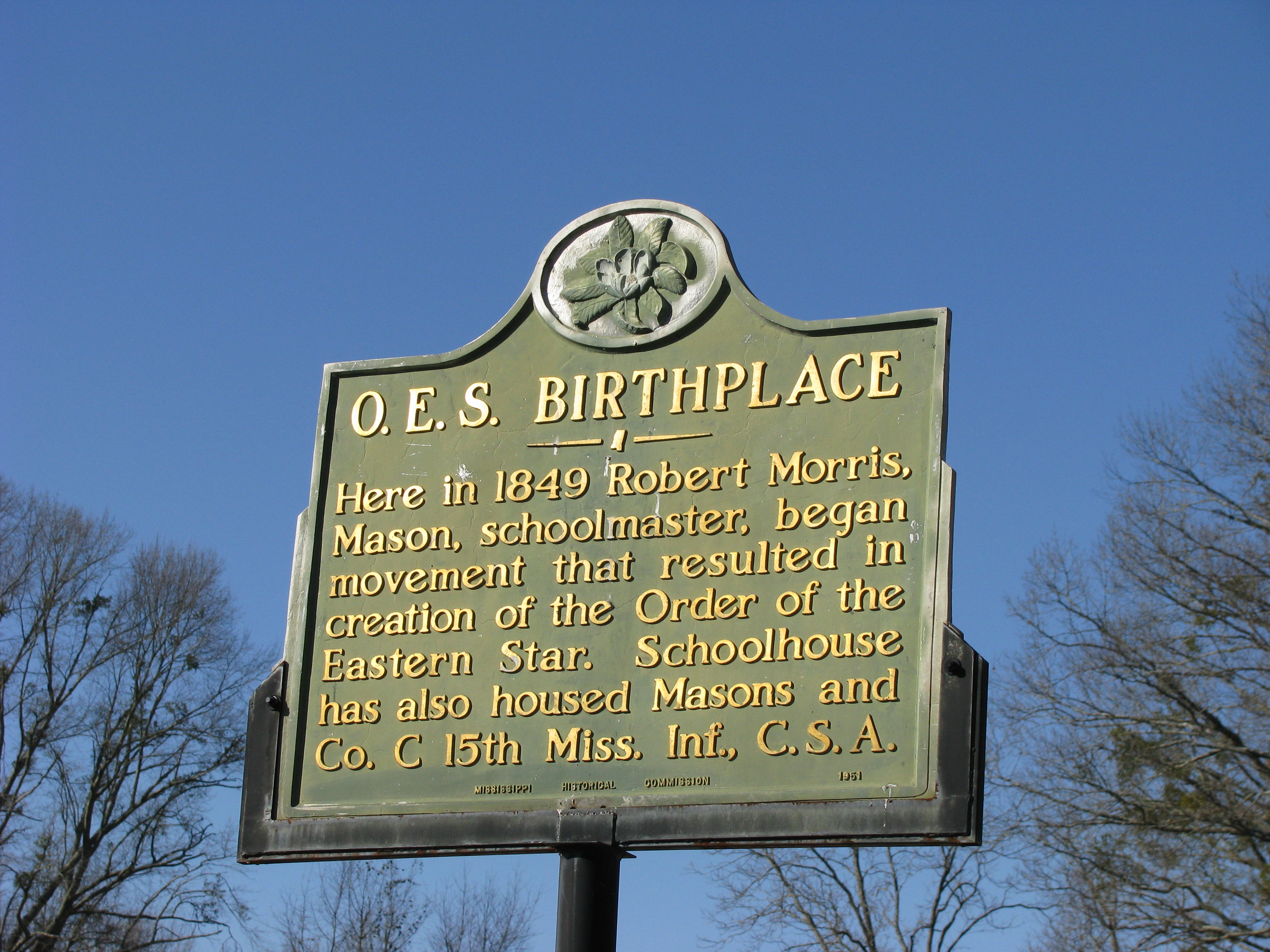
Order of the Eastern Star signage at the Little Red Schoolhouse

Rob Morris (1818-1888) was a prominent American poet and Freemason. He also created the first ritual for what was to become the Order of the Eastern Star.

== Early life ==
Rob Morris was born on August 31, 1818, in New York City. His father's name was Robert Peckham (1789–1825) and his mother was Charlotte Lavinia Shaw Peckham (1786–1837). Charlotte and Robert Peckham had five children. The first two, John Fales Peckham and Mary Shaw Peckham, died in infancy. The third child, John Anson Peckham was born in 1816 followed by Robert Peckham (Morris) in 1818 and sister Charlotte Fales Peckham in 1821. All three children were born in New York City where their father, Robert, worked as an accountant at 99 Greenwich at a marble yard. The Peckham family lived at 26 Rector Street. In 1821, the couple split and mother Charlotte left her husband and returned to Taunton, Massachusetts, taking their infant daughter, Charlotte. The two boys stayed with their father in New York City. In 1825 Robert Peckham died in a NY hospital and the two sons went to live with their mother and sister. Robert Peckham (Morris) attended the Bristol Academy in Tauntan and during this time changed his surname from Peckham to Morris. It has yet to be ascertained why Robert Peckham changed his name to Rob Morris. Throughout most of Morris's adult life, he continued correspondence with this brother, John and sister Charlotte.

At age 18 Rob Morris left his family to go out West and seek his fortune. He was teaching school at the DeSoto Academy in northwest Mississippi when he met his wife, Charlotte Mendenhall. Charlotte's family lived in Germantown, Tennessee, close to Memphis. Charlotte's parents were Samuel and Sarah Mendenhall. Rob Morris and Charlotte Mendenhall married on May 26, 1841.

== Eastern Star ==
After he became a Mason on March 5, 1846, he became convinced that there needed to be a way for female relatives of Masons to share in some measure in the benefits of Freemasonry. While teaching at the Eureka Masonic College ("The Little Red Brick School Building") in Pickens, Mississippi in 1849–1850, he wrote Eastern Star's first ritual, titled The Rosary of the Eastern Star. He organized a "Supreme Constellation" in 1855 to charter Star chapters. In 1866, because of his planned travel abroad, he handed over the organizational authority of Eastern Star to Robert Macoy.

He later served as Grand Master of the Grand Lodge of Kentucky in 1858–59. Upon being given a job as professor of the Masonic University, he moved to La Grange, Kentucky in 1860.

== Poetry ==
Over the years, he wrote over 400 poems, many of which were devoted to Eastern Star and Masonry. While traveling in the Holy Land, he wrote the words to the hymn "O Galilee". In 1854, he wrote "The Level and the Square", which may be his best-known poem.

=== Poeta Laureado ===
Because of his many works on Masonic subjects, on December 17, 1884, he was crowned the "Poet Laureate of Freemasonry", an honor which had not been granted since the death of Robert Burns in 1796.

== Personal life ==
Rob and Charlotte Morris moved to Oxford, Mississippi where Rob taught at the Sylvan Academy for boys. At Oxford, on March 5, 1846, at the Gathright Lodge, Morris came "into the light" of freemasonry and became a Mason. James M. Howry, past grand master and high priest of Mississippi, initiated the 28-year-old Morris into freemasonry.

== Death ==
His health began to fail in 1887, and in June 1888, he became paralyzed. He died on July 31, 1888, and is buried at La Grange, Kentucky. The Rob Morris Home is kept as a shrine to Rob Morris by the Kentucky Grand Chapter of the Order of the Eastern Star. He and his wife are buried at the Valley of Rest within the town limits of LaGrange, KY.

== See also ==
- Charles Netter, Zionist leader, Jewish Freemason and co-founder of the Alliance Israélite Universelle
