= Rob Morris Home =

Coordinates: 38.40697°N 85.3776°W

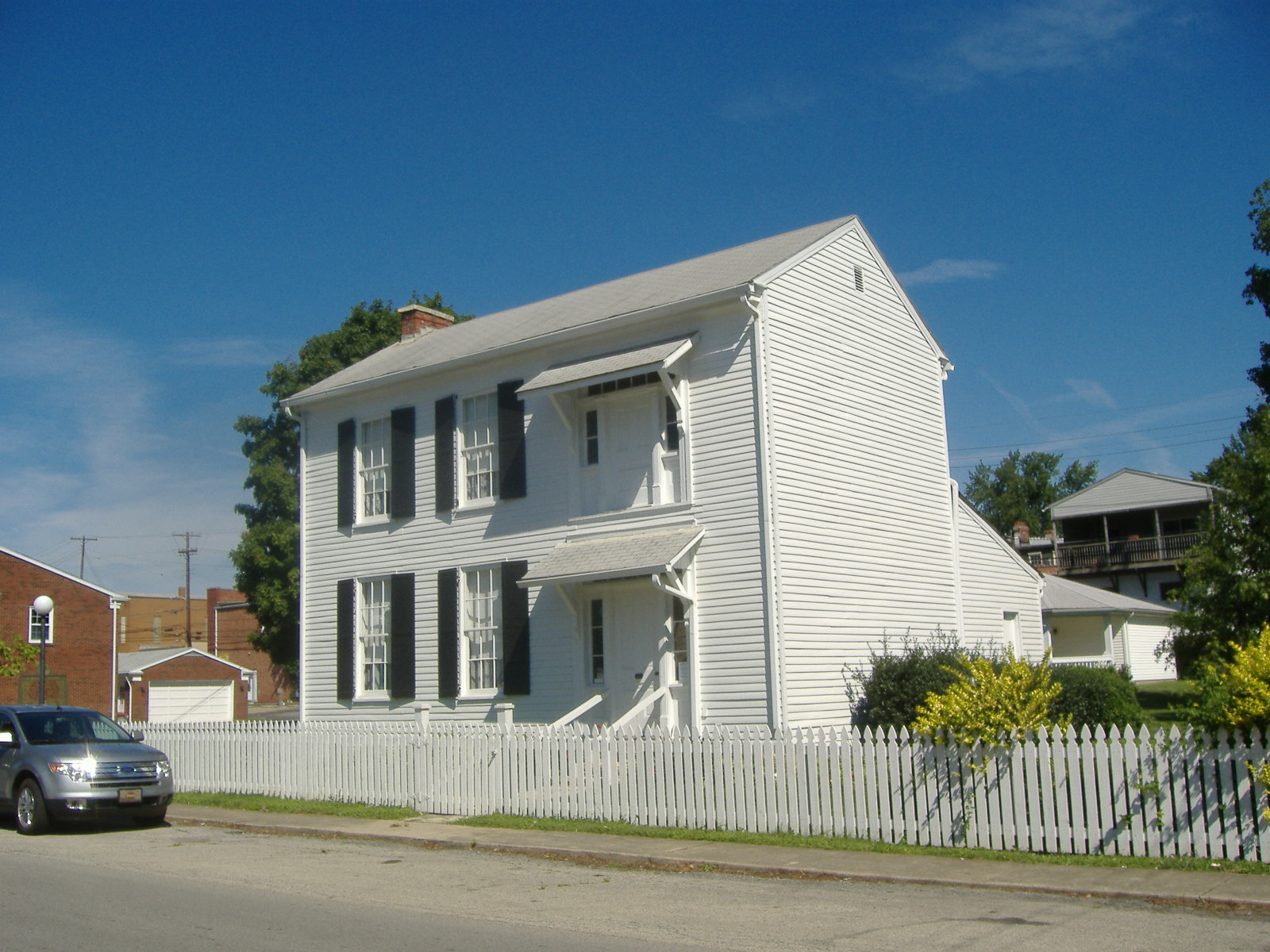
Southeast view of the Home

The Rob Morris Home, located in the east end of the Central La Grange Historic District of La Grange, Kentucky on 102 Washington Street, is the historic home of Rob Morris, the second and last poet laureate of Freemasonry and the founder of the Order of the Eastern Star.

Rob Morris came to La Grange initially to serve on the faculty of the Masonic University in 1860, after serving as the Grand Master of the Grand Lodge of Kentucky from 1858 to 1859. His first house in La Grange was burned on November 7, 1861, due to Morris' pro-Union stance, although his books regarding Freemasonry were saved (but mangled) by nearby Federal troops. Morris was lecturing at Crown Point, Indiana at the time of the fire for the Grand Lodge of Indiana. Morris considered moving away from La Grange to the state of New York, but decided against it as Kentucky would maintain a state government loyal to the federal government. He bought the house at the corner of Washington and Cedar Streets in 1862 for $1,400; the house had been built in 1840. It was here that he died in 1888, and his wife died at the home in 1893.

The Rob Morris Home is considered "one of the most architecturally and historically important houses" within the Central La Grange Historic District. Among the highlights of the architecture of the house are the front doors flanked by overlights and sidelights, a chimney on its west side that is typical of coastal North Carolina chimneys but extremely rare in Kentucky, and a side hall plan. Non-historic additions to the house include a carport.

In 1918 the Kentucky Chapter of the Order of the Eastern Star purchased the home, and has since kept it as a shrine/museum to Morris. The furnishings within date from the time Rob Morris lived in the home, and some were actually owned by Morris.

== See also ==
- Eureka Masonic College
