= Eureka Masonic College =

- U.S. National Register of Historic Places
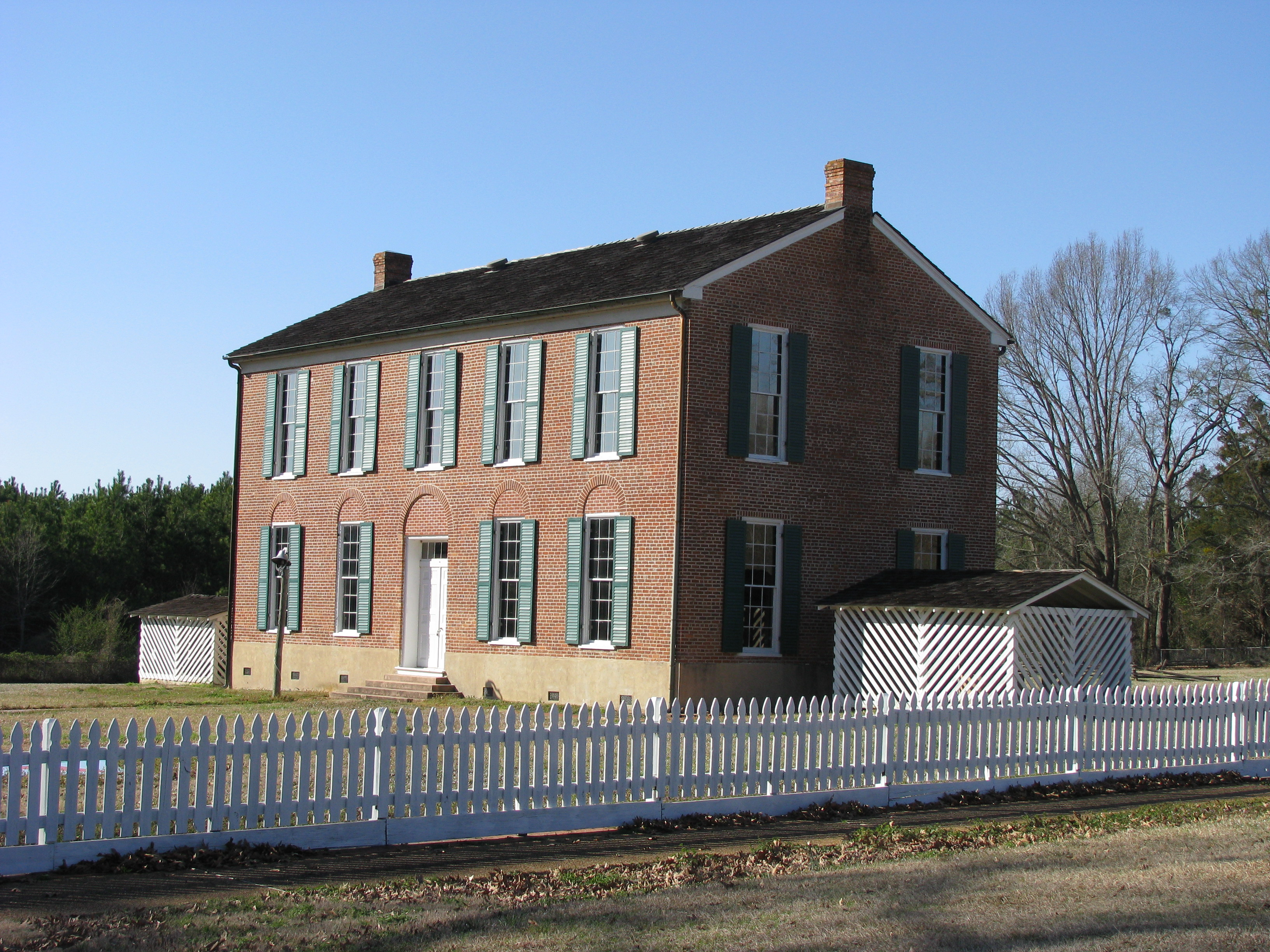
- Eureka Masonic College, also known as The Little Red Schoolhouse.

- Location within Mississippi Location within the United States
- Location: On MS 17, Richland, Holmes County, Mississippi
- Coordinates: 32°58′25″N 89°59′11″W
- Area: 3.6 acres (1.5 ha)
- Built: 1847; 179 years ago
- Architectural style: Federal
- NRHP reference No.: 70000318
- Added to NRHP: November 10, 1970

Eureka Masonic College, also known as The Little Red Schoolhouse (originally the Richland Literary Institute) in Richland, Holmes County, Mississippi, is widely known as the birthplace of the Order of the Eastern Star, created by Robert Morris.

== History ==
The educational institution was established in 1847 by the Masonic Lodges of Holmes County, Mississippi, as the Richland Literary Institute. The lodges raised $3,400 to erect the two-story brick school building.

The Holmes County Masons hired Robert Morris away from Mount Sylvan Academy in Oxford to run their new school. In 1848, the school was renamed as the "Eureka Masonic College."

Morris was concerned that the female relatives of Masons could not share in the benefits of Freemasonry. In the winter of 1849-1850, while in Jackson, Mississippi, to recuperate from an attack of an ailment that he described as rheumatism, he focused his attention on developing a women's Masonic organization. During that winter he developed a system of degrees and other principles for that organization, and in February 1850 wrote Eastern Star's first ritual, titled The Rosary of the Eastern Star.

Morris left the school some time thereafter, moving to Masonic University in LaGrange, Kentucky. Eureka Masonic College operated until 1861, with a curriculum that never extended past the college preparatory level. During the Civil War, the school building housed the regimental headquarters for a Mississippi Infantry regiment.

=== Segregated public school ===
After the Civil War, Holmes County took over the abandoned schoolhouse for use as a segregated public school for African Americans. It continued to be used for this purpose until the 1958-1959 school year.

=== Restoration of building ===
Following the school's closure, the schoolhouse was leased to the Order of the Eastern Star, which undertook an extensive restoration project that was finally completed in 1979. Ownership was transferred to the Order of the Eastern Star in August 1968.

== Location and architecture ==
The Eureka Masonic College building is located in a rural setting in Holmes County along Mississippi Highway 17 near Interstate 55. The building's footprint has dimensions of 30 feet (9.1 m) by 60 feet (18 m). There are Federal style fanlights over the doorways on its two primary facades. The first story is divided into two large classrooms, and the second story contains a single large meeting hall. At the time of its construction, it was "undoubtedly, the largest building in rural Holmes County."

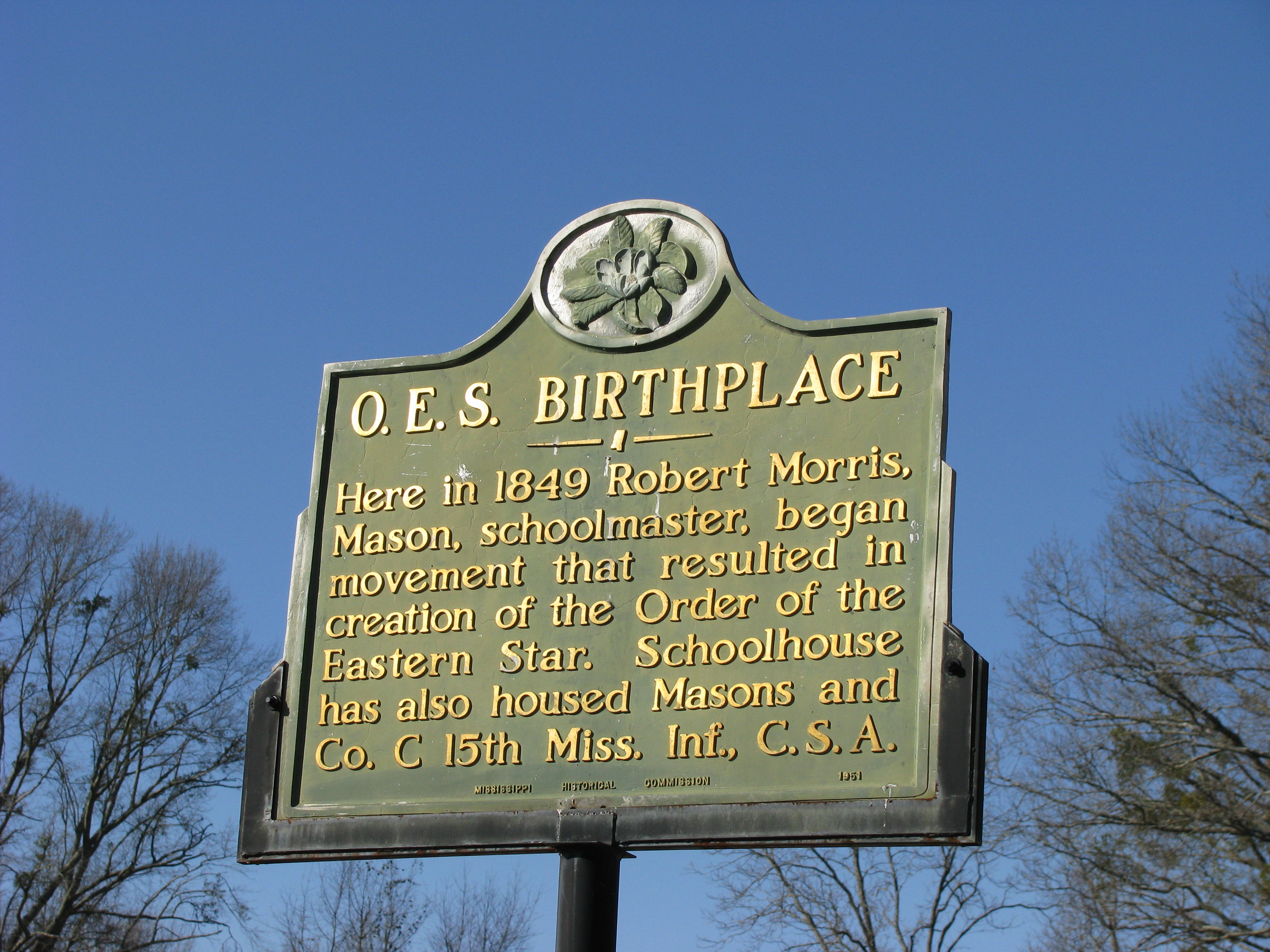
Birthplace of the Order of the Eastern Star Order of the Eastern Star signage at the Little Red Schoolhouse

== See also ==
- Rob Morris Home
