= Basil W. Duke =

Confederate general in the American Civil War

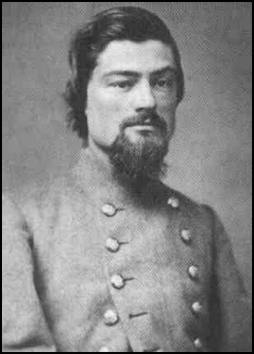
- Duke in uniform, c. 1862
- Born: Basil Wilson Duke; May 28, 1838; Georgetown, Kentucky, U.S.
- Died: September 16, 1916 (aged 78); New York City, New York, U.S.
- Burial place: Lexington Cemetery, Lexington, Kentucky, U.S.
- Military career
- Allegiance: Confederate States
- Branch: Confederate States Army
- Service years: 1861–1865
- Rank: Brigadier-General
- Units: 2nd Kentucky Cavalry; 9th Kentucky Cavalry
- Commands: Morgan's Raiders
- Conflicts: American Civil War: Battle of Shiloh; Morgan's Raid
- Other work: lawyer, lobbyist, writer

Basil Wilson Duke (May 28, 1838 – September 16, 1916) was a Confederate general officer during the American Civil War. Afterward, he achieved renown as a historian. His most notable role in the war was second-in-command to his brother-in-law John Hunt Morgan. Duke later wrote a popular account of what was called Morgan's Raid (1863). He took over Morgan's command in 1864 after U.S. soldiers killed Morgan. At the end of the war, Duke served among Confederate President Jefferson Davis's bodyguards after his flight from Richmond, Virginia, through the Carolinas.

Duke has had lasting influence as a historian who recounted the Confederate experience. As a historian, he helped to found the Filson Club in Louisville, Kentucky, and started efforts to preserve the Shiloh battlefield. He wrote numerous books and magazine articles, most notably in the Southern Bivouac. At his death, he was one of the last few high-ranking Confederate officers. Historian James A. Ramage said of Duke, "No Southerner was more dedicated to the Confederacy than General Basil W. Duke."

== Early life and education ==
Basil Wilson Duke was born in Scott County, Kentucky, on May 28, 1838, the only child of career naval officer Nathaniel W. Duke and his wife, the former Mary Pickett Currie. He was 5 feet 10 inches (1.78 m), slightly built, with a resonant voice. A relative described him as "essentially a man of the 17th century, that century in half armor, torn between chivalry and realism". The family, members of the Episcopal Church, had originally been English Catholics. They were descended from Richard Duke, a 1634 immigrant from Devonshire who reached Maryland aboard the "Ark." Through his mother, Duke was of partial Scottish descent; his maternal grandfather James Currie served several years in the Royal Navy before settling in the United States.

Both of Duke's parents died during his childhood: Mary when Basil was eight and Nathaniel when Basil was 11. Save for an instance in his Reminiscences, he seldom mentioned them. He attended Georgetown College (1853–1854) and Centre College (1854–1855) before studying law at Lexington, Kentucky's Transylvania University. After graduating in 1858, he went to St. Louis, Missouri that year to practice law; his older paternal cousin, also named Basil Duke, was practicing law there. Lexington, by then, had a multitude of competitive lawyers.

== American Civil War ==
When the American Civil War began in 1861, Duke was in Missouri, where he helped in the initial forays for Missouri's declared secession from the United States. (Missouri had both U.S. and Confederate governments during the war.) In response to many anti-slavery officials recently elected in St. Louis, he and four other men founded The Minute Men on January 7, 1861. It was a pro-secession militia-like organization. At the age of 23, Duke quickly became the leader. He organized the five companies and sought to seize the U.S. Army arsenal in St. Louis for the secessionist movement. Duke placed secessionist flags at prominent locations, looking to start fights with pro-Union forces. He was indicted for arson and treason but managed to escape to Kentucky.

Once back in Lexington, Duke married Henrietta Hunt Morgan, a sister of John Hunt Morgan, who later became a Confederate general. The Morgan family had prominent connections in Lexington. Their wedding took place on June 19, 1861. Duke later became second in command to his brother-in-law Morgan. Kitty ("Dolly") Morgan McClung, a young widow and another Morgan sister, had married A. P. Hill in 1859, who later was also a notable Confederate general.

Duke returned to Missouri to join Confederate forces in Missouri under the command of Brigadier-General Thomas Hindman; he returned to Kentucky at Brigadier General William J. Hardee's insistence. By October 1861, he had enlisted in Morgan's command and was subsequently elected Second Lieutenant.

Duke was twice wounded during the war. At the Battle of Shiloh, he was swinging his saber at a U.S. soldier when he was shot in the left shoulder by a Brown Bess musket. The bullet exited his right shoulder, barely missing the spine. After recuperating, he was promoted to lieutenant colonel and a few months later, to colonel. Duke was wounded again at Elizabethtown, Kentucky's Rolling Fork River during Morgan's Christmas Raid of 1862. On December 29, he was hit by a shell fragment while leading the back guard as the rest of Morgan's men crossed a stream; his men initially assumed he was dead.

Duke was the principal trainer for mounted combat for Morgan's Raiders. He participated in Morgan's Raid, during which he was captured at the Battle of Buffington Island on July 19, 1863. He had been leading troops in a delaying tactic to allow other Confederate forces either to escape across the Ohio River with Stovepipe Johnson or to advance further into Ohio with Morgan. Shortly thereafter, Morgan, too, was captured. Duke was imprisoned until August 3, 1864, when he was exchanged. He could probably have escaped with Morgan and Thomas Hines in 1863 but felt that to do so would hurt their chances. Morgan was easily replaced in his cell by his brother Thomas Hunt Morgan, but Duke had no similar replacement as a temporary deception.

After Morgan was killed on September 4, 1864, Duke assumed command of Morgan's forces. On September 15, 1864, he was promoted to brigadier-general and sent to Virginia. He was with Jefferson Davis shortly after Davis fled Richmond. Duke was in the final Confederate war council at the Burt-Stark Mansion in Abbeville, South Carolina, on May 2, 1865. Duke surrendered to U.S. officials on May 10, 1865, in Washington, Georgia.

As an officer, Duke had a style of "gently ordering" soldiers under his command; this enhanced their friendly relations. He loved fighting, was steadfast during difficult moments in conflicts, and was described as a "spit-and-polish" officer.

== Later life ==
After the war, Duke moved to Louisville, Kentucky, in March 1868. He returned to practicing law later that year, with his primary client being the Louisville and Nashville Railroad. Despite the L&N Railroad having been a favorite victim of Morgan's raiders during the war, he served as their chief counsel and lobbyist.

He was elected and briefly served in the Kentucky General Assembly from 1869 to 1870, resigning as he felt a conflict of interest as a lobbyist for the L&N. Duke was appointed as the Fifth Judicial District's commonwealth attorney, serving from 1875 to 1880.

1911 book, Reminiscences of General Basil W. Duke published five years before his death

Duke became intensely involved in writing the history of the Civil War and related topics. He helped to found Louisville's Filson Club (now The Filson Historical Society) in 1884, writing many of their early papers. From 1885 to 1887, he edited the magazine Southern Bivouac. He also wrote three books: History of Morgan's Cavalry (1867), History of the Bank of Kentucky, 1792-1895 (1895), and Reminiscences of General Basil W. Duke (a collection of various magazine articles he wrote) (1911). A prominent writer of the Antebellum South experience, he neither advocated slavery nor apologized for it. Although Duke believed it was good that the institution was abolished, he insisted that abolitionist claims of excessive abuse of enslaved people were exaggerated. After 1900, Duke began withdrawing from his public career. By 1903, he ceased working for the L&N.

Duke was named in the plot to assassinate William Goebel, a state representative who had just been elected as governor and was posthumously inaugurated. Duke was said to have allegedly attended a clandestine meeting at Galt House before the Goebel murder, along with the U.S. Senator William Joseph Deboe (KY), the 27th Lieutenant Governor of Kentucky, John Marshall; John McDougal Atherton, Alexander Pope Humphrey, and David W. Fairleigh. A total of sixteen people, including William S. Taylor, were eventually indicted in Goebel's assassination.

Three accepted immunity from prosecution in exchange for testimony. Only five went to trial, and two of those were acquitted.

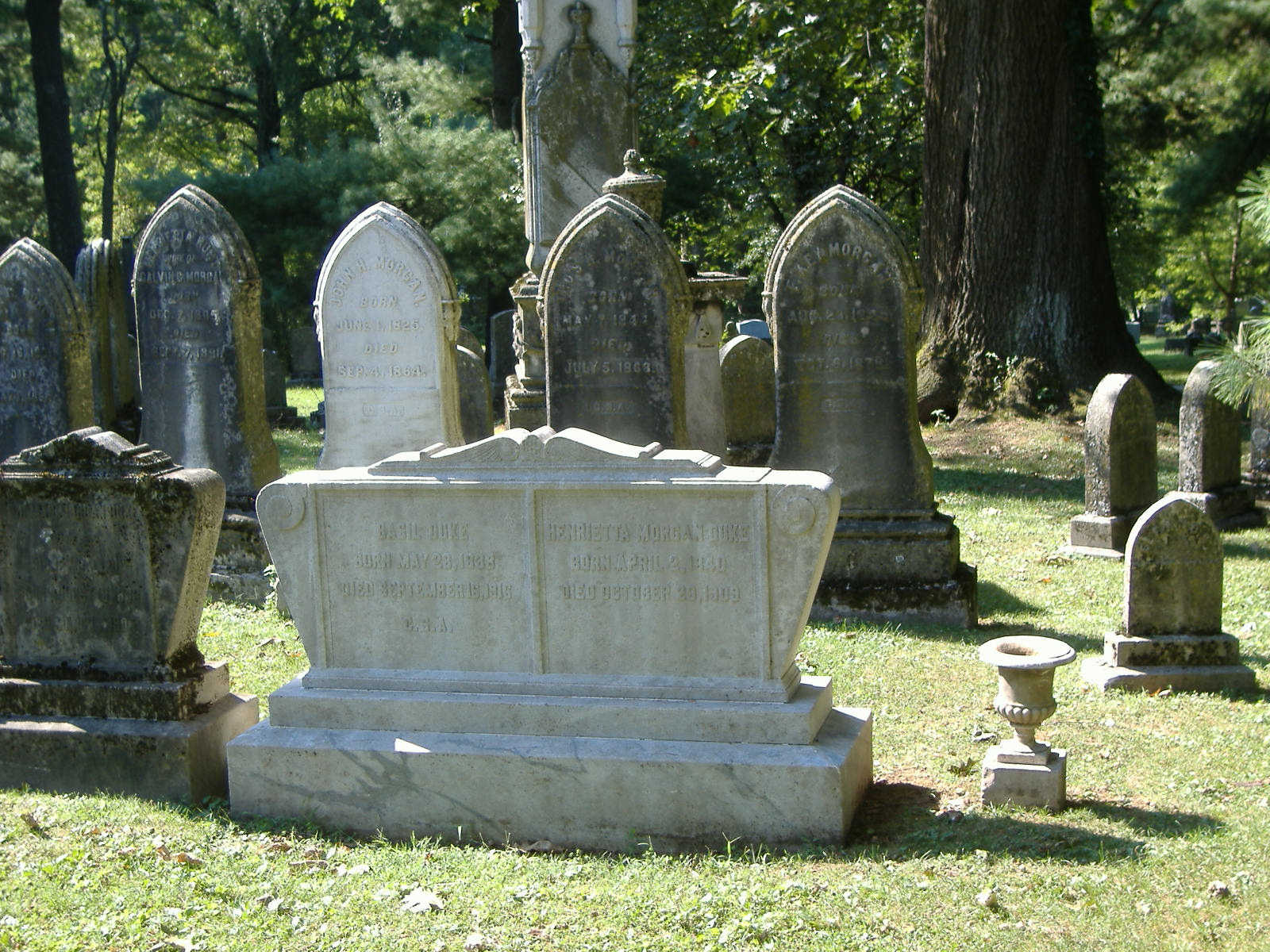
Duke's grave. John Hunt Morgan's grave is the white one behind his.

In 1904, President Theodore Roosevelt appointed Duke Shiloh National Military Park commissioner after a meeting at the Filson Club.

Duke was devastated when, on October 20, 1909, Henrietta, his wife of fifty years, died of sudden heart failure. Afterward, he lived with his daughter Julia and her family in Louisville's Cherokee Park.

Duke was among the last few surviving Confederate general officers before he died in 1916. In his final years, he spent much time responding to requests from people with questions about the Confederacy, even during the time that he was recovering from cataract surgery in 1914. Two years later, during a visit to his daughter, Mary Currie, in Massachusetts, Duke underwent surgery in a New York City hospital because of circulatory problems.

On September 1, his right foot was amputated. The leg got infected, and on September 11, the right leg was amputated at the knee. Five days later, on September 16, 1916, Duke died. He was buried beside his wife in front of the John Hunt Morgan grave in the Hunt family plot in Lexington Cemetery. He is noted for his exploits as a Confederate commander and likely even more as a master chronicler of Confederate military history.

== See also ==
- List of American Civil War generals (Confederate)
