= Elmore James =

American blues guitarist, singer, songwriter and bandleader (1918–1963)

Background information
- Also known as: "King of the Slide Guitar"
- Born: Elmore Brooks; January 27, 1918; Richland, Holmes County, Mississippi, U.S.
- Died: May 24, 1963 (aged 45) Chicago, Illinois, U.S.
- Genre: Blues
- Occupations: Musician; singer; songwriter
- Instruments: Guitar; vocals
- Years active: 1940s–1963

Elmore James (né Brooks; January 27, 1918 – May 24, 1963) was an American blues guitarist, singer, songwriter, and bandleader. Noted for his use of loud amplification and his stirring voice, James was inducted into the Rock and Roll Hall of Fame in 1992. His slide guitar technique earned him the nickname "King of the Slide Guitar".

== Biography ==
Elmore James was born Elmore Brooks in Richland, Holmes County, Mississippi, the son of 15-year-old Leola Brooks, a field hand. His father is believed to have been Joe Willie "Frost" James, who moved in with Leola, after which Elmore assumed his surname. Elmore began making music at the age of 12, using a one-string instrument (diddley bow, or jitterbug) strung on a shack wall. As a teen he performed at dances under the names "Cleanhead" and "Joe Willie James".

He was influenced by Robert Johnson, Kokomo Arnold, and Tampa Red. James recorded several of Tampa Red's songs. He also inherited from Tampa Red's band two musicians who joined his own backing band, the Broomdusters, "Little" Johnny Jones (piano) and Odie Payne (drums). In the late 1930s, James performed with blues singer Sonny Boy Williamson II.

In World War II, James enlisted in the U.S. Navy, was promoted to coxswain, and participated in the invasion of Guam. After his military discharge, James returned to central Mississippi and settled in the town of Canton with his adopted brother, Robert Holston. James began recording with Trumpet Records in nearby Jackson in January 1951, first as a sideman for Sonny Boy Williamson II and for their mutual friend Willie Love, and possibly for others as well.

James debuted as a session leader in August that year recording a Robert Johnson composition, "Dust My Broom", which was a surprise R&B hit in 1952. His backing musicians became known as the Broomdusters.

James broke his contract with Trumpet Records to sign with the Bihari brothers through their scout Ike Turner, who played guitar and piano on a couple of his early Bihari recordings. His "I Believe" was a hit a year later. During the 1950s he recorded for the Bihari brothers' Flair Records, Meteor Records, and Modern Records; he also recorded for Chess Records and Mel London's Chief Records. He played lead guitar on Big Joe Turner's 1954 top 10 R&B hit "TV Mama".

In 1959, he began recording for Bobby Robinson's Fire Records, which released "The Sky Is Crying", "My Bleeding Heart", "Stranger Blues", "Look on Yonder Wall", "Done Somebody Wrong", and "Shake Your Moneymaker", among others.

James died of a heart attack at the home of his cousin and fellow musician, Homesick James, in Chicago in 1963, at the age of 45, as he was about to tour Europe with that year's American Folk Blues Festival. He was buried in the Newport Baptist Church Cemetery, in Ebenezer, Mississippi. Phil Walden of Capricorn Records raised funds for a granite headstone for James's grave. The headstone which reads "King of the Slide Guitar", features a bronze relief of James playing guitar. It was revealed at a dedication ceremony sponsored by the Mount Zion Memorial Fund in 1992.

James was posthumously inducted into the Rock and Roll Hall of Fame in 1992 as an "Early Influence" inductee. He had been inducted in the Blues Hall of Fame within its initial list of inductions in 1980. In 2012, he was honored with a marker on the Mississippi Blues Trail in Ebenezer.

== Influence ==
James influenced many slide players, such as the blues guitarists Homesick James, Hound Dog Taylor, and J. B. Hutto. His single string playing also influenced B.B. King and Chuck Berry. The rock guitarists George Thorogood, Jimi Hendrix, Duane Allman, Jerry Garcia, Derek Trucks, Dave Mason, Brian Jones, Jeremy Spencer and Frank Zappa were all influenced by James. The Swedish pop musicians Benny Andersson and Janne Schaffer have acknowledged his influence as well. In the Beatles' song "For You Blue", John Lennon plays a slide solo on a Höfner lap steel guitar; George Harrison encourages him with "Go, Johnny, go ... Elmore James got nothin' on this, baby". Eric Burdon dedicated the song No More Elmore to him. It was featured on his album Comeback and was regularly played at his concerts in the 1980s and 1990s.

== Discography ==
=== Selected singles ===
- "Dust My Broom" (1951 and 1965)
- "I Believe" (1953)
- "Standing at the Crossroads" (1954 and 1965)
- "Dust My Blues" (1955)
- "It Hurts Me Too" (1957 and 1965)
- "The Sky Is Crying" (1960)
- "I Can't Hold Out" (1960)
- "Rollin' and Tumblin'" (1960)
- "Shake Your Moneymaker" (1961)
- "Look on Yonder Wall" (1961)
- "Bleeding Heart" (1965)
- "One Way Out" (1965)
- "Every Day I Have the Blues" (1965)
- "Madison Blues" (1968)

=== Selected compilation albums ===
- Blues After Hours (Crown, 1960)
- The Sky Is Crying (Sphere Sound, 1965)
- I Need You (Sphere Sound, 1966)
- Whose Muddy Shoes (Chess, 1969) (split album with John Brim)
- Street Talkin' (Muse, 1975) (split album with Eddie Taylor)
- Shake Your Money Maker (Charly R&B, 1986)
- Golden Classics (Collectables, 1988)
- King of the Slide Guitar (Capricorn, 1992)
- The Classic Early Recordings: 1951–1956 (Virgin/Flair, 1993)
- The Sky Is Crying: The History of Elmore James (Rhino, 1993)
- Rollin' and Tumblin' (Recall/Snapper, 1999)

== Gallery ==
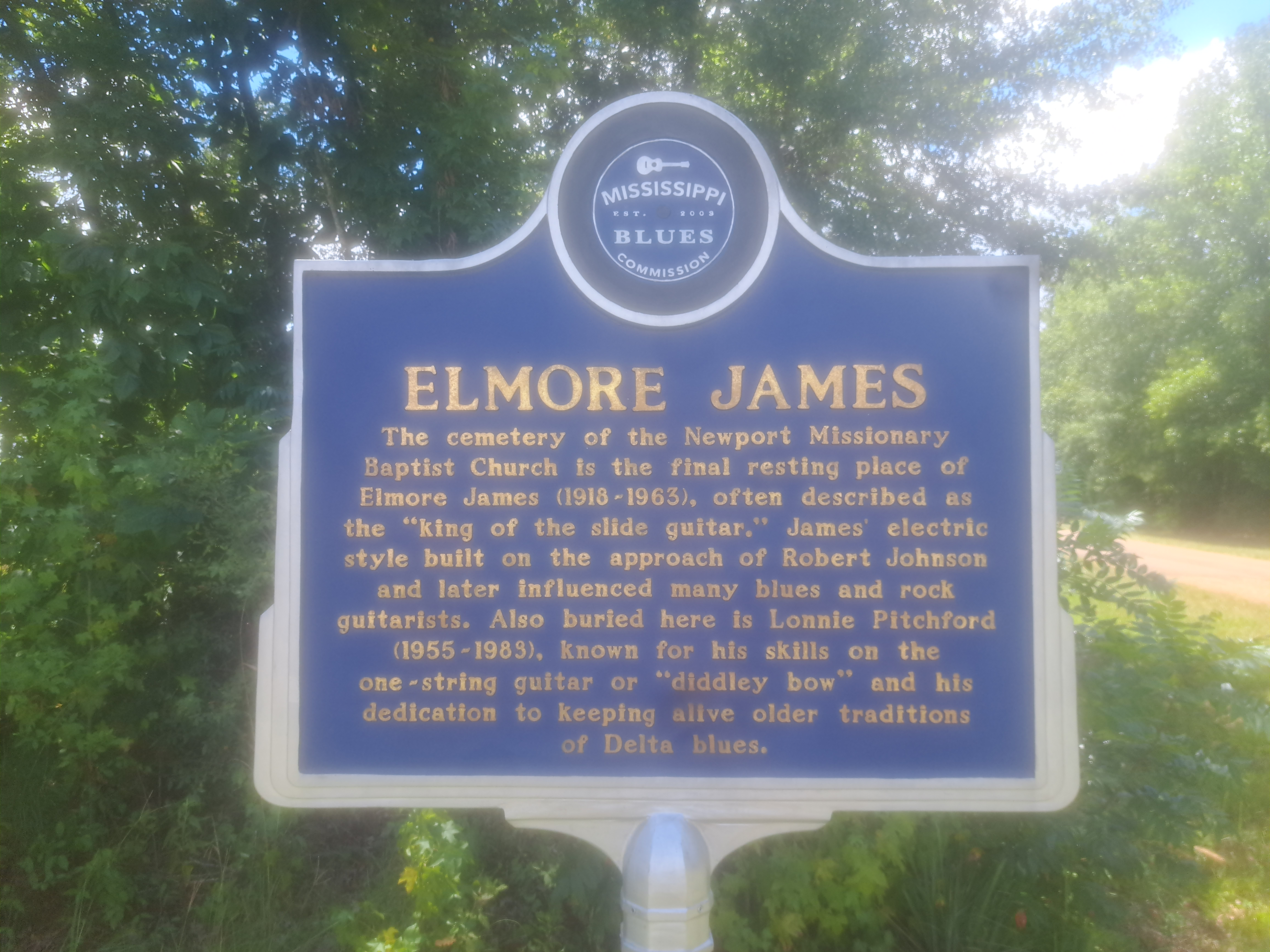
Blues Trail Marker

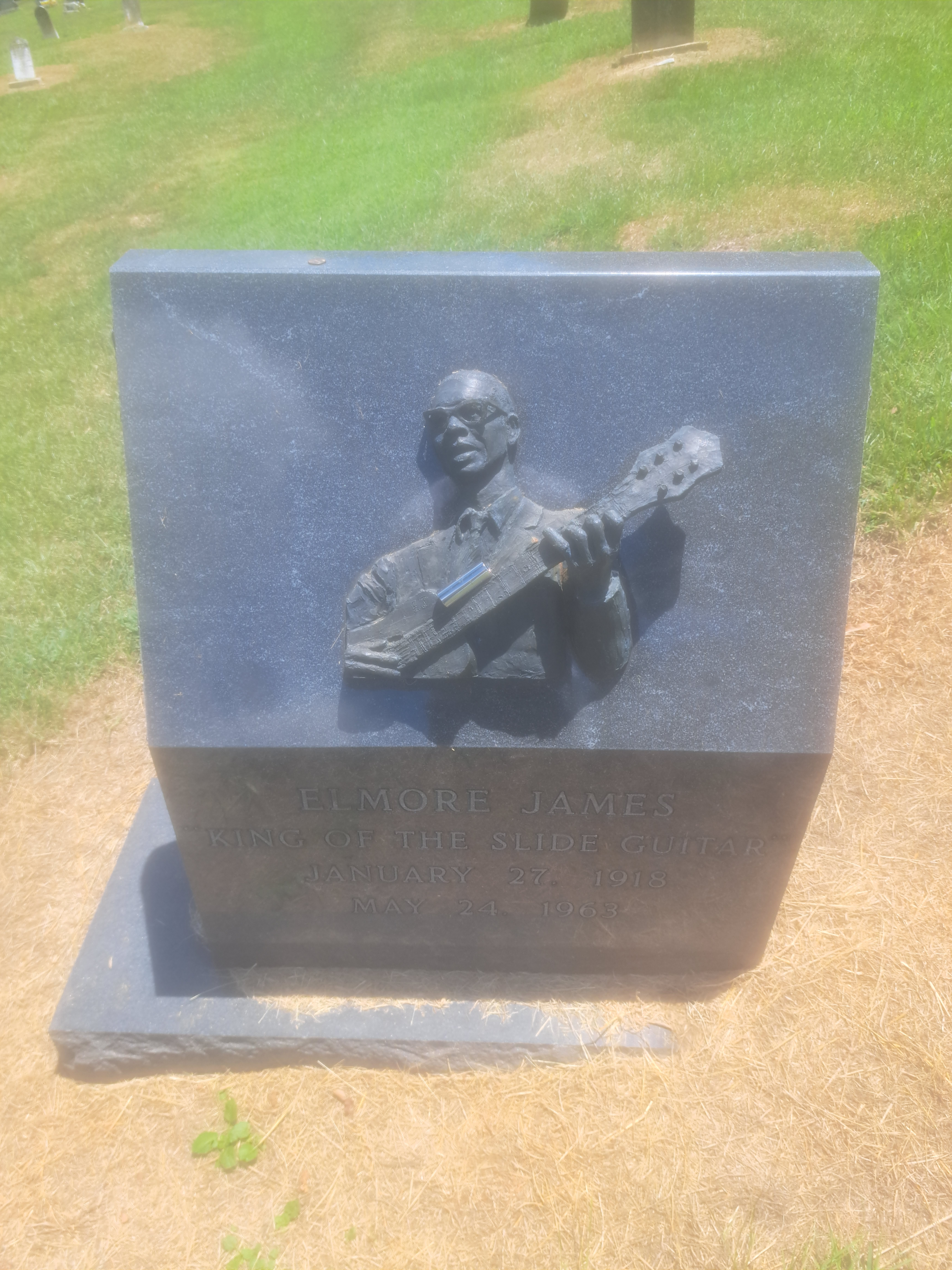
Gravesite located at Newport Missionary Baptist Church
