= Benjamin Anderson (soldier) =

- Born: c. 1836; Louisville, Kentucky, U.S.
- Died: February 21, 1865 (aged 28–29); Cincinnati, Ohio, U.S.
- Burial place: Cave Hill Cemetery; Louisville, Kentucky, U.S.
- Military career
- Allegiance: Confederate States of America
- Branch: Confederate States Army
- Service years: 1861–62, 1864? (CSA) 1863, 1864? (USA)
- Rank: Lieutenant Colonel (CSA); Colonel
- Units: 1st Kentucky Infantry (CSA), 1st Louisiana Infantry
- Commands: Third Kentucky Infantry (CSA)
- Conflicts: Filibuster War; American Civil War: Battle of Shiloh

Benjamin M. Anderson (c. 1836 – February 21, 1865) was a partisan soldier for the Confederate States of America during the American Civil War. He had gained military experience while serving under William Walker's filibustering campaign in Nicaragua. During the Civil War, he served under Thomas Hines during Hines' espionage efforts behind Northern lines. While jailed for his war activities in a Cincinnati, Ohio jail, he committed suicide by a self-inflicted gunshot to the head on February 19, 1865.

== Biography ==
It is believed that Anderson was born in about 1836, to James and Mary Anderson of Louisville, Kentucky. In early 1856, he became a captain for Colonel Jack Allen's Kentucky Rifles – a group under William Walker. At the Siege of Granada, Nicaragua (November 24 – December 11, 1856), he was seriously wounded.

After the initial seven states seceded from the United States to form the Confederate States of America, Anderson journeyed in March 1861 to the then-capital of the Confederacy at Montgomery, Alabama, to volunteer the services of several Kentuckians for the Confederate Army. On April 17, 1861, Anderson took his "Davis Guards" to New Orleans, where they were originally assigned to the First Louisiana Infantry. He was quickly promoted from Captain to Major of the First Kentucky Infantry (July 19, 1861) in Virginia to Lieutenant Colonel of the Third Kentucky Infantry in the Western Theatre of the War on October 25, 1861. He assisted in the evacuation of the Confederate government of Kentucky from Bowling Green, Kentucky in February 1862. Once again, he would be seriously wounded at the Battle of Shiloh, and would resign his commission on May 24, 1862.

He briefly returned to the Confederate Army as a staff officer, but eventually got tired of it. He took an Oath of Allegiance to the Union cause to Union Brigadier General Jeremiah T. Boyle. However, he was now a social outcast to those with Southern sympathies, and he was followed continuously by Union detectives. There is some belief that he joined the Copperheads or Confederate "Sons of Liberty" afterward. He was involved in Thomas Hines' plans to free Confederate prisoners in Chicago's Camp Douglas, but he may have been a double agent.

By October 1864, he came back to Louisville, where he and General Boyle became partners in an oil venture. On December 18, 1864, he was arrested for his part in Hines' activities. During January 1865, he and seven others were tried on conspiracy charges for the actions involving the attempt to free prisoners at Camp Douglas. As a result of feeling he had betrayed the Union people whom he befriended, and renouncing the Confederate cause, he said he "would prefer being dead than disgraced". He shot himself in the head while he was jail in Cincinnati on February 19, 1865, and remained in pain until February 21, when he died. Amongst others, two were acquitted, one was sentenced to be hanged (but later commuted to life imprisonment), one escaped before being hanged, and the other two served 3–5 years at the Ohio Penitentiary, the judgment being made on April 19, 1865. However, charges were dropped against another for health reasons, while charges were not brought against the last.

He is buried in Cave Hill Cemetery in the Anderson family plots.
