= Ben Johnson House (Bardstown, Kentucky) =

- U.S. National Register of Historic Places
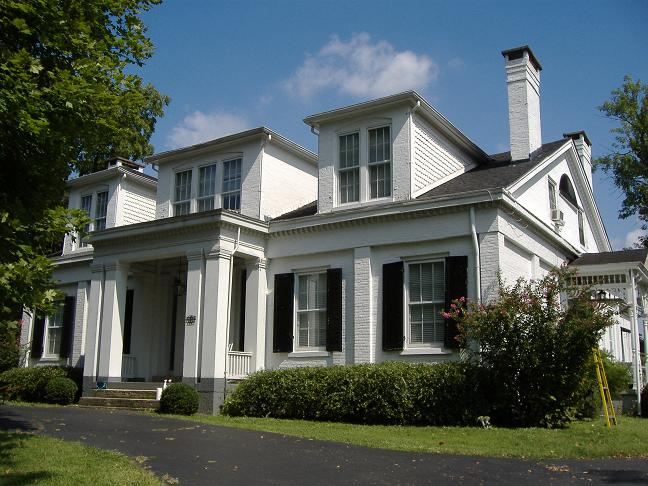

- Location within Kentucky Location within the United States
- Location: 1003 N. 3rd St. (U.S. 31E/U.S. 150), Bardstown, Kentucky
- Coordinates: 37.8284401°N 85.46045512°W
- Area: 3 acres (1.2 ha)
- Built: 1851
- Architectural style: Greek Revival
- NRHP reference No.: 79001026
- Added to NRHP: July 16, 1979

The Ben Johnson House is in the northern outskirts of Bardstown, Kentucky. It was built in 1851 in a Greek Revival style for state senator and lieutenant governor William Johnson. The house's name comes from William's son Ben Johnson, who was a congressman for two decades, speaker of the state House, state senator and collector of internal revenue for Kentucky in the second term of Grover Cleveland.

The house was listed on the National Register of Historic Places in 1979. The listing included four contributing buildings and a contributing structure. The main house is built of brick laid in common bond. Its west-facing front has a portico with paired columns and a denticulated cornice; a gabled Victorian porch faces to the south. Nearly contemporary buildings include a one-story, brick cottage, a Victorian style gazebo, a cylindrical-shaped smokehouse.

When the Confederacy was deciding on a national flag, William's wife and Ben's mother Nancy was part of the committee that chose the Stars and Bars, and was first revealed to the public at the Johnson House in 1861 in front of 5,000 people.

When John Hunt Morgan and Thomas Hines escaped from the Ohio Penitentiary in 1863, they spent a night at the House before continuing to Confederate lines.

For some time it was "The Mansion" bed and breakfast, but it has since stopped being a hostelry.

The grounds are decorated with apple, dogwood, maple, mimosa, and pear trees.
