= Julia Blackburn Duke Henning =

American suffragist

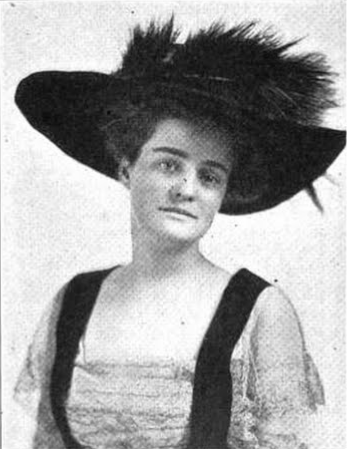
- Julia Blackburn Duke Henning from a 1918 publication.
- Born: Julia Blackburn Duke; July 23, 1875; Louisville, Kentucky, U.S.
- Died: July 7, 1961; Louisville, Kentucky, U.S.
- Resting place: Cave Hill Cemetery; Louisville, kentucky, U.S.
- Occupations: Suffragist; clubwoman
- Parent: Basil W. Duke
- Relatives: John Hunt Morgan (uncle)

Julia Blackburn Duke Henning (July 23, 1875 – July 7, 1961) was an American suffragist and clubwoman, based in Louisville, Kentucky.

== Early life and education ==
Julia Blackburn Duke was born in Louisville, the daughter of Basil Wilson Duke and Henrietta Morgan Duke. Her father was a brigadier general in the Confederate States Army during the American Civil War. Her uncle John Hunt Morgan was also a Confederate general. Duke attended Bryn Mawr College from 1893 to 1895.

== Career ==
Henning was president of the Louisville Suffrage Association and Congressional chair of the Kentucky Equal Rights Association. She also served on the executive board of the National American Woman Suffrage Association (NAWSA). After suffrage was won, she was the first president of the Louisville chapter of the League of Women Voters. "I firmly believed that the courage of women throughout the United States, who are intelligently facing their responsibility to the franchise, will bring results in marked progress along many lines", she told a newspaper in 1923.

In 1924 Henning testified at a Kentucky Senate hearing on charities and corrections. In 1925 she was mentioned as a possible Senate candidate, and issued a statement explaining that "under no circumstances would she enter the race".

Henning, was considered a stylish beauty in Louisville society, with one columnist remarking that "she is certainly of the artistic stripe and very much like the Burn-Jones style so much a la mode now." She was involved in the Frontier Nursing Association, the Episcopal Church, and the Filson Club. She spoke to community groups about various topics, including the World Court.

== Personal life and legacy ==
Duke married Louisville investment banker Samuel Cowen Henning in 1897. They had four children and lived in Louisville's Cherokee Park neighborhood. Her husband died in 1913. Henning died in 1961, in Louisville, at age 85. The Filson Historical Society library holds some of Henning's papers. In 2020, her grave at Cave Hill Cemetery was one site in Louisville's annual "Thank a Suffragist" event.

Her daughters Henrietta Hunt Henning (1898–1964) and Julia Duke Henning (1901–1996) became artists. Her son Basil Duke Henning (1910–1990) was a historian and editor, and resident master at Yale University from 1946 to 1975. Her other son, James Williamson Henning III (1907–1972), was president of an insurance company and a county commissioner in Louisville.
