= Masonic University =

Coordinates: 38°24.519′N 85°22.76′W

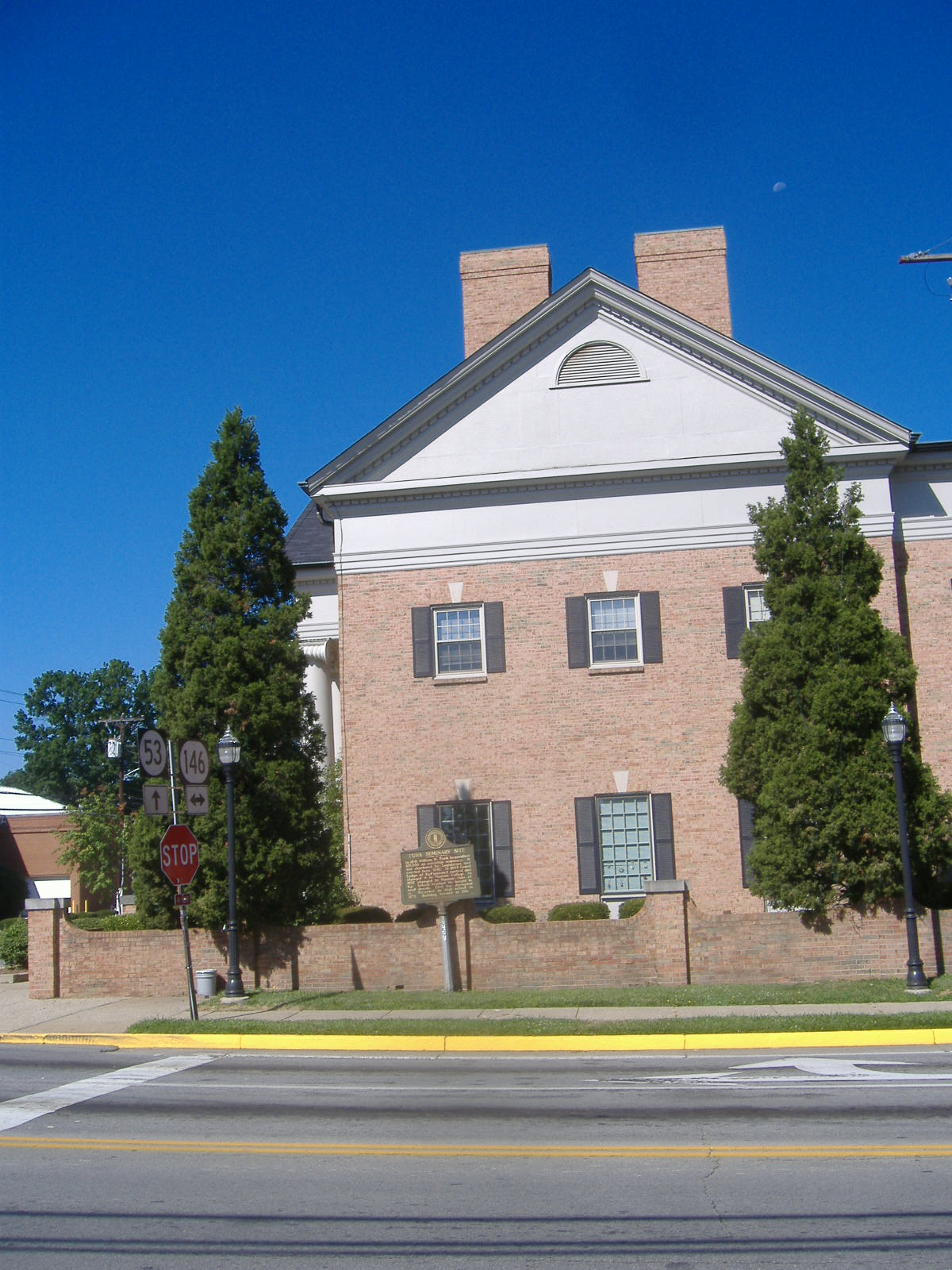
Site of the Masonic University in 2008

The Masonic University was an educational facility operated by the Grand Lodge of Kentucky in La Grange, Kentucky, located twenty miles northeast of Louisville, in the mid-nineteenth century. Among its faculty was Kentucky Chief Jurist and Confederate spy Thomas Hines, and Robert Morris, the poet laureate of Freemasonry.

== History ==
The initial money to found the school came from the will of William M. Funk, who left $10,000 for the purpose of such an institution, naming it the Funk Seminary. The Kentucky General Assembly approved of the school and chartered it in 1842. The Grand Lodge of Kentucky took control of it in 1844, and renamed it the Masonic College. It was renamed Masonic University in 1852.

The Masonic University had its greatest era in the 1850s. However, the beginning of the Civil War in 1861 severely crippled it. This is best represented by the departure of the principal of its grammar school, Hines, who left to found the Buckner's Guides, a Confederate force. It was during this time that Rob Morris began running the school (1860). His home, the Rob Morris House, still stands a few blocks southeast of the site of the university.

Eventually the Grand Lodge decided they had better uses for the money used to run the school, selling it off in 1873 in favor of concentrating on the Masonic Widows and Orphans Home, then just established in Louisville.

In 1881 the school finally closed. The building burned to the ground in 1911. The Oldham County Fiscal Court Building now stands at the site.

== Operations ==
As a means to support the school, a one-dollar donation was requested from each Freemason in Kentucky. Tuition was six dollars, but was waived for students whose father was a Mason and was either very poor, or dead.

The first president of the Masonic University was J.R. Finley, who was paid a yearly salary of $750. Finley traveled throughout the United States from 1844 to 1846 to attain "books, maps, and mineralogical specimens" from various Masonic lodges. The journey also saw fifty-eight new students for the school, including one from Spain and four from France.

Students at the school did not live on campus, but instead boarded in nearby homes. However, they never studied at the homes, but instead in the individual school rooms under the supervision of one of the professors. The schools were nonsectarian; students could attend who had no relationship to a Freemason. The commencement ceremonies, first held on July 23, 1847, were not open to the general public. Subjects taught were reading, writing, math, Greek, Latin, and bookkeeping. It was mandatory for those who attended the university due to charity to learn one of the following: carpentry, coopering, horseshoeing, horticulture, or smithing.
