= Richland, Holmes County, Mississippi =

Unincorporated community in Mississippi, United States

Richland, Mississippi
- Unincorporated community
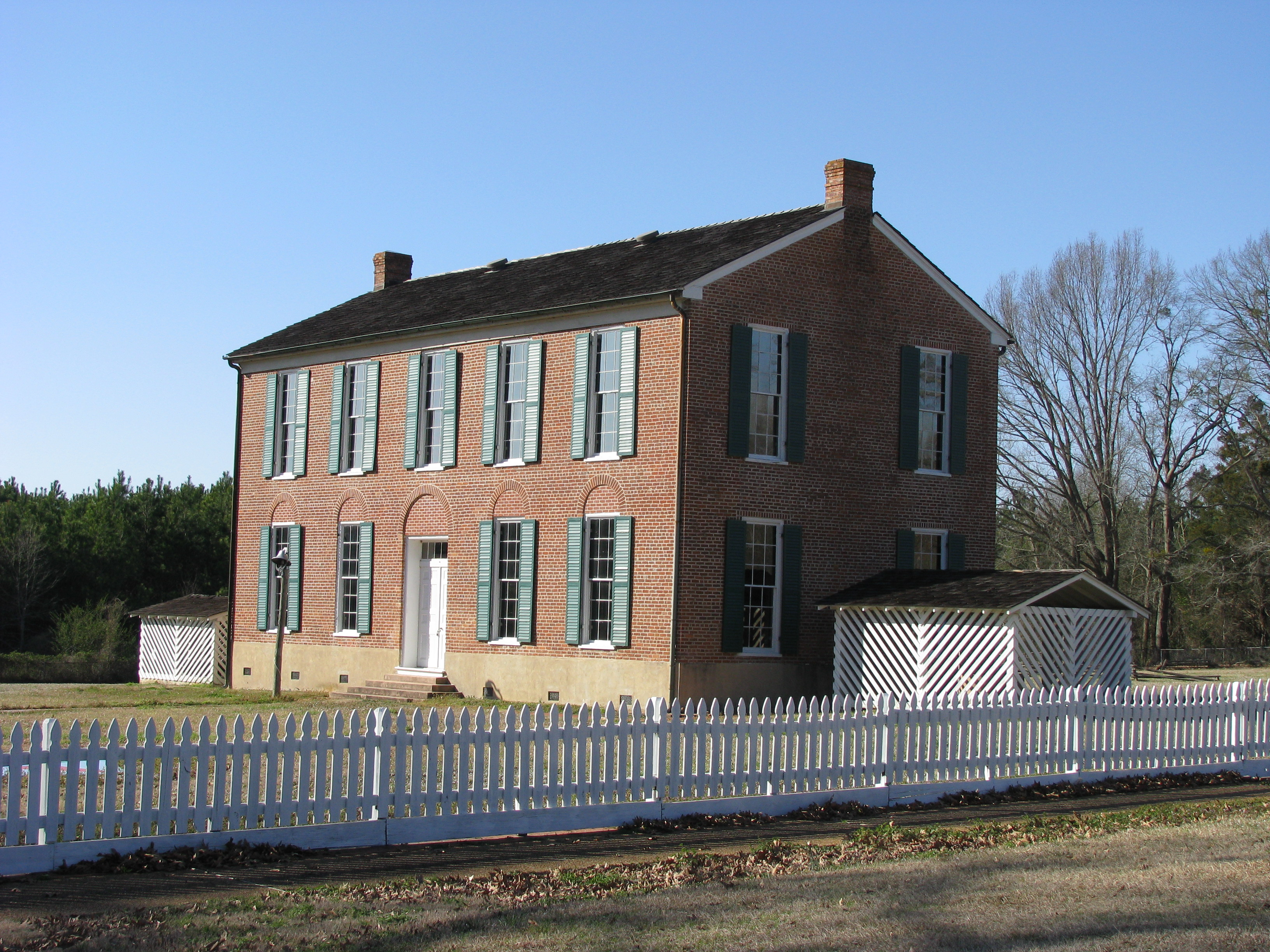
- Main façade of the Eureka Masonic College

- Location within Mississippi
- Coordinates: 32°58′27.5″N 89°59′11.3″W
- Country: United States
- State: Mississippi
- County: Holmes
- Founded: February 9, 1842 (184 years ago)
- Elevation: 325 ft (99 m)
- Time zone: UTC-6 (Central (CST))
  - Summer (DST): UTC-5 (CDT)
- ZIP code(s): 39079
- Area code(s): 662
- GNIS feature ID: 676637
- Highways: Highway 14; Highway 17
- Major airport: Jackson Airport (JAN)

Richland is an unincorporated community in Holmes County, Mississippi, located approximately 4 miles (6.4 km) northwest of Goodman and approximately 7 miles (11 km) north of Pickens.

== History ==
Richland was founded on February 9, 1842. By 1900, the hamlet was home to a church and academy. The Richland Male and Female Academy was opened prior to 1839 and was superseded by the Eureka Masonic College in 1848. The academy could accommodate 130 pupils.

=== Eureka Masonic College ===
Historic Eureka Masonic College, birthplace of the Order of the Eastern Star (OES), is located along Highway 17 in Richland. The historic schoolhouse has also housed Masons and Company C, 15th Mississippi Infantry, of the Confederate States Army, during the American Civil War.

=== 1st Mississippi Cavalry ===
The 1st Mississippi Cavalry, of the Confederate States Army, was presented with its regimental colors on September 12, 1863, a gift of the ladies of Richland.

. . . The ladies at Richland, a little village near where we are camped, sent us a very nice battle flag yesterday. It is the first flag we have ever had. It is a blue flag with a red cross extending clear across the flag from the four corners, with white stars in the cross, and a yellow border all round it. It makes a very pretty appearance. . . .

— Lieut.–Col. Frank A. Montgomery, in a letter to his wife

== Notable people ==
Blues musician Elmore James was born in Richland on January 27, 1918.

== See also ==
- National Register of Historic Places listings in Holmes County, Mississippi
