= Southern Bivouac =

Southern Bivouac was a little magazine published by the Southern Historical Association of Louisville between 1882 and 1887. Written by several former Confederate army officers, it featured tales of many of exploits never before told by the men of the Southern army. Along with the Southern Historical Society Papers, it helped to mold the beginnings of the "Lost Cause" philosophical movement.

== History ==
Southern Bivouac traces its origins to February 7, 1879, the date on which the Southern Historical Society's Kentucky chapter was created by forty-eight former Confederate officers, most prominently General Basil W. Duke. So many individuals wanted to submit papers and speeches during their monthly meetings that by 1882 it was impossible to use them all. In order to make best use of the accumulated material, it was decided in August 1882 to found a magazine, the first issue of which was proposed for publication in September 1882.

Unlike previous Southern magazines, which routinely vilified the hated Yankees, the Southern Bivouac was more "conciliatory", although it still praised the valor of the Confederate soldier and the righteousness of the Southern cause. In its first year of publication, 80% of the material was based on the Western Theater of the War, underlining its Kentucky heritage.

The Southern Bivouac also tried to discredit some Northern writers. This was best seen in the efforts to discredit biographers of John Brown. Reflecting its time, the magazine also argued that blacks had no self-respect, but would eventually produce their own poets and artists.

By January 1885, the Southern Bivouac faced financial troubles. The publishers of Home and Farm, B. F. Avery and Sons, purchased it in May 1885 and gave operational control of the magazine to Basil W. Duke and Richard W. Knott. The magazine's next issue stressed that the publication would broaden its scope to include the Southern literary tradition rather than just Southern military history. Critics praised the new direction and subscribers rose to 7,500 by the end of 1885. It also became more political, reflecting Knott's input. However, while still being a proponent of the Lost Cause, it was sometimes accused of failing to support those Southern patriots who criticized Reconstruction.

By 1887, the magazine had gained 15,000 readers, but Knott calculated it would need another 10,000 to become profitable. Thus, he sold the magazine to the Century Company, with the last issue being May 1887. The Century Company used their new asset for the publication of Battles and Leaders of the Civil War

== See also ==
- Confederate Veteran
