= Masonic Widows and Orphans Home =

- U.S. National Register of Historic Places
- U.S. Historic district
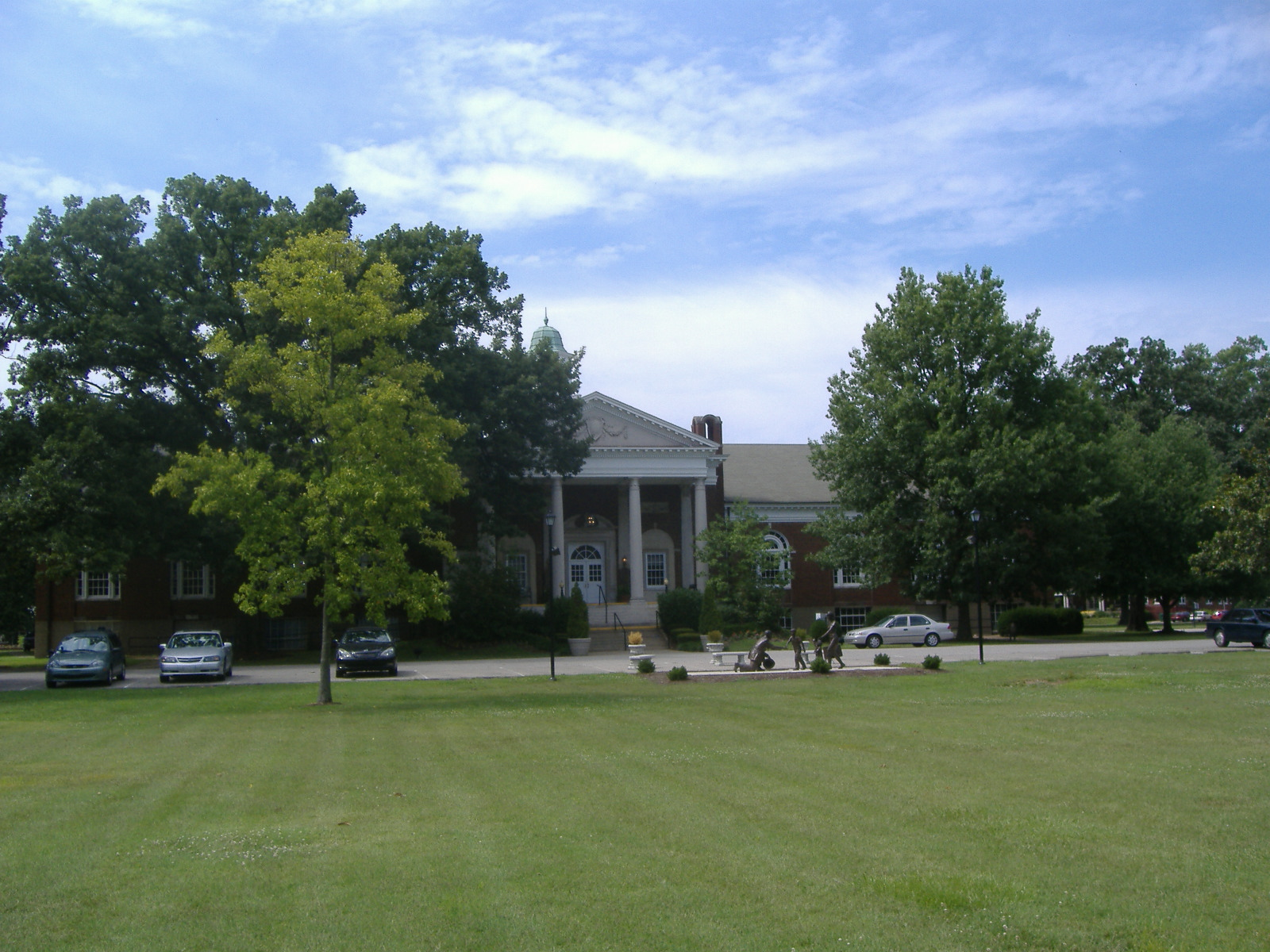
- The Olmstead

- Location within Kentucky Location within the United States
- Location: Louisville, Kentucky
- Coordinates: 38°15′16″N 85°40′3″W
- Built: 1922
- Architect: Joseph and Joseph; Olmsted Brothers
- Architectural style: Colonial Revival, Classical Revival
- NRHP reference No.: 02000916
- Added to NRHP: September 6, 2002

The Masonic Widows and Orphans Home, located in Louisville near St. Matthews, Kentucky, is a historic building on the National Register of Historic Places. It was built by the Grand Lodge of Kentucky to support the widows and orphans of Master Masons, but now is open to all senior citizens.

== History ==
The Masonic Widows' and Orphans' Home was formed in 1867 due to a discussion on November 23, 1866, pondering what to do with the number of widows and orphans of Masons caused by the American Civil War; the 1867 founding makes Kentucky's Masonic Widows and Orphans Home the oldest Masonic home in North America. It started when a group of Louisville Freemasons on November 23, 1866, gathered with an intention of creating such a home. The Kentucky General Assembly chartered the organization in January 1867. The initial starting funds for starting the home was $30,000, with additional funds totaling $20,000 and $12,000 separately. The cornerstone of the original home, located north of Avery Street between First and Second Street in what was previously a cornfield, was laid in 1869, with the first resident admitted on April 7, 1871. The building was completed in 1873. A tornado on June 2, 1875, damaged the roof and center walls of the original building, but no one was injured.

World War I and the Spanish influenza outbreak during and immediately after the war caused overcrowding. Thus, the decision was made to construct a larger orphan's home than the original in Louisville, to the present-day location in Louisville/St. Matthews on Frankfort Avenue, at the cost of $9,400,000. Construction began in 1925 on the 176-acre (0.71 km^{2}) location, and the residents moved to it on August 15, 1927. Louisville daily newspaper The Courier-Journal called it "Little City Beautiful". The largest concentration of orphans at the home was 632 in 1930. The last orphan left in 1989, resulting in the home being solely for senior care.

== Modern era ==
Most of the buildings established at the campus are still in existence. The Grand Lodge of Kentucky has its offices at the location. Until the orphans were eventually taught in public schools, originally their education was on the campus, with a cannery, farm operation, print shop, sewing room, and shoe shop there to teach the orphans a trade to support themselves in their adulthood. The St. Johns Day League Infirmary took care of sick residents. Once Kentucky state laws forbid using crops grown on the farm to feed the residents, the farm operations were sold off in 1988. The Home now accepts residents who are not related to Masons. In 2009 construction began on the property for the Kosair Charities Pediatric Day Care Center. The center opened in 2010 as Sproutlings Pediatric Day Care & Preschool.

There was another Masonic orphanage in Louisville area, established across the Ohio River in Port Fulton, Indiana (now part of Jeffersonville), on the grounds of the former Jefferson General Hospital. It also ran out of orphans around the year 1990, and the grounds were used to construct a newer Masonic temple for the local lodges and Order of the Eastern Star chapters.

== Gallery ==
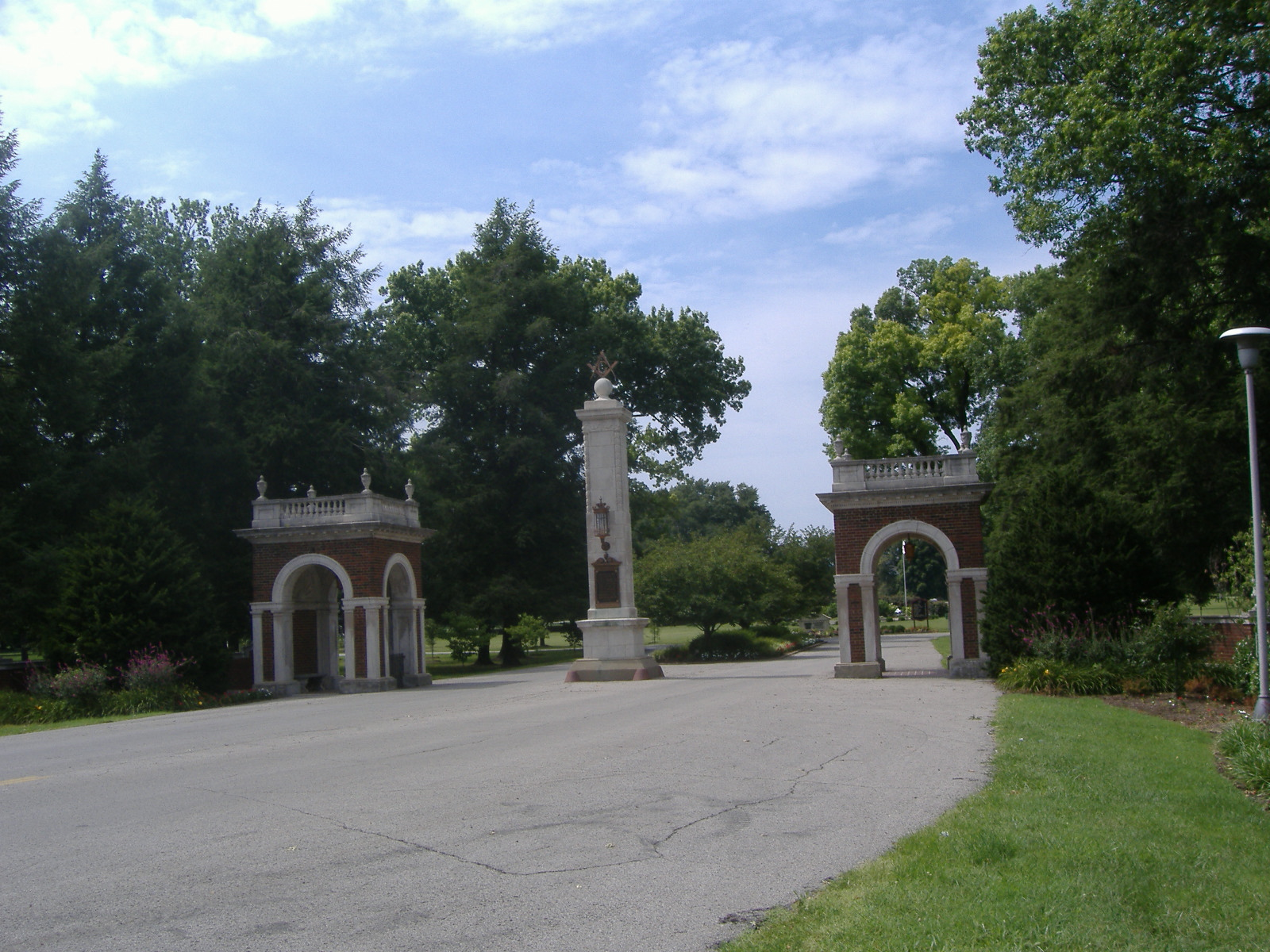
Main Gate, off Frankfort Avenue

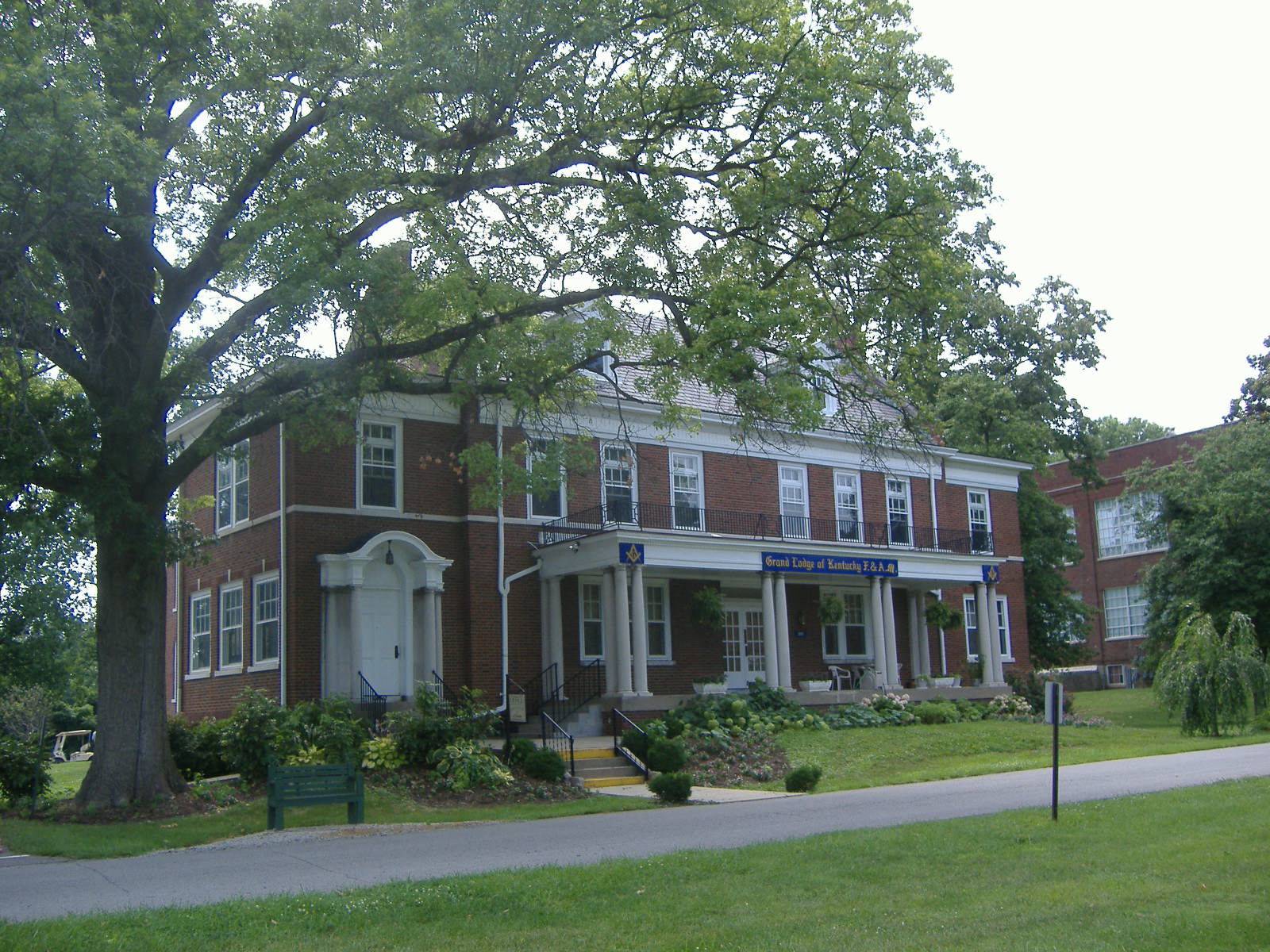
Offices of the Grand Lodge of Kentucky, on the premises
