= Grand Lodge of Kentucky =

Masonic lodge supervisory organization in Kentucky

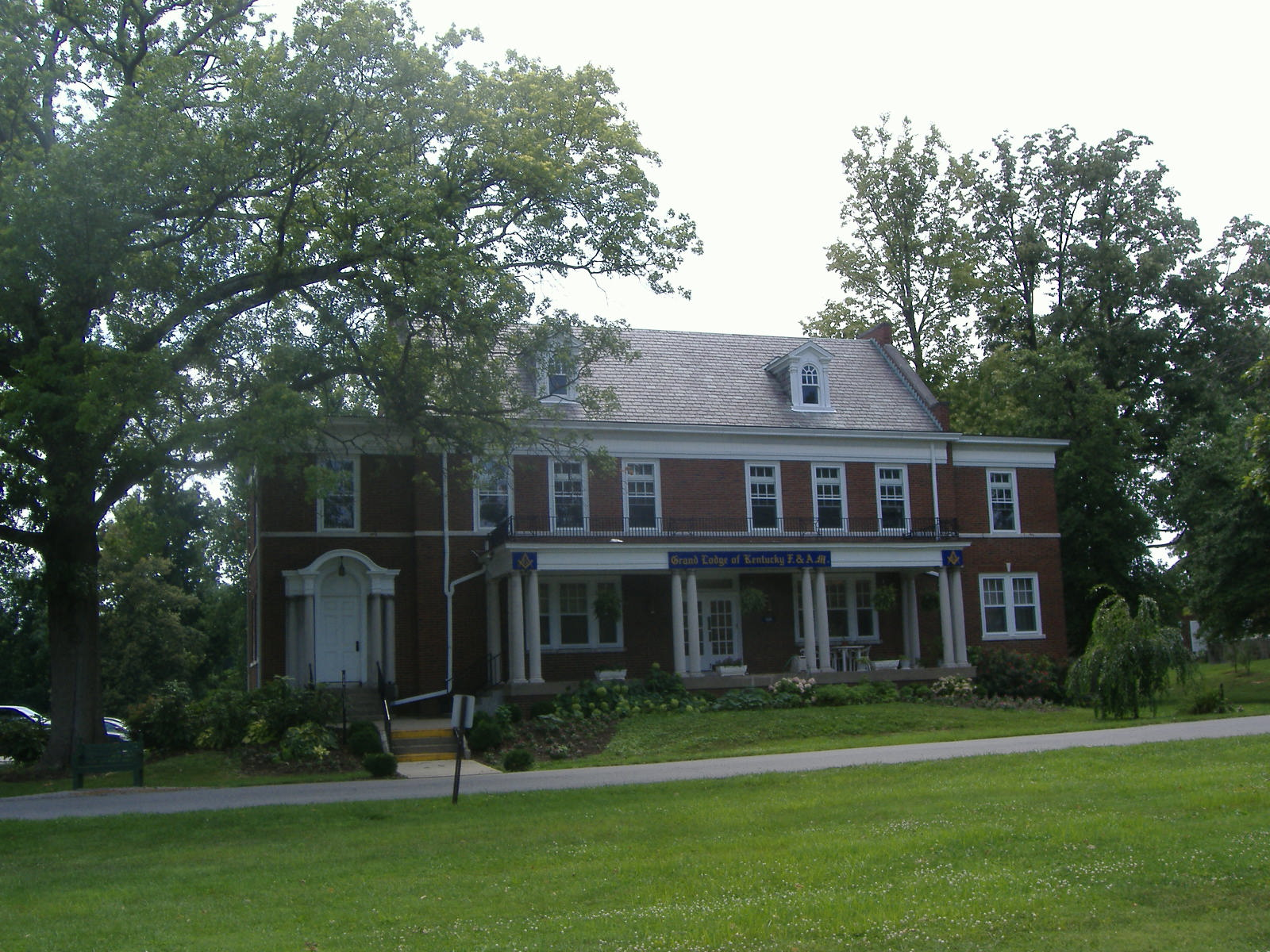
Headquarters of the Grand Lodge, in Louisville, Kentucky

The Grand Lodge of Kentucky is one of two state organizations that supervise Masonic lodges in the state of Kentucky. It was established in 1800.

The Grand Lodge of Virginia (GLVA) established Lexington Lodge #25, the first Masonic lodge west of the Alleghany Mountains, in what is now Lexington, Kentucky, on November 17, 1788. GLVA established other lodges in Frankfort, Georgetown, Paris, and Shelbyville. The process to separate from the GLVA started on September 8, 1800, and was completed to form the Grand Lodge of Kentucky on October 16, 1800; the first Grand Master was William Murray. Half of the original Grand Officers were from the Lexington Lodge, which was renumbered to Lexington #1. Members of Lexington Lodge #1 would include Henry Clay.

By the 1820s, the 55 Lodges in Kentucky had a combined membership of 1800. However, the tide of Anti-Masonry after the Morgan Affair caused a reduction to only 1300 members in 37 lodges by 1840. Membership in the 20th century was 100,675 in 479 lodges in 1961, and 83,000 in 457 lodges by the end of June 1989. By 2012, membership had fallen below 48,000. According to the 2020 edition of List of Lodges Masonic, membership had further fallen to 33,536 in that year, with only 351 active lodges.

A Grand Hall for the Grand Lodge was completed in Lexington on October 26, 1826, after plans for it started in 1813 and begun in 1824. While being built, the Grand Lodge met with fellow Freemason Marquis de Lafayette in 1825. Also among the notable events of the building was use as a hospital during a cholera outbreak in 1833, as well as the only two Indian Masons received in Lexington. After three years of discussion, the headquarters of the Grand Lodge were moved to Louisville in 1833. The Grand Hall was destroyed by fire on 1837. When a new Grand Hall was built on the site of the original on September 1, 1841, the Grand Lodge returned to Lexington until 1858, when it returned to Louisville, where the headquarters remains to this day.

After the Anti-Masonic movement petered out, the Grand Lodge founded several institutions. In 1841 the Masonic University was started in La Grange, but it closed in 1881. The Grand Lodge later founded an Old Masons' Home in Shelbyville in 1901, and a Masonic Widows and Orphans Home in Louisville in 1867, due to the number of widows and orphans caused by the American Civil War. World War I and the ensuing Spanish influenza outbreak caused overcrowding, and a larger orphan's home was constructed at the present-day location (the Saint Matthews area of Louisville), with residents moving to it in 1926. The largest concentration of orphans at the home was 632 in 1930. The last orphan left in 1989, resulting in the home being solely for senior care. Both now accept residents who do not have Masonic connections. The Home is the oldest Masonic foundation in North America.

== Gallery ==
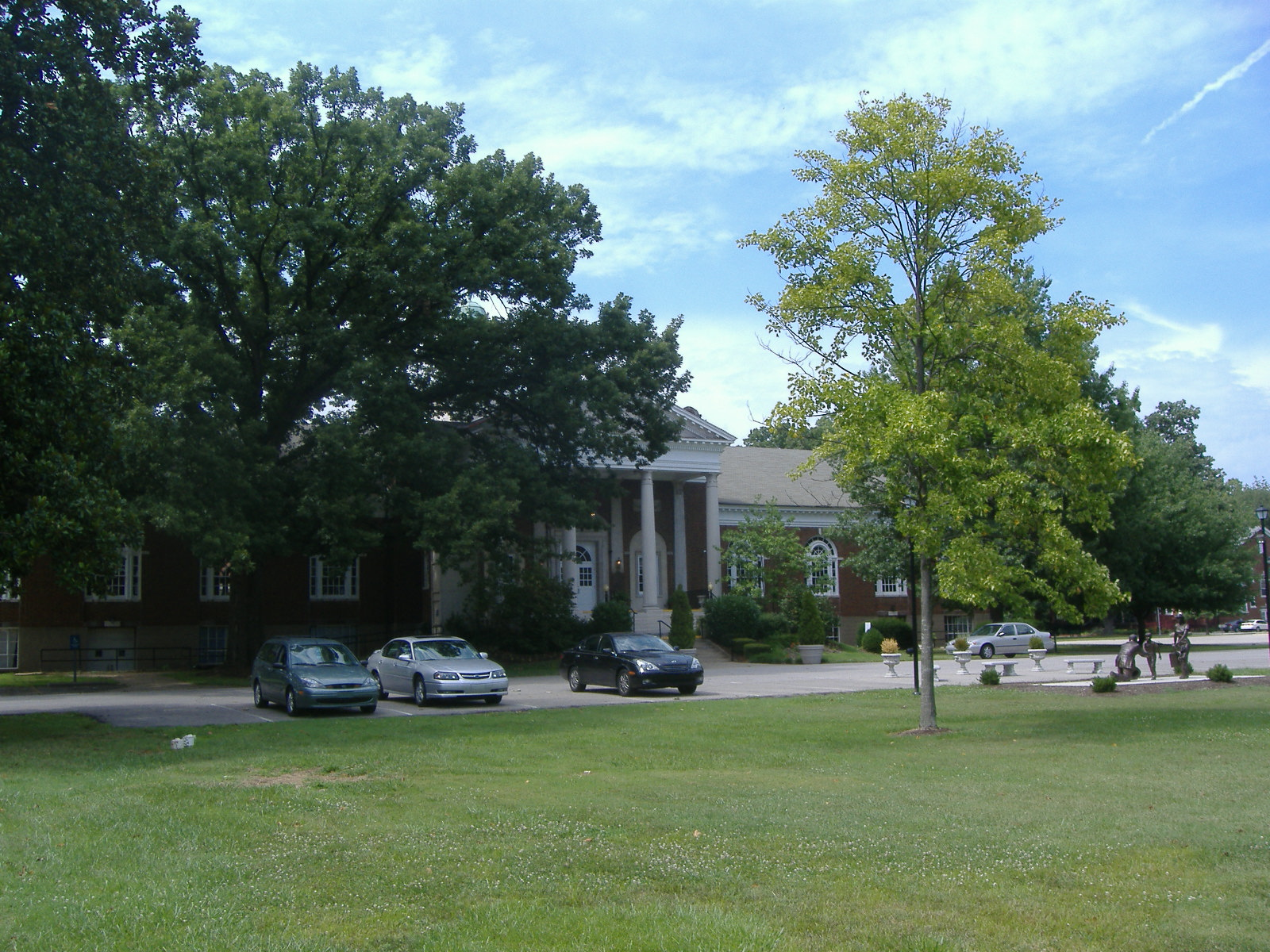
Masonic Widows and Orphans Home

== Bibliography ==
- Proceedings of the Grand Lodge of Kentucky, F. and A.M.: Grand Annual Communication. Louisville: Grand Lodge of Kentucky. 1867. OCLC 4902524.
