= List of battles fought in Kentucky =

This is an incomplete list of military confrontations that have occurred within the boundaries of the modern US State of Kentucky since European contact. The region was part of New France from 1679 to 1763, ruled by Great Britain from 1763 to 1783, and part of the United States from 1783 to present.

Several wars that have directly affected the region including the French and Indian War (1754–1763), American Revolutionary War (1775–1783), Northwest Indian War (1785–1795), Tecumseh's War (1811–1812), War of 1812 (1812–1814), and the American Civil War (1861–1865).

== Battles ==
| Name | Date | Location | War | Campaign | Dead | Belligerents |
|---|---|---|---|---|---|---|
| Unnamed battle | 1745 (three days) | modern Ft. Thomas, Kentucky | | | | Shawnee vs. Miami & Cherokee |
| Siege of Logan's Fort | May 23 – June 1, 1777 | modern Stanford, Kentucky | American Revolutionary War | Western theater | 1 | Kentucky settlers vs. Shawnee & allies |
| Siege of Boonesborough | September 7–18, 1778 | modern Boonesborough, Kentucky | American Revolutionary War | Western theater | 39 | Kentucky settlers vs. Shawnee |
| Ambush on the Ohio River | October 1, 1779 | modern Dayton, Kentucky | American Revolutionary War | Western theater | 70+ | Indigenous vs. Continental Army & citizen laborers |
| Ruddle's Station | June 22, 1780 | near modern Cynthiana, Kentucky | American Revolutionary War | Bird's invasion of Kentucky | 1–20 | British & allied Indigenous vs. Kentucky settlers |
| Long Run Massacre | September 13–14, 1781 | near modern Eastwood, Kentucky | American Revolutionary War | Western theater | ~32 | Kentucky settlers vs. Miami & allies |
| Battle of Little Mountain | March 22, 1782 | near modern Mount Sterling, Kentucky | American Revolutionary War | Western theater | 24 | Wyandot vs. Kentucky militia |
| Siege of Bryan Station | August 15–17, 1782 | modern Lexington, Kentucky | American Revolutionary War | Western theater | 5+ | Kentucky settlers vs. British & allied Indigenous |
| Battle of Blue Licks | August 19, 1782 | near modern Mount Olivet, Kentucky | American Revolutionary War | Western theater | 79 | Kentucky militia vs. British & allied Indigenous |
| Battle of Barbourville | September 19, 1861 | Barbourville, Kentucky | American Civil War | Kentucky Confederate Offensive (1861) | 8 | Kentucky home guard vs Confederate States of America |
| Battle of Camp Wildcat | October 21, 1861 | near London, Kentucky | American Civil War | Kentucky Confederate Offensive (1861) | 15 | United States vs. Confederate States of America |
| Battle of Ivy Mountain | November 8, 1861 | near Pikeville, Kentucky | American Civil War | Kentucky Confederate Offensive (1861) | 16 | United States vs. Confederate States of America |
| Battle of Rowlett's Station | December 17, 1861 | near Hart County, Kentucky | American Civil War | Kentucky Confederate Offensive (1861) | 10+ | United States vs. Confederate States of America |
| Battle of Sacramento | December 28, 1861 | Sacramento, Kentucky | American Civil War | Kentucky Confederate Offensive (1861) | 12 | United States vs. Confederate States of America |
| Battle of Middle Creek | January 10, 1862 | Floyd County, Kentucky | American Civil War | Offensive in Eastern Kentucky (1862) | | United States vs. Confederate States of America |
| Battle of Mill Springs | January 19, 1862 | Pulaski County, Kentucky | American Civil War | Offensive in Eastern Kentucky (1862) | 164 | United States vs. Confederate States of America |
| Battle of Richmond | August 29–30, 1862 | Richmond, Kentucky | American Civil War | Confederate Heartland Offensive (1862) | 284 | United States vs. Confederate States of America |
| Battle of Munfordville | September 14–17, 1862 | Munfordville, Kentucky | American Civil War | Confederate Heartland Offensive (1862) | | United States vs. Confederate States of America |
| Battle of Panther Creek | September 20, 1862 | near Owensboro, Kentucky | American Civil War | | 39 | United States vs. Confederate States of America |
| Battle of Augusta | September 27, 1862 | Augusta, Kentucky | American Civil War | Confederate Heartland Offensive (1862) | 36 | Confederate States of America vs. Kentucky pro-Union home guard |
| Battle of Perryville | October 8, 1862 | Perryville, Kentucky | American Civil War | Confederate Heartland Offensive (1862) | 1,426 | United States vs. Confederate States of America |
| Battle of New Haven | December 30, 1862 | New Haven, Kentucky | American Civil War | Morgan's Christmas Raid | 0 | United States vs. Confederate States of America |
| Battle of Somerset | March 31, 1863 | Somerset, Kentucky | American Civil War | | ~300 | United States vs. Confederate States of America |
| Battle of Tebbs Bend | July 4, 1863 | Taylor County, Kentucky | American Civil War | Morgan's Raid in Kentucky, Indiana, & Ohio (1863) | | United States vs. Confederate States of America |
| Battle of Lebanon | July 5, 1863 | Lebanon, Kentucky | American Civil War | Morgan's Raid in Kentucky, Indiana, & Ohio (1863) | 41 | United States vs. Confederate States of America |
| Battle of the Cumberland Gap | September 7–9, 1863 | Cumberland Gap | American Civil War | Knoxville Campaign | | United States vs. Confederate States of America |
| Battle of Paducah | March 25, 1864 | Paducah, Kentucky | American Civil War | Forrest's Expedition into West Tennessee & Kentucky (1864) | | United States vs. Confederate States of America |
| Battle of Salyersville | April 13–14, 1864 | Paintsville & Salyersville, Kentucky | American Civil War | | 24+ | United States vs. Confederate States of America |
| Battle of Mt. Sterling | June 8–9, 1864 | Mt. Sterling, Kentucky | American Civil War | Morgan's Raid into Kentucky | 87 (disputed) | United States vs. Confederate States of America |
| Battle of Cynthiana | June 11–12, 1864 | Cynthiana, Kentucky | American Civil War | Morgan's Raid into Kentucky | | United States vs. Confederate States of America |
| Simpsonville massacre | January 25, 1865 | near Simpsonville, Kentucky | American Civil War | | 22 | Confederate guerrillas vs Company E, 5th United States Colored Cavalry |

== See also ==
- History of Kentucky
- Kentucky in the American Civil War
