= Battle of New Haven =

Battle of New Haven may refer to:

- See Tryon's raid for Battle of New Haven (American Revolutionary War), a 1779 American Revolutionary War battle in New Haven, Connecticut, during which British forces captured Black Rock Fort
- See New Haven Battlefield Site for Battle of New Haven (American Civil War), an 1862 battle in the American Civil War in New Haven, Kentucky, which began as a raid by Confederate general John Hunt Morgan
