= New Haven Battlefield Site =

Area of American Civil War military engagement

- U.S. National Register of Historic Places
- Location within Kentucky
- Location: Lyons Station Rd. in LaRue County, Kentucky
- Nearest city: New Haven, Kentucky
- Coordinates: 37°39′42″N 85°36′4″W
- Built: 1862
- Architectural style: Rustic
- NRHP reference No.: 04000793
- Added to NRHP: August 04, 2004

Battle of New Haven

The New Haven Battlefield is the area of American Civil War military engagements at the intersection of the Rolling Fork and the former Louisville and Nashville Railroad line between Knoxville and New Haven, Kentucky. The geographic area includes the James Howell Farm ("New Haven Battlefield Site" on the National Register of Historic Places) and additional combat areas of December 30, 1862.

== James Howell Farm ==
The James Howell Farm established in 1830 was expanded in the 1840s and late 1850s. On one side of the property, the Louisville and Nashville Railroad established Knoxville branch tracks (now owned by the Kentucky Railway Museum) with a station at New Haven. After the Skirmish at New Haven and the end of the Civil War, roads on the property were cut through the path in the nineteenth century; in the twentieth they became farm roads, and eventually ceased to exist altogether, with only what is now Kentucky State Route 52 still remaining.

=== Fort Allen ===
Fort Allen, Kentucky, was named for Union Captain John K. Allen of Company H, 78th Illinois Infantry Regiment, who led the building of the stockade from October 27 to November 5, 1862, using logs set upright in the ground to a height of 7 ft (2.1 m). Army-issue Sibley tents were stockaded in at the corners, the walls between each tent were 45 ft (0.014 km) long, and a central brick "furnace" was built for cooking. The stockade was designed to hold a single infantry company. The regimental staff arrived in November 1862 and a smaller headquarters stockade and a stable for their horses were added.

After the successful defense of Fort Allen defense during the skirmish there, the 78th Illinois was transferred south in January 1863 and was replaced at the fort by the 63rd Indiana Infantry. The 63rd Indiana Infantry was transferred to Camp Nelson in January 1864 and was replaced by the 33rd Kentucky Infantry, whose commander, Cyrus J. Wilson, was Fort Allen's last commander. After the fort was abandoned in April 1864, the fort's military buildings were burned on September 19, 1864, by guerrilla Henry C. Magruder; who was captured by Wilson in April 1865 and hanged after recovering from being shot.

== Skirmish at New Haven ==
During Morgan's Christmas Raid in 1862, three companies of the 9th Kentucky Cavalry arrived near New Haven late on December 29 to destroy the Rolling Fork railroad bridge. The next morning New Haven native Captain Henry P. Housley delivered the Confederate surrender demand to Fort Allen. The fort's commander Colonel William H. Benneson of the 78th Illinois Infantry refused despite frequent surrenders when the Raid had used artillery to previously challenge Union infantry forts. The Confederates began the assault on the fort with a 12 pound mountain howitzer from 1,200 yd (1,100 m). The gun's untrained crew of detailed cavalrymen neglected to adjust the elevation and maneuvered to place the gun closer. Consequently, they overshot the fort and the town's New Haven House and Mansion House (taverns/hotels) were damaged by shells. Confederate mounted riflemen with Pattern 1853 Enfield rifle-muskets dismounted in a firing line, and when they closed to within 400 yd (370 m) of the fort, received fire from Union .69 caliber muzzle-loading rifles. After a 90-minute skirmish, the Confederate force withdrew with the howitzer and one confirmed wounded. The Union suffered no casualties and the howitzer did not damage the fort.

== See also ==
- List of battles fought in Kentucky
