= Battle of Tebb's Bend Monument =

- U.S. National Register of Historic Places
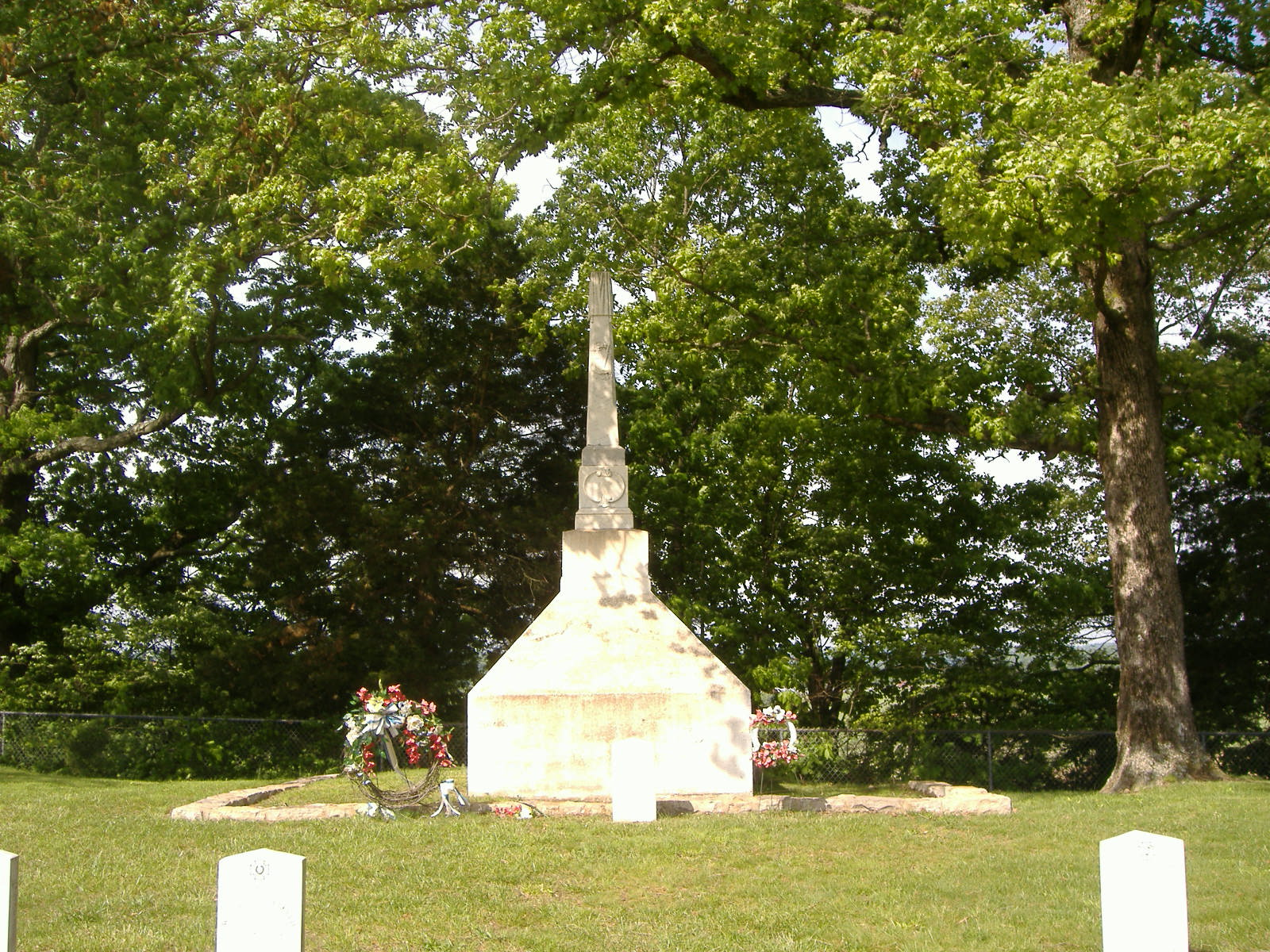

- Location within Kentucky Location within the United States
- Nearest city: Campbellsville, Kentucky
- MPS: Civil War Monuments of Kentucky
- NRHP reference No.: 97000668
- Added to NRHP: July 17, 1997

The Battle of Tebb's Bend Monument in Taylor County, Kentucky, near Campbellsville, Kentucky, commemorates the Battle of Tebbs Bend, which occurred on July 4, 1863, during the Civil War. The battle is considered a Union victory, as it greatly delayed John Hunt Morgan's famous Raid that would later go into Indiana and Ohio.

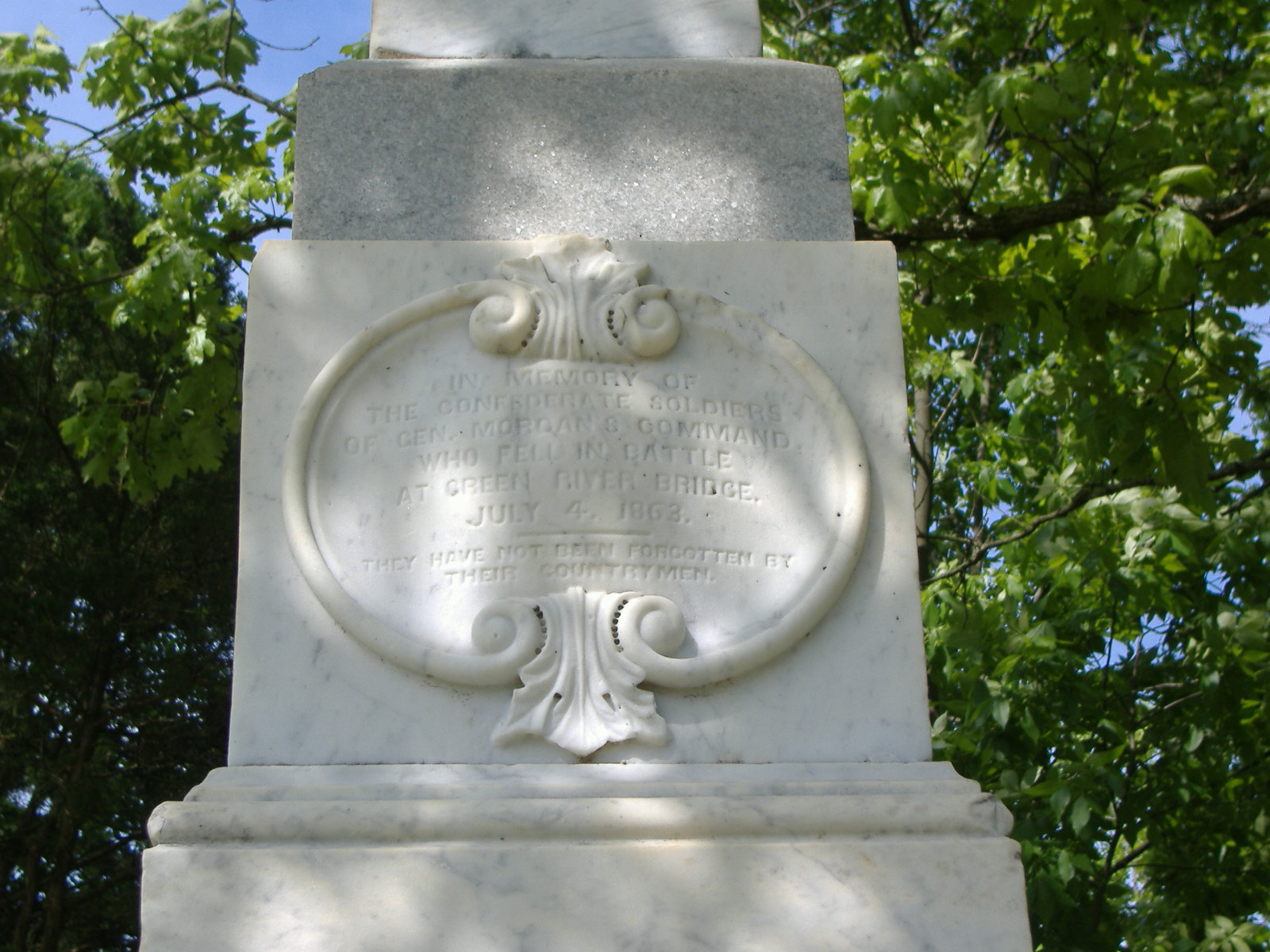
Monument inscription.

After the battle, graves of fallen Confederate soldiers were placed around the area. During the battle, James Madison Griffin had seen his house used as a hospital. In 1872 he decided to donate some land for the use of a Confederate cemetery. Various troops were reinterred here, and the monument was placed as the focus point of this small cemetery. In 1872, a public subscription sought funds to build a memorial in memory of the Confederate soldiers located there. The original monument, which cost $500, was a simple granite obelisk with inscription and a small base. On June 3, 1911, over 4,000 people from the surrounding counties gathered for Confederate Decoration Day at the monument, with the keynote speakers being ex-Union officers. The monument eventually fell into disrepair. It would be restored in the 1930s, with the enclosure gone and the obelisk placed on a wide concrete base. The state of Michigan has a historical marker at the site as well, commemorating the Union soldiers from Michigan who defended the area; most were immigrants from the Netherlands, and were given their battle commands in Dutch.

On July 17, 1997, the Battle of Tebb's Bend Monument was one of sixty-one different monuments related to the Civil War in Kentucky placed on the National Register of Historic Places, as part of the Civil War Monuments of Kentucky Multiple Property Submission.
