= Battle of Lebanon (Kentucky) =

Battle of the American Civil War

Coordinates: 37°34.128′N 85°15.406′W

- Part of American Civil War
Date	July 5, 1863
Location	Lebanon, Kentucky
Result	Confederate victory

Belligerents
United States (Union)	(Confederate States of America) CSA (Confederacy)

Commanders and leaders
Charles S. Hanson	John Hunt Morgan

Strength
350–400 of the 20th Kentucky Infantry	2,460

Casualties and losses
41	Unknown

The Battle of Lebanon occurred July 5, 1863, in Lebanon, Kentucky, during Morgan's Raid in the American Civil War. Confederate troops under Brig. Gen. John Hunt Morgan fought for six hours to overcome the small U.S. garrison before moving northward, eventually riding through Kentucky, Indiana, and much of Ohio before surrendering.

Morgan and his 2,460 Confederate cavalrymen rode west from Sparta, Tennessee on June 11, 1863, intending to divert the attention of the Union Army of the Ohio from Confederate forces occupying the state. On June 23, the U.S. Army of the Cumberland began its operations against Gen. Braxton Bragg's Confederate Army of Tennessee in what became known as the Tullahoma Campaign, and Morgan decided to move northward. Morgan crossed the rain-swollen Cumberland River by July 2 at Burkesville, Kentucky. After being defeated by Michigan troops along the Green River at the Battle of Tebbs Bend on July 4, Morgan withdrew and circled to the west, hoping to reach Louisville, then lightly defended.

Morgan surprised and captured the U.S. Army garrison at Lebanon. With minimal time to prepare, U.S. Lt. Col. Charles S. Hanson (a brother of Confederate general Roger Hanson) quickly deployed his 350 - 400 men from the 20th Kentucky Infantry behind overturned wagons, hastily erected barricades, fences, and other cover. Arriving at the town, Morgan formally requested that Hanson surrender, an offer that was refused. With a vast numerical advantage, Morgan quickly pushed Hanson's advance pickets back through the town's streets. He trapped many U.S. soldiers in the Louisville and Nashville Railroad depot, but the well-fortified brick building provided considerable protection. Morgan ordered nearby buildings set on fire, hoping to force Hanson to surrender. In a sharp six-hour fight, U.S. soldiers killed Morgan's 19-year-old brother, Lt. Thomas Morgan, during the final charge. Morgan finally captured and paroled the enemy soldiers. His men burned the offices of the circuit and county clerks and 20 other buildings.

== See also ==
- List of battles fought in Kentucky
