= Battle of Tebbs Bend =

Battle of the American Civil War

- Part of the American Civil War
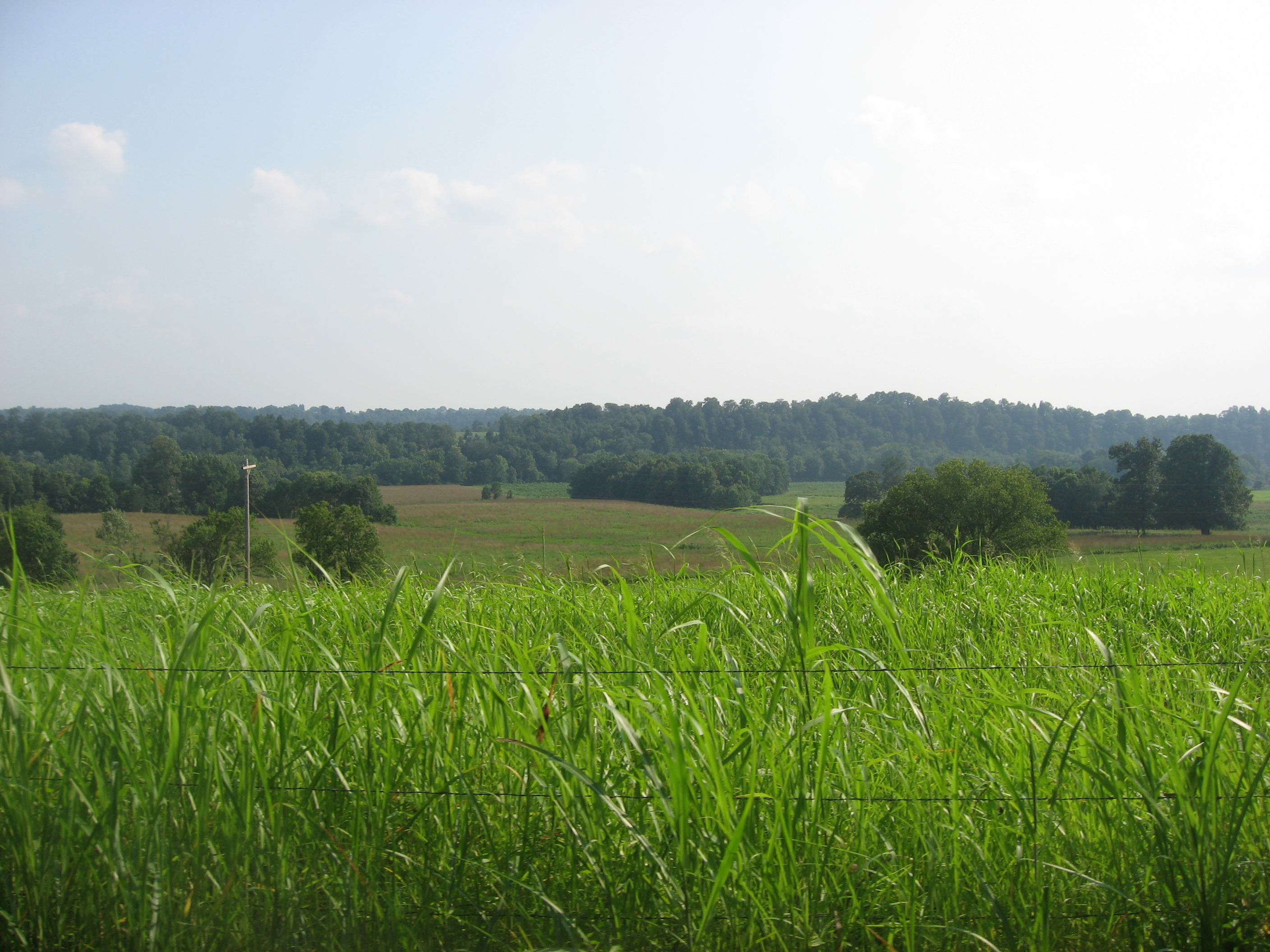
- Overview of the battlefield
Date	July 4, 1863
Location	Taylor County, Kentucky, US 37.24497°N 85.36394°W
Result	Union victory

Belligerents
(Confederate States of America) Confederacy (CSA)	United States (Union)

Commanders and leaders
John Hunt Morgan	Orlando H. Moore

Strength
800–1,000 cavalry 4 Artillery pieces	5 companies of the 25th Michigan Infantry (approx. 200 men)

Casualties and losses
35 killed 45 wounded	6 killed 23 wounded
- Battle of Tebbs Bend
- U.S. National Register of Historic Places
- U.S. Historic district
- Location within Kentucky Location within the United States
- Nearest city: Campbellsville, Kentucky
- Area: 376 acres (152 ha)
- Built: 1863
- NRHP reference No.: 99000900
- Added to NRHP: July 28, 1999

The Battle of Tebbs Bend (or Tebb's Bend or Green River Bridge) was fought on July 4, 1863, near the Green River in Taylor County, Kentucky during Morgan's Raid in the American Civil War. Despite being badly outnumbered, elements of the Union Army defeated Confederate Brig. Gen. John Hunt Morgan's dismounted cavalry.

== Overview ==
Confederate Brigadier General Morgan and 2,460 Confederate cavalrymen rode west from Sparta in middle Tennessee on June 11, 1863, intending to divert the attention of the Union Army of the Ohio from Southern forces in the state. Morgan moved northward on June 23, bound for Kentucky. On the night of July 2, he crossed the rain-swollen Cumberland River. He advanced into Kentucky, proceeding as far as Cane Valley, camping between Campbellsville and Columbia. The next day, he planned to cross the Green River at Tebbs Bend, guarded by five companies of about 200 men of the 25th Michigan Infantry led by Colonel Orlando Hurley Moore (July 13, 1827 to October 31, 1890). Moore had erected earthworks in the woods near the river crossing, guarded by a line of abatis of felled trees and several forward rifle pits. Moore aimed to protect the Lebanon-Campbellsville-Columbia Turnpike, a vital supply line and the easiest route for Morgan to reach Louisville.

Morgan divided his force, sending the bulk of his cavalry to flank the small garrison and cut off their avenue of retreat. At sunrise on July 4, Union pickets opened fire on approaching enemy cavalrymen. Soon, Morgan's artillery answered, wounding two Union soldiers in the rifle pits. About 7 a.m., Morgan called for a cease-fire and sent forward three officers under a flag of truce, demanding that Moore surrender, wishing to avoid further bloodshed. However, the Union commander refused, and firing resumed. Sharpshooters soon silenced Morgan's artillery battery of four guns.

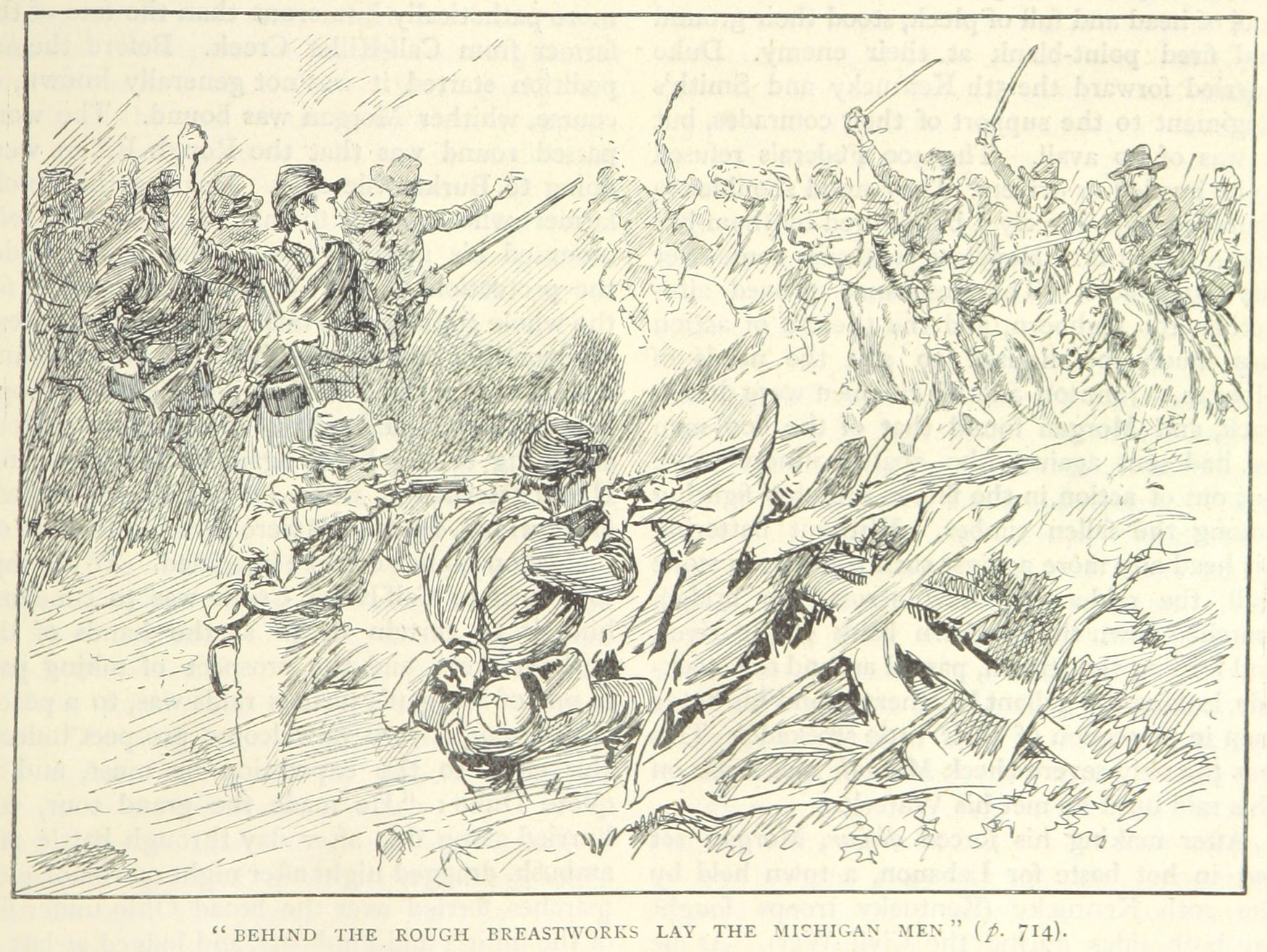
An illustration of the battle

Morgan sent forward two dismounted regiments under Col. Adam R. Johnson, about 400 troopers, who easily overran the advanced rifle pits. However, the attack stalled under heavy fire from U.S. soldiers behind the abatis. Morgan then deployed the 5th Kentucky Cavalry from Col. Basil W. Duke's brigade to support Johnson. Over three hours, Morgan attempted a total of eight separate attacks, with each one being repulsed, including the flanking column. Finally acknowledging that he could not seize the fortifications, Morgan sent another delegation under a flag of truce to Colonel Moore to request permission to collect his wounded and bury his dead. That task completed, Morgan withdrew southward along the bluffs of the Green River, finally crossing the bend at Johnson Ford and heading back towards Campbellsville. The next day, he would fight again at the Battle of Lebanon.

== Casualties ==
Morgan lost 35 killed and 45 wounded, while Moore counted 6 killed and 23 wounded. Of significance, among Morgan's casualties were 24 experienced officers, a particular target of the Michigan sharpshooters.

A Confederate Monument which says, "They have not been forgotten by their countrymen," was erected at the Tebbs Bend Battlefield in 1872. In 1997, the site was listed on the National Register of Historic Places; the battlefield was listed in 1999.

== 150th Anniversary ==
On June 8, 2013, some two hundred persons attended a re-enactment of the battle to observe the 150th anniversary of the fighting. A new marker dedicated to Confederate Private Frank Voss of Maryland was unveiled, with some of his descendants present. The ceremony was planned by historian Betty Jane Gorin-Smith and other Tebbs Bend Battlefield Association members, including its president, Cheryl Tillery. "We are here to remember those men who gave the full measure of devotion for causes in which they sincerely believed," said Gorin-Smith.

Morgan asked for a truce so that the Confederates could bring in the injured and dead, who were interred in a mass grave. According to Gotin-Smith, "It is said that the blood ran down through the yard into the turnpike road." Only the Confederate cemetery remains at Tebbs Bend; the bodies of U.S. soldiers were buried near the Green River stockade and later removed to the Lebanon National Cemetery in Lebanon, Kentucky. Gorin-Smith read a roll call of the dead buried in the cemetery and acknowledged the unknown soldiers who perished there as well.

According to a century-old newspaper clipping, on June 3, 1911, some four thousand attended a 48th anniversary remembrance of the battle. This particular gathering was reportedly the largest in the history of the Green River Valley.

== See also ==
- List of battles fought in Kentucky
- Lizzie Compton
- Battle of Tebb's Bend Monument
