= Morgan's Christmas Raid =

1862/63 U.S. Civil War action in Tennessee

- Part of the Stones River Campaign of the American Civil War
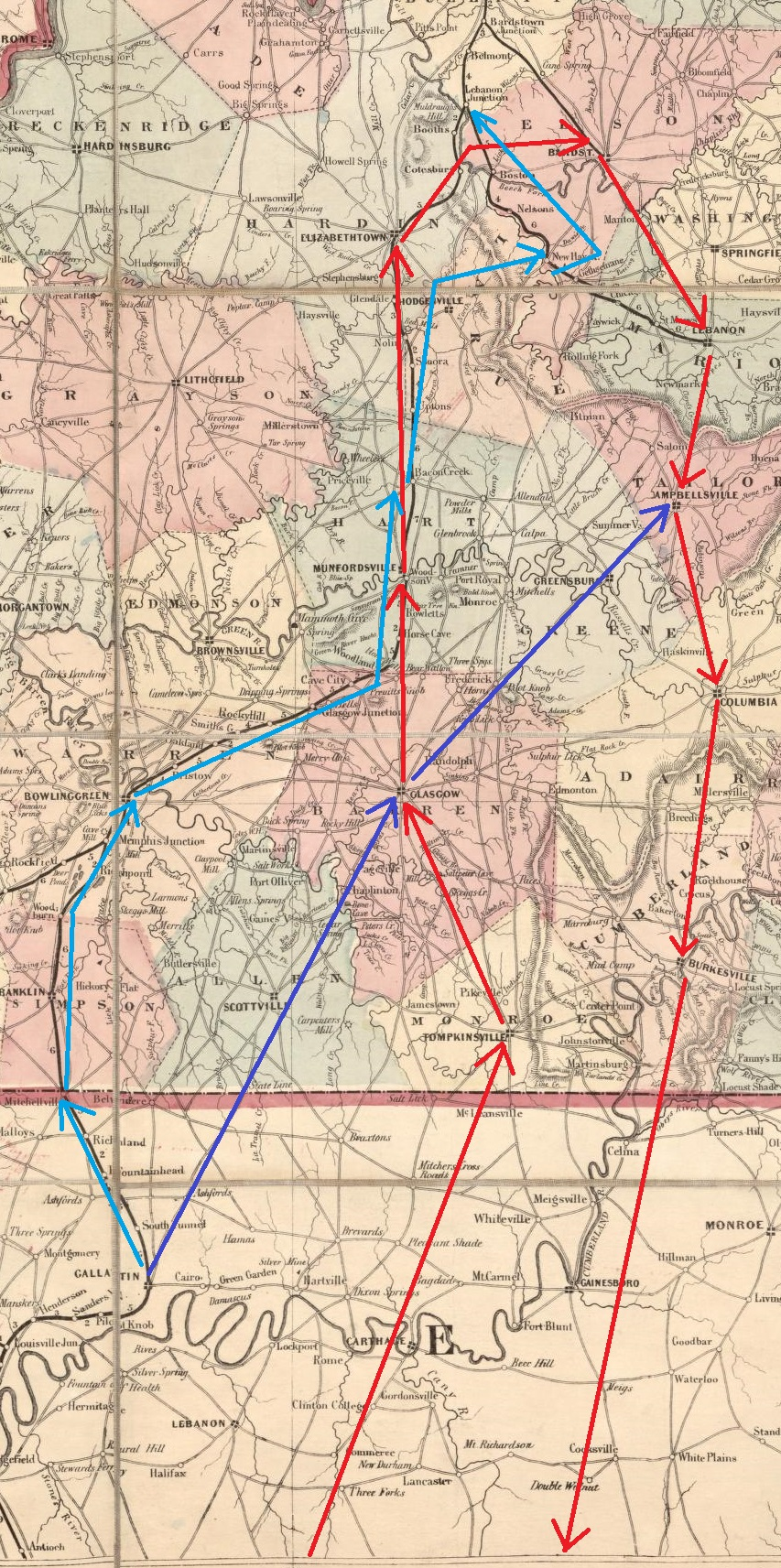
- Morgan's route in red, Reynolds' in dark blue, and Harlan's in light blue
Date	December 22, 1862 – January 5, 1863; 2 weeks
Location	Tennessee and Kentucky
Result	Confederate victory

Belligerents
United States	(Confederate States of America) Confederate States

Commanders and leaders
Joseph J. Reynolds John Marshall Harlan	John Hunt Morgan

Strength
3,000	4,000

Casualties and losses
150 killed and wounded, 1,800 taken prisoner	2 killed, 24 wounded, 64 missing

Morgan's Christmas Raid was carried out by Confederate Brigadier General John Hunt Morgan (Note: John Hunt Morgan (June 1, 1825 – September 4, 1864) was an American soldier who served as a Confederate general in the American Civil War of 1861–1865.) between December 22, 1862, and January 5, 1863. Morgan intended to cut the supply lines to the Union Army of the Cumberland in Tennessee. The Union used the Louisville and Nashville Railroad, and Morgan had identified two 500-foot (150 m) long trestle bridges at Muldraugh Hill that could be burnt. Morgan's 4,000-strong cavalry force left Alexandria, Tennessee, on December 22 and passed into Kentucky on Christmas Eve, defeating part of the 2nd Michigan Cavalry Regiment near Tompkinsville. They fought and defeated an Indiana cavalry detachment on Christmas Day at Bear Wallow, Barren County. The U.S. Army sent forces under Colonel John Marshall Harlan (Note: John Marshall Harlan (June 1, 1833 – October 14, 1911) was an American lawyer and politician who served as an associate justice of the U.S. Supreme Court from 1877 until he died in 1911. He is often called "The Great Dissenter" due to his many dissents in cases that restricted civil liberties, including the civil rights cases, Plessy v. Ferguson, and Giles v. Harris. Many of Harlan's views expressed in his notable dissents would become the official view of the Supreme Court starting from the 1950s Warren Court and onward. His grandson John Marshall Harlan II was also a Supreme Court justice.) and Major General Joseph J. Reynolds (Note: Joseph Jones Reynolds (January 4, 1822 – February 25, 1899) was an American engineer, educator, and military officer who fought in the American Civil War and the postbellum Indian Wars.) to try to catch Morgan. However, Morgan used ruses to distract his pursuers. Morgan captured a Union stockade at Bonnieville on December 26 and on December 27 captured Elizabethtown before burning the bridges at Muldraugh Hill.

Harlan's men found part of Morgan's force under Colonel Basil W. Duke (Note: Basil Wilson Duke (May 28, 1838 – September 16, 1916) was a lawyer in Kentucky and a Confederate general officer during the American Civil War. Afterward, he achieved renown as a historian. His most notable role in the war was second-in-command to his brother-in-law, John Hunt Morgan. Duke later wrote a popular account of Morgan's Raid (1863). He took over Morgan's command in 1864 after Morgan was killed. At the end of the war, Duke served among Confederate President Jefferson Davis's bodyguards after his flight from Richmond, Virginia, through the Carolinas. He was one of the most well-known "Lost Cause" historians at the turn of the 19th and 20th centuries.) near Boston at Lebanon Junction on the Rolling Fork River, on Monday, December 29. This area was home to many men in Harlan's brigade, the regiment. Despite being slightly outnumbered by Morgan's total numbers, the brigade was concentrated and outnumbered Morgan's force at Boston. Harlan effectively used it to surprise Morgan's scattered cavalry and drive them off. Duke made several spoiling attacks on Harlan's brigade to give his men time to escape across the Rolling Fork. Morgan returned to Tennessee via Bardstown, New Haven and Springfield. He bypassed a Union force at Lebanon on December 30 and burnt a stockade at Tebbs' Bend. The raid ended with his arrival at Smithville, Tennessee, on January 5, 1863.

Morgan's men covered 500 miles (800 km) in the raid, killed or wounded 150 Union soldiers, and captured more than 1,800. He had also caused more than $2 million in damage to Union infrastructure, including the railroad. In return, Morgan suffered losses of just 2 men killed, 24 wounded, and 64 missing. The raid has been described as "arguably Morgan's most successful foray of the war".

== Background ==
The U.S. Army had reestablished partial control of Tennessee in early 1862, with Nashville being recaptured by the Army of the Cumberland under Major General Don Carlos Buell in February and Memphis in June. Confederate forces were thereafter confined to the eastern and middle portions of the state. Neighbouring Kentucky had declared neutrality at the start of the war but rejected the Confederacy and reaffirmed allegiance to the Union after a Confederate invasion by Major General Leonidas Polk in September 1861.

Confederate cavalry commander Colonel John Hunt Morgan had carried out raids from Tennessee into Kentucky in 1862, recruiting volunteers from among Confederate sympathizers there. He was keen to hinder Union supply lines to the Army of the Cumberland in Tennessee and burnt the railway tunnels at Gallatin. While operating on the Union lines of communications, Morgan captured the Union garrison on December 7 at the Battle of Hartsville, capturing more than 1,800 troops.

The Louisville and Nashville Railroad was a critical logistical lifeline to Union forces in Tennessee. Newly promoted to Brigadier General Morgan proposed a raid into Kentucky to damage this railroad. His superior officer, General Braxton Bragg, gave his permission for the attack to take place.

== Raid ==
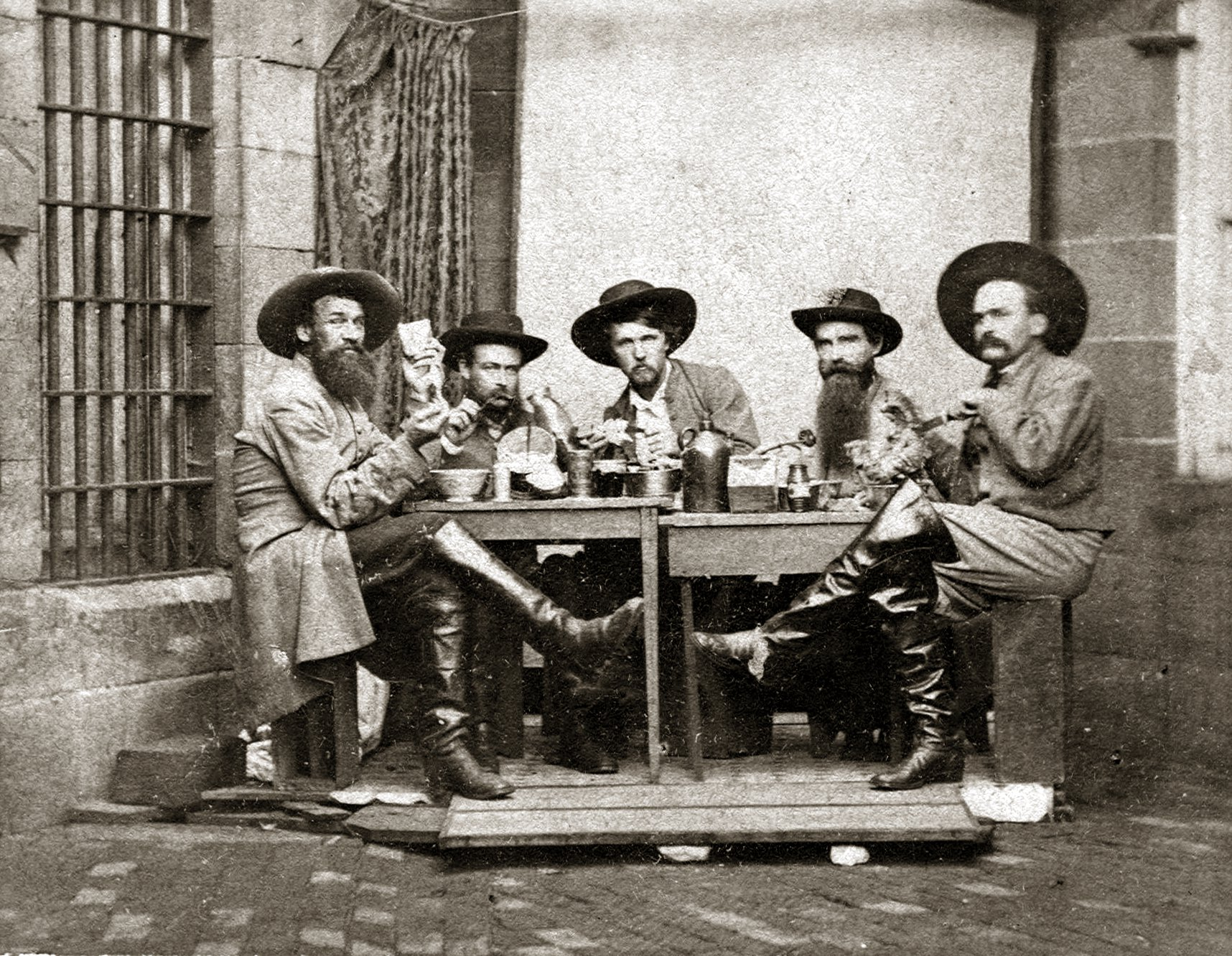
A group of Morgan's Kentucky cavalry officers, shown later in the war in Union captivity

On the eve of the raid, December 21, Morgan gathered his troops for review. He spoke to them of the dangerous nature of the task ahead. He warned that some among them "would find a grave before the expedition was over". Morgan's 4,000-strong force of cavalry, largely drawn from Kentucky regiments, with seven artillery pieces, left Alexandria, Tennessee, on December 22. Due to shortages of weapons, some of Morgan's men were unarmed, though the force carried three days' of rations. Around 400 of Morgan's men were Stovepipe Johnson's partisan cavalry; Morgan followed Bragg's advice to integrate them into regular cavalry formations rather than allow them free hand to roam the countryside.

Having progressed 90 miles (140 km), Morgan's men passed into Kentucky on Christmas Eve, near Tompkinsville. There, they defeated an advanced guard of the 2nd Michigan Cavalry Regiment before proceeding to Glasgow. On Christmas Day, Morgan's force attacked and defeated some companies of the 4th and 5th Indiana Cavalry Regiment at Bear Wallow, Barren County, taking most of the Union force prisoner.

The Union command under Major General George Henry Thomas tried to pursue Morgan. On Christmas Day, Thomas ordered John Marshall Harlan to travel by rail from Gallatin to search for Morgan's men and prevent him from progressing to Louisville. Harlan commanded around 3,000 men from his brigade, a detachment of the 11th Kentucky Infantry Regiment, and some artillery. Harlan's men were hampered by a faulty locomotive and disembarked at Munfordville. From midnight they marched the 34 miles (55 km) to Elizabethtown, which they reached at 7 am. Major General Joseph J. Reynolds' division was also deployed to the area in an attempt to safeguard the railroad.

Morgan attempted to distract his pursuers, with former telegrapher George Ellsworth tapping into Union telegraph lines to send misleading messages. He also split his force with a detachment sent to Bacon Creek Bridge near Bonnieville. This party captured a Union stockade and took 100 soldiers prisoner on December 26. With the remainder of his force, Morgan moved north and, on December 27, defeated the 91st Illinois Volunteer Infantry Regiment at Elizabethtown, taking 650 prisoners.

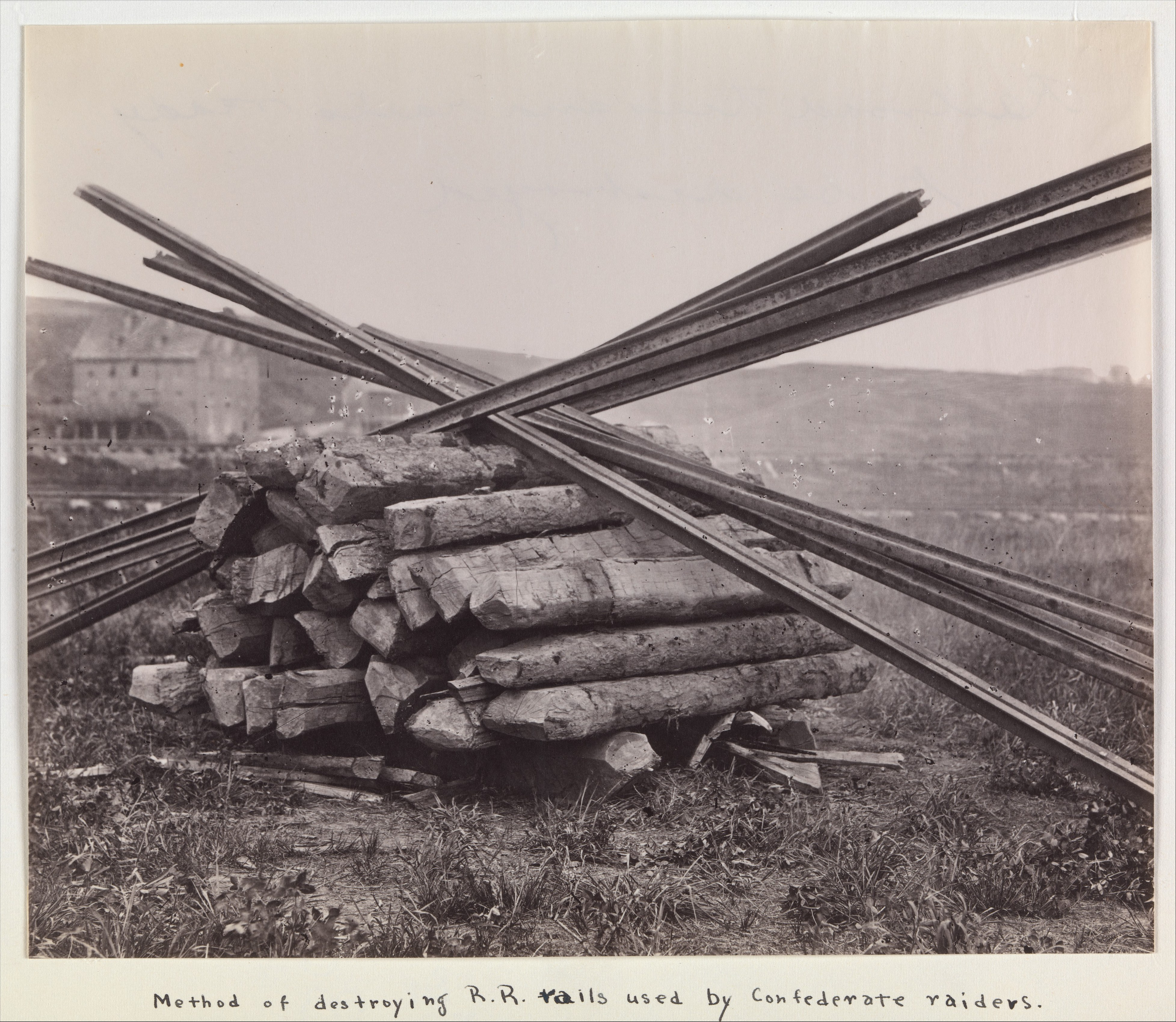
Confederate method of destroying rails by heating and bending

Morgan's force proceeded towards Muldraugh, tearing up and destroying the railroad tracks. The force reached Muldraugh's Hill and overran the defensive stockades, protecting the two bridges and taking another 700 prisoners (including 27 officers). The bridges, each around 90 feet (27 m) high and 500 feet (150 m) in length, were burnt and destroyed.

A party of Harlan's 11th Kentuckians discovered some of Morgan's men, numbering around 800 cavalry, at rest by the Rolling Fork River near Boston on December 29. The Confederate commander, Colonel Basil W. Duke, was at that time conducting a court martial. He ordered a withdrawal across the river before being wounded in the head by a shell explosion. Union artillery fire prevented a crossing until Duke's men counterattacked the 2,300-strong Union force and silenced the artillery, allowing a withdrawal.

Harlan, wary that Morgan might attempt to burn the nearby railroad bridge across the Rolling Fork, did not pursue. Morgan's men then made their way back towards Tennessee. They proceeded via Bardstown, New Haven and Springfield. A Union force prevented his passing through Lebanon on December 30, so Morgan bypassed the town at night. Heavy snow fell on December 30, which hindered Morgan's progress. Morgan continued via Campbellsville and Tebbs' Bend, where he burnt a stockade and a bridge crossing the Green River. His raid ended with his arrival at Smithville, Tennessee, on January 5, 1863.

Morgan's men had covered 500 miles (800 km) in the raid. They had killed or wounded 150 Union soldiers and captured more than 1,800, many of whom had been paroled. They had also caused several million dollars of damage to Union property, including bridges, railroad depots, water stations, and storehouses, and 35 miles (56 km) of railroad tracks were torn up. Morgan's force suffered 2 men killed, 24 wounded, and 64 missing (some of the wounded and missing later rejoined their units).

== Impact ==
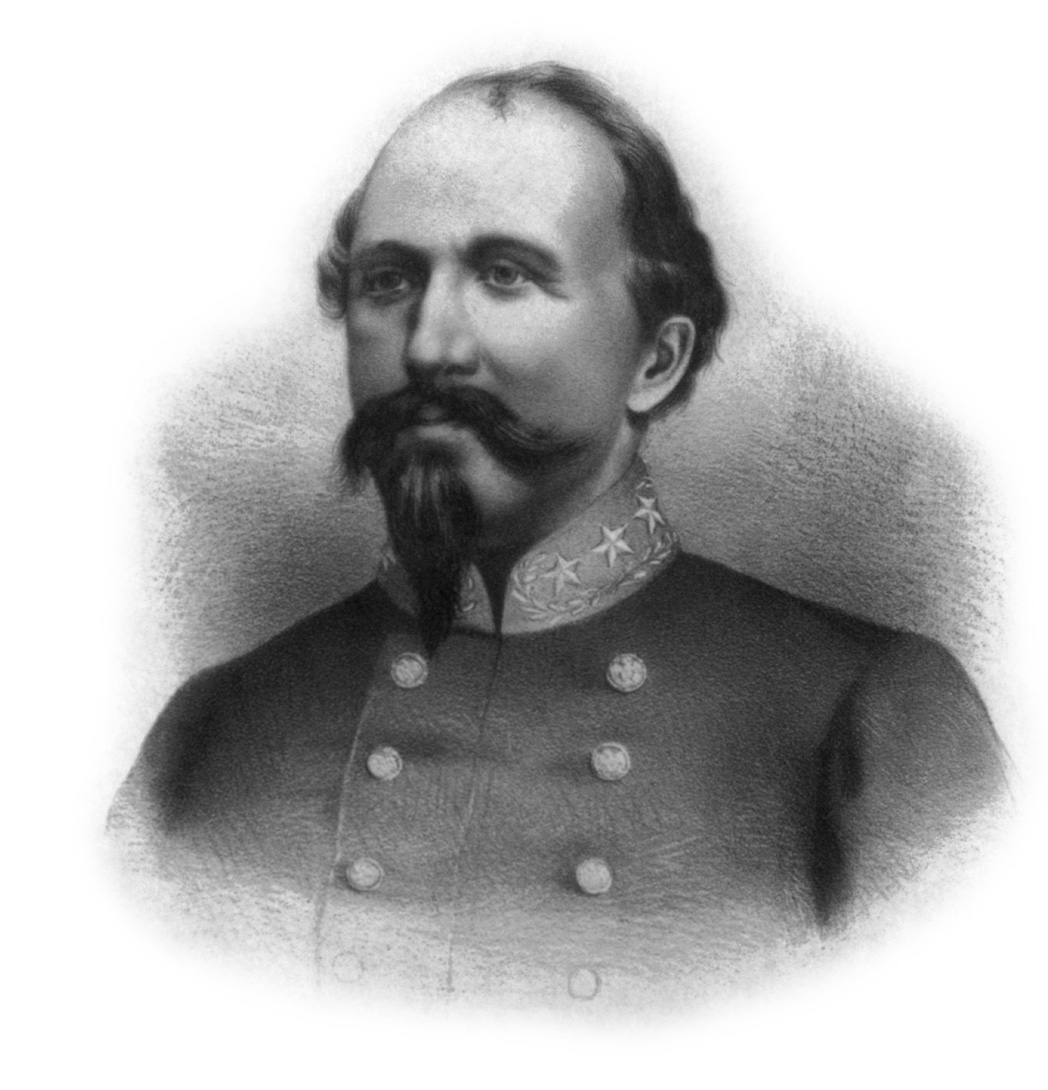
John H. Morgan

Former Virginia Military Institute military history professor Spencer C. Tucker has described the raid as "arguably Morgan's most successful foray of the war". The raid provided Morgan with large quantities of captured stores and good-quality weapons to arm his entire force. However, former West Point Academy history lecturer Robert R. Mackey considers that the importance of the raid has been overstated. He contends that Major General William Rosecrans, in charge of the Army of the Ohio, had anticipated such a raid might occur and stockpiled, in anticipation, stores sufficient to supply his army for three months. Winter rainfall had also swelled the Cumberland River, allowing Rosecrans to receive supplies by boat rather than rail. Although work on repairing the railroad bridges did not commence until March 1863, Rosecrans' supply lines had generally reached pre-raid capacity by February 1.

The raid diverted 7,300 Union soldiers from the December 31 – January 2 Battle of Stones River, where Bragg fought and was defeated by Rosecrans. It also prevented Morgan from being present at the battle, depriving Bragg of a vital means of reconnaissance. After the raid, the Union committed more than 20,000 soldiers to static defense in the Western Theater, in an attempt to prevent a recurrence.

== See also ==
- Morgan's Raid of June–July 1863

== Notes/References ==
Footnotes

Citations

References

- Belcher, Dennis W. (September 12, 2009). The 10th Kentucky Volunteer Infantry in the Civil War: A History and Roster. McFarland. pp. 49–54. ISBN 978-0-7864-5399-3.
- Belcher, Dennis W. (April 24, 2017). The Cavalries at Stones River: An Analytical History. McFarland. p. 69. ISBN 978-1-4766-2851-6.
- Cooling, Benjamin Franklin III (1997). Fort Donelson's Legacy: War and Society in Kentucky and Tennessee, 1862–1863. Univ. of Tennessee Press. p. 162. ISBN 978-0-87049-949-4.
- Durham, Walter T. (1985). Nashville, the Occupied City: The First Seventeen Months, February 16, 1862 to June 30, 1863. Tennessee Historical Society. p. 140.
- Foote, Lorien; Hess, Earl J. (2021). The Oxford Handbook of the American Civil War. Oxford University Press. p. 110. ISBN 978-0-19-090305-3.
- Harrison, Lowell H. (1975). The Civil War in Kentucky (PDF). The Kentucky Bicentennial Bookshelf (Paperback 2009 ed.). Lexington, KY: The University Press of Kentucky. p. 144. ISBN 978-0-8131-2943-3.
- Harrison, Lowell H.; Klotter, James C. (March 27, 1997). A New History of Kentucky. University Press of Kentucky. p. 202. ISBN 978-0-8131-2621-0.
- Jones, Wilmer L. (March 17, 2006). Generals in Blue and Gray: Davis's Generals. Stackpole Books. p. 268. ISBN 978-1-4617-5105-2.
- Kleber, John E. (1992). The Kentucky Encyclopedia. University Press of Kentucky. p. 651. ISBN 978-0-8131-2883-2.
- Mackey, Robert R. (August 4, 2014). The Uncivil War: Irregular Warfare in the Upper South, 1861–1865. University of Oklahoma Press. p. 151. ISBN 978-0-8061-8019-9.
- Tucker, Spencer C. (September 30, 2013). American Civil War: The Definitive Encyclopedia and Document Collection. ABC-CLIO. pp. 1329–1330. ISBN 978-1-85109-682-4.
- U.S. War Department (1887). Operations in Kentucky, Middle and East Tennessee, North Alabama, and Southwest Virginia. Nov. 1, 1862-Jan. 20, 1863. – Reports. The War of the Rebellion: A Compilation of the Official Records of the Union and Confederate Armies. Vol. XX-XXXII-I. Washington, DC: U.S. Government Printing Office. OCLC 857196196.
- "Civil War Occupation". Tennessee Encyclopedia. Tennessee Historical Society and the University of Tennessee Press. October 8, 2017.
