= National Register of Historic Places listings in Orange County, Indiana =

Location of Orange County in Indiana

This is a list of the National Register of Historic Places listings in Orange County, Indiana.

This is intended to be a complete list of the properties and districts on the National Register of Historic Places in Orange County, Indiana, United States. Latitude and longitude coordinates are provided for many National Register properties and districts; these locations may be seen together in a map.

There are 18 properties and districts listed on the National Register in the county, including one National Historic Landmark.

Properties and districts located in incorporated areas display the name of the municipality, while properties and districts in unincorporated areas display the name of their civil township. Properties and districts split between multiple jurisdictions display the names of all jurisdictions.

This National Park Service list is complete through NPS recent listings posted February 27, 2026.

== Current listings ==
	Name on the Register	Image	Date listed	Location	City or town	Description
1	Thomas Newby Braxtan House	Thomas Newby Braxtan House	June 29, 1989 (#89000777)	210 N. Gospel St. 38°33′28″N 86°28′05″W	Paoli	
2	Dixie Garage	Dixie Garage	September 16, 2001 (#01000983)	State Road 56 and Sinclair Ave. 38°33′49″N 86°36′52″W	West Baden Springs	
3	First Baptist Church	First Baptist Church	March 28, 1994 (#94000234)	Junction of Elm and Sinclair Sts. 38°33′49″N 86°36′46″W	West Baden Springs	
4	French Lick Methodist Episcopal Church		March 2, 2026 (#100012759)	537 South Maple Street; 38°32′54″N 86°37′13″W	French Lick	
5	French Lick Springs Hotel	French Lick Springs Hotel	September 28, 2003 (#03000972)	8670 W. State Road 56; 38°33′15″N 86°37′15″W	French Lick	
6	Homestead Hotel	Homestead Hotel	August 14, 1998 (#98001057)	State Road 56 between Ballard and 1st Sts. 38°34′01″N 86°36′49″W	West Baden Springs	
7	Jenkins Place	Jenkins Place	March 31, 2010 (#10000127)	448-488 Liberty Rd. 38°39′57″N 86°26′51″W	Orleans	
8	Thomas Elwood Lindley House	Thomas Elwood Lindley House	September 12, 1985 (#85002132)	Willow Creek Rd., west of Paoli; 38°33′25″N 86°29′11″W	Paoli Township	
9	Lynd School	Lynd School	October 16, 2002 (#02001169)	723 N. Lynd Rd., 0.6 miles north of its junction with State Road 56 and southeast of Orleans; 38°34′02″N 86°19′20″W	Stampers Creek Township	
10	The Maples Farm		March 2, 2026 (#100012768)	5639 US Highway 150; 38°34′35″N 86°33′58″W	West Baden Springs	
11	Newberry Friends Meeting House	Newberry Friends Meeting House	January 11, 1996 (#95001534)	U.S. Route 150/State Road 56, west of Paoli; 38°33′54″N 86°29′58″W	Paoli Township	
12	Orange County Courthouse	Orange County Courthouse	February 24, 1975 (#75000009)	Public Square; 38°33′22″N 86°28′06″W	Paoli	
13	Orleans Historic District	Orleans Historic District	September 24, 2009 (#09000761)	Roughly bounded by Wilson, Franklin, Harrison, and 4th Sts. 38°39′42″N 86°27′10″W	Orleans	
14	Oxford Hotel	Oxford Hotel	September 16, 2001 (#01000977)	State Road 56; 38°34′04″N 86°36′50″W	West Baden Springs	
15	Paoli Historic District	Paoli Historic District	November 25, 1994 (#94001355)	Roughly bounded by W. 5th, Railroad, and NE. 3rd Sts., and Lick Creek; 38°33′22″N 86°28′08″W	Paoli	
16	Shindler-Stetson House		May 24, 2021 (#100006565)	630 East Washington St. 38°39′42″N 86°26′45″W	Orleans	
17	West Baden National Bank	West Baden National Bank	September 16, 1993 (#93000950)	State Road 56, N., at the West Baden Springs Hotel entrance 38°34′02″N 86°36′52″W	West Baden Springs	
18	West Baden Springs Hotel	West Baden Springs Hotel	June 27, 1974 (#74000016)	West of State Road 56; 38°34′02″N 86°37′05″W	West Baden Springs	

== See also ==
- List of National Historic Landmarks in Indiana
- National Register of Historic Places listings in Indiana
- Listings in neighboring counties: Crawford, Dubois, Lawrence, Martin, Washington
- List of Indiana state historical markers in Orange County
