= Oxford Hotel =

Oxford Hotel may refer to:

in Singapore

- Oxford Hotel (Singapore), located at Queen Street

in the United States

(by state)

- Oxford Hotel (Denver, Colorado), listed on the NRHP in Colorado
- Oxford Hotel (West Baden Springs, Indiana), listed on the NRHP in Indiana
- Oxford Hotel (Oxford, Pennsylvania), listed on the NRHP in Pennsylvania
