= Homestead Hotel (West Baden Springs, Indiana) =

- U.S. National Register of Historic Places
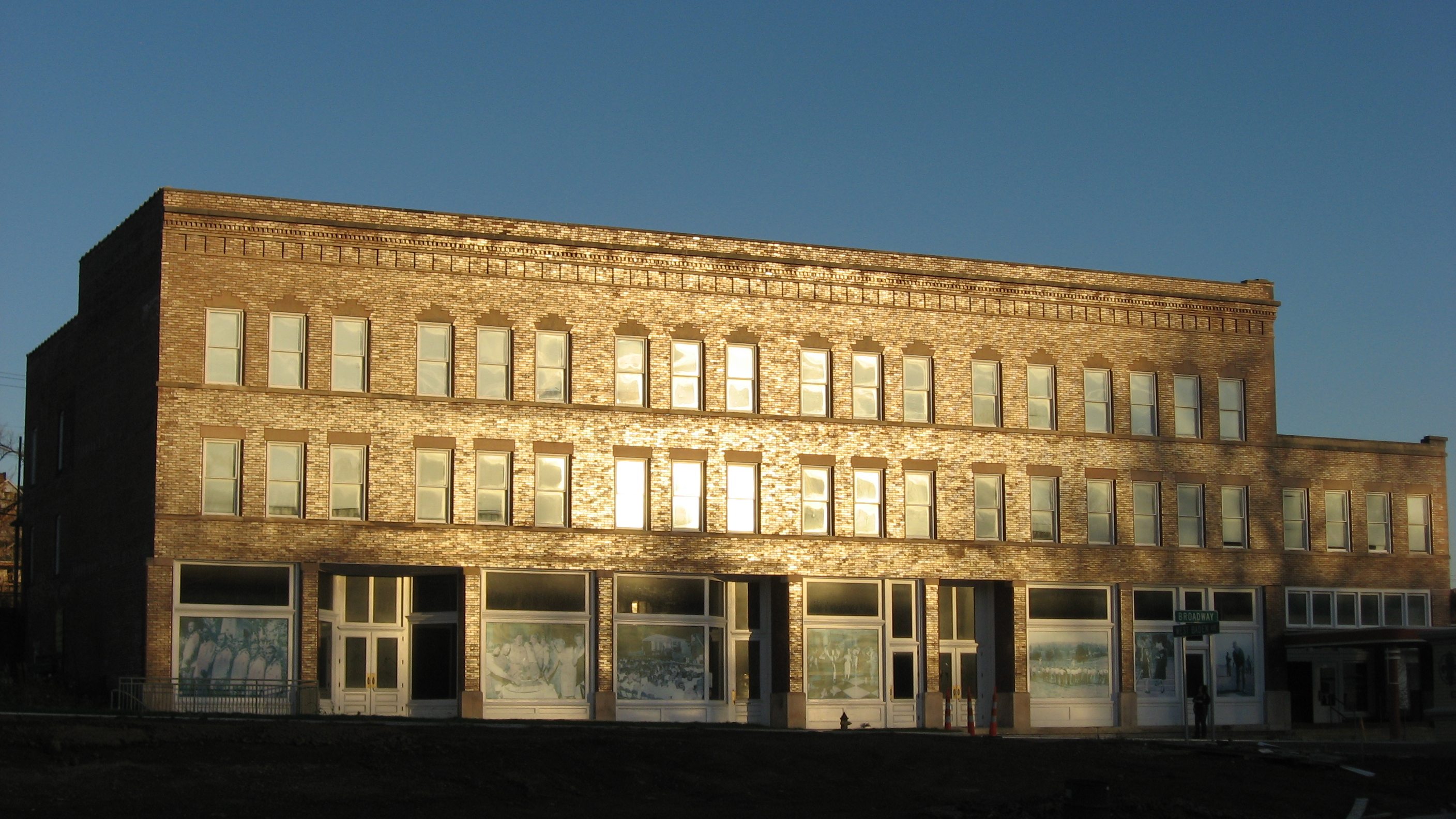
- Homestead Hotel, November 2011

- Location within Indiana Location within the United States
- Location: IN 56 between Ballard and First Sts., West Baden Springs, Indiana
- Coordinates: 38°34′0″N 86°36′50″W
- Area: less than one acre
- Built: 1913
- Architectural style: Classical Revival, Bungalow/craftsman
- NRHP reference No.: 98001057
- Added to NRHP: August 14, 1998

Homestead Hotel, also known as the West Baden Springs Hotel, is a historic hotel building located at West Baden Springs, Indiana. It was built in 1913, and is a three-story, L-shaped, Classical Revival style brick building. It consists of a 22-bay main block connected to a two-story rear wing by a one-story solarium with a 1 1/2-story cubicle pavilion.

== History ==
The Homestead was built in 1913 as a hotel with shops on the first floor and hotel rooms on the upper floors. It was one of over two dozen hotels, inns, and rooming houses that came into existence in the early 20th century near Orange County. Prior to its opening, and other similar hotels around it, the high rates at both the French Lick Springs Hotel and the West Baden Springs Hotel had made the area only accessible to the wealthy. The hotel was purchased by the future owner of the West Baden Springs Hotel, Ed Ballard, in 1919 for $1. In 1934, the hotel was bought by Ballard's cousins and renamed to the West Baden Springs Hotel. During this time, the main entrance was redesigned to include a revolving door and Art Deco canopy. Until 1976, the building functioned as a hotel until it was bought by Northwood University and converted into a dormitory. The hotel was purchased again in 1984 by Eugene McDonald, who intended to return the building to its original function as a hotel. However, his effort was unsuccessful and the property was turned over to the county. It was listed on the National Register of Historic Places in 1998. In 2001, the Homestead Hotel underwent a successful restoration effort and was converted into senior housing.
