= West Baden Springs, Indiana =

- Town
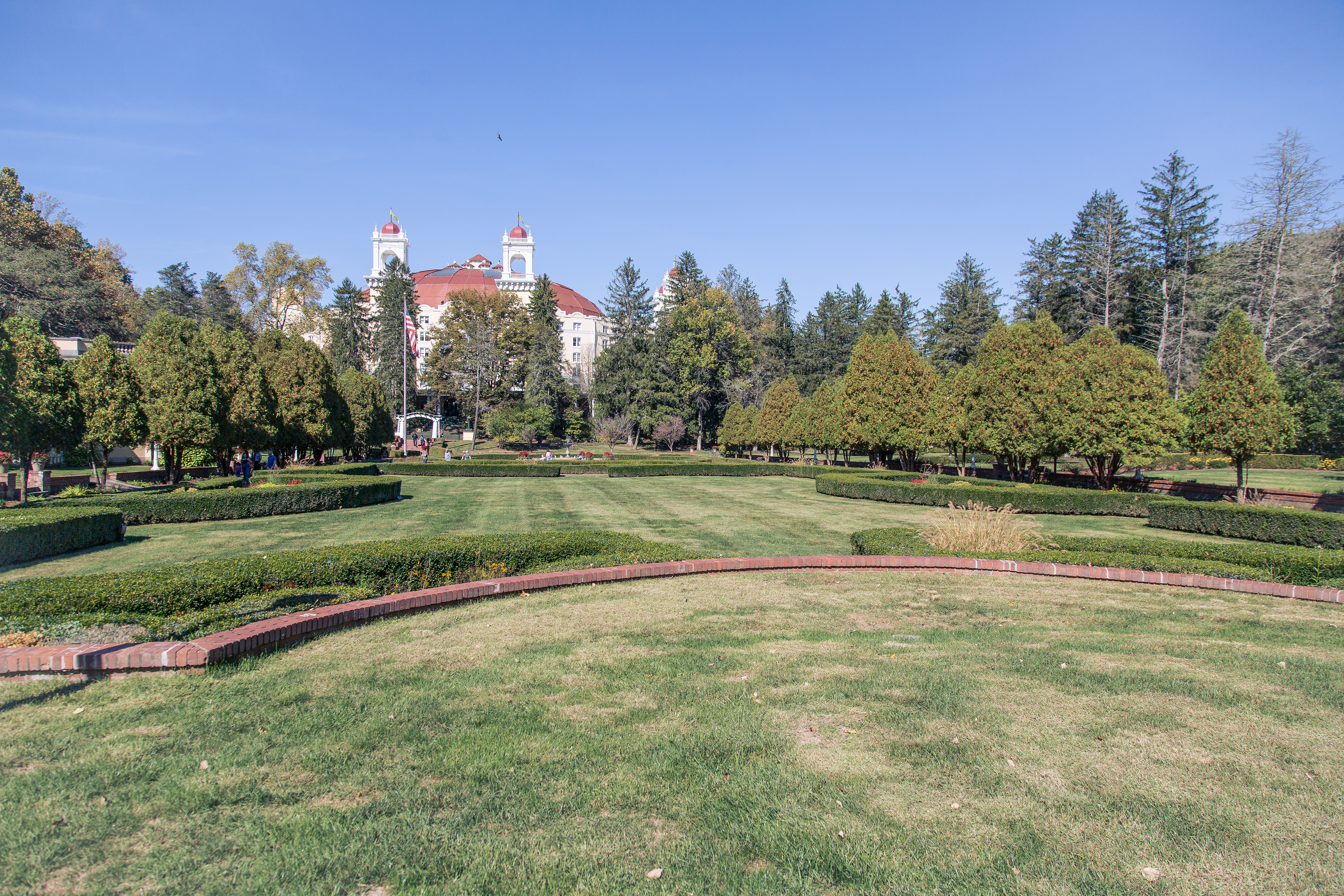
- West Baden Springs Hotel in 2016

- Flag

- Location of West Baden Springs in Orange County, Indiana.

- Location of West Baden Springs West Baden Springs (the United States)
- Coordinates: 38°34′03″N 86°36′43″W
- Country: United States
- State: Indiana
- County: Orange
- Township: French Lick

Area
  - Total: 1.10 sq mi (2.84 km^{2})
  - Land: 1.09 sq mi (2.82 km^{2})
  - Water: 0.0077 sq mi (0.02 km^{2})
- Elevation: 541 ft (165 m)

Population (2020)
  - Total: 541
  - Density: 496.9/sq mi (191.85/km^{2})
- Time zone: UTC-5 (Eastern (EST))
  - Summer (DST): UTC-4 (EDT)
- ZIP code: 47469
- Area codes: 812, 930
- FIPS code: 18-82376
- GNIS feature ID: 2397730

West Baden Springs is a town in French Lick Township, Orange County, in the U.S. state of Indiana. The population was 541 at the 2020 census.

== History ==
West Baden Springs is located in the vicinity of several mineral springs. The town was founded in the 1850s, and named after the spa towns of Wiesbaden or Baden-Baden, in Germany. A post office has been in operation at West Baden Springs since 1861.

Dixie Garage, First Baptist Church, Homestead Hotel, Oxford Hotel, West Baden National Bank, and West Baden Springs Hotel are listed on the National Register of Historic Places.

== Geography ==
According to the 2010 census, West Baden Springs has a total area of 1.098 square miles (2.84 km^{2}), of which 1.09 square miles (2.82 km^{2}) (or 99.27%) is land and 0.008 square miles (0.02 km^{2}) (or 0.73%) is water.

== Demographics ==
=== 2018 census ===
As of the census in 2018, the town of West Baden Springs resided 475 people. As of right now [when?], the results of the number of the town's households and families have not been released. The median age of West Baden Springs was 47.5 years of age. The median household income of the small town was $41,458. Between 2017 and 2018 the town's population shrunk from 526 to 475: a -9.7% decrease. The five most represented ethnic groups in West Baden Springs were as follows in descending order: White (90.3%), Black or African American (3.16%), Hispanic (1.89%), and American Indian and Alaska Native (1.47%). The average property value of West Baden is $91,600. The homeownership rate is 67.6%. The majority of West Baden Springs residents commute by driving alone and the average commute time is 17.9 minutes. The average number of cars per household in West Baden Springs is two cars.

Historical population
Census	Pop.	Note	%±
1910	746		—
1920	832		11.5%
1930	1,174		41.1%
1940	949		−19.2%
1950	1,047		10.3%
1960	879		−16.0%
1970	930		5.8%
1980	796		−14.4%
1990	675		−15.2%
2000	618		−8.4%
2010	574		−7.1%
2020	541		−5.7%
U.S. Decennial Census

=== 2010 census ===
As of the census of 2010, there were 574 people, 251 households, and 149 families residing in the town. The population density was 526.6 inhabitants per square mile (203.3/km^{2}). There were 303 housing units at an average density of 278.0 per square mile (107.3/km^{2}). The racial makeup of the town was 93.4% White, 3.1% African American, 0.5% Native American, 0.3% Asian, 0.7% from other races, and 1.9% from two or more races. Hispanic or Latino of any race were 1.4% of the population.

There were 251 households, of which 27.9% had children under the age of 18 living with them, 40.2% were married couples living together, 12.7% had a female householder with no husband present, 6.4% had a male householder with no wife present, and 40.6% were non-families. 36.7% of all households were made up of individuals, and 16.8% had someone living alone who was 65 years of age or older. The average household size was 2.29 and the average family size was 2.94.

The median age in the town was 40.4 years. 24% of residents were under the age of 18; 6.6% were between the ages of 18 and 24; 26.3% were from 25 to 44; 25.3% were from 45 to 64; and 17.8% were 65 years of age or older. The gender makeup of the town was 50.2% male and 49.8% female.

=== 2000 census ===
As of the census of 2000, there were 618 people, 263 households, and 175 families residing in the town. The population density was 577.8 inhabitants per square mile (223.1/km^{2}). There were 292 housing units at an average density of 273.0 per square mile (105.4/km^{2}). The racial makeup of the town was 94.50% White, 2.10% African American, 0.81% Native American, 0.81% Asian, 1.13% from other races, and 0.65% from two or more races. Hispanic or Latino of any race were 3.07% of the population.

There were 263 households, out of which 24.7% had children under the age of 18 living with them, 50.2% were married couples living together, 10.6% had a female householder with no husband present, and 33.1% were non-families. 29.3% of all households were made up of individuals, and 16.0% had someone living alone who was 65 years of age or older. The average household size was 2.35 and the average family size was 2.88.

In the town, the population was spread out, with 21.7% under the age of 18, 8.3% from 18 to 24, 27.7% from 25 to 44, 26.5% from 45 to 64, and 15.9% who were 65 years of age or older. The median age was 40 years. For every 100 females, there were 93.1 males. For every 100 females age 18 and over, there were 92.1 males.

The median income for a household in the town was $32,750, and the median income for a family was $40,357. Males had a median income of $29,444 versus $19,375 for females. The per capita income for the town was $14,532. About 10.3% of families and 9.7% of the population were below the poverty line, including 6.8% of those under age 18 and 13.5% of those age 65 or over.

== Economy ==
=== West Baden Springs Hotel ===
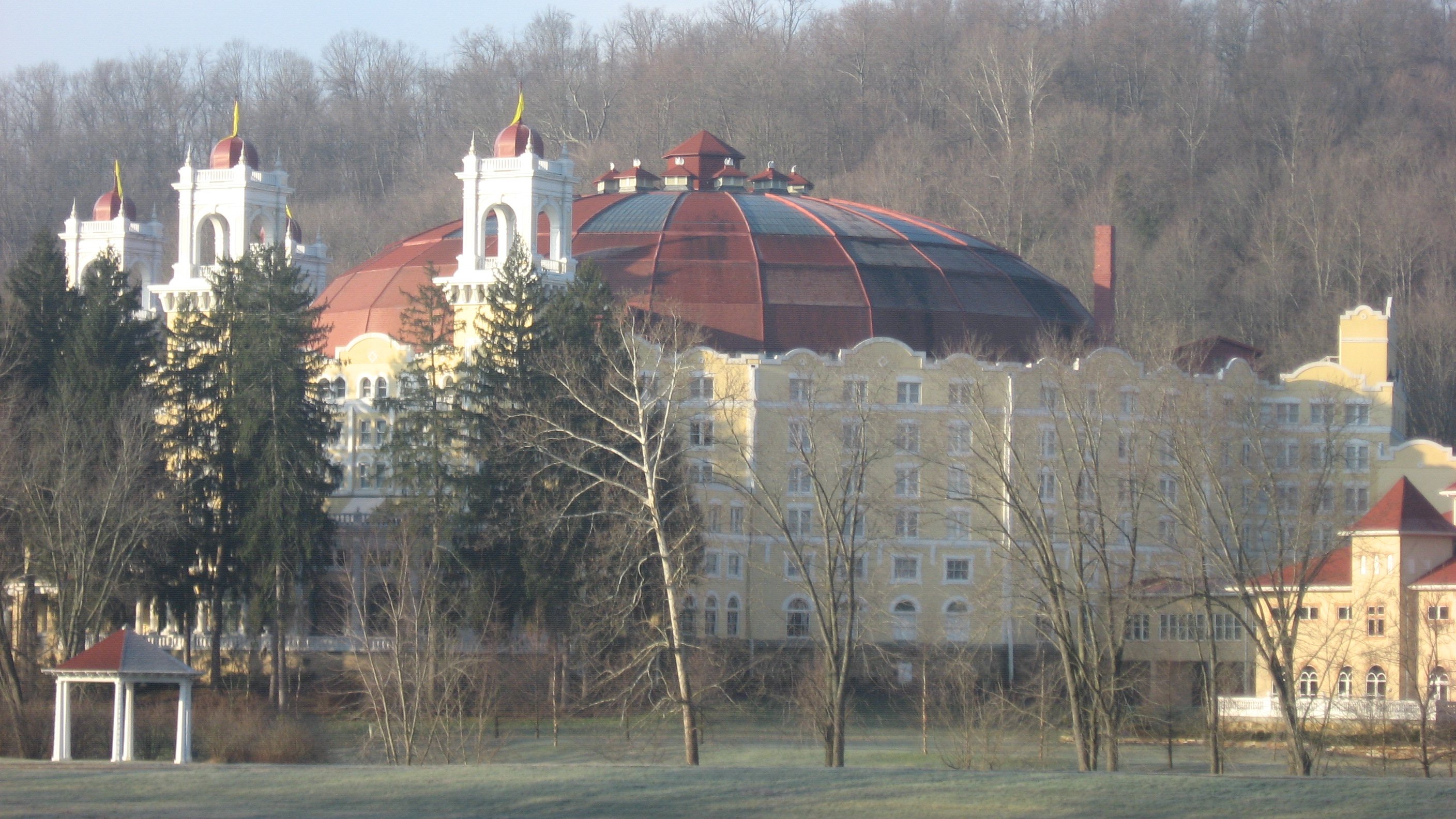
West Baden Springs Dome

The historic, 243-room luxury hotel is part of the French Lick Resort Casino complex that also includes the French Lick Springs Hotel and its adjacent casino. A gala event on June 23, 2007, celebrated the reopening of the restored West Baden Springs Hotel. (The renovated French Lick Springs hotel and new casino opened on November 3, 2006.)

Built in 1902, the West Baden Springs Hotel became known for the 200-foot (61 m) dome covering its atrium. The hotel was listed on the National Register of Historic Places in 1974, and became a National Historic Landmark in 1987. It is also designated as a Historic Civil Engineering Landmark.

== Education ==
It is in the Springs Valley Community School Corporation. The district was formed in 1957, when the schools of French Lick and West Baden consolidated. The zoned secondary school is Springs Valley High School (junior and senior high school).

The pre-1957 West Baden High School had the "Sprudels" as a mascot; the name means "springs" in German, though the mascot took a form of an elf. The school colors were purple and white. Prior to the consolidation, West Baden Springs and French Lick high schools were athletic rivals.

== Associated people ==
- Larry Bird, professional basketball player, born in West Baden Springs
