= First Baptist Church (West Baden Springs, Indiana) =

Historic church in Indiana, United States

- U.S. National Register of Historic Places
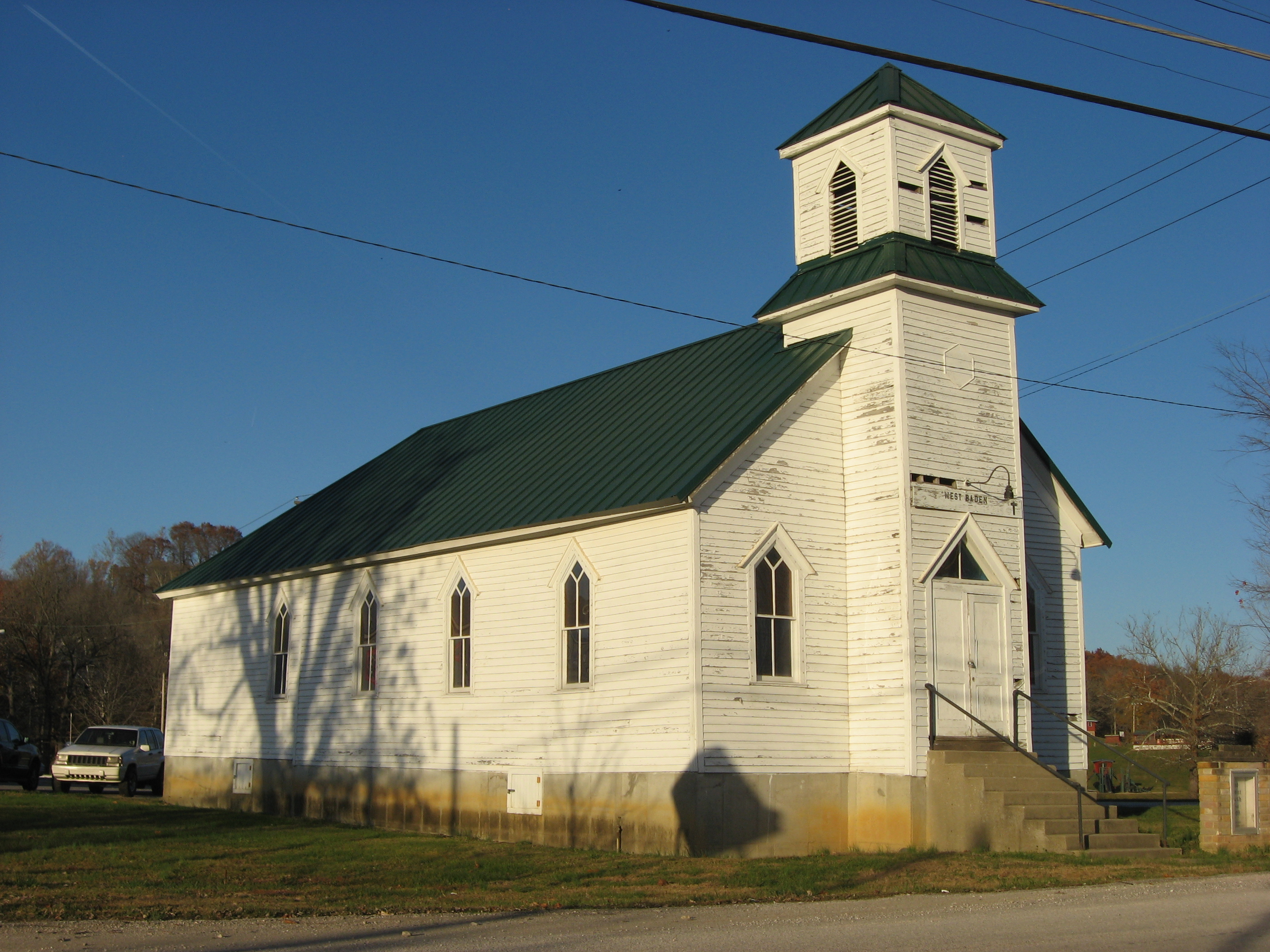
- Front and western side of the First Baptist Church, located on the northwestern corner of the junction of Elm and Sinclair Streets in West Baden Springs, Indiana

- Location within Indiana Location within the United States
- Location: Jct. of Elm and Sinclair Sts., West Baden Springs, Indiana
- Coordinates: 38°33′49″N 86°36′46″W
- Area: less than one acre
- Architectural style: Late Gothic Revival
- NRHP reference No.: 94000234
- Added to NRHP: March 28, 1994

The First Baptist Church (also known as the Negro Baptist Church and the Elm Street Baptist Church) is a historic Baptist church located at Elm and Sinclair Sts. in West Baden Springs, Indiana. It was built in 1920, and is a one-story, rectangular, vernacular Late Gothic Revival style frame building. It features a square projecting belfry. It was listed on the National Register of Historic Places in 1994. At the time of listing, the property was vacant, and owned by the West Baden Historical Society. It was deemed significant in the area of "Ethnic heritage: Black".
