= List of Indiana state historical markers in Orange County =

Location of Orange County in Indiana

This is a list of the Indiana state historical markers in Orange County.

This is intended to be a complete list of the official state historical markers placed in Orange County, Indiana, United States by the Indiana Historical Bureau. The locations of the historical markers and their latitude and longitude coordinates are included below when available, along with their names, years of placement, and topics as recorded by the Historical Bureau. There are 3 historical markers located in Orange County.

== Historical markers ==
| Marker title | Image | Year placed | Location | Topics |
|---|---|---|---|---|
| Pivot Point | | 1961 | Junction of State Road 37 and Pivot Point Road, 6.5 miles south of Paoli and 0.5 miles south of the County Road 550S junction at Pine Valley; 38°28′10.4″N 86°26′57.6″W | Early Settlement and Exploration |
| Freeman's Corner (250 feet east) | | 1966 | Eastern side of State Road 37 north of the waterworks on the northern edge of Orleans; 38°40′35.4″N 86°27′11.4″W | Early Settlement and Exploration, American Indian/Native American |
| Orleans Congress Square | | 2004 | Eastern side of Congress Square along Veterans Way Street in Orleans; 38°39′44″N 86°27′11″W | Historic District, Neighborhoods, and Towns, Early Settlement and Exploration |

== See also ==
- List of Indiana state historical markers
- National Register of Historic Places listings in Orange County, Indiana
