= West Baden National Bank =

- U.S. National Register of Historic Places
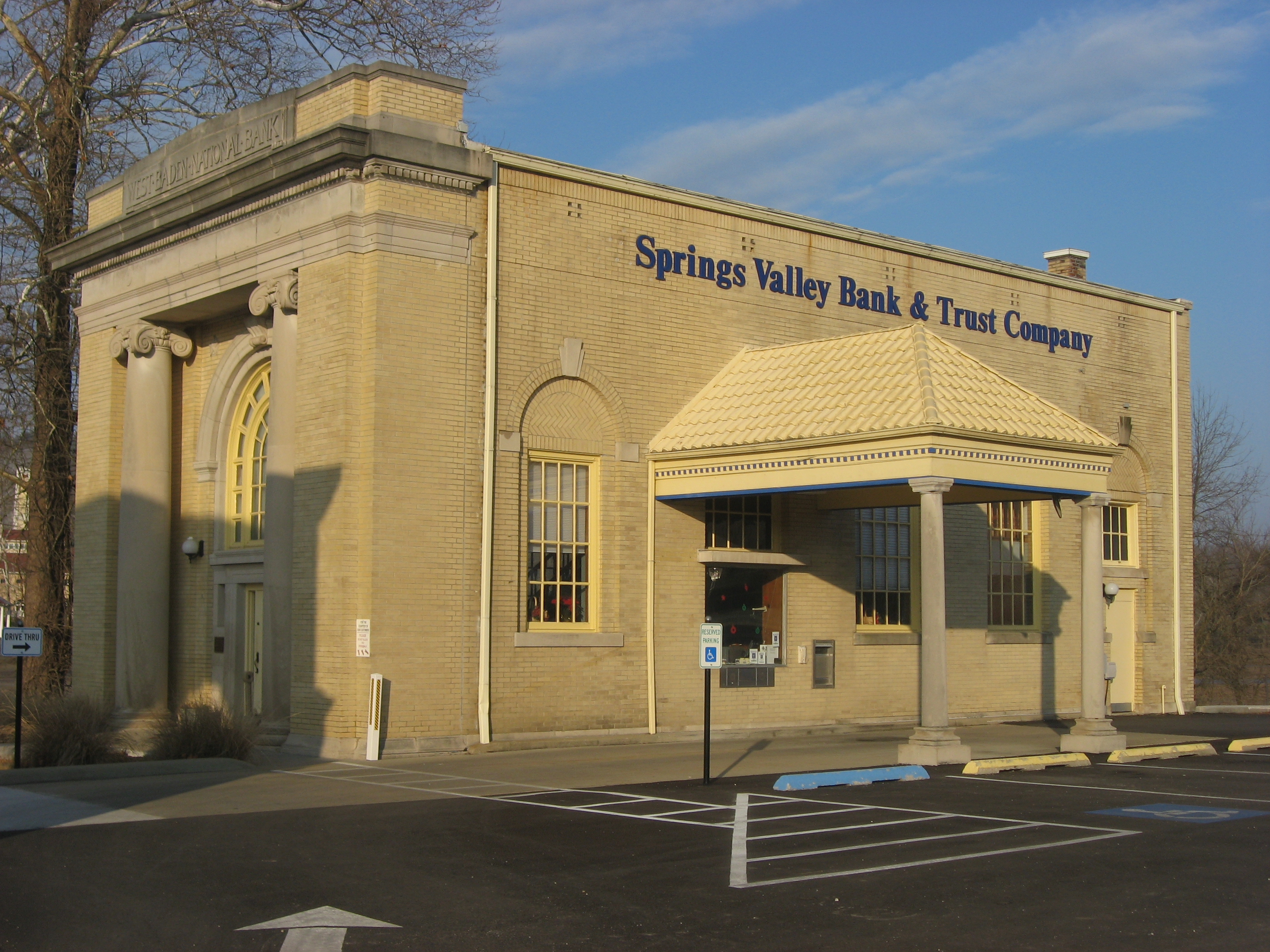
- West Baden National Bank, December 2011

- Location within Indiana Location within the United States
- Location: IN 56 N at the West Baden Springs Hotel entrance, West Baden Springs, Indiana
- Coordinates: 38°34′1″N 86°36′53″W
- Area: less than one acre
- Built: 1917
- Architectural style: Classical Revival
- NRHP reference No.: 93000950
- Added to NRHP: September 16, 1993

West Baden National Bank, also known as Springs Valley Bank & Trust Company, is a historic bank building located at West Baden Springs, Indiana. It was built in 1917, and is a two-story, Classical Revival style reinforced concrete building sheathed in yellow brick with limestone detailing. It features a recessed entry with unfluted Ionic order columns in antis, large round-arched transom window, and a central parapet.

It was listed on the National Register of Historic Places in 1993.
