= West Baden Springs Hotel =

Hotel in West Baden Springs, Indiana

- U.S. National Register of Historic Places
- U.S. National Historic Landmark
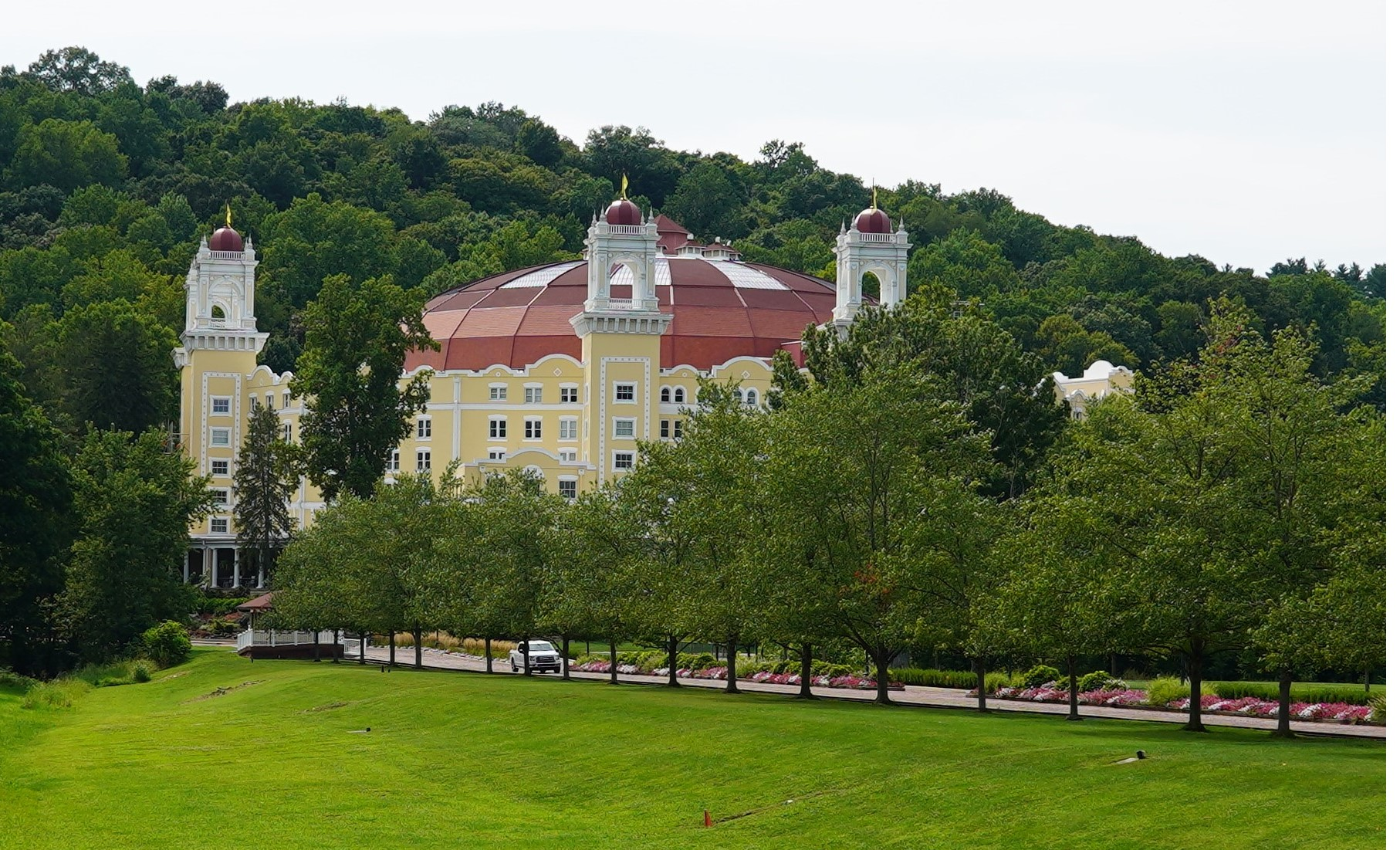
- West Baden Springs Hotel

- Location within Indiana Location within the United States
- Location: West of State Road 56, West Baden Springs, Indiana
- Coordinates: 38°34′2″N 86°37′5″W
- Area: 100 acres (40 ha)
- Built: 1901
- Architect: Harrison Albright; Oliver J. Westcott
- NRHP reference No.: 74000016

Significant dates
- Added to NRHP: June 27, 1974
- Designated NHL: February 27, 1987

The West Baden Springs Hotel, formerly the West Baden Inn, is part of the French Lick Resort and is a national historic landmark hotel in West Baden Springs, Indiana. It has a 200-foot (61 m) dome over its atrium. Prior to the completion of the Coliseum in Charlotte, North Carolina, in 1955, the dome was the largest free-spanning dome in the United States. From 1902 to 1913 it was the largest dome in the world. Listed on the National Register of Historic Places in 1974, the hotel became a National Historic Landmark in 1987. It is a National Historic Civil Engineering Landmark and one of the hotels in the National Trust for Historic Preservation's Historic Hotels of America program.

== Early history ==
Roaming bear and herds of deer and buffalo once visited the salt lick near the present-day site of the West Baden Springs Hotel as they traveled along the Buffalo Trace in southern Indiana. Native Americans also used the area as hunting grounds. Following the arrival of French traders and settlers in the vicinity, the site became known as French Lick. When George Rogers Clark passed through southern Indiana in 1778, he camped less than a mile from the salt licks and mineral springs in Orange County that became known as French Lick and West Baden Springs. The presence of salt deposits enticed the state government to consider mining large quantities of salt for early pioneers to use in preserving meat, but when it was determined that the saline content was insufficient to support large-scale salt mining, the property was offered for sale around 1832. William A. Bowles, a local physician, purchased the land that included the mineral springs and built a small inn. Constructed around 1840–45, it developed into the French Lick Springs Hotel, a popular health resort.

Bowles served as a commissioned officer in the U.S. Army during the Mexican–American War. Before his departure for military service in 1846, Bowles signed a five-year lease with John A. Lane, a physician/patent medicine salesman, who agreed to enlarge and improve the facility at French Lick. The business deal would allow Bowles to enjoy an improved facility with the potential for increased business at the lease's end, and Lane would make a potential profit from his investment. Part of Bowles' land included the mineral springs known as Mile Lick, 1 mile (1.6 km) north of French Lick. Much of the property surrounding the Mile Lick springs was marshy, subject to yearly flooding, and unsuitable to farming, but Lane envisioned it as a business area that would surpass French Lick. In 1851 he purchased 770 acres (310 hectares) from Bowles. Lane assembled a sawmill, erected a bridge to traverse Lick Creek, and built a hotel larger than the French Lick Springs, beginning the competition between the two Orange County sites.

== West Baden ==
Lane opened a hotel around 1852 near the settlement of Mile Lick and named it the Mile Lick Inn. In 1855, when the community was renamed West Baden in reference to Wiesbaden (or Baden-Baden), a spa town in Germany that was known for its mineral springs, Lane changed the hotel's name to the West Baden Inn. By the 1860s it was known as the West Baden Springs Hotel. The property was managed by Lane and Mr. and Mrs. Hugh Wilkins, with the assistance of W. F. Osborn, until 1883, when it was sold to a group of investors who made additional improvements.

In 1887 the Monon Railroad built an extension of its line to transport guests to the hotels and springs at French Lick and West Baden, where the two sites competed to offer the best service, entertainment, food and mineral water. By the late 1800s, guests arrived from across the country on seven separate railroads for relaxation and the alleged curative powers of the mineral water. The area's mineral water and baths were alleged to cure more than fifty ailments. Sidewalks led from the hotel to seven numbered springs, all of which were covered by open wooden shelters. West Baden marketed water from its onsite springs under the Sprudel Water brand name. (A gnome named Sprudel was also a part of its logo.) French Lick sold Pluto Water using a red devil as a part of its trademark.

In 1888 an investment group called Sinclair and Rhodes, which included Lee Wiley Sinclair from Salem, Indiana, and E. B. Rhodes, acquired the West Baden hotel and 667 acres (270 hectares) of land for $23,000. Although the hotel was destroyed by fire in 1891, it was rebuilt, and over the next several years Sinclair bought his partners' interest in the hotel and became its sole owner. Sinclair turned the facility into an elaborate resort. Advertised as the Carlsbad of America, the cosmopolitan resort included a casino, an opera house, and a covered, two-deck, one-third-mile oval bicycle and pony track. A lighted baseball diamond in the center of the track was used as the spring training grounds for several major league teams including the Cincinnati Reds, Chicago Cubs, and Pittsburgh Pirates, among others.

The hotel caught fire on June 14, 1901, but no guests were injured. Sinclair invited Thomas Taggart, the new owner of the French Lick Springs Hotel, to buy the West Baden property, but Taggart rebuffed the offer, boasting that he would expand his facility to handle more guests. Sinclair, who was outraged, decided to build a new, circular-shaped hotel that would be fireproof and have a large dome. His goal was to open the new hotel within a year.

Most building professionals rejected the idea of a 200-foot (61 m) dome, but Harrison Albright an architect from West Virginia, designed the building. Oliver Westcott, a bridge engineer, designed the dome's trusses. To complete the structure before the first anniversary of the fire, a 500-man crew worked six days a week in ten-hour shifts for 270 days at a total cost of $414,000.

== Eighth Wonder ==
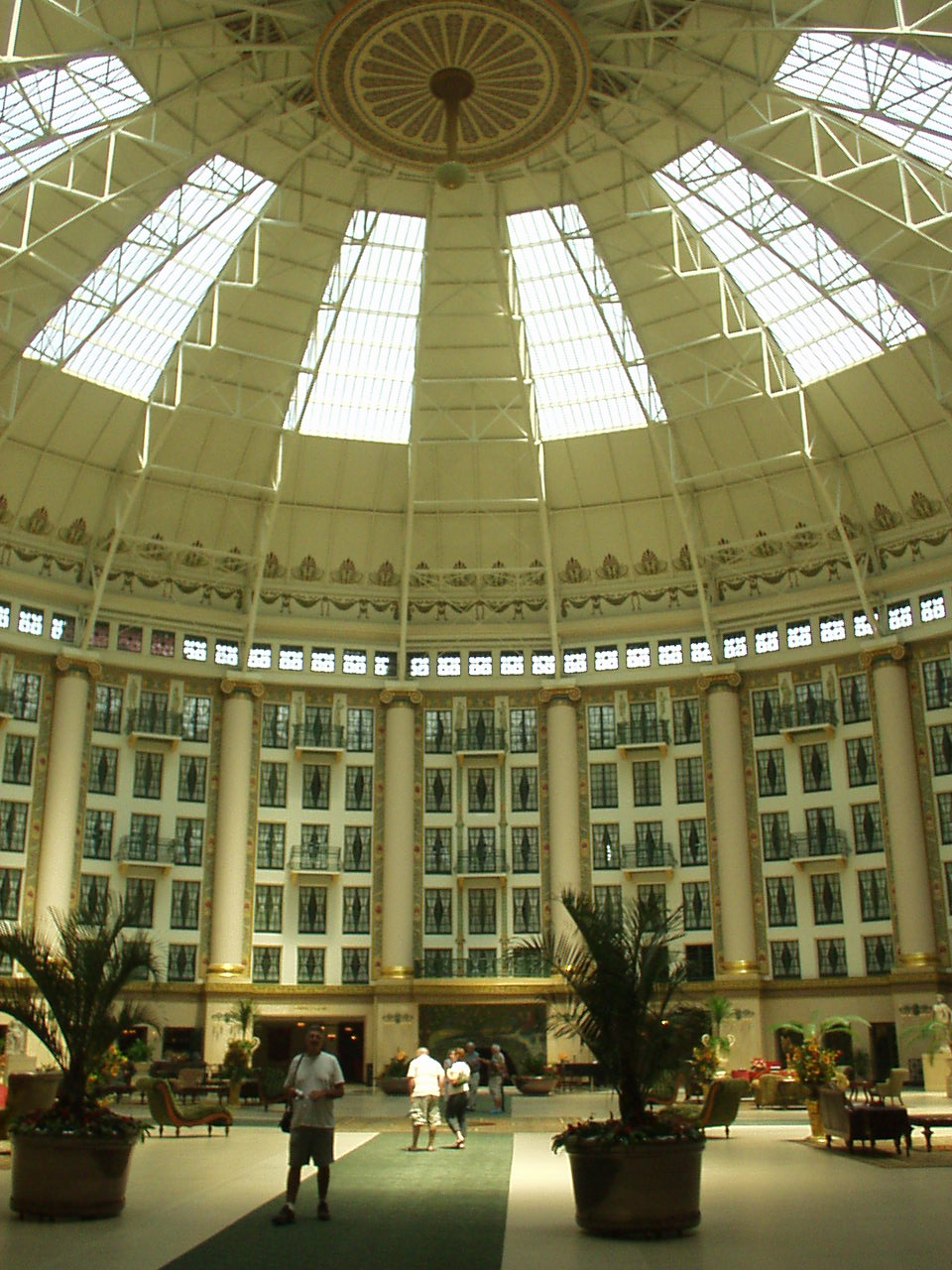
West Baden Springs Hotel Atrium

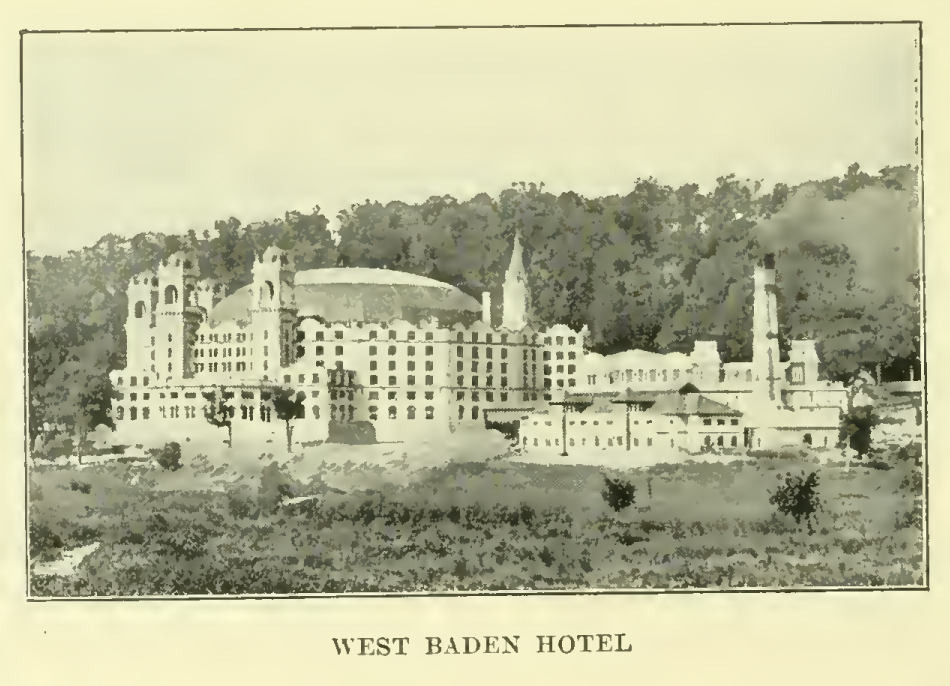
West Baden Springs Hotel, circa 1909

The new hotel opened on September 15, 1902, to rave reviews. Its formal dedication took place on April 16, 1903, with Indiana governor Winfield T. Durbin and U.S. Senator Charles W. Fairbanks delivering speeches at the event. Advertisements called it the Eighth Wonder of the World. Hotel amenities included a gambling casino and live theater performance every night, as well as opera, concerts, movies, bowling, and billiards. Palm trees grew in the huge atrium, where birds had free range and guests relaxed on overstuffed furniture grouped in clusters under the 200-foot (61 m) dome. The massive fireplace in the atrium could accommodate logs as long as 14 feet (4.3 m). Outdoors, guests had their choice of a natatorium, two golf courses, horseback riding, baseball, several hiking trails, or bicycling on a covered, double-decked oval track. (At 1,760 feet (540 m), the track was the largest in the country.) To cater to their well-heeled clientele, the hotel's facilities also included a bank and a stock brokerage. A trolley transported guests from the hotel's front door to nearby French Lick.

Some early advertisements claimed the hotel had more than 700 rooms, but most sources report the total was around 500. The main building contained six floors. The ground floor held the lobby, hotel management offices, the dining area, shops and meeting rooms; saunas and mineral baths were located on the top floor; guest rooms, built in two concentric circles around the atrium, were located on the second through fifth floors. Rooms on the inner ring offered a view of the atrium, while forty rooms on floors four and six had balconies overlooking the atrium. The hotel rooms were small by modern standards. Most had one or two twin beds and lacked a private bathroom.

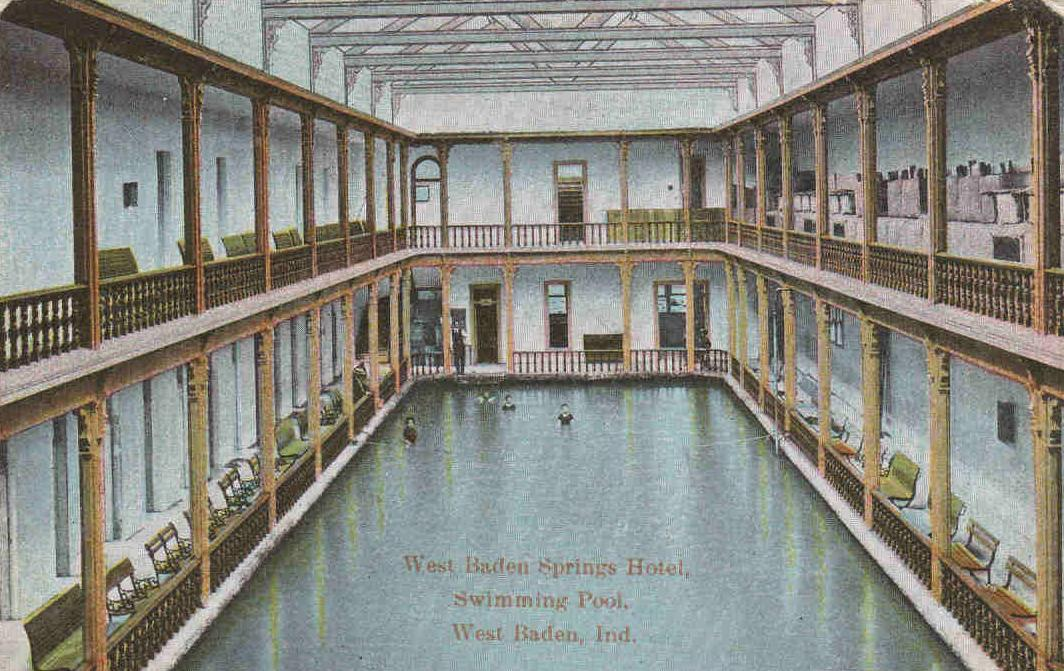
West Baden Springs Hotel natatorium

=== Notable guests ===
Over the years the West Baden hotel attracted many notable guests. Beginning in the late 1880s, when southern Indiana became a favorite destination of the wealthy, the famous, infamous, and near-famous came to relax, play golf, gamble, enjoy fine dining, and be entertained. As Chris Bundy, author of West Baden Springs: Legacy of Dreams, explained, "These hotels were the Disney World of their time. In those days, it was assumed that if you could afford to come to America [for vacation], you would go to French Lick. It was that well-known overseas."

Paul Dresser composed Indiana's state song "On the Banks of the Wabash, Far Away" at the hotel. Boxers John L. Sullivan and James J. Corbett trained there. Diamond Jim Brady and Al Capone and his bodyguards were frequent guests. Politicians who visited the hotel included Chicago's mayor, "Big Bill" Thompson, and New York's governor, Al Smith. General John J. Pershing, writer George Ade, and entertainer Eva Tanguay were also guests. Professional baseball teams that included the Chicago Cubs, Cincinnati Reds, Philadelphia Phillies, Pittsburgh Pirates, St. Louis Browns and St. Louis Cardinals held spring training in the region.

=== Renovation ===
Minor renovations to the property began in 1913, but a fire on February 11, 1917, destroyed the hotel's bottling plant, opera house, bowling alley and hospital, forcing their replacement. Several years prior to the fires, hotel owner Lee Sinclair's health began to fail and his daughter, Lillian, and her husband, Charles Rexford, took over the hotel's operation. When Sinclair died in 1916, management of the hotel was left in the hands of the Rexfords.

Charles Rexford opposed any major enhancements, but Lillian ignored his wishes and began a major restoration of the hotel in a Greco-Roman architectural style. Between 1917 and 1919, Italian artisans installed a mosaic terrazzo tile floor composed of two million one-inch squares of marble in the atrium. The atrium fireplace was refaced with glazed ceramic tiles from the Rookwood Pottery Company. Marble wainscotting was added to the atrium's ground level walls, while the brick support columns were wrapped with canvas and painted to resemble marble. Outside, an elaborate veranda was constructed. Wooden shelters at the springs were replaced with brick structures, and a sunken garden was created with a fountain featuring an angel.

Edward Ballard, who financed the hotel's improvements, began his career as a bowling alley worker in the hotel, but made a fortune by operating an illegal gambling business in the area. Ballard also owned several nationally recognized touring circuses, including the Hagenbeck-Wallace Circus. Between 1918 and 1919, while the hotel was being refurbished, it served as a U.S. Army hospital for wounded soldiers returning from World War I. Lillian Rexford and Lieutenant Charles Cooper fell in love during his stay at the hotel-hospital. The Rexfords divorced in 1922, and Lillian sold the property to Ballard for $1 million in 1923. Half the money repaid the debt owed to Ballard; Lillian kept the remainder.

Business at the hotel boomed in the 1920s; however, as ownership of automobiles increased and tourism destinations in Florida and the western United States became more popular, West Baden declined despite Ballard's efforts to attract more guests with trade shows and conventions. The Wall Street Crash of 1929 began a downward spiral for the hotel. As word of the plummeting stock market spread, people congregated in the brokerage firm's offices at the hotel to confirm the news. Within hours the guests began to depart. Ballard kept the facility open for more than two years, but few people stayed in luxury hotels during the Great Depression. Ballard finally closed the hotel in June 1932. In 1934 he donated the $7 million resort to the Society of Jesus (Jesuits).

== Schools ==
=== Jesuit seminary ===
Beginning in 1934 the Jesuits began renovating the property to convert it into an austere seminary named West Baden College, an affiliate of Loyola University Chicago, and most of the hotel's luxurious fixtures, furnishings, and decorations were removed. The lobby was converted into a chapel with the addition of French doors and stained-glass windows. The former hotel's four Moorish towers were removed from the exterior after they fell into disrepair. Truckloads of stone were dumped into the mineral spring pools, then capped with concrete and turned into shrines for the saints.

The seminary operated for thirty years, but was closed following the 1963–64 school year due to low enrollment and escalating maintenance costs. The Jesuits sold the property in 1966 and returned to the Chicago area. During their time at West Baden the Jesuits established a cemetery for the seminary's priests that received thirty-nine interments. When the Jesuits sold the facility, they retained ownership of the cemetery land, which the Catholic church in French Lick agreed to maintain.

=== Northwood Institute ===
On November 2, 1966, the Jesuits sold the property to Macauley and Helen Dow Whiting, who donated it to Northwood Institute, a private, coeducational college founded in Midland, Michigan. The former hotel/Jesuit seminary was operated as a satellite campus of Northwood's business management school from 1968 to 1983. By its third year at West Baden Springs, the school's enrollment exceeded 400 students. Basketball legend Larry Bird, who was born in West Baden, held basketball clinics and staged games in the atrium. He briefly attended Northwood, after leaving Indiana University, before resuming his studies and collegiate basketball career at Indiana State University.

After the school closed, H. Eugene MacDonald, a former Springs Valley resident, purchased the property in October 1983. MacDonald, who had owned other hotels, wanted to operate the property as a hotel, but lacked the financial resources for the restoration work. He executed a sale-and-leaseback deal with Marlin Properties, a Los Angeles historical renovation developer, for $1.5 million, but a $250,000 payment from Marlin was returned for nonsufficient funds in 1985. Before MacDonald could begin foreclosure proceedings, Marlin declared bankruptcy and the hotel's ownership was tied up in litigation for nearly a decade.

== Preservation ==
The Jesuits and Northwood's owners maintained the building's structure, leaving it in reasonably good shape when MacDonald purchased it in 1983. The property was declared a National Historic Landmark in 1987, but Marlin failed to preserve the building while it was in bankruptcy. Visitors continued to tour the structure until 1989, when it was declared unsafe, and closed. During the winter of 1991, ice built up on the roof and in drainpipes, leading to the partial collapse of an exterior wall.

In 1992 the National Trust for Historic Preservation listed the hotel as one of America's most endangered places and the Historic Landmarks Foundation of Indiana matched an anonymous $70,000 donation to pay for work to stabilize the main structure. Tie rods were installed, the roof was patched, drainage was improved on roof parapets, and the structure around the partially collapsed wall was secured. HLFI also created promotional materials to help find a buyer and promoted the establishment of a local zoning and redevelopment commission.

Minnesota Investment Partners purchased the property in May 1994 for $500,000 from the bankruptcy receiver. Grand Casinos, Inc., an MIP investor, provided the funding and held an option on the hotel, but was unsuccessful in its efforts to pass "Boat on a Moat" legislation in 1995 to extend riverboat gambling to a proposed man-made lake adjacent to the hotel. When Grand Casinos walked away from their option, MIP tried to sell the property for $800,000, but a year passed with no interest. In July 1996 MIP accepted a purchase offer of $250,000 from HLFI West Baden, Inc., a new affiliate of HLFI, using funds provided by an anonymous donor.

Bill Cook, a billionaire entrepreneur, and his wife, Gayle, from Bloomington, Indiana, have been involved with several historic preservation projects. The Cook Group initiated efforts to stabilize the hotel's structural integrity and begin exterior restoration during the summer of 1996. The thirty-month first phase of the project was completed in early 1999 at a cost of $30 million—two-and-a-half times their initial commitment. In addition to the exteriors of the hotel and outbuildings, the garden was recreated, and the interior atrium, lobby, dining room and adjoining rooms were also completely restored. Over the next five years, the Cook Group spent another $5 million for maintenance. The reconstruction project was featured in West Baden Springs: Save of the Century (1999), a documentary produced by Eugene Brancolini for WTIU Public Television. It chronicled the rise, demise, and restoration of the hotel. Using historical documents, photos, and archival footage, Brancolini's documentary explained how the property regained and even surpassed its former luxury.

== Casino resort ==
HLFI West Baden unsuccessfully marketed the property nationally for more than five years before realizing that casino gaming would be the key to their success. HLFI joined the Cook Group, Boykin Lodging (owner of the French Lick Springs Hotel), and Orange County citizens to lobby the Indiana legislature to allow casino gambling in the area. The coalition members spent so much time in Indianapolis lobbying for their cause that they became known as "The Orange Shirts", in reference to the color of their T-shirts bearing the slogan, "Save French Lick and West Baden Springs".

Legislation was finally approved in 2003 and the required local referendum easily passed. The Trump Organization was initially granted the gambling license by the Indiana Gaming Commission, but Trump's subsequent bankruptcy caused the selection process to begin again. The Cook family decided to form a new company, Blue Sky, LLC, and submitted its application, before purchasing the French Lick Springs Hotel from Boykin Lodging. Blue Sky was awarded the gambling license during the summer of 2005 and stepped up the planning and permitting process for the casino. Construction of the French Lick Resort Casino and renovation of the French Lick Springs Hotel occurred simultaneously in the fall of 2005.

== Restoration ==
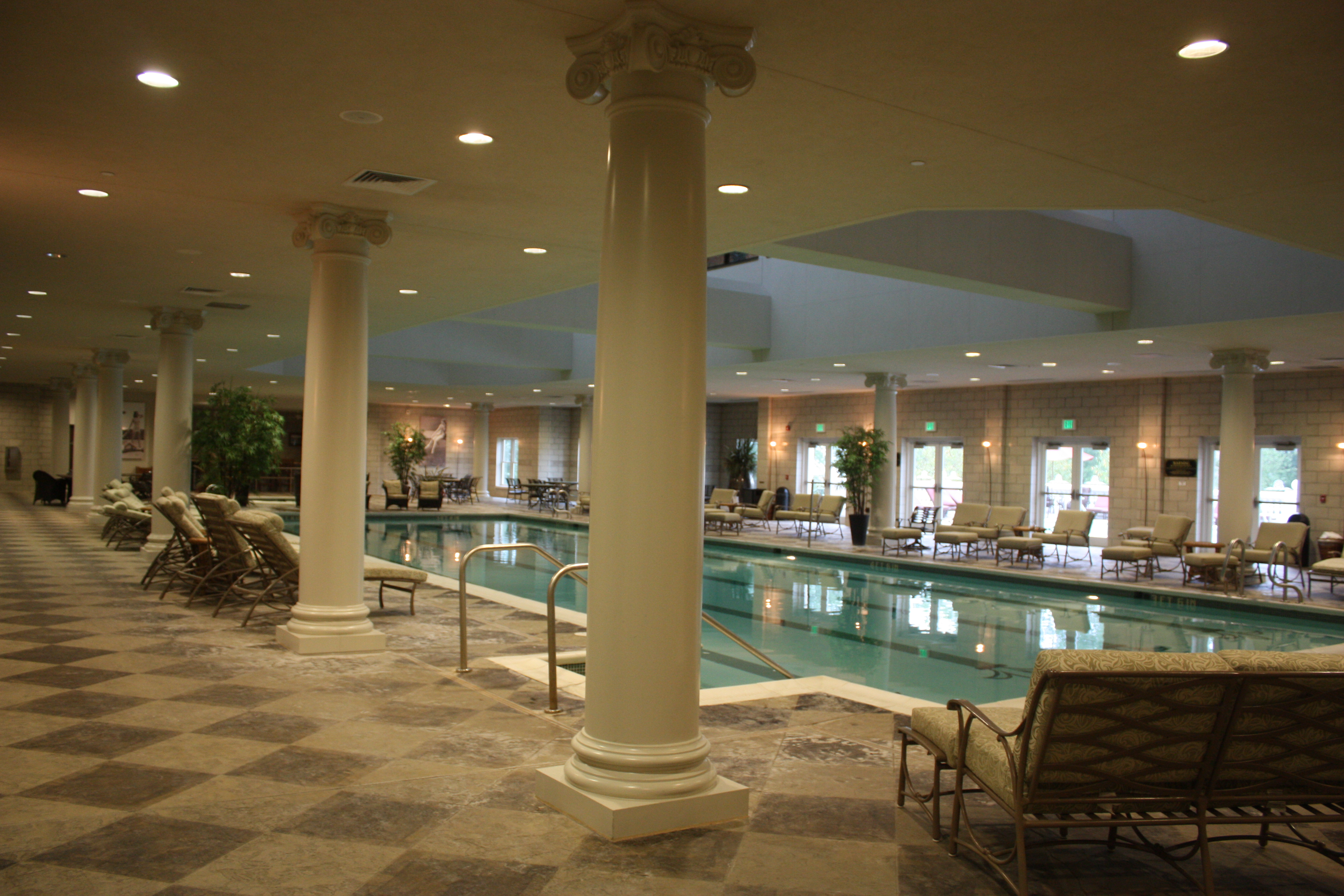
West Baden Springs Hotel Natatorium

In the spring of 2006, HLFI West Baden deeded the West Baden Springs Hotel to the Cook Group for a token amount in appreciation for the $35 million already invested. Restoration of the hotel resumed in the summer of 2006. The French Lick Springs Hotel and French Lick Resort Casino opened together on November 3, 2006. A gala event on June 23, 2007, marked the reopening of the West Baden Springs Hotel, seventy-five years after it closed.

The West Baden hotel's reconfigured space contained 243 rooms and suites, fewer than half of the total in the original structure. The hotel's natatorium was rebuilt using historic photographs as a guide. The total cost of the complete restoration of the West Baden Springs Hotel totaled almost $100 million. Indiana Landmarks holds a perpetual preservation easement on the West Baden Springs Hotel that requires prior approval to make any changes to the hotel's exterior or grounds, even if ownership changes.

== Recognition ==
West Baden Springs Hotel logo

The West Baden Springs Hotel was listed on the National Register of Historic Places in 1974 and named a National Historic Landmark in 1987. In 2008 Condé Nast magazine ranked the hotel twenty-first on its list of the "Top 75 Mainland U.S. Resorts." In 2009 the American Automobile Association recognized the hotel as one of the top ten historic hotels in the United States. and awarded it a four- diamond rating. A Zagat Survey in 2009 included the hotel on its list of "Top U.S. Hotels, Resorts & Spas."

The National Trust for Historic Preservation has included the hotel in its Historic Hotels of America program. The American Society of Civil Engineers designated the hotel as a National Historic Civil Engineering Landmark.

== In popular culture ==
In the 1900s and 1910s the African-American employees of the West Baden Springs Hotel played on an early Negro league baseball team called the West Baden Sprudels. They played their rivals, the French Lick Plutos of the nearby French Lick Springs Hotel.

The hotel is the setting for Michael Koryta's thriller, So Cold the River (2010), as well as its 2021 movie adaptation.

== Gallery ==
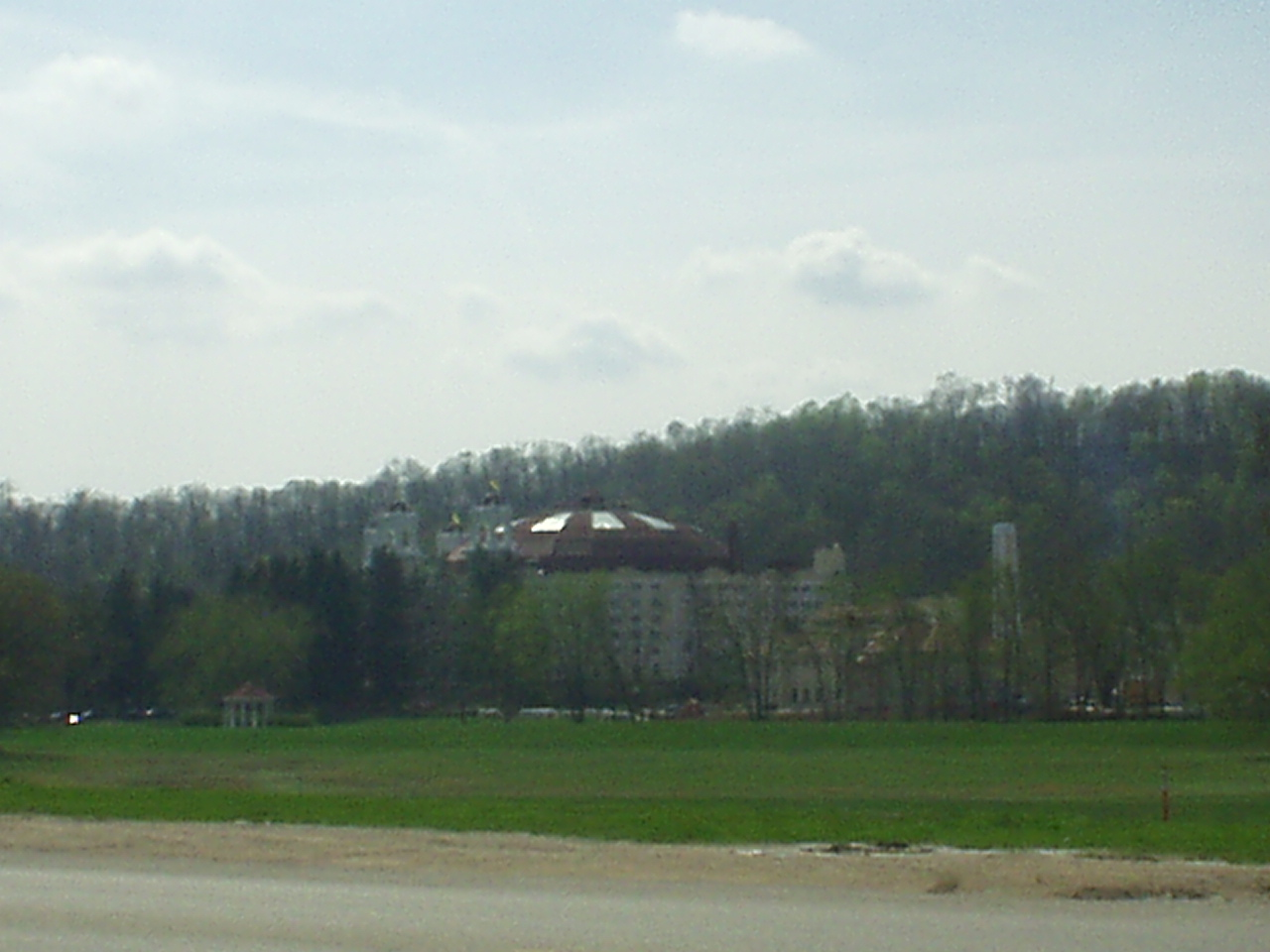

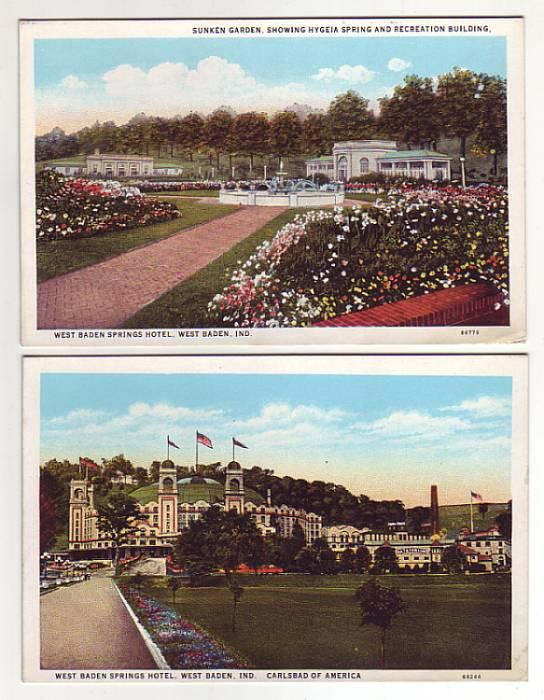

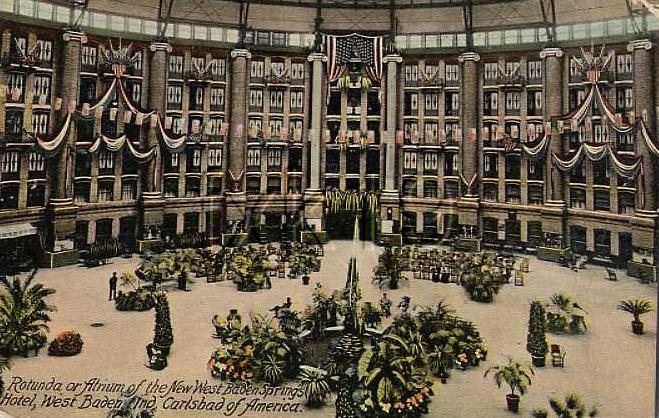

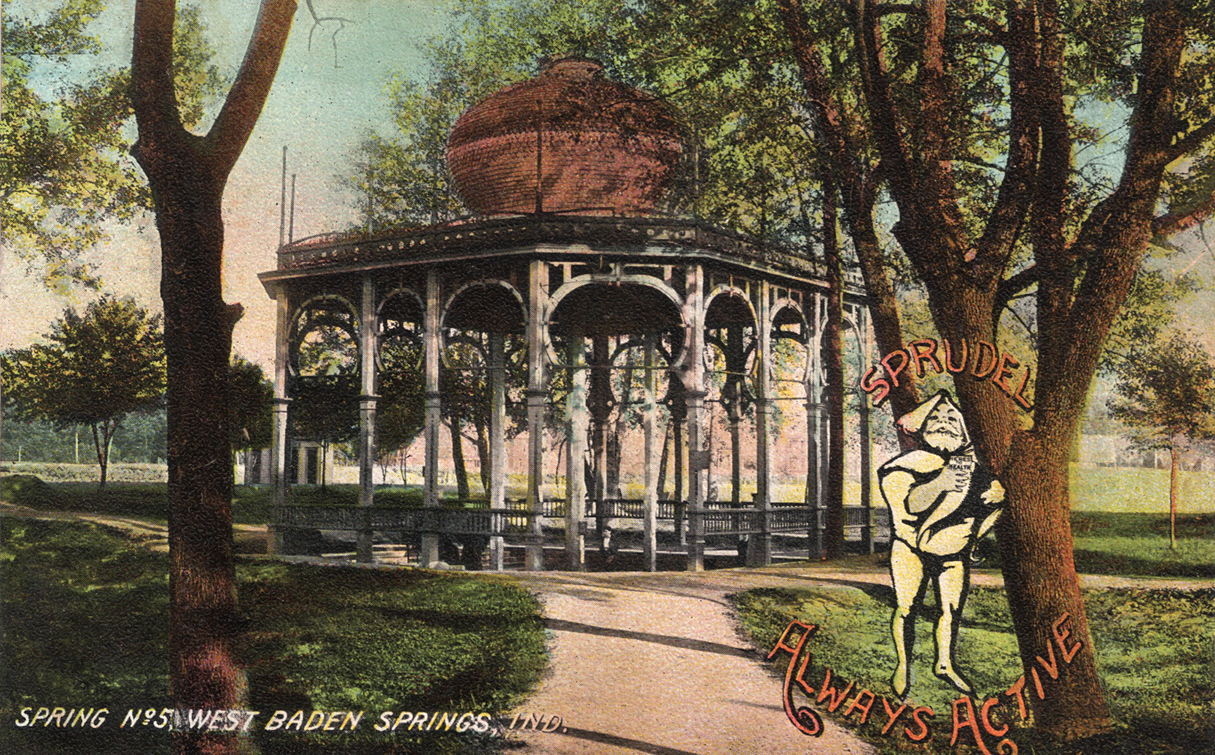

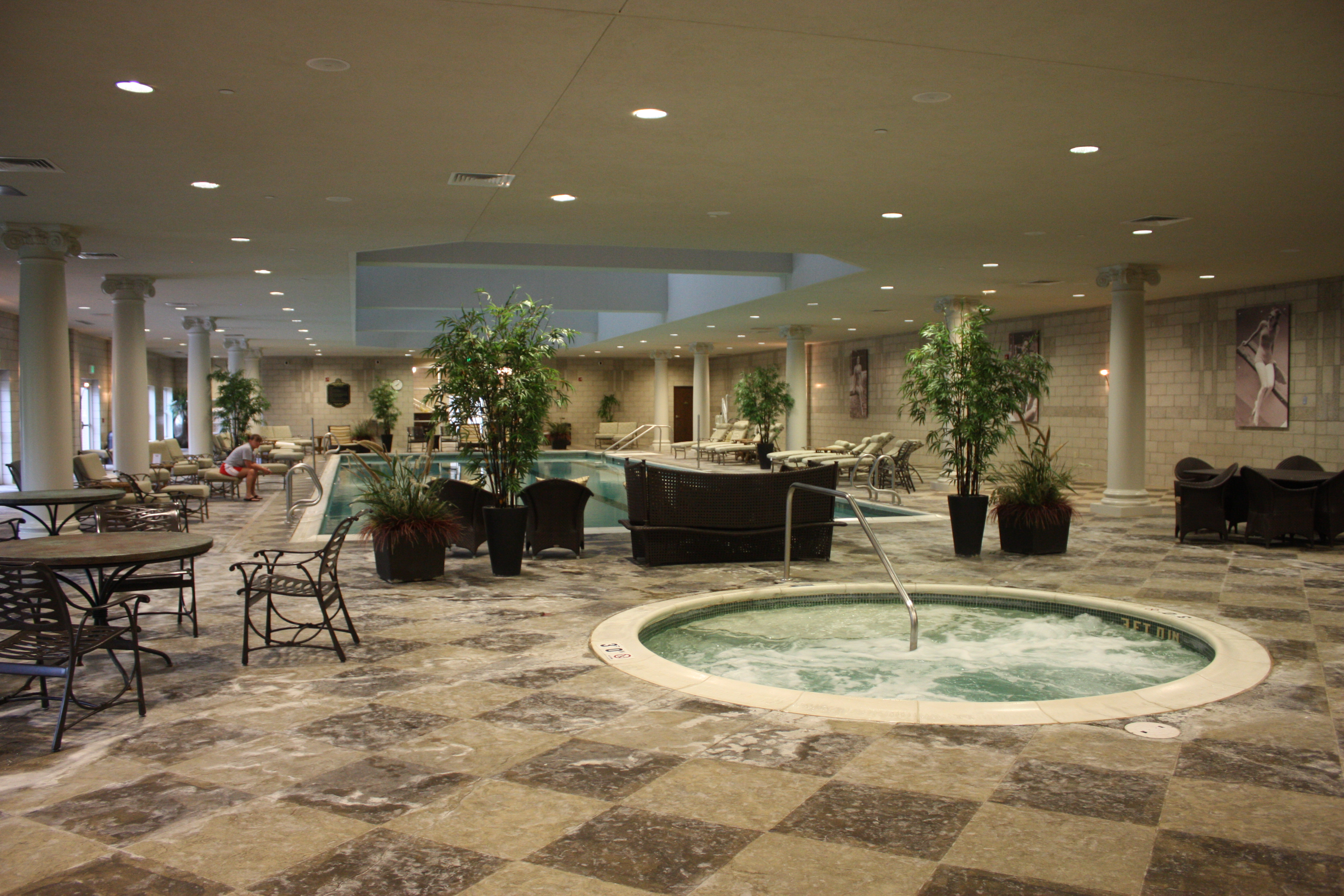

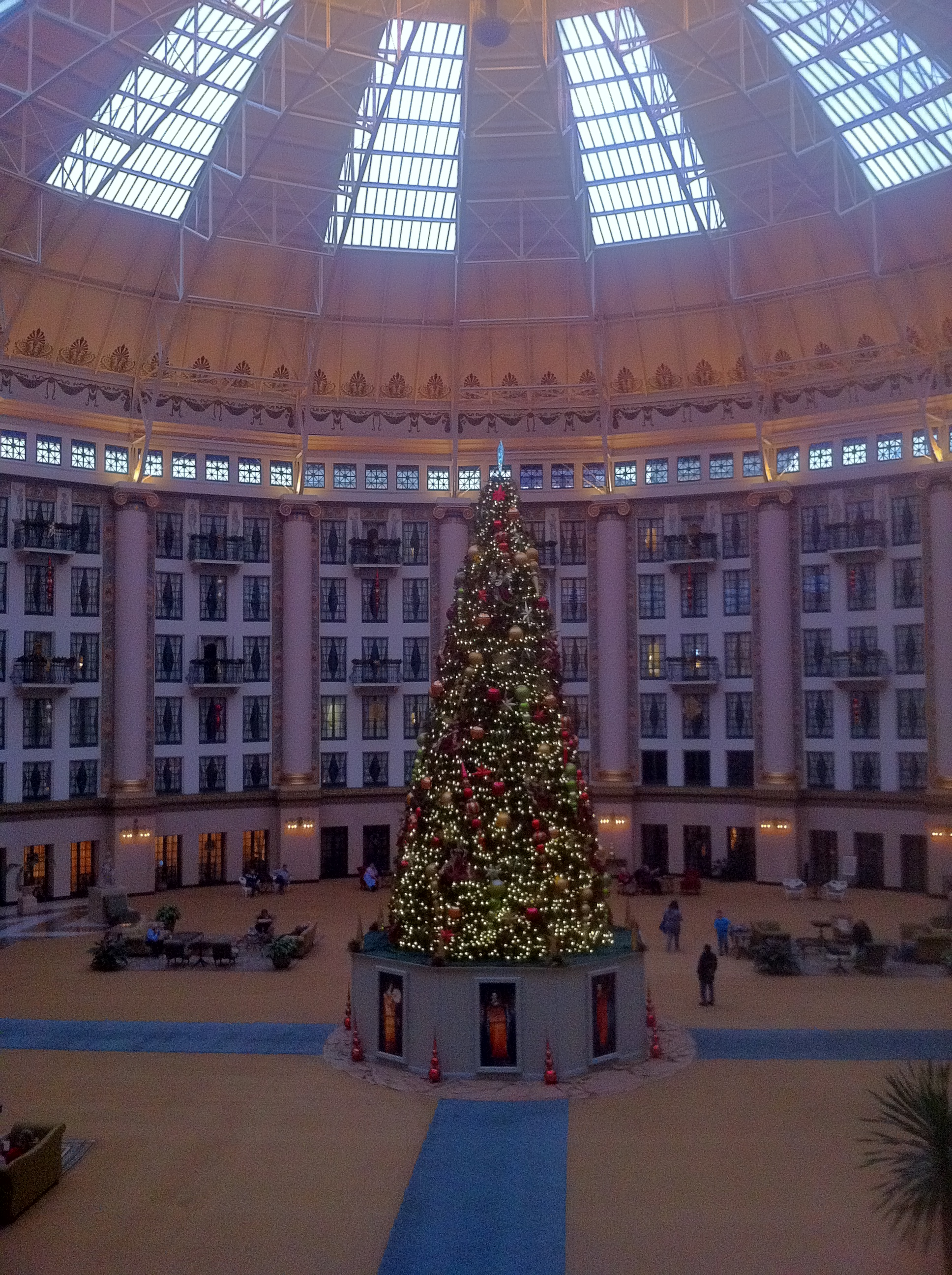

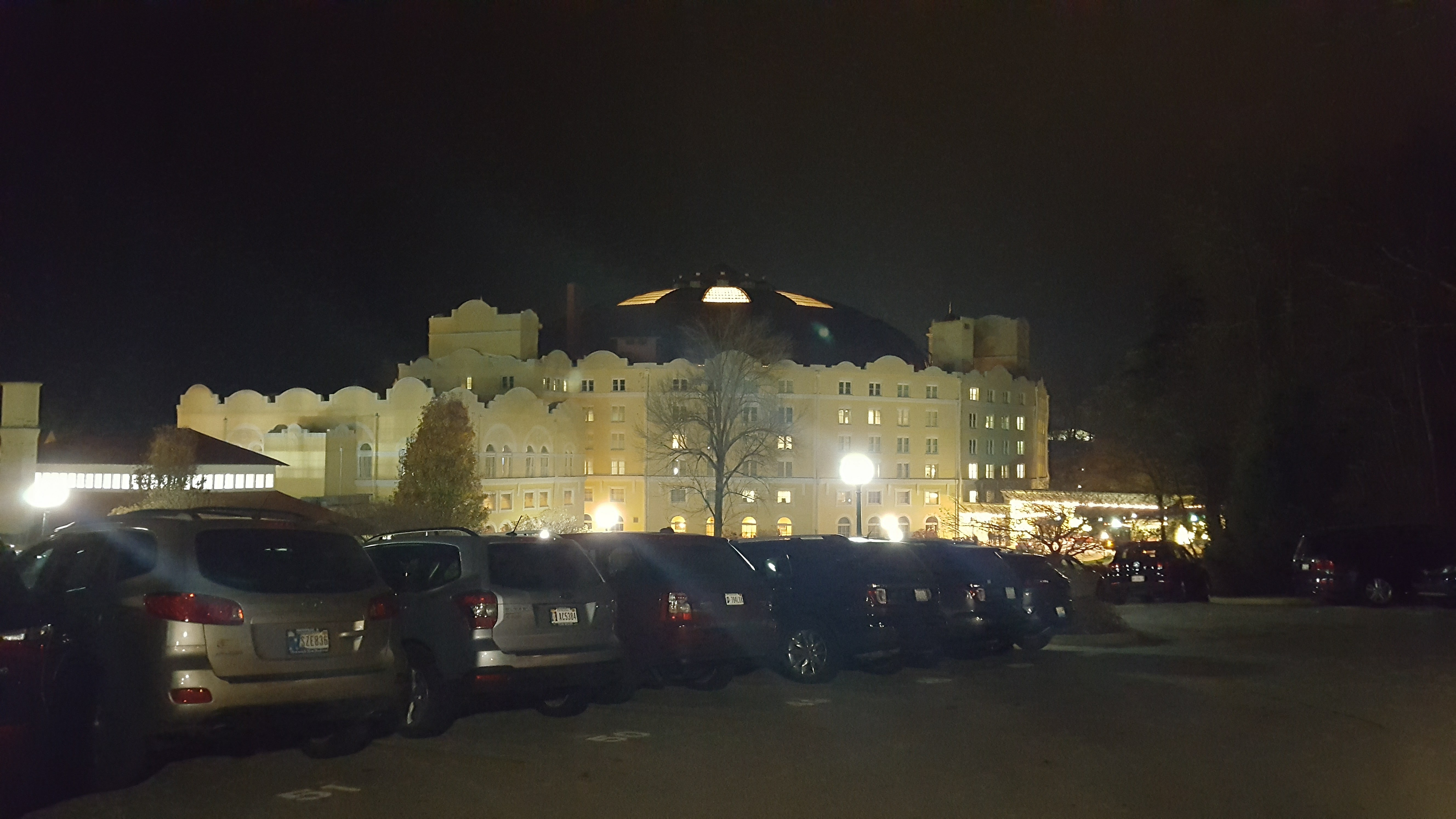
Exterior at night, 2016

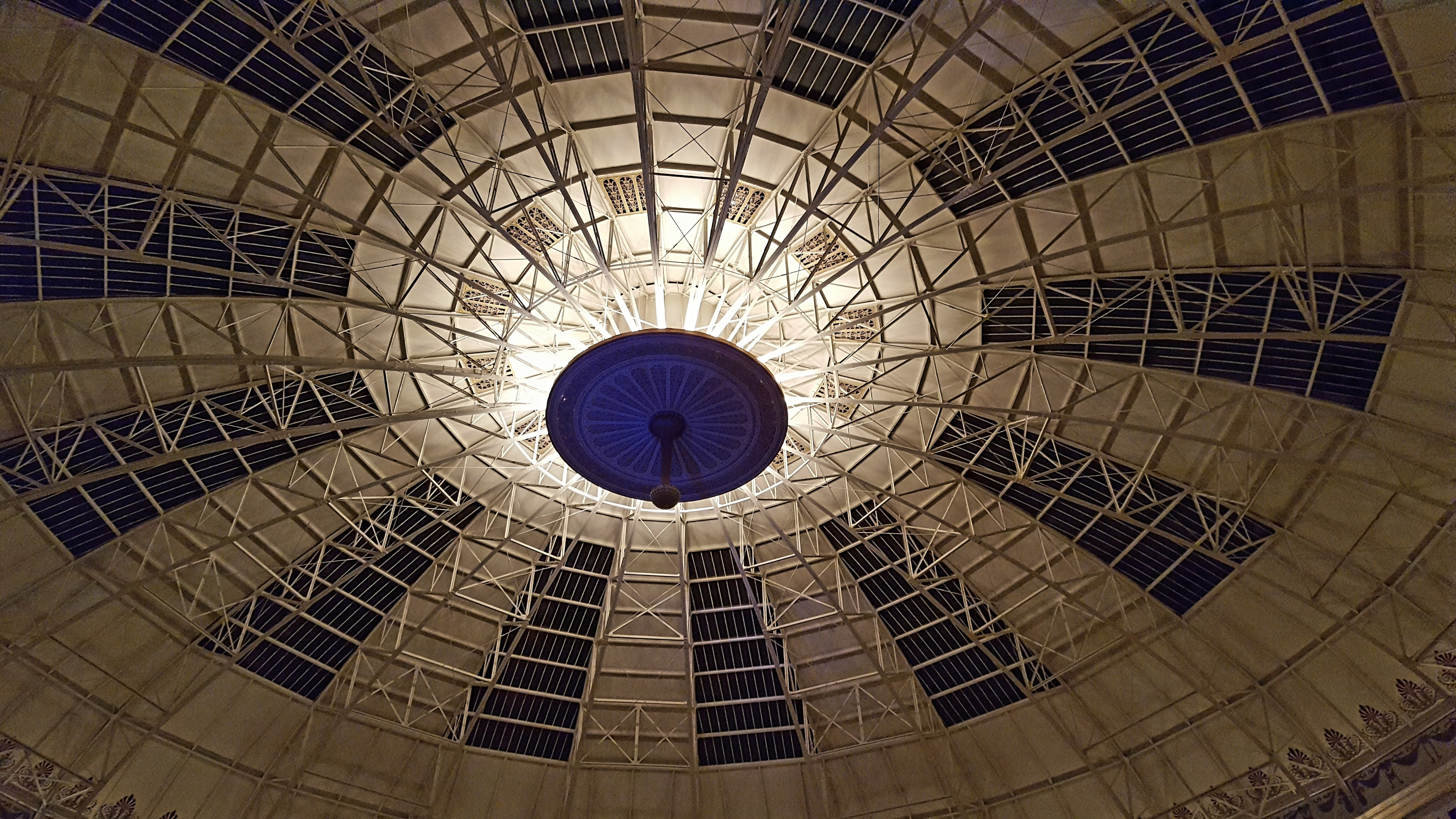
Interior dome detail, 2016

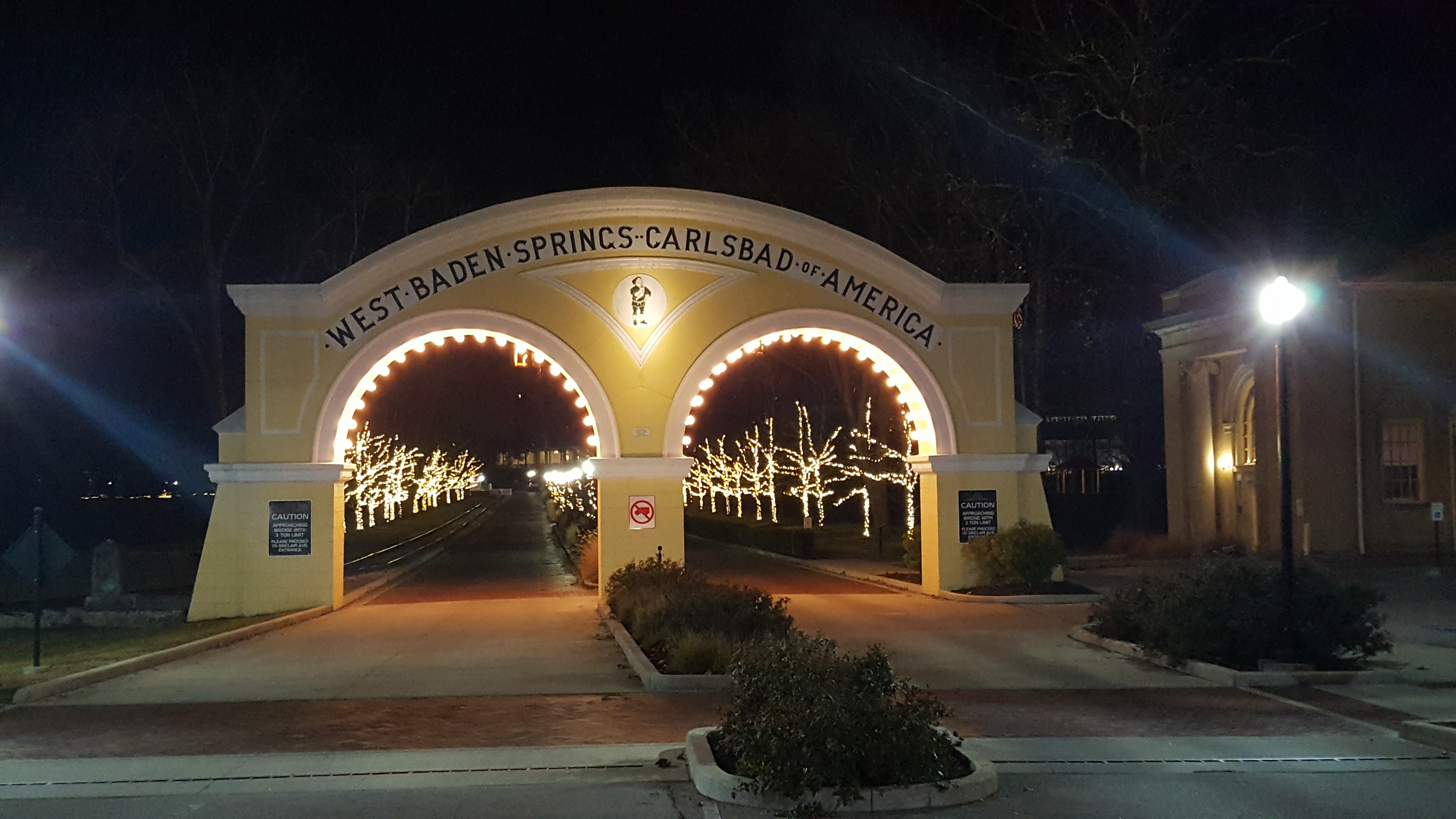
Entrance gate, 2016

== See also ==
- National Register of Historic Places listings in Orange County, Indiana
- List of National Historic Landmarks in Indiana
- List of largest domes
- List of tallest domes
