= Dixie Garage =

Historic building in Indiana, United States

- U.S. National Register of Historic Places
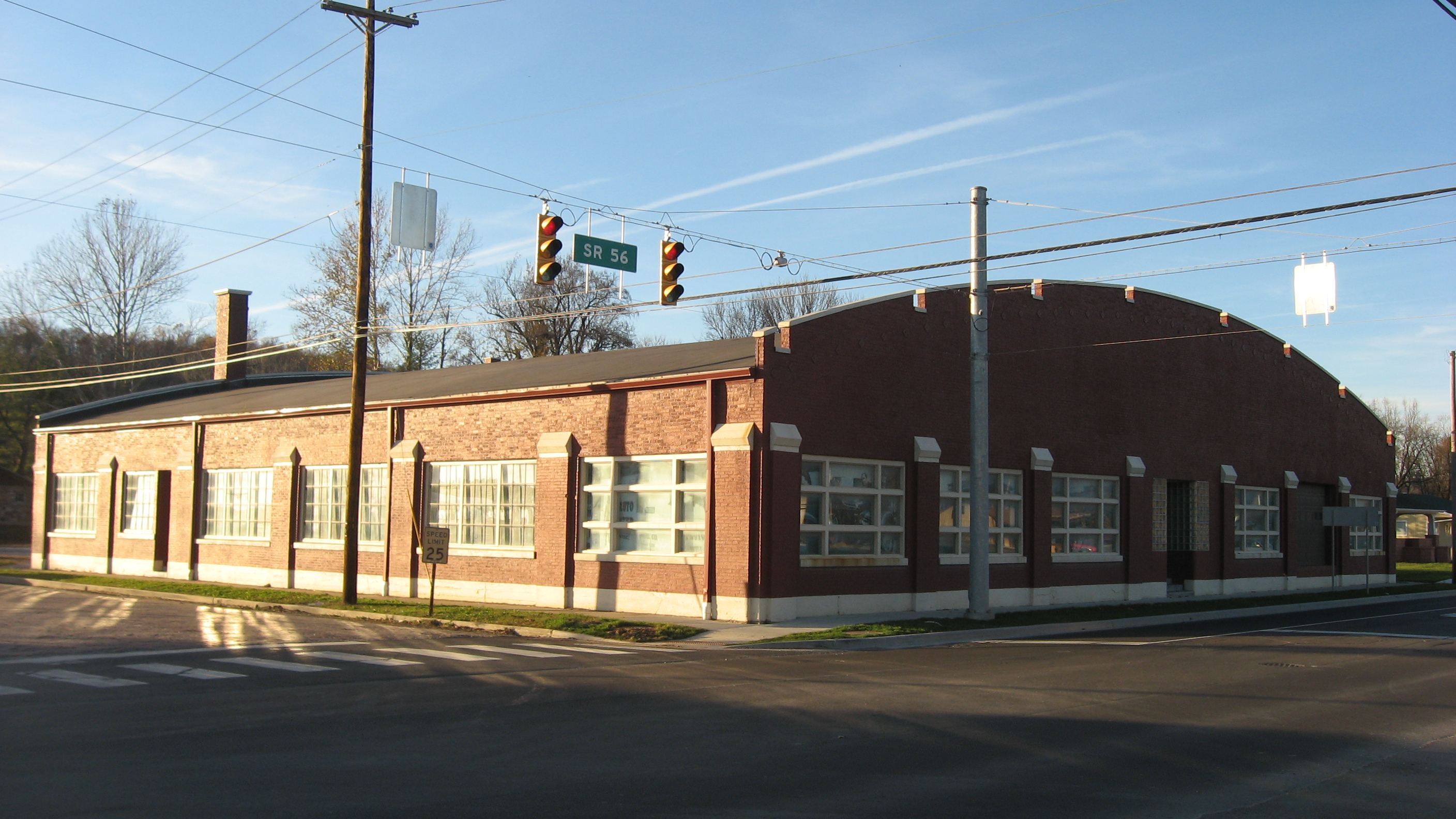
- Dixie Garage, November 2011

- Location within Indiana Location within the United States
- Location: IN 56 and Sinclair Ave., West Baden Springs, Indiana
- Coordinates: 38°33′49″N 86°36′52″W
- Area: less than one acre
- Built: 1918-1920
- Architectural style: Early Commercial
- NRHP reference No.: 01000983
- Added to NRHP: September 16, 2001

Dixie Garage, also known as the Nash Garage, is a historic automobile repair shop located at West Baden Springs, Indiana. It was built between 1918 and 1920, and is a large one-story, brick building with a barrel vaulted roof. It is square in plan and features curved parapets and corner piers. Inside the building is a two-story, concrete block structure. The building housed an automobile repair shop until the late 1930s, after which it housed a skating rink, bottling plant, and wood manufacturer.

It was listed on the National Register of Historic Places in 2001.
