= Oxford Hotel (West Baden Springs, Indiana) =

- U.S. National Register of Historic Places
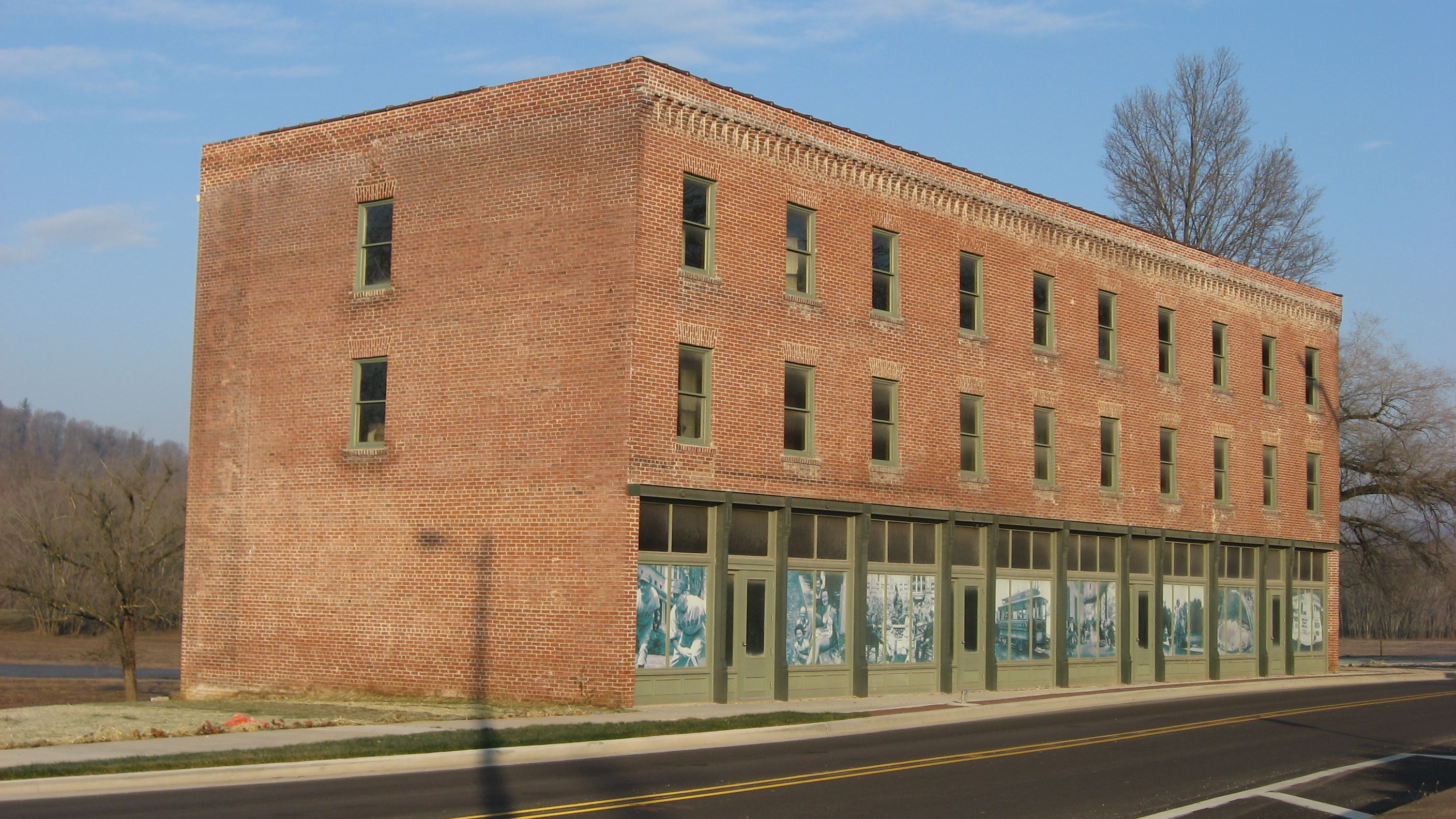
- Oxford Hotel, December 2011

- Location within Indiana Location within the United States
- Location: In 56, West Baden Springs, Indiana
- Coordinates: 38°34′4″N 86°36′52″W
- Area: less than one acre
- Built: c. 1910
- Architectural style: Early Commercial
- NRHP reference No.: 01000977
- Added to NRHP: September 16, 2001

The Oxford Hotel, also known as the West Baden Springs Hotel, is a historic hotel building located at West Baden Springs, Indiana. It was built about 1910, and is a large three-story, rectangular, brick building. It features cast iron storefronts and a pitched roof with straight and stepped parapets.

It was listed on the National Register of Historic Places in 2001.
