= French Lick Springs Hotel =

Resort hotel in Orange County, Indiana

- U.S. National Register of Historic Places
- U.S. Historic district
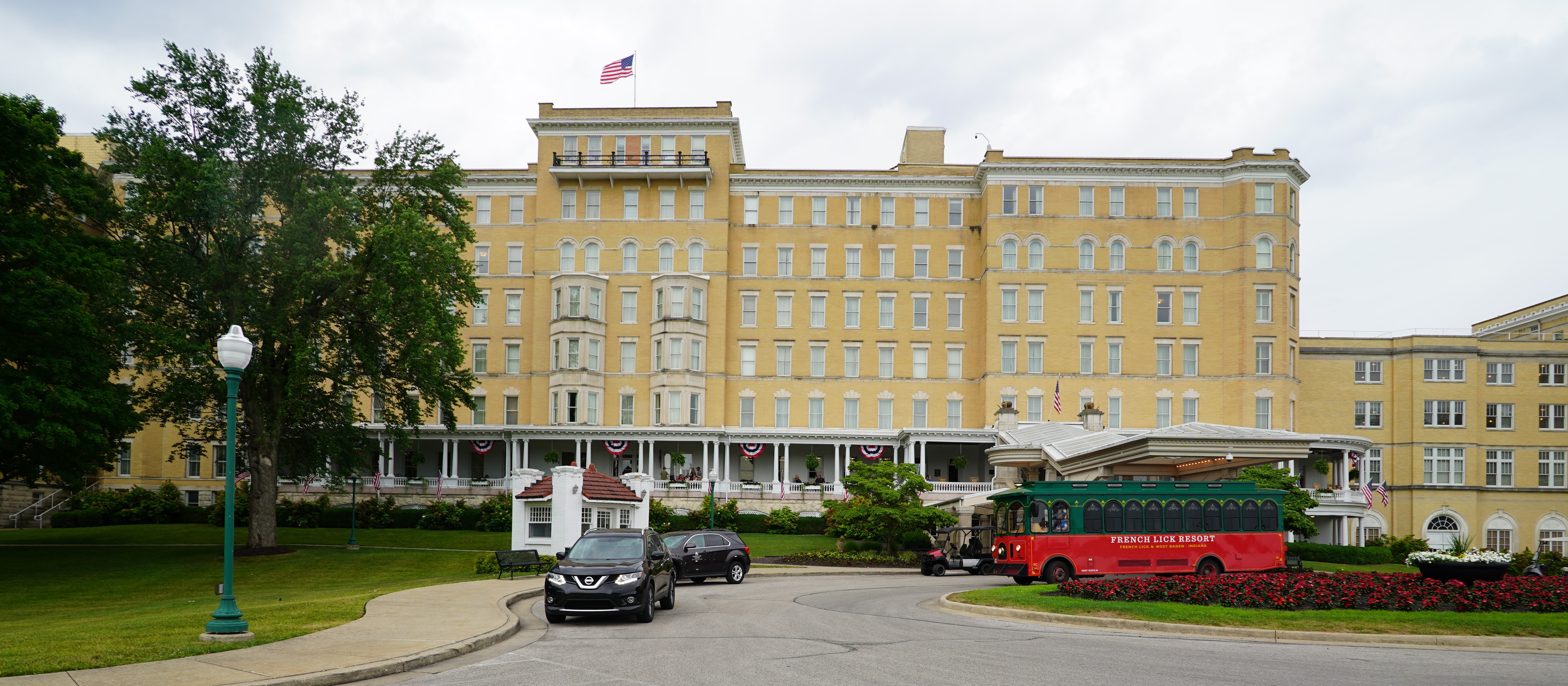
- French Lick Springs Hotel

- Location within Indiana Location within the United States
- Location: 8670 West IN 56, French Lick, Indiana
- Coordinates: 38°33′15″N 86°37′15″W
- Built: 1901
- Architect: Bendelow, Thomas; Floyd, William Homer, et al; D.A. Bohlen & Son
- Architectural style: Queen Anne, Renaissance, et al.
- NRHP reference No.: 03000972
- Added to NRHP: September 28, 2003

The French Lick Springs Hotel is a major resort hotel that is a part of the French Lick Resort complex in Orange County, Indiana. The historic hotel in the national historic district at French Lick was initially known as a mineral spring health spa and for its trademarked Pluto Water. During the period 1901 to 1946, when Thomas Taggart, a former mayor of Indianapolis, and his son, Thomas D. Taggart, were its owners and operators, the popular hotel attracted many fashionable, wealthy, and notable guests. The resort was a major employer of African-American labor, which mostly came from Kentucky.

In the early 1900s, the hotel had a Negro league baseball team, the French Lick Plutos, and until the 1940s French Lick was a venue for spring training for professional baseball teams. In the 1920s and into the 1930s, the resort became known for its recreational sports, most notably golf, but the French Lick area also had a reputation for illegal gambling. After a series of subsequent owners and renovations, the hotel was listed on the National Register of Historic Places in 2003. The restored hotel, with its exteriors of distinctive, buff-colored brick, reopened in 2006.

== History ==
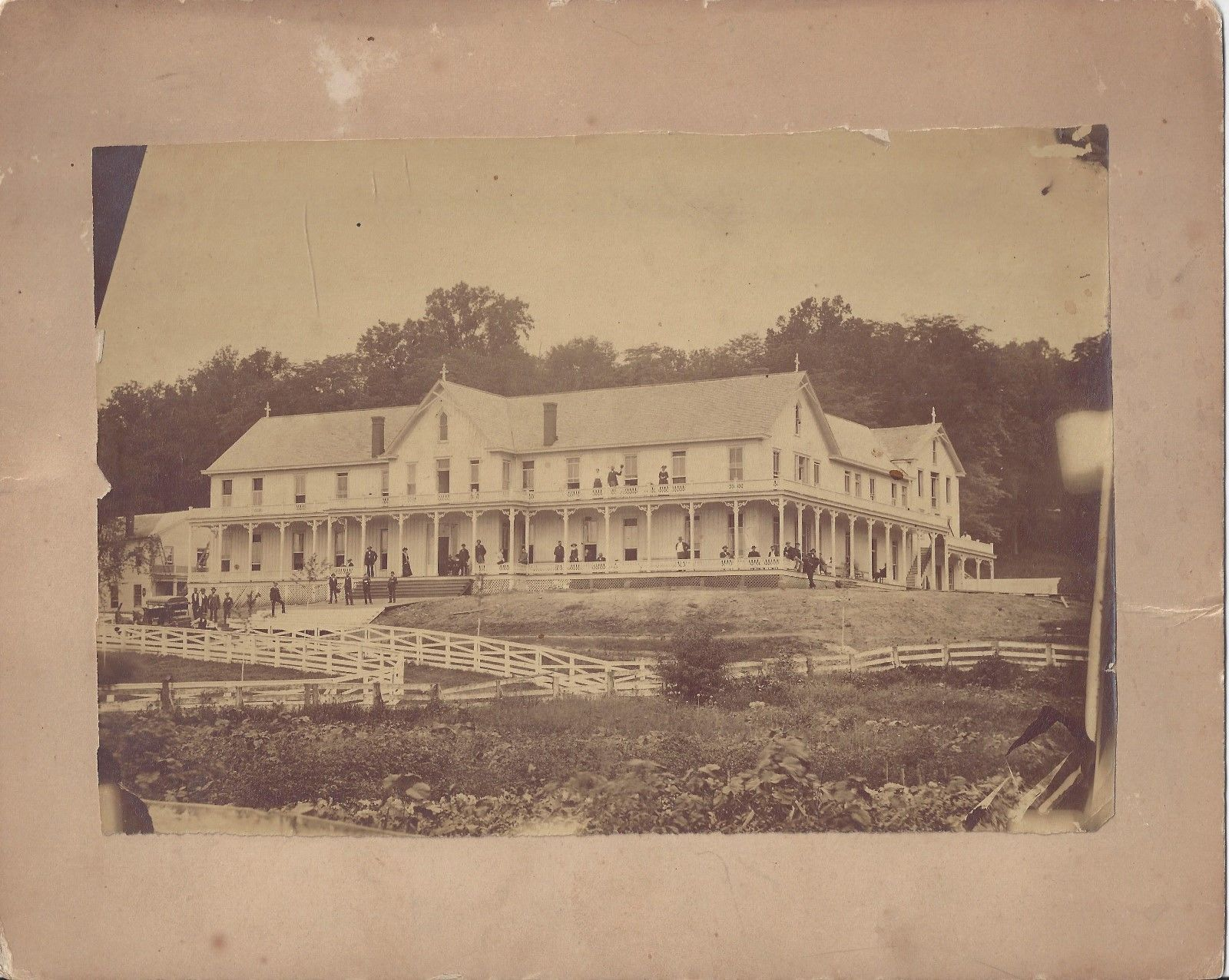
Hotel in the 1880s

=== Origins ===
The hotel site was located near a salt lick that wild animals once visited as they traveled along the Buffalo Trace in southern Indiana. Native Americans also used the area as hunting grounds. It became known as French Lick in reference to the French traders and settlers who lived in the vicinity of the salt lick. Some sources have cited a legend that suggests George Rogers Clark, who camped in the area during an expedition in 1786–87, may have named it after a site along the Cumberland River in Tennessee.

=== Early development ===
In 1826, encouraged by the presence of salt deposits near French Lick, Indiana's state government authorized the land to be mined for quantities of salt, but the saline content was insufficient to support large-scale salt mining and the property was offered for sale. In 1832 Thomas Bowles and his brother, William A., a Paoli, Indiana, physician and early land speculator, purchased 1,500 acres (610 hectares) of land that included the site near the mineral springs. Doctor Bowles eventually built an inn on the property; it became known as the French Lick Springs Hotel.

Although the specific date of the hotel's opening is not known, it is believed that Bowles built the first hotel on his French Lick property sometime around 1845. (Some sources believe the narrow, three-story hotel, measuring an estimated 80 feet (24 m) to 100 feet (30 m) in length, may have been built prior to 1840, but most report that it opened in 1845.) The early hotel, which operated during the summer months, was a modest success. In 1846, prior to his departure for military service as a commissioned officer in the U.S. Army during the Mexican–American War, Bowles leased the property to John A. Lane, a physician/patent medicine salesman, for at least five years. Under the terms of the lease Lane agreed to enlarge and improve the facility.

In the early 1850s Bowles resumed management of the hotel and continued to improve the property. Lane purchased 770 acres (310 hectares) of land from Bowles that included mineral springs at Mile Lick, 1 mile (1.6 km) north of French Lick. Lane assembled a sawmill, erected a bridge to traverse Lick Creek, and built the West Baden Springs Hotel. Competition from Lane's new hotel, which opened in the mid-1850s, began a decades-long rivalry between the two Orange County sites. In the 1860s Bowles leased the French Lick hotel to Doctor Samuel Ryan, who operated it for Bowles and the heirs of Bowles's estate following the owner's death in 1873. Joseph G. Rogers, a physician from Madison, Indiana, named the French Lick hotel's largest mineral spring Pluto's Well in 1869. (Pluto is the classical mythological god of the underworld.)

The original French Lick hotel, which was rebuilt or enlarged as a 2 1/2-story frame building with a wrap-around veranda in the Gothic Revival style, underwent few additional changes until the early 1880s, when it was sold to Hiram E. Wells and James M. Andrews. The hotel and mineral springs were sold at a sheriff's sale organized to settle a legal dispute over Bowles's estate. Wells and Andrews enlarged and improved the property in the 1880s and 1890s, developing it into a popular health resort.

Wells acquired Andrews's interest in the property in 1887 for $61,000, and immediately sold the hotel to a group of Louisville, Kentucky, investors for $122,000 in cash and $100,000 in the French Lick Springs Company's stock. Wells retained a one-quarter interest in the property until 1891, when he sold his interest to the investment group. The new owners added two wings to the main hotel and expanded the hotel's operation from a seasonal business to a year-round resort. In 1887 the Monon Railroad built an extension of its line to transport guests to the hotels and mineral springs at French Lick and West Baden.

The main hotel building (Windsor) was destroyed by fire in 1897. It was rebuilt on an even grander scale. Three major springs were located on the French Lick resort's property: Bowles (renamed Lithia), Proserpine, and the better-known Pluto. The area's mineral water and baths were alleged to cure more than fifty ailments, including gout, alcoholism, and rheumatism, among others.

=== Taggart era ===
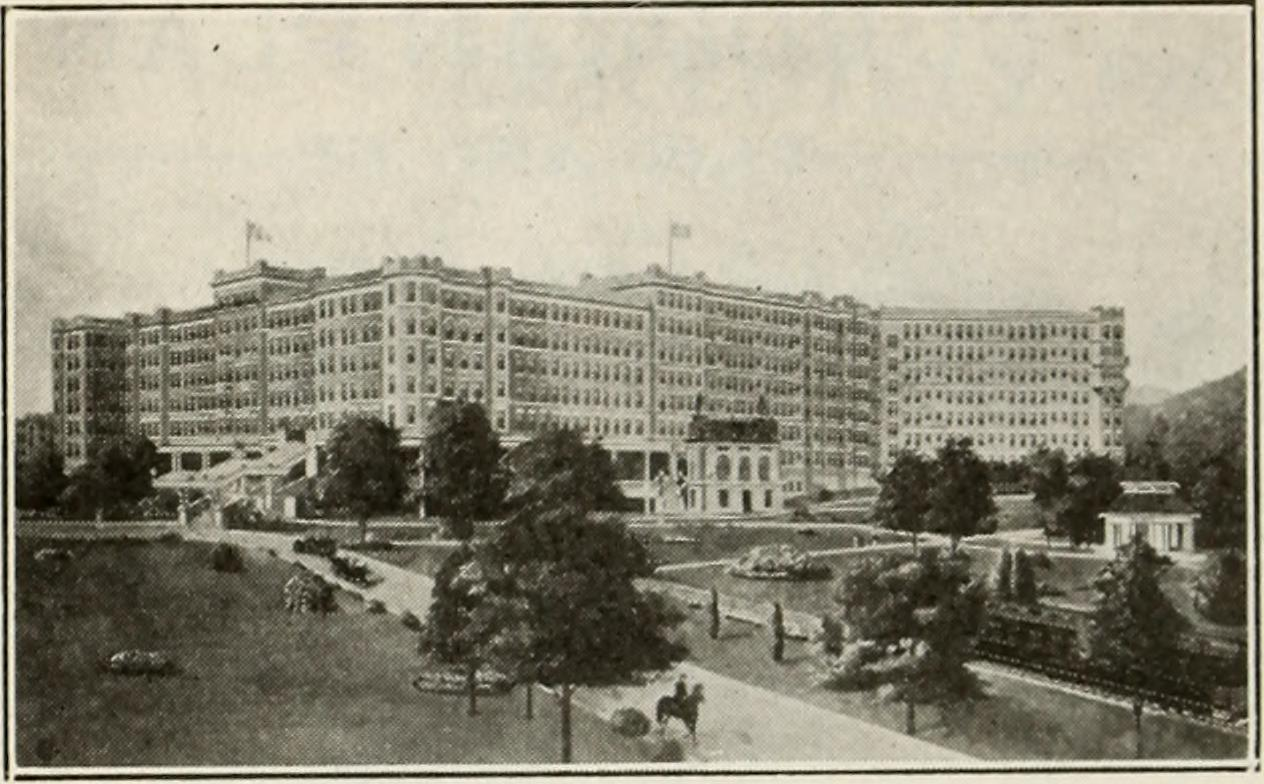
Turn of the century

In 1901 the property was sold to an investment group that included Thomas Taggart, a politician and former mayor of Indianapolis. Taggart served three terms as mayor of Indianapolis (1895 to 1901), as a chairman of the Democratic National Committee, and briefly in the U.S. Senate (1916). Other members of the investment group included William McDoel, president of the Monon Railroad; Crawford Fairbanks, a Terre Haute brewery owner; and Livingston T. Dickson, a limestone quarry owner. The new owners spent more than $200,000 on improvements, including a redesign and enlargement of the main wing (1901–02), sometimes called the front or east wing, designed by architect William Homer Floyd. The main wing's new design overlaid the hotel's Late Victorian architecture with Mediterranean Revival architecture, most notably the Italian Renaissance style that was popular in the late nineteenth and early twentieth century. The exteriors of the main wing and later additions were unified with similar proportions, a consistent roofline, and the hotel's distinctive buff-colored brick.

Around 1905 Taggart bought out his partners to become the hotel's sole owner. Under his direction, the hotel was transformed into a first-class resort that included the main wing (1901–1902), a recreation center (formerly the bath house, 1910–11), and four connected wings: annex (1905, remodeled 1911), west (1910–11), deluxe (1914–15), and north (1924–25). These facilities housed lobbies and guest room, dining rooms and bars, offices, shops, and a spa. The annex wing provided offices and guest rooms. The west wing, the hotel's first fireproof wing, included an elaborate Italian Renaissance Revival-style pavilion, originally named the Pluto Bar. The seven-story deluxe wing housed guest rooms and suites, including accommodations for the Taggart family when they resided at the hotel. The hotel's six-story north wing provided the hotel with conference and exhibition spaces.

Taggart made additional improvements at the mineral springs that included the construction of pavilions, including the Pluto spring house (circa 1911), to shelter the springs. A new mineral spring bath was built at the site of the present-day spa facility. In addition, Taggart is credited with modernizing the hotel, which included bringing in electricity, adding a fresh water system, and establishing trolley service to French Lick. The hotel's service buildings included a kitchen complex (1897, 1910–11, c. 1925), power station (1902, expanded 1905), its first bottling plant (circa 1900) for Pluto Water, and a hotel laundry (circa 1911–13). He also convinced the Monon Railroad to lay a spur track to the hotel's grounds and run daily passenger service to Chicago. The hotel also had three distinct gardens on its grounds: a Japanese garden (circa 1920; later redesigned and replanted), a Fresh Water Spring garden (circa 1900–15), and an Italian-style formal garden (circa 1915; later redesigned and altered). Recreational facilities included horseback riding, tennis, swimming, bowling, billiards, and a gym, as well as fine dining and dancing to music from the hotel's orchestra.

At the height of the resort's popularity, which occurred during Taggart's ownership of the hotel, approximately 150 to 200 guests checked into the hotel each day. The resort provided Taggart with more than $2 million in annual profits. Following Taggart's death in 1929, Thomas Douglas Taggart, the politician's son, became owner of the hotel property, which included approximately 4,000 acres (1,600 hectares) and buildings valued at nearly $2 million.

=== Decline ===
In the years following the Wall Street stock market crash of 1929, the resort went into decline, but it did not close. To survive the financial challenges of the Great Depression and an increase in competition from other American resorts, the French Lick hotel was promoted as a recreational resort with an emphasis on golf and convention business, rather than health. Thomas D. Taggart sold the hotel to a group of New York City investors in 1946 Pluto Water operations were separated from the resort's operations in 1948. The resort was sold to Sheraton Hotels in 1954 and renamed the French Lick-Sheraton Hotel. Although the Sheraton chain spent "millions of dollars" to improve the facilities, the physical plant continued to decline. Sheraton sold the hotel to Cox Hotel Corporation of New York in 1979. Cox returned the resort to its original name and sold the property to Kenwood Financial in 1986. The Luther James family of Louisville, Kentucky, acquired the hotel in 1991, and Boykin Lodging of Cleveland, Ohio, bought it in 1997. The Cook Group, headquartered in Bloomington, Indiana, purchased the hotel on April 13, 2005.

== Casino resort ==
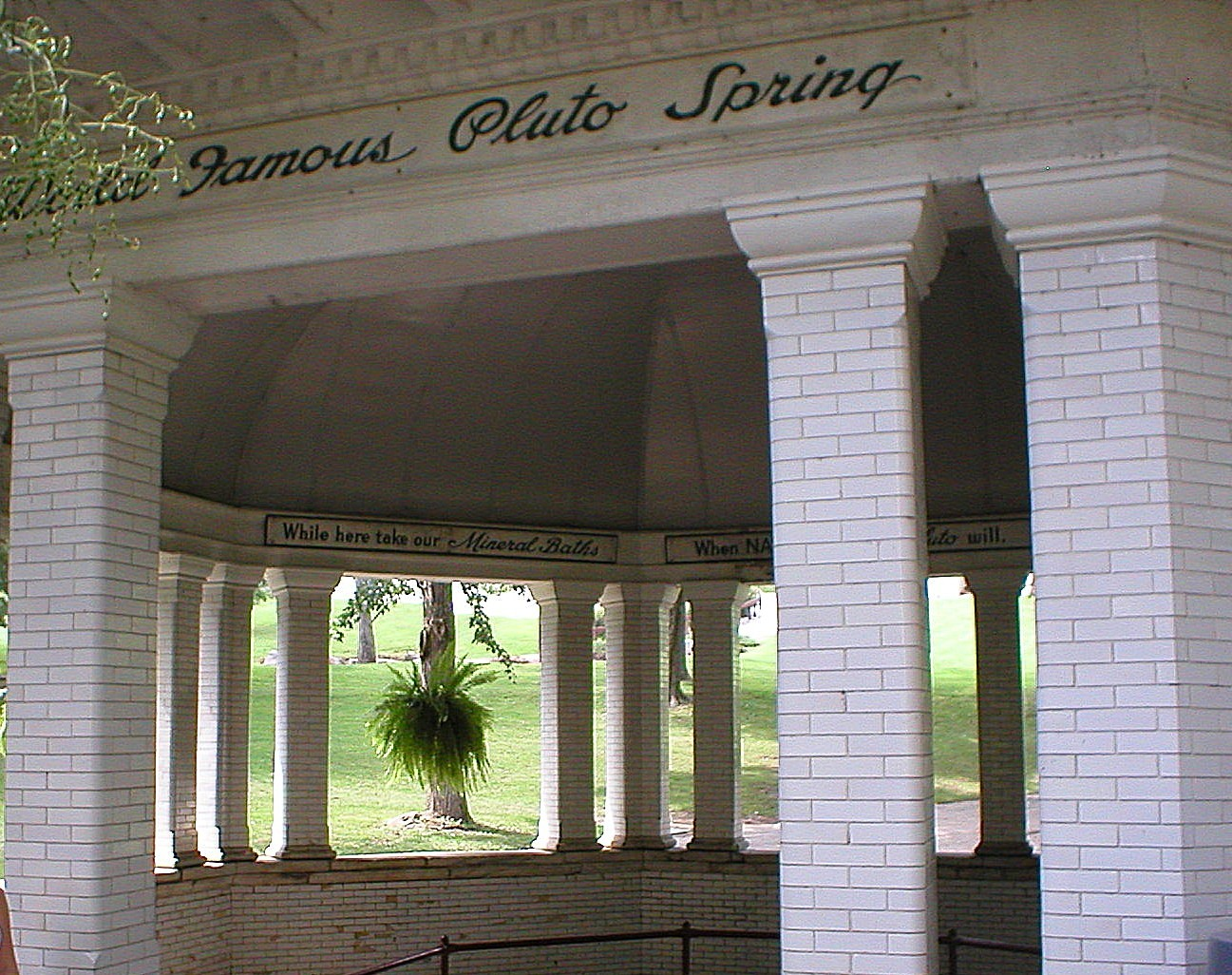
Pluto Spring

Revitalization of the hotel in the early twenty-first century began after considerable campaigning by Orange County residents, the Cook Group, Boykin Lodging (the hotel's owner), and Historic Landmarks Foundation of Indiana, who lobbied the Indiana General Assembly to allow casino gambling in the area. Legislation was finally approved in 2003 and the required local referendum easily passed. The Indiana Gaming Commission granted the long-promised operating license for a riverboat casino to The Trump Organization, headed by businessman Donald Trump, but a variety of reasons caused the selection process to begin again. A partnership of business interests from within Indiana, including billionaire Bill Cook, submitted an application for a gambling license before purchasing the French Lick Springs Hotel from Boykin Lodging. The partnership was awarded the license during the summer of 2005.

The French Lick Resort Casino complex includes the French Lick Springs Hotel, adjacent casino, and the nearby West Baden Springs Hotel. The French Lick hotel was restored as part of a $382 million project that included construction of the new casino. Refurbishments to the multi-structure French Lick hotel included updating its 443 guest rooms and restoration of the lobby, among other improvements. The renovated hotel and new casino complex opened together on November 3, 2006.

The French Lick resort, which is located on approximately 2,600 acres (1,100 hectares), today includes the hotel, a casino, restaurants, boutique shops, a spa, and a conference center. Its recreational facilities offer guests swimming pools, three golf courses, a bowling alley, fitness center, stables for horses, and more than thirty miles of hiking trails.

=== Pluto Water ===
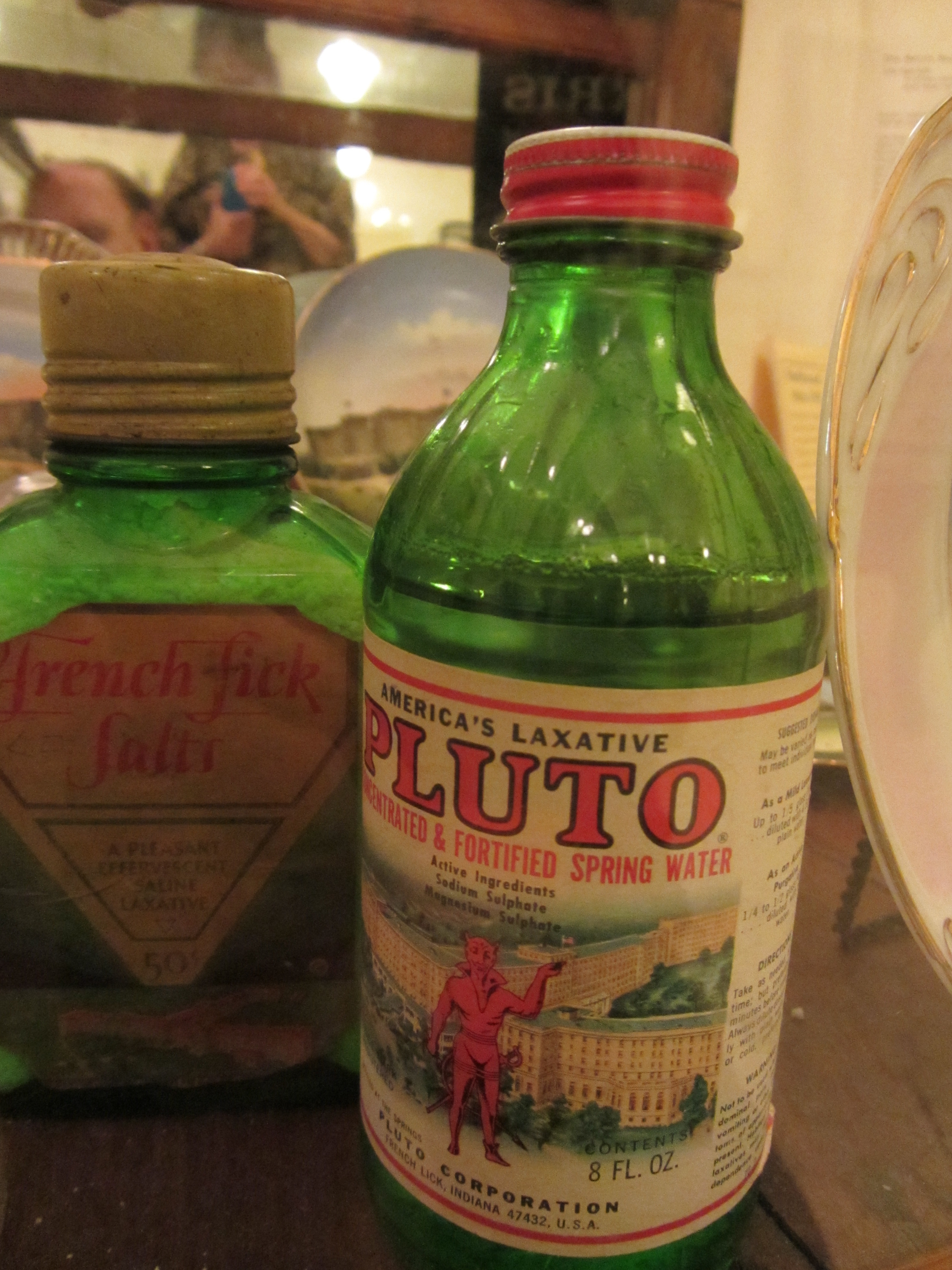
Antique bottle of Pluto Water

French Lick's spring water, trademarked as Pluto Water, was served to guests at the hotel's Pluto Bar, just off the main entrance. The water was bottled at a plant across the street from the hotel for consumption on the property and for commercial distribution nationally and internationally. Pluto Water's slogan, "If Nature Won't, Pluto Will," promoted its effectiveness as a laxative.

== Notable guests ==
Chris Bundy has written that French Lick and West Baden "were the Disney World of their time." It was known in Europe, as well. Over the years many of the country's rich and famous came as guests or gave performances at the resort. French Lick's visitors included moguls, movie stars, and entertainers such as John Barrymore, Howard Hughes, Lana Turner, Bob Hope, Bing Crosby, Hoagy Carmichael, Duke Ellington, Irving Berlin, and Louis Armstrong; noted politicians such as Franklin D. Roosevelt, Harry S. Truman, Richard Nixon, and Ronald Reagan; wealthy socialites, such as members of the Vanderbilt family; and others.

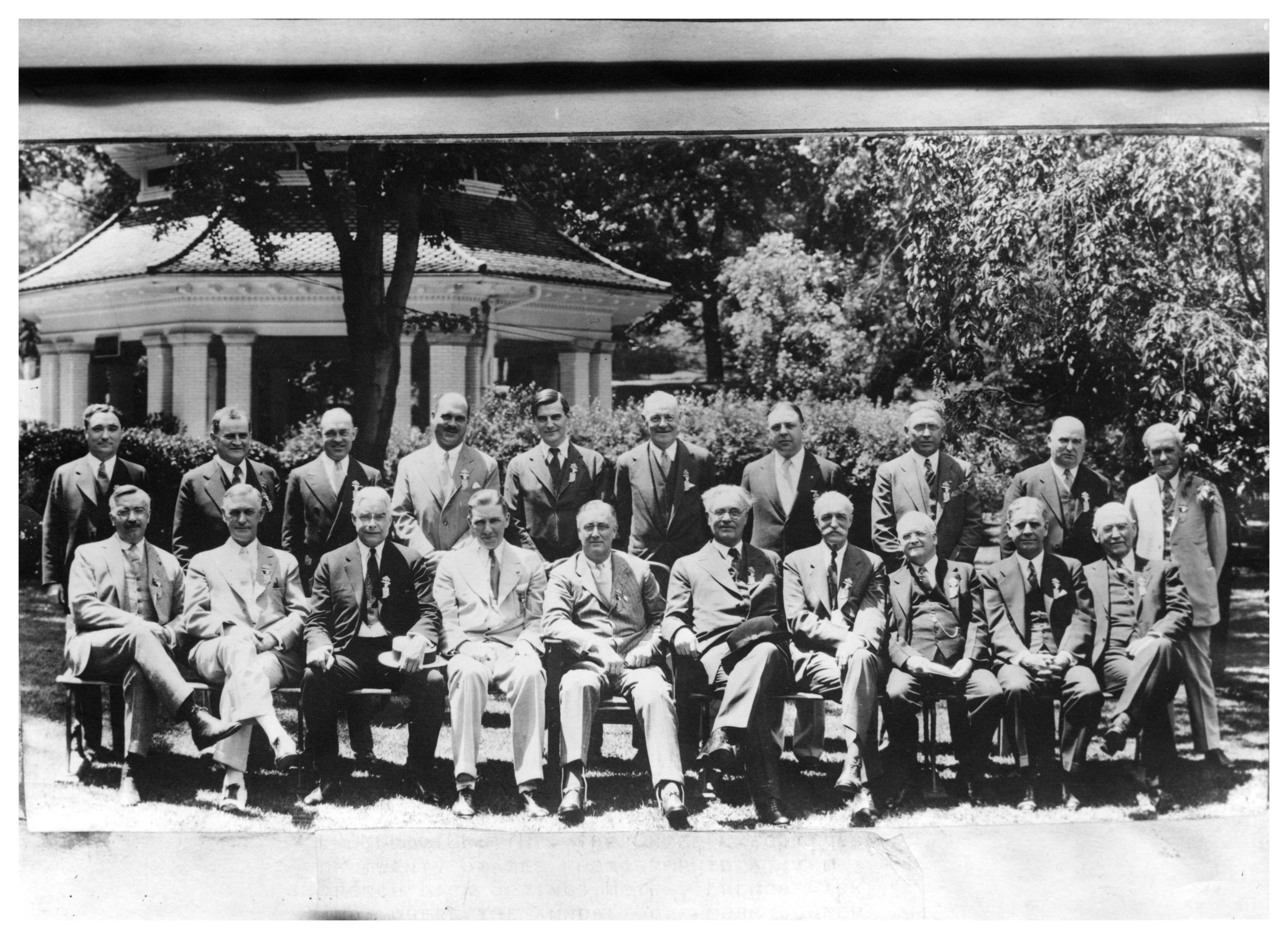
02 June 1931, Governors Conference, French Lick Springs Hotel, French Lick, Indiana

== Gambling ==
Although casino gambling at French Lick and West Baden Springs was illegal under Indiana law until the early 2000s, it flourished there from the early 1900s until the mid-1940s. There were several casinos in operation within Orange County, including Ed Ballard's casino at West Baden Springs, Al Brown's casino at French Lick, and one named The Gorge, among several others. A two-story, wood-framed structure in the middle of the French Lick hotel's Japanese gardens may have been used as a casino in the early twentieth century, although the building was identified in promotional materials as a place for bowling and dice games. Taggart denied any connections to illegal gambling operations.

In 1904 Indiana's Republican governor, Frank Hanly, instigated a raid at the hotel and seized its gambling equipment. The state brought suit against Taggart, French Lick's owner, and Lee Sinclair, owner of the West Baden Springs Hotel, but the court case bogged down when Hanley's Democratic successor, Thomas R. Marshall, became Indiana's governor in 1908 and the suit was dropped. After the raid, gambling operations moved offsite to Brown's hotel, across the street from the French Lick Hotel. Illegal gambling continued away from the resort until 1949, when Indiana's governor, Henry Schricker, succeeded in getting the authorities to raid illegal gambling operations at French Lick, and Brown's casino was finally closed.

Legalized casino gambling came to French Lick in 2006, when the new French Lick Resort Casino opened as a part of the resort complex.

== Negro league baseball club: French Lick Plutos ==
The French Lick Plutos were an independent Negro league baseball club from 1912 to 1914. Likely consisting for a large part of waiters at the resort, they had started off as a mixed team in 1908 but were all-Black the next year; their main rival was the team from the nearby West Baden Springs Hotel, the West Baden Sprudels. Games were played at the resort to amuse the spectators, but were fiercely competitive nonetheless. Negro league clubs including the Indianapolis ABCs would frequently come and play at French Lick. Historian Paul Debono notes the connection between African-American baseball players, employment, and local demographics: when the resorts in the area were booming, the owners needed laborers and frequently those were African-Americans from nearby Kentucky; the local African-American population increased greatly between 1880 and 1900, from one to 124, and in 1920 there were 325, of which over 100 "listed their occupation as waiter", followed by bell-boy and porter; 2/3 of the town's African-American population hailed from Kentucky. According to Debono, "the tradition of black baseball teams continued until the Great Depression, when most of the blacks at the resort lost their jobs". In the 1940s still, French Lick was a venue for spring training for professional baseball teams.

== Golf ==
In the early twentieth century, when golf was beginning to gain popularity, the resort expanded its modest golf facilities. Around 1907 it is believed that Thomas Taggart hired Tom Bendelow to enlarge the Valley Course, the resort's first golf course, to an eighteen-hole course on 120 acres (49 hectares). The course design, attributed to Bendelow, featured a combination of wooded hills and flat turf. The one-story Valley clubhouse (circa 1915) was built during Taggart's tenure as the resort's owner. The painted brick, American Craftsman-style bungalow, which replaced an earlier building, is located northeast of the hotel's north wing. Caddies waited in the clubhouse's lower level for their turn to serve the course's patrons.

Around 1917 Donald Ross and his associates designed the eighteen-hole Hill Course, the resort's second golf course. Completed in 1920 on approximately 300 acres (120 hectares), the championship course was located about 2 miles (3.2 km) from the hotel. At the time of its construction, the hilly terrain was modified to create challenges for golfers by varying elevations and adding hazards. The course hosted the PGA Championship tournament in 1924, which Walter Hagen won. The course's 1 1/2-story, wood-framed clubhouse with verandas along two sides was built in 1940 as a replacement for an earlier brick clubhouse. Its main floor was used for dining, socializing, equipment sales, and office space; the lower level contained locker rooms and rest rooms.

== Gardens ==
The hotel was noted for its gardens; postcard views of them were reprinted for decades. A large formal "Italian" garden was laid out in the 1910s. A Japanese garden with pond, waterfall, Japanese-style concrete lanterns and bronze crane statues was built by Chicago Japanese garden builder T.R. Otsuka around 1920.

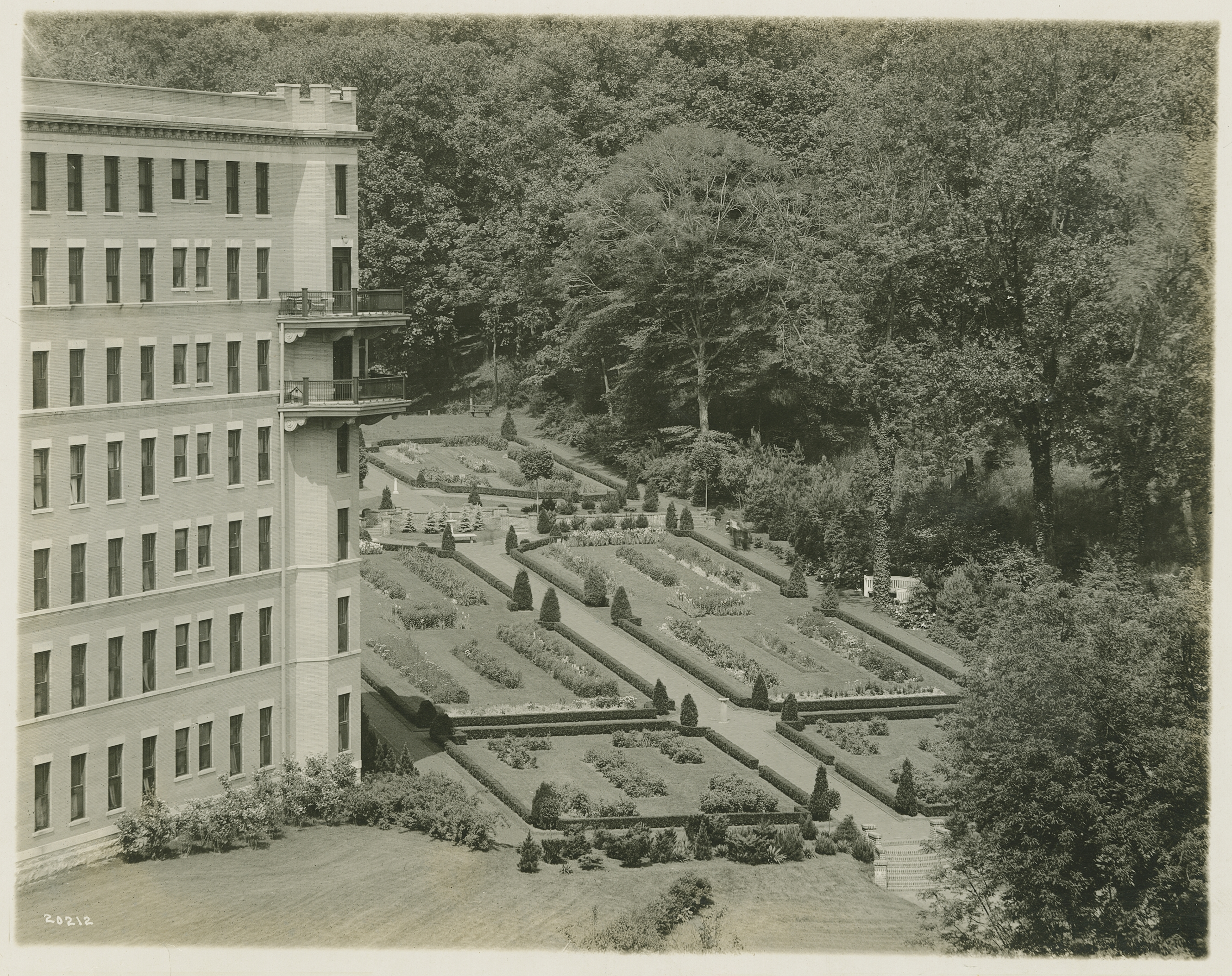
Formal Gardens at the French Lick Springs Hotel, c.1913

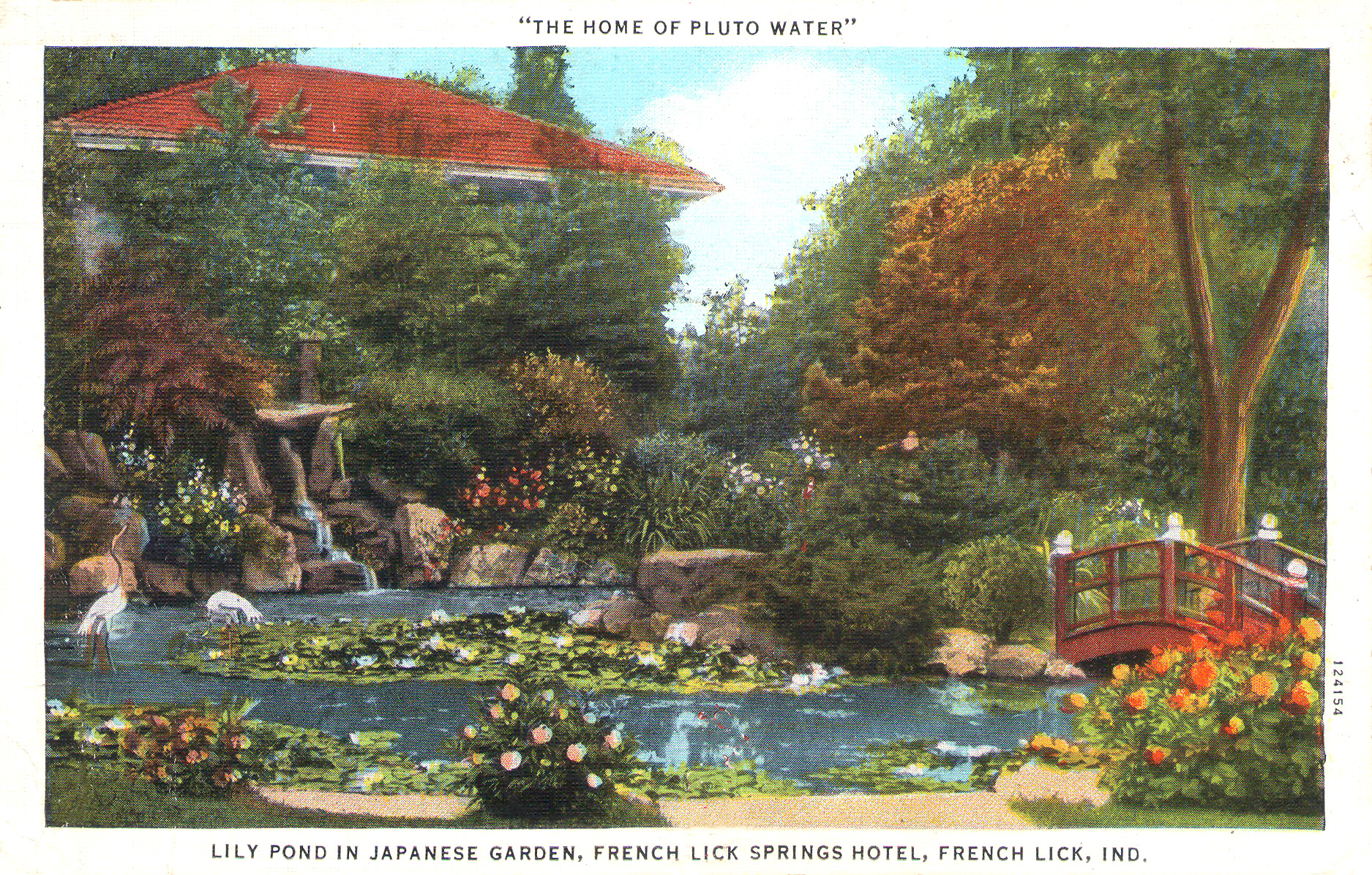
The Japanese Garden at French Lick Springs Hotel, 1920s

== Notable events ==
- Tomato juice is said to have been served for the first time at the hotel in 1917 when the chef Louis Perrin ran out of orange juice and needed an alternative.
- When Taggart served as chairman of the Democratic National Committee, the hotel became its unofficial headquarters. In 1931, during a Democratic governors' conference held at the hotel, Franklin D. Roosevelt came to find support among its attendees in his bid to become the Democratic Party's nominee for U.S. president.
- Production of Pluto Water ceased in 1971, after lithium, a natural occurrence in the water, became classified as a controlled substance used in the treatment of bipolar disorder.

== Recognition ==
- The French Lick Springs Hotel was listed on the National Register of Historic Places in 2003.
- The National Trust for Historic Preservation has included the hotel in its Historic Hotels of America program.
