= Indiana Sports Hall of Fame =

The Indiana Sports Hall of Fame is a hall of fame that honors sports achievements by athletes, coaches, administrators, officials, broadcasters, and journalists in the U.S. state of Indiana. Founded in 2020, the Indiana Sports Hall of Fame does not have a physical location, though plans exist to build a museum – formerly in Evansville, then at Irvington Plaza in Indianapolis, and most recently proposed at the Marion County Fairgrounds, also in Indianapolis.

== Inductees ==
Sortable table
Name	Contribution	Year Inducted
Clint Barmes	Baseball	2020
Andy Benes	Baseball	2020
Mordecai Brown	Baseball	2020
Jamey Carroll	Baseball	2020
Carl Erskine	Baseball	2020
Chuck Harmon	Baseball	2020
Lanny Harris	Baseball	2020
Gil Hodges	Baseball	2020
Tommy John	Baseball	2020
Chuck Klein	Baseball	2020
Don Larsen	Baseball	2020
Kenny Lofton	Baseball	2020
Don Mattingly	Baseball	2020
Scott Rolen	Baseball	2020
Edd Roush	Baseball	2020
Tim Turpin	Baseball	2020
Bob Warn	Baseball	2020
Steve Alford	Basketball	2020
Damon Bailey	Basketball	2020
Kent Benson	Basketball	2020
Ted Bernhardt	Basketball	2020
Larry Bird	Basketball	2020
Brad Brownell	Basketball	2020
Quinn Buckner	Basketball	2020
Don Buse	Basketball	2020
Calbert Cheaney	Basketball	2020
Louie Dampier	Basketball	2020
Bob Ford	Basketball	2020
Eric Gordon	Basketball	2020
Del Harris	Basketball	2020
Gene Keady	Basketball	2020
Shawn Kemp	Basketball	2020
Bob Knight	Basketball	2020
Kyle Macy	Basketball	2020
Walter McCarty	Basketball	2020
Branch McCracken	Basketball	2020
Arad McCutchan	Basketball	2020
George McGinnis	Basketball	2020
Muffet McGraw	Basketball	2020
Reggie Miller	Basketball	2020
Rick Mount	Basketball	2020
Bruce Pearl	Basketball	2020
Digger Phelps	Basketball	2020
Zach Randolph	Basketball	2020
Oscar Robertson	Basketball	2020
Glenn Robinson	Basketball	2020
Dave Schellhase	Basketball	2020
Herbert Simon	Basketball	2020
Scott Skiles	Basketball	2020
Jerry Sloan	Basketball	2020
Dan Sparks	Basketball	2020
Isiah Thomas	Basketball	2020
Tara VanDerveer	Basketball	2020
John Wooden	Basketball	2020
Jackie Young	Basketball	2020
Tom Johnson	Boxing	2020
Dick Weber	Bowling	2020
Hilliard Gates	Sports broadcasting	2020
Dave Niehaus	Sports broadcasting	2020
Marty Amsler	American football	2020
Morten Andersen	American football	2020
Drew Brees	American football	2020
Tim Brown	American football	2020
David Carter	American football	2020
Deke Cooper	American football	2020
Jay Cutler	American football	2020
Len Dawson	American football	2020
Ken Dilger	American football	2020
Jeff George	American football	2020
Bob Griese	American football	2020
Kevin Hardy	American football	2020
Lou Holtz	American football	2020
Jim Irsay	American football	2020
Robert Irsay	American football	2020
Peyton Manning	American football	2020
Rocket Ismail	American football	2020
Joe Montana	American football	2020
John Parry	American football	2020
Ara Parseghian	American football	2020
Knute Rockne	American football	2020
Scott Studwell	American football	2020
Rod Woodson	American football	2020
Bob Hamilton	Golf	2020
Jeff Overton	Golf	2020
Fuzzy Zoeller	Golf	2020
Mike Blake	Sports journalism	2020
Mary Fendrich Hulman	Motor sports	2020
A. J. Foyt	Motor sports	2020
Jeff Gordon	Motor sports	2020
Tony Hulman	Motor sports	2020
Forrest Lucas	Motor sports	2020
Ryan Newman	Motor sports	2020
Roger Penske	Motor sports	2020
Tony Stewart	Motor sports	2020
DeMarcus Beasley	Soccer	2020
Josh Tudela	Soccer	2020
Lilly King	Swimming	2020
Mark Spitz	Swimming	2020
Mike Pegram	Thoroughbred racing	2020
Ray Ewry	Track and field	2020
Bruce Baumgartner	Wrestling	2020
Mick Foley	Professional wrestling	2020
Gene Cato	Sports administration	2021
Chuck Crabb	Sports administration	2021
Bruce Schumacher	Sports administration	2021
Max B. Schumacher	Sports administration	2021
Kevin Brown	Baseball	2021
Jim Brownlee	Baseball	2021
Max Carey	Baseball	2021
Oscar Charleston	Baseball	2021
George Foster	Baseball	2021
Kirk Gibson	Baseball	2021
Terry Gobert	Baseball	2021
Ken Griffey Sr.	Baseball	2021
Jim Haaff	Baseball	2021
Billy Herman	Baseball	2021
Jim Leyland	Baseball	2021
Ray Miller	Baseball	2021
Art Nehf	Baseball	2021
Sam Rice	Baseball	2021
Amos Rusie	Baseball	2021
Jeff Schulz	Baseball	2021
Bob Snyder	Baseball	2021
Tim Stoddard	Baseball	2021
Harold "Buddy" Swift	Baseball	2021
Tom Abernathy	Basketball	2021
Jack Butcher	Basketball	2021
Austin Carr	Basketball	2021
Tamika Catchings	Basketball	2021
Jim Crews	Basketball	2021
Crispus Attucks High School 1955 boys' basketball team	Basketball	2021
Adrian Dantley	Basketball	2021
Terry Dischinger	Basketball	2021
Stan Gouard	Basketball	2021
Pat Graham	Basketball	2021
Bill Green	Basketball	2021
Roger Kaiser	Basketball	2021
Slick Leonard	Basketball	2021
Clyde Lovellette	Basketball	2021
Scott May	Basketball	2021
Willie Merriweather	Basketball	2021
1954 Milan High School basketball team	Basketball	2021
Bobby Plump	Basketball	2021
Wayne Radford	Basketball	2021
Bob Reinhart	Basketball	2021
Jake Weber	Basketball	2021
Stephanie White	Basketball	2021
Randy Wittman	Basketball	2021
Bobby Wilkerson	Basketball	2021
Mike Woodson	Basketball	2021
Joby Wright	Basketball	2021
Cody Zeller	Basketball	2021
Luke Zeller	Basketball	2021
Tyler Zeller	Basketball	2021
Jack Callahan	Boxing	2021
Adam Alexander	Sports broadcasting	2021
Bob Chase	Sports broadcasting	2021
Mike Collins	Sports broadcasting	2021
Keith Doades	Sports broadcasting	2021
Walt Ferber	Sports broadcasting	2021
Richard Lankford	Sports broadcasting	2021
Bob Lovel	Sports broadcasting	2021
Mike Alstott	American football	2021
Marc Anderson	American football	2021
Jerome Bettis	American football	2021
Jerry Brewer	American football	2021
Herman Byers	American football	2021
Mark Clayton	American football	2021
Dick Dullaghan	American football	2021
Vaughn Dunbar	American football	2021
Marshall Faulk	American football	2021
Don Hansen	American football	2021
Tom Harmon	American football	2021
Mark Herrmann	American football	2021
Paul Hornung	American football	2021
Alex Karras	American football	2021
Leroy Keyes	American football	2021
Bob Kuechenberg	American football	2021
Larry Stallings	American football	2021
Anthony Thompson	American football	2021
Larry Wright	American football	2021
Kurt Thomas	Gymnastics	2021
John Liles	Ice hockey	2021
David Haugh	Sports journalism	2021
Steven Stremming	Sports journalism	2021
Pete Swanson	Sports journalism	2021
Bob Williams	Sports journalism	2021
John Force	Motor sports	2021
Steve Kinser	Motor sports	2021
James Dunlap	Officiating	2021
Bill Nimnicht	Officiating	2021
David Boudia	Diving	2021
James Counsilman	Swimming	2021
Stephanie Reece	Tennis	2021
Greg Bell	Track and field	2021
Ivan Fuqua	Track and field	2021
John McNichols	Track and field	2021
Maicel Malone-Wallace	Track and field	2021
Dave Shondell	Volleyball	2021
Bobby Cox	Sports administration	2022
Phil Eskew	Sports administration	2022
Janis Qualizza	Sports administration	2022
Arthur L. Trester	Sports administration	2022
Bob Alles	Baseball	2022
Dottie Wiltse Collins	Baseball	2022
Paul Gries	Baseball	2022
Jerry Hargis	Baseball	2022
LaTroy Hawkins	Baseball	2022
Ray Howard	Baseball	2022
Wallace Johnson	Baseball	2022
Ron Kittle	Baseball	2022
Lance Lynn	Baseball	2022
Lloyd McClendon	Baseball	2022
Quentin Merkel	Baseball	2022
Randy Miller	Baseball	2022
Hal Morris	Baseball	2022
Jeff Samardzija	Baseball	2022
Steve Schroer	Baseball	2022
Kyle Schwarber	Baseball	2022
Darrell Stephens	Baseball	2022
Walt Terrell	Baseball	2022
Pat Underwood	Baseball	2022
Tom Underwood	Baseball	2022
Marty Watson	Baseball	2022
Owen Wells	Baseball	2022
1975–76 Indiana Hoosiers men's basketball team	Basketball	2022
Sam Alford	Basketball	2022
Jacqueline Batteast	Basketball	2022
Junior Bridgeman	Basketball	2022
Donna Cheatham	Basketball	2022
Tricia Cullop	Basketball	2022
Skylar Diggins-Smith	Basketball	2022
Gus Doerner	Basketball	2022
Bryce Drew	Basketball	2022
Homer Drew	Basketball	2022
Scott Drew	Basketball	2022
Jay Edwards	Basketball	2022
Bill Garrett	Basketball	2022
Steve Green	Basketball	2022
Gordon Hayward	Basketball	2022
Tony Hinkle	Basketball	2022
Lyndon Jones	Basketball	2022
John Laskowski	Basketball	2022
Dave Magley	Basketball	2022
Patrick Manahan	Basketball	2022
Cuonzo Martin	Basketball	2022
Bob McAdoo	Basketball	2022
Sheila McMillan	Basketball	2022
Beth Morgan Cunningham	Basketball	2022
Bob Netolicky	Basketball	2022
Carl Nicks	Basketball	2022
John Paxson	Basketball	2022
Vernon Payne	Basketball	2022
Gregg Popovich	Basketball	2022
Billy Powell	Basketball	2022
Jimmy Rayl	Basketball	2022
Jerry Reynolds	Basketball	2022
Ruth Riley	Basketball	2022
Mike Sandifar	Basketball	2022
Bill Shepherd	Basketball	2022
Billy Shepherd	Basketball	2022
Dave Shepherd	Basketball	2022
Keith Smart	Basketball	2022
Brad Stevens	Basketball	2022
Pete Trgovich	Basketball	2022
Kelly Tripucka	Basketball	2022
Dick Van Arsdale	Basketball	2022
Tom Van Arsdale	Basketball	2022
Mike Warren	Basketball	2022
Jodie Whitaker	Basketball	2022
Jumping Johnny Wilson	Basketball	2022
Jennifer Childers	Boxing	2022
Eva Jones	Boxing	2022
Daniel Maldonado	Boxing	2022
Danny Thomas	Boxing	2022
Mike Aulby	Bowling	2022
E. J. Tackett	Bowling	2022
Tom Carnegie	Sports broadcasting	2022
Paul Page	Sports broadcasting	2022
Sam Simmermaker	Sports broadcasting	2022
LaVern Gibson	Cross country	2022
Chuck Koeppen	Cross country	2022
Bill Lowen	Sport fishing	2022
Cam Cameron	American football	2022
Tony Dungy	American football	2022
Ken Kaczmarek	American football	2022
Ryan Kerrigan	American football	2022
Andrew Luck	American football	2022
Tony McGee	American football	2022
Earl Milligan	American football	2022
Joe Theismann	American football	2022
Joe Tiller	American football	2022
Sharon Most	Golf	2022
Sandra Spuzich	Golf	2022
Brian Tennyson	Golf	2022
Bo Van Pelt	Golf	2022
Jaycie Phelps	Gymnastics	2022
Bridget Sloan	Gymnastics	2022
Mark Morrow	Sports journalism	2022
Donald Joe Decker	Multi-sport	2022
Clint Keown	Multi-sport	2022
Matt Kinzer	Multi-sport	2022
Mike Madriaga	Multi-sport	2022
Vaughn Wedeking	Multi-sport	2022
Nick Goepper	Skiing	2022
Lauren Holiday	Soccer	2022
Jerry Little	Soccer	2022
Greg Mauch	Soccer	2022
Bill Vieth	Soccer	2022
Jerry Yeagley	Soccer	2022
Todd Yeagley	Soccer	2022
Mark Cuban	Sports fandom	2022
John Mellencamp	Sports fandom	2022
Lindsay Benko	Swimming	2022
Chris Plum	Swimming	2022
Shawn Foltz	Tennis	2022
Louise Owen	Tennis	2022
Amy Yoder Begley	Track and field	2022
John Campbell	Track and field	2022
Lloy Ball	Volleyball	2022
Don Shondell	Volleyball	2022
John Mark Hall	Sports administration	2023
Blake Ress	Sports administration	2023
Tracy Archuleta	Baseball	2023
Tim Barrett	Baseball	2023
Eric Campbell	Baseball	2023
Wes Carroll	Baseball	2023
Tom Davis	Baseball	2023
Boots Day	Baseball	2023
Mark Fidrych	Baseball	2023
Pete Fox	Baseball	2023
Andy Hoffman	Baseball	2023
Joe Lis	Baseball	2023
Darren Lynam	Baseball	2023
Rob Maurer	Baseball	2023
Ron Milovich	Baseball	2023
Brent Owens	Baseball	2023
Mick Owens	Baseball	2023
Lance Parrish	Baseball	2023
Steve Patchin	Baseball	2023
Dave Pishkur	Baseball	2023
Gary Redman	Baseball	2023
Mark Riggins	Baseball	2023
Ken Schreiber	Baseball	2023
Pat Schulz	Baseball	2023
Donny Shemwell	Baseball	2023
Keith Shepherd	Baseball	2023
Nate Shepherd	Baseball	2023
John Smith	Baseball	2023
C. I. Taylor	Baseball	2023
Mitch Waters	Baseball	2023
Woody Austin	Basketball	2023
Julie Helm-Chapman	Basketball	2023
Cheryl Cook	Basketball	2023
Dan Dakich	Basketball	2023
Katie Douglas	Basketball	2023
Scott Fields	Basketball	2023
Linda Godby	Basketball	2023
Vicki Hall	Basketball	2023
Bill Hodges	Basketball	2023
J. R. Holmes	Basketball	2023
Mark Jewell	Basketball	2023
Jim Jones	Basketball	2023
Romeo Langford	Basketball	2023
Ray McCallum	Basketball	2023
Charlie Mair	Basketball	2023
Gene Miiller	Basketball	2023
Staci Mueller	Basketball	2023
Ralph O'Brien	Basketball	2023
Matt Painter	Basketball	2023
Debbie Walker	Basketball	2023
Bonzi Wells	Basketball	2023
Sherron Wilkerson	Basketball	2023
Marcus Wilson	Basketball	2023
Linda Anne Yearby	Basketball	2023
Victorio Belcher	Boxing	2023
Harold Brazier	Boxing	2023
Jeff Bumpus	Boxing	2023
Colion Chaney	Boxing	2023
Lamon Brewster	Boxing	2023
Dennis Hardesty	Boxing	2023
Marty Jakubowski	Boxing	2023
Marvin Johnson	Boxing	2023
Larry R. Young	Boxing	2023
Sue Kunkle	Softball	2023
La Ferne Price	Softball	2023
Erika Taylor Denton	Softball	2023
Gordon Wood	Softball	2023
Mike Wilson	Softball	2023
Erich Barnes	American football	2023
Sean Bennett	American football	2023
Bill Brooks	American football	2023
Roosevelt Colvin	American football	2023
Chris Doleman	American football	2023
Tony Fisher	American football	2023
Bob Gaddis	American football	2023
Trent Green	American football	2023
Rex Grossman	American football	2023
Marvin Harrison	American football	2023
Chris Hinton	American football	2023
Rudy Kuechenberg	American football	2023
Zach Martin	American football	2023
Mike Neal	American football	2023
Ryan Neal	American football	2023
Bernie Parmalee	American football	2023
Tim Shipp	American football	2023
Kevin Speer	American football	2023
Billy Strother	American football	2023
George Taliaferro	American football	2023
Terry Tallen	American football	2023
Adam Vinatieri	American football	2023
Reggie Wayne	American football	2023
Jamel Williams	American football	2023
Nathan Charnes	Golf	2023
Therese Hession	Golf	2023
1997 Martinsville High School girls' golf team	Golf	2023
1998 Noblesville High School boys' golf team	Golf	2023
Kyle O'Brien Stevens	Golf	2023
Ken Wempe	Golf	2023
Mark Montieth	Sports journalism	2023
Scott Romer	Sports journalism	2023
Tony George	Motor sports	2023
George Stancombe	Motor sports	2023
Al Unser Jr.	Motor sports	2023
Wayne Boultinghouse	Multi-sport	2023
Kevin Cartwright	Multi-sport	2023
Earl Fisher	Multi-sport	2023
Indianapolis ABCs	Multi-sport	2023
Derek Lindauer	Multi-sport	2023
Matt Mauck	Multi-sport	2023
Steve Parrish	Multi-sport	2023
Jon Siau	Multi-sport	2023
David Small	Multi-sport	2023
Krissy Meek-Engelbrecht	Soccer	2023
Angie Werne Lensing	Soccer	2023
Angela Berry-White	Soccer	2023
Sam Schulz	Sports fandom	2023
Hobie Billingsley	Diving	2023
Ginny Purdy	Tennis	2023
Barbara Wynne	Tennis	2023
Holli Hyche	Track and field	2023
Lynna Irby	Track and field	2023
Beth Reid Lewis	Track and field	2023
Ashley Benson	Volleyball	2023
Jerry Lawler	Professional wrestling	2023
Rip Rogers	Professional wrestling	2023
Bob Gardner	Sports administration	2024
Paul Neidig	Sports administration	2024
Nevin Ashley	Baseball	2024
Chris Bootcheck	Baseball	2024
JD Closser	Baseball	2024
Jeff Closser	Baseball	2024
Steve DeGroote	Baseball	2024
Gary Denbo	Baseball	2024
Brian Dorsett	Baseball	2024
Bob Friend	Baseball	2024
Jerry Galema	Baseball	2024
Owen George	Baseball	2024
Kevin Kiermaier	Baseball	2024
Andy Rice	Baseball	2024
Paul Quinzer	Baseball	2024
Zane Smith	Baseball	2024
Drew Storen	Baseball	2024
Tim Terry	Baseball	2024
Joe Thatcher	Baseball	2024
Dickie Thon	Baseball	2024
Casey Whitten	Baseball	2024
Jeff Anderson	Basketball	2024
James Blackmon Sr.	Basketball	2024
Delray Brooks	Basketball	2024
Joe Barry Carroll	Basketball	2024
Steve Downing	Basketball	2024
Leroy Edwards	Basketball	2024
Dalonda Newton Hayes	Basketball	2024
Alan Henderson	Basketball	2024
Brian Hubbard	Basketball	2024
Larry Humes	Basketball	2024
Defferen Jones	Basketball	2024
Walter Jordan	Basketball	2024
Brent Kell	Basketball	2024
Jerry Lamberson	Basketball	2024
Michael Lewis	Basketball	2024
Troy Lewis	Basketball	2024
Evelyn Magley	Basketball	2024
Amy Metheny	Basketball	2024
Brian Miles	Basketball	2024
Harold Miles	Basketball	2024
Eric Montross	Basketball	2024
Mike Muff	Basketball	2024
Lee Nailon	Basketball	2024
Craig Neal	Basketball	2024
Greg Oden	Basketball	2024
Bobby Pritchett	Basketball	2024
Jim Shannon	Basketball	2024
Jerry Sichting	Basketball	2024
Rik Smits	Basketball	2024
Dirkk Surles	Basketball	2024
Travis Trice	Basketball	2024
John Sherman Williams	Basketball	2024
Claude Williams Jr.	Basketball	2024
Tim Mack	Bowling	2024
George Branham III	Bowling	2024
Sydney Brummett	Bowling	2024
Pat Dyer	Bowling	2024
Jerry Brown	Boxing	2024
Sam Gibson	Boxing	2024
Eric Jones	Boxing	2024
Hardy Jones	Boxing	2024
James Shorter	Boxing	2024
Bill Stegemoller	Cross country	2024
Jim Bates	Softball	2024
Lou Ann Hopson	Softball	2024
Russ Milligan	Softball	2024
Paul Lamb	Softball	2024
Pat Lockyear	Softball	2024
Audra Sanders Roth	Softball	2024
Gerhard Ahting	American football	2024
Fred Arrington	American football	2024
Derek Barnett	American football	2024
Anthony Barr	American football	2024
Angelo Bertelli	American football	2024
Chris Bosmer	American football	2024
Tim Clifford	American football	2024
Lee Corso	American football	2024
Jack Doyle	American football	2024
Jim Everett	American football	2024
Jon Gruden	American football	2024
Jim Harbaugh	American football	2024
Mark Harkrader	American football	2024
Leon Hart	American football	2024
Hanz Hoag	American football	2024
Les Horvath	American football	2024
John Huarte	American football	2024
James Hurst	American football	2024
Johnny Lattner	American football	2024
John Lidy	American football	2024
John Lujack	American football	2024
Marcus Merriweather	American football	2024
Rick Mirer	American football	2024
Bernard Pollard	American football	2024
Dan Powers	American football	2024
MyCole Pruitt	American football	2024
Antwaan Randle El	American football	2024
Joe Roman	American football	2024
Damon Watts	American football	2024
Steve Weatherford	American football	2024
Donald Brashear	Ice hockey	2024
Jack Johnson	Ice hockey	2024
Dale Purinton	Ice hockey	2024
Zach Trotman	Ice hockey	2024
Bill Walker	Sports broadcasting	2024
Hélio Castroneves	Motor sports	2024
Dario Franchitti	Motor sports	2024
Rick Mears	Motor sports	2024
Al Unser Sr.	Motor sports	2024
Tarron Acuff	Multi-sport	2024
Mike Coin	Multi-sport	2024
Larry Parrott	Multi-sport	2024
Levron Williams	Multi-sport	2024
Jimmy Beasley	Officiating	2024
Mike Devine	Officiating	2024
Brad Maxey	Officiating	2024
Bob Showalter	Officiating	2024
Max Lachowecki	Soccer	2024
Tim Vieth	Soccer	2024
Angelo Pizzo	Sports filmmaking	2024
Elissa Kim	Tennis	2024
Carrie Meyer	Tennis	2024
Rajeev Ram	Tennis	2024
Lanae Renschler	Tennis	2024
Todd Witsken	Tennis	2024
Tori Bliss	Track and field	2024
Bryce Brown	Track and field	2024
Richard Garland	Track and field	2024
Cornell Garrett	Track and field	2024
Ryan Hayden	Track and field	2024
Chris Norris	Track and field	2024
Rory Norris	Track and field	2024
John Nunn	Track and field	2024
Charlie Siesky	Track and field	2024
Steve Smith	Track and field	2024
Bob Winchell	Track and field	2024
Ann Bastianelli	Volleyball	2024
Priscilla Dillow	Volleyball	2024
Patricia Roy	Volleyball	2024
Kay Hutsell	Wrestling	2024
Don Patton	Wrestling	2024
Rex Peckinpaugh	Wrestling	2024
Robert Faulkins	Sports administration	2025
Fred Glass	Sports administration	2025
Joe Herrmann	Sports administration	2025
Victoria Maione	Sports administration	2025
Tom Alles	Baseball	2025
Aaron Barrett	Baseball	2025
Jay Buente	Baseball	2025
Todd Dunwoody	Baseball	2025
Jerad Eickhoff	Baseball	2025
Jason Engelbrecht	Baseball	2025
Dave Gandolph	Baseball	2025
Alex Graman	Baseball	2025
B. J. Huff	Baseball	2025
Phil Kendall	Baseball	2025
Robbie Kent Jr.	Baseball	2025
Bart Kaufman	Baseball	2025
Joe Keusch	Baseball	2025
Dirk Lindauer	Baseball	2025
Joe Lis Jr.	Baseball	2025
Dan MacNamara	Baseball	2025
Steve Mitchell	Baseball	2025
Randall Moss	Baseball	2025
Tony Myszak	Baseball	2025
Andy Noblitt	Baseball	2025
Tony Ochs	Baseball	2025
Russell Peach	Baseball	2025
Heath Phillips	Baseball	2025
Mitch Stetter	Baseball	2025
Dick Barnett	Basketball	2025
Curt Begle	Basketball	2025
Kim Bilskie	Basketball	2025
Mike Broughton	Basketball	2025
Cinda Brown	Basketball	2025
Shane Burkhart	Basketball	2025
Abby Conklin	Basketball	2025
Mike Conley Jr.	Basketball	2025
Jan Conner	Basketball	2025
Walt Davis	Basketball	2025
Jeff Doyle	Basketball	2025
Terry Cummings	Basketball	2025
Andy Elkins	Basketball	2025
Jay Frye	Basketball	2025
Jason Gardner	Basketball	2025
Chad Gilbert	Basketball	2025
Diondre Ross Givens	Basketball	2025
Gary Grider	Basketball	2025
A. J. Guyton	Basketball	2025
Scott Haffner	Basketball	2025
Ron Hancock	Basketball	2025
Amber Harris	Basketball	2025
Jack Hogan	Basketball	2025
Brian Huebner	Basketball	2025
Ron Hancock	Basketball	2025
Allen D. Jackson	Basketball	2025
Jared Jeffries	Basketball	2025
Nate Kaufman	Basketball	2025
Lloyd Kerr	Basketball	2025
Ted Kitchel	Basketball	2025
Vicki Lander	Basketball	2025
Chris Lowery	Basketball	2025
Rick Marshall	Basketball	2025
Ed McCormick	Basketball	2025
Brad Miller	Basketball	2025
Lee Nailon	Basketball	2025
DeWayne Norris	Basketball	2025
Rebekah Parker	Basketball	2025
Dave Ragland	Basketball	2025
Ta'Shia Phillips	Basketball	2025
Kurt Rambis	Basketball	2025
Glenn Robinson III	Basketball	2025
Ron Hancock	Basketball	2025
Terry Stotts	Basketball	2025
Peyton Stovall	Basketball	2025
Cecil Tague	Basketball	2025
Jeff Teague	Basketball	2025
Richard E. Russell	Bowling	2025
Mike Branham	American football	2025
Mark Deal	American football	2025
Mike Deal	American football	2025
Russell Deal	American football	2025
Jason Edwards	American football	2025
Joey Elliott	American football	2025
John Elliott	American football	2025
Jeff Gardner	American football	2025
John Hart	American football	2025
Ott Hurrle	American football	2025
Dale Jennings	American football	2025
Lonnie Johnson	American football	2025
Matt Lindsey	American football	2025
Vince Lorenzano	American football	2025
Carl C. Lyles III	American football	2025
Pat McAfee	American football	2025
Ken Mills Jr.	American football	2025
Ken Mills Sr.	American football	2025
Fred B. Mitchell	American football	2025
Tony D'Orazio	American football	2025
Curtis Painter	American football	2025
Mike Prior	American football	2025
Bruce Scifres	American football	2025
Rick Streiff	American football	2025
Dan Stryzinski	American football	2025
Brent Tisdale	American football	2025
Bryant Young	American football	2025
Chris Zorich	American football	2025
Patti Buchta	Softball	2025
Emily Goodin	Softball	2025
Becky Lis	Softball	2025
Craig Bowden	Golf	2025
Billy Kratzert	Golf	2025
Cathy Gerring	Golf	2025
William Kratzert Jr.	Golf	2025
Tim Crowley	Ice hockey	2025
Andy Arney	Sports journalism	2025
Bob Bridge	Sports journalism	2025
Dick Enberg	Sports broadcasting	2025
Terence Moore	Sports journalism	2025
Greg Rakestraw	Sports broadcasting	2025
Dave Rinehart	Sports broadcasting / Sports journalism	2025
Rita Price Simpson	Sports broadcasting	2025
Roger Stuckey	Sports broadcasting	2025
Chase Briscoe	Motor sports	2025
Dave Darland	Motor sports	2025
Bill Floyd	Motor sports	2025
Gary Cannon	Multi-sport	2025
Willie Wilder	Multi-sport	2025
Barry Wortham	Multi-sport	2025
Mike Gibson	Sport management	2025
George Avery	Officiating	2025
Charles Barnett	Officiating	2025
Mark Hopper	Officiating	2025
Jay Slater	Officiating	2025
Don Corey	Officiating	2025
James M. Russell	Officiating	2025
Frank J. Mexvescek	Officiating	2025
John Abrams	Sports medicine	2025
Thomas Brady	Sports medicine	2025
H. Robert Brueckmann	Sports medicine	2025
David Craig	Sports medicine	2025
Henry Feuer	Sports medicine	2025
Tim Garl	Sports medicine	2025
Tim Hamby	Sports medicine	2025
Timothy Hupfer	Sports medicine	2025
William Newell	Sports medicine	2025
Steve Olvery	Sports medicine	2025
Ralph Reiff	Sports medicine	2025
Hunter Smith	Sports medicine	2025
Terry Trammel	Sports medicine	2025
Brook Monroe	Swimming	2025
Kent Musall	Swimming	2025
Dan McNally	Tennis	2025
Tim Glyshaw	Thoroughbred racing	2025
Bob Kennedy	Track and field	2025
Kathy Brown	Volleyball	2025
Jean Kesterson	Volleyball	2025
McKenzie Hayes Kohnert	Volleyball	2025
Bob Harmon	Wrestling	2025
Spike Huber	Professional wrestling	2025
Ron Stateler	Wrestling	2025
