= Indiana State Sycamores baseball =

University baseball program

Indiana State Sycamores
- 2026 Indiana State Sycamores baseball team
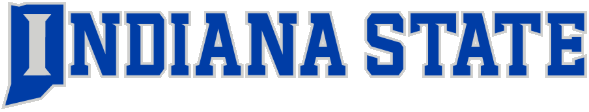
- Founded: 1896; 130 years ago
- University: Indiana State University
- Head coach: Tracy Archuleta (2nd season)
- Conference: Missouri Valley
- Location: Terre Haute, Indiana
- Home stadium: Bob Warn Field at Sycamore Stadium (capacity: 2,000)
- Nickname: Sycamores
- Colors: Royal blue and white

College World Series appearances
- 1986

NCAA regional champions
- 1986, 2023

NCAA tournament appearances
- 1979, 1983, 1984, 1986, 1987, 1989, 1995, 2012, 2014, 2019, 2021, 2023, 2024

Conference tournament champions
- Missouri Valley Conference: 1979, 1983, 1984, 1986; 1989, 1995, 2019, 2023

Conference regular season champions
- Missouri Valley Conference: 1982 (East Division), 1983 (East Division); 1985, 2012, 2023, 2024 Indiana Collegiate Conference: 1957, 1958, 1964, 1966 Indiana Intercollegiate Conference: 1923, 1924, 1930, 1946, 1947, 1949 Indiana College Athletic League: 1919, 1920, 1921

The Indiana State Sycamores baseball team is the NCAA Division I baseball program of Indiana State University, located in Terre Haute, Indiana. It is a member of the Missouri Valley Conference. The team last played in the NCAA Division I Baseball Championship in 2024. Their first season was 1896. The Sycamores have had 12 All-Americans, 26 Major Leaguers, and more than 2,200 victories. The team's most successful season was in 1986, when the team appeared in the College World Series and finished with a record of 48–21. The Sycamores have appeared in the NCAA Division I Baseball Championship in 1979, 1983, 1984, 1987, 1989, 1995, 2012, 2014, 2019, 2021, 2023, and 2024.

They appeared in the NAIA Baseball World Series in 1958 and won the NAIA "Midwest" District Championship in 1964. In 2013, the 1958 team was honored on the 55th Anniversary of their appearance at the NAIA Baseball World Series.

Past coaches include John Wooden, Bob Warn, former ISU and MiLB'er Paul L. Wolf, Wally Marks and Mitch Hannahs. The Sycamores play their home games at Sycamore Stadium at Bob Warn Field (900).

== Division I NCAA tournament results ==
The Sycamores have appeared in 13 NCAA Division I Baseball Championships. Their combined record is 16–26; they won the 1986 Mideast Regional and the 2023 Terre Haute Regional; they reached Regional Finals in 1989, 2019 and 2024.

Year	Result	Games
1979	Midwest Regional	0–2
1983	Mideast Regional	0–2
1984	Mideast Regional	1–2
1986	Mideast Regional	3–0
1986	College World Series	0–2
1987	Central Regional	1–2
1989	South Regional	2–2
1995	Midwest II Regional	1–2
2012	Eugene Regional	0–2
2014	Bloomington Regional	0–2
2019	Nashville Regional	2–2
2021	Nashville Regional	1–2
2023	Terre Haute Regional	3–0
2023	Fort Worth Super Regional	0–2
2024	Lexington Regional	2–2

== National awards (2) ==
Year	Player	Organization
2010	Ryan Strausborger, CF	Rawlings Gold Glove
2023	Grant Magill, C	Rawlings Gold Glove

== All-Americans (17) ==
Year	Player	Organization
1963	Harlan Lautenschlager, IF	NAIA
1985	John Howes, P	Baseball America
1979	Wallace Johnson, 2B	CoSIDA NCAA Post-Graduate Scholarship
1981	Marty Martino, 2B	CoSIDA Academic All-American
1986	Paul Frye, OF	Collegiate Baseball
1989	Mitch Hannahs, 2B	ABCA, Baseball America
1990	Chad McDonald, 3B	ABCA, Collegiate Baseball
1991	Mike Farrell, P/1B	Collegiate Baseball
1992	John LaMar, OF	ABCA, Baseball America, Collegiate Baseball
1993	Casey Whitten, P	ABCA, Baseball America, Collegiate Baseball
1995	Todd Tatlock, DH	ABCA, Collegiate Baseball, NCBWA
1996	Dan Olson, OF	ABCA, NCBWA
2014	Ryan Keaffaber, SP	Louisville Slugger
2016	Tyler Ward, SP	Louisville Slugger
2021	Geremy Guerrero, SP	ABCA, Baseball America, Collegiate Baseball, D1Baseball.com, NCBWA
2022	Randal Diaz, 3B	Collegiate Baseball
2023	Connor Fenlong, SP	ABCA, Collegiate Baseball, D1Baseball.com, NCBWA

== Most Valuable Player ==
=== Conference (reg. season) ===
- 2012 Jeremy Lucas, C Missouri Valley Conference
- 2023 Connor Fenlong, RHP Missouri Valley Conference
- 2023 Grant Magill, C Missouri Valley Conference

=== Conference Tournament (6) ===
- 1979 Wallace Johnson, 2B Missouri Valley Conference
- 1986 Dave Travis, DH Missouri Valley Conference
- 1989 Larry Russell, OF Missouri Valley Conference
- 1995 Jeff Leaman, 3B/P Missouri Valley Conference
- 2019 Chris Ayers, OF/DH Missouri Valley Conference
- 2023 Randal Diaz, IF Missouri Valley Conference

== All-Conference (113) ==
Only players selected for the conference first team are displayed; for second team and honorable mention, please consult the Indiana State baseball media guide at www.gosycamores.com

=== All-Indiana Collegiate Conference (35) ===
- Henry Smith, (P) – 1954
- Henry Smith, (P) – 1955
- Henry Smith, (P) – 1957
- Parker Eaton, (P) – 1958
- Gerald Jeffries, (2B) – 1958
- Paul Edgerton, (C) – 1958
- Bill Gilkey, (OF) – 1958
- Jim Bates, (OF) – 1958
- Joe Decker, (SS) – 1962
- Gary Cunning, (C) – 1962
- Paul Gries, (SS) – 1965

- Larry Roesch, (2B) - 1965
- Mike Harlan, (OF) – 1965
- Randy Miller, (OF) – 1965
- Paul Edgerton, (C) – 1965
- Randy Miller, (OF) – 1966
- Drew Thomas, (P) – 1966
- Robert Warren, (P) – 1966
- Alan Buell, (1B) – 1966
- John Smith, (SS) – 1966
- Mike Phillips, (3B) – 1966
- Mike Harlan, (OF) – 1966
- Steve Hollenbeck, C – 1966

- Drew Thomas, (P) – 1967
- Alan Buell, (1B) – 1967
- Randy Miller, (2B)
- Mike Harlan, (OF) – 1967
- Mike Phillips, (3B) – 1967
- Mike Lecklitner, (OF) – 1967
- Steve Hollenbeck, (3B) – 1968
- Dave Lecklitner, (C) – 1968
- Nick Petrycki, (SS) – 1968
- Mike Russell, (OF) – 1968
- Drew Thomas, (P) – 1968
- Mike Phillips, (1B) – 1968

=== All-Missouri Valley Conference (87) ===
- Bill Hayes, (C) – 1977
- Jay James, (3B) – 1977
- Jeff Brisson, (OF) – 1977
- Bill Hayes, (C) – 1978
- Greg Baker, (OF) – 1978
- Preston Williams, (1B) – 1979
- Wallace Johnson, (2B) – 1979
- Pete Piskol, (SS) – 1979
- Greg Baker, (OF) – 1979
- Mark Walberg, (P) – 1979
- Pete Piskol, (SS) – 1979
- Pat Dumochelle, (C) – 1980
- Dave Browning, (DH) – 1980

- Zane Smith, (P) – 1982
- Pete Piskol, (SS) – 1982
- Mark Walberg, (OF) – 1982
- Rob Baker, (OF) – 1983
- Brian Dorsett, (C) – 1983
- Rod Zeratsky, (DH) – 1983
- Tim Barrett, (P) – 1983
- Mike Coin, (1B) – 1984
- Scott Mann, (OF) – 1984
- Rod Zeratsky, (C) – 1984
- Tony Collins, (DH) – 1984
- Blaise Ilsley, (P) – 1984
- Boi Rodriguez, (3B) – 1985

- Bob Zeihen, (OF) – 1985
- Tony Collins, (DH) – 1985
- Blaise Ilsley, (P) – 1985
- Boi Rodriguez, (3B) – 1986
- Paul Frye, (OF) – 1986
- Mike Eberle, (C) – 1986
- Mitch Hannahs, (2B) – 1987
- Dan Roman, (SS) – 1987
- Mike Eberle, (C) – 1987
- Jamie Allison, (OF) – 1987
- Mitch Hannahs, (Util) – 1988
- Mitch Hannahs, (2B) – 1989
- Chad McDonald, (3B) – 1989

- Kurt Olson, (UT) – 1989
- Mike Farrell, (DH) – 1990
- Dave Doster, (2B) – 1992
- Steve Ruckman, (3B) – 1992
- John LaMar, (OF) – 1992
- Stoney Burke, (C) – 1993
- Demetrius Dowler, (OF) – 1993
- Casey Whitten, (P) – 1993
- Ric Johnson, (OF) – 1994
- Jeff Leaman, (UT) – 1995
- Todd Tatlock, (DH) – 1995
- Ric Johnson, (OF) – 1995
- Brad Finken, (P) – 1996

- Dan Olson, (OF) – 1996
- Rick Angell, (OF) – 1998
- Tony Harden, (P) – 1998
- Pete Hennecke, (IF) – 1998
- Clint Barmes, (SS) – 2000
- Mitch Stetter, (P) – 2000
- Jason Frome, (OF) – 2001
- Nevin Ashley, (C) – 2006
- Ryan Strausborger, 2B – 2008
- Ryan Strausborger, UT – 2009
- Brady Shoemaker, OF – 2009
- Nick Ciolli, OF – 2009
- Joe Rodriguez, (SP) – 2009

- Ryan Strausborger, (OF) – 2010
- Jacob Petricka, (SP) – 2010
- Robby Ort, (OF) – 2011
- Jeremy Lucas, (C) – 2012
- Rob Ort, (OF) – 2012
- Dakota Bacus, (SP) – 2012
- Ryan Keaffaber, (RP) – 2014
- Tyler Wampler, (SS) – 2014
- Andy DeJesus, (2B) – 2016
- Hunter Owen, (OF) – 2016
- Tony Rosselli, (OF) – 2017
- Jake Means, (3B) – 2018
- Tyler Grauer, (LHP) – 2019

- Collin Liberatore, (RHP) – 2019
- Jake Means, (3B) – 2019
- Aaron Beck, (OF) – 2021
- Connor Fenlong, (RP) – 2021
- Geremy Guerrero, (SP) – 2021
- Jordan Schaeffer, (SS) – 2021
- Max Wright, (C) – 2021
- Lane Miller, (SP) - 2023
- Matt Jachec, (SP) - 2023

=== Conference specialty (12) ===
==== Pitcher of the Year (2) ====
- Geremy Guerrero – 2021
- Connor Fenlong – 2023

==== Defensive Player of the Year (3) ====
- Tyler Wampler – 2014
- Jake Means – 2019
- Grant Magill – 2023

==== MVC Newcomer of the Year (5) ====
- Rich Angell – 1998
- Clint Barmes – 2000
- Tim Brewer – 2005
- Collin Liberatore – 2019
- Aaron Beck – 2021

==== MVC Freshman of the Year (2) ====
- Mitch Stetter – 2000
- Ryan Keaffaber – 2014

== Career leaders ==
=== Batting average ===
Name	Average
Larry Bird* (1979)	.500
Todd Tatlock (1994–95)	.423
Wallace Johnson (1977–79)	.422
Rob Barker (1981–83)	.399
Pete Piskol (1978–82)	.396
Paul Frye (1984–86)	.383

- Bird appeared in one game for the baseball team, going 1-for-2 with 2 RBI.

=== Hits ===
Name	Hits
Bob Zeihen* (1985–88)	290
Mitch Hannahs (1986–89)	274
Steve Ruckman (1990–93)	257
Dan Roman (1984–87)	253
Pete Piskol (1978–82)	250

- Bob Zeihen holds the National NCAA career record for triples (32)

=== HRs ===
Name	HRs
Boi Rodriguez (1985–87)	48
Dan Frye (1989–92)	39
Mike Eberle (1984–87)	37
Tyler Thompson (1995–98)	32
Dan Olson (1994–96)	30

=== Wins ===
Name	Wins
Mike Gardiner (1984–87)	30
John Howes (1982–86)	29
Mike Farrell (1988–91)	27
Casey Whitten (1991–93)	27
Paul Quizner (1983–86)	25
Blaine Ilsley (1983–85)	25
Randy Keaffaber (1990–93)	25
Brad Finken (1994–97)	25

=== ERA ===
Name	ERA
Jim Ridenour (1977–78)	3.03
Casey Whitten (1991–93)	3.04
Dave Thomas (1977–78)	3.09
Blaise Ilsley (1983–85)	3.20
Jim Rasmussen (1977–78)	3.32

=== Strikeouts ===
Name	Strikeouts
Casey Whitten (1991–93)	299
Mike Gardiner (1983–86)	296
Brad Finken (1994–97)	275
Blake Ilsley (1983–85)	274
Mitch Stetter (2000–03)	254

== Sycamores in MLB ==
While long-time baseball great Tommy John is an alumnus of Indiana State; he did not play baseball for the Sycamores as he attended classes around his professional baseball schedule. Future New York Yankees-great, Don Mattingly, declined his baseball scholarship from Coach Bob Warn after he was drafted by the New York Yankees.

Bill Hayes had 2 "cups-of-coffee" in the majors but would go on to a long career as a minor league manager before beginning a 15-year coaching career with the San Francisco Giants, winning 3 World Series Championships (2010, 2012, 2014); in December 2014, he was named first base coach for the Giants. Long-time college basketball coach Ron Felling was a 2-year letterman for the Sycamores.

In addition, basketball legend Larry Bird appeared in two games for the Sycamores, in the spring of 1979, following the NCAA men's basketball tournament.

Indiana State has placed over 75 Sycamores in the minors, of which 27 have reached the major leagues or Negro major leagues. They are by order of appearance:

#	Player	Primary Team	Career
1	Junius Bibbs	Kansas City Monarchs	1933–1944
2	Jeff James	Philadelphia Phillies	1968–1969
3	Danny Lazar	Chicago White Sox	1968–1968
4	Bill Hayes	Chicago Cubs	1980–1981
5	Wallace Johnson	Montreal Expos	1981–1990
6	Rick Grapenthin	Montreal Expos	1983–1985
7	Zane Smith	Atlanta Braves	1984–1996
8	Brian Dorsett	Cincinnati Reds	1984–1996
9	Tim Barrett	Montreal Expos	1988
10	Mike Gardiner	Boston Red Sox	1990–1995
11	Tom Gilles	Toronto Blue Jays	1990–1990
12	Blaise Ilsley	Chicago Cubs	1994–1994
13	David Doster	Philadelphia Phillies	1996, 1999
14	Chuck Smith	Florida Marlins	2000–2001
15	Clint Barmes	Colorado Rockies	2003–2015
16	Alex Graman	New York Yankees	2003–2004
17	Mitch Stetter	Milwaukee Brewers	2007–2011
18	Joe Thatcher	San Diego Padres	2007–2015
19	Brian Omogrosso	Chicago White Sox	2012–2013
20	Jake Petricka	Chicago White Sox	2013–2021
21	Colin Rea	Milwaukee Brewers	2015–present
22	Ryan Strausborger	Texas Rangers	2015
23	Nevin Ashley	Milwaukee Brewers	2015
24	Sean Manaea	Oakland A's	2016–present
25	Andy Young	Arizona Diamondbacks	2020–2021
26	Dakota Bacus	Washington Nationals	2020
27	Hunter Owen	Pittsburgh Pirates	2021

=== Major League Baseball All-Stars ===
Year	Name	Position	Team	Notes
1937	Junius “Rainey” Bibbs	INF	Cincinnati Tigers	
1968	Tommy John	SP	Chicago White Sox	
1978	Tommy John	SP	Los Angeles Dodgers	
1979	Tommy John	SP	New York Yankees	
1980	Tommy John	SP	New York Yankees	

== Coaching leaders ==
Years	Coach (Alma Mater)	Wins	Losses	Ties	Pct.	Notes
1976–2006	Bob Warn (Southern Illinois)	1,070	745	5	.598	1986 College World Series, 7 NCAA bids, 1979, 1983, 1984, 1986, 1989, 1995 Conference Titles
2014–2024	Mitch Hannahs (Indiana State)	355	214	1	.624	5 NCAA bids; 2023, 2024 Conference Titles
1938–1941, 1956–1967	Paul Wolf (Indiana State)	140	113	5	.552	1958 NAIA World Series, 4-time Coach of the Year, 1957, 1958, 1964, 1966 Conference Titles
2010–2013	Rick Heller (Upper Iowa)	132	96	0	.583	2012 NCAA tournament, 2012 MVC Coach of the Year
1968–1975	Jim Rendel (Earlham, {Ind.})	129	141	0	.478	
1929–1931, 1934–1937, 1942, 1946–1947, 1949–1955	Wally Marks (Chicago)	108	81	2	.571	1930, 1946, 1948, 1949 Conference Titles
2007–2009	Lindsay Meggs (UCLA)	77	79	0	.493	2009 Coach of the Year
2025-pres	Tracy Archuleta (Metro State)	54	56	0	.491	
1924–1928	Art Strum (Wisconsin-LaCrosse)	41	16	0	.719	1924 Conference Title
1918–1923	Birch Bayh (Indiana State)	40	13	1	.750	1919, 1920, 1921, 1923 Conference Titles
1913–1917	Alfred Westphal (unknown)	24	24	1	.500	
1932–1933	Jack Hannah (unknown)	18	8	0	.692	
1948	John Wooden (Purdue), (Indiana State)*	7	7	0	.500	
1912	Bert Wiggins (unknown)	8	2	0	.800	
1910	Jesse A. Wood (Indiana State)	7	4	0	.636	
1896–1909; 1911; 1918; 1944	Others	50	59	0	.460	
1896–present	All-time	2,260	1,658	15	.577	

- - John Wooden was a graduate student while he coached the baseball team

=== Coaching honors ===
==== Conference Coach of the Year (10) ====
Coach	Year(s)	Conf
Paul Wolf	1958, 1963, 1966, 1967	Indiana Collegiate
Bob Warn	1979, 1983, 1984	Missouri Valley
Lindsay Meggs	2009	Missouri Valley
Rick Heller	2012	Missouri Valley
Mitch Hannahs	2023	Missouri Valley

== Hall(s) of Fame ==
- 1985 - Wallace Johnson (player) - Indiana State University Hall of Fame
- 1987 – Paul Wolf (coach) – Indiana Baseball Hall of Fame
- 1988 – Don Jennings (player) – Indiana Baseball Hall of Fame
- 1989 – Howard Sharpe (player) – Indiana Baseball Hall of Fame
- 1990 – Bob Warn (coach) – Indiana Baseball Hall of Fame
- 2000 – Bob Warn (coach) – Iowa Western Hall of Fame
- 2002 - Junius "Rainey" Bibbs (player) - Indiana State University Hall of Fame
- 2002 – 1986 Baseball Team (team) – Indiana State University Hall of Fame
- 2002 – Bob Warn (coach) – Indiana State University Hall of Fame
- 2002 – Paul Gries (player) – Indiana Baseball Hall of Fame
- 2003 – Bob Warn (coach) – American Baseball Coach's Association
- 2007 – Brian Dorsett (player) – Indiana State University Hall of Fame
- 2008 – Brian Dorsett (player) – Indiana Baseball Hall of Fame
- 2011 – Junius "Rainey" Bibbs (player) – Indiana Baseball Hall of Fame
- 2014 - Lou Giovanini (coach) – Indiana Baseball Hall of Fame
- 2020 - Clint Barmes (player) – Indiana Baseball Hall of Fame
- 2021 - Sean Manaea (player) – Indiana State University Hall of Fame
- 2022 - Steve Ruckman (player) - Frontier League Hall of Fame

== See also ==
- List of NCAA Division I baseball programs
