= Bill Hayes (baseball) =

American baseball player (born 1957)

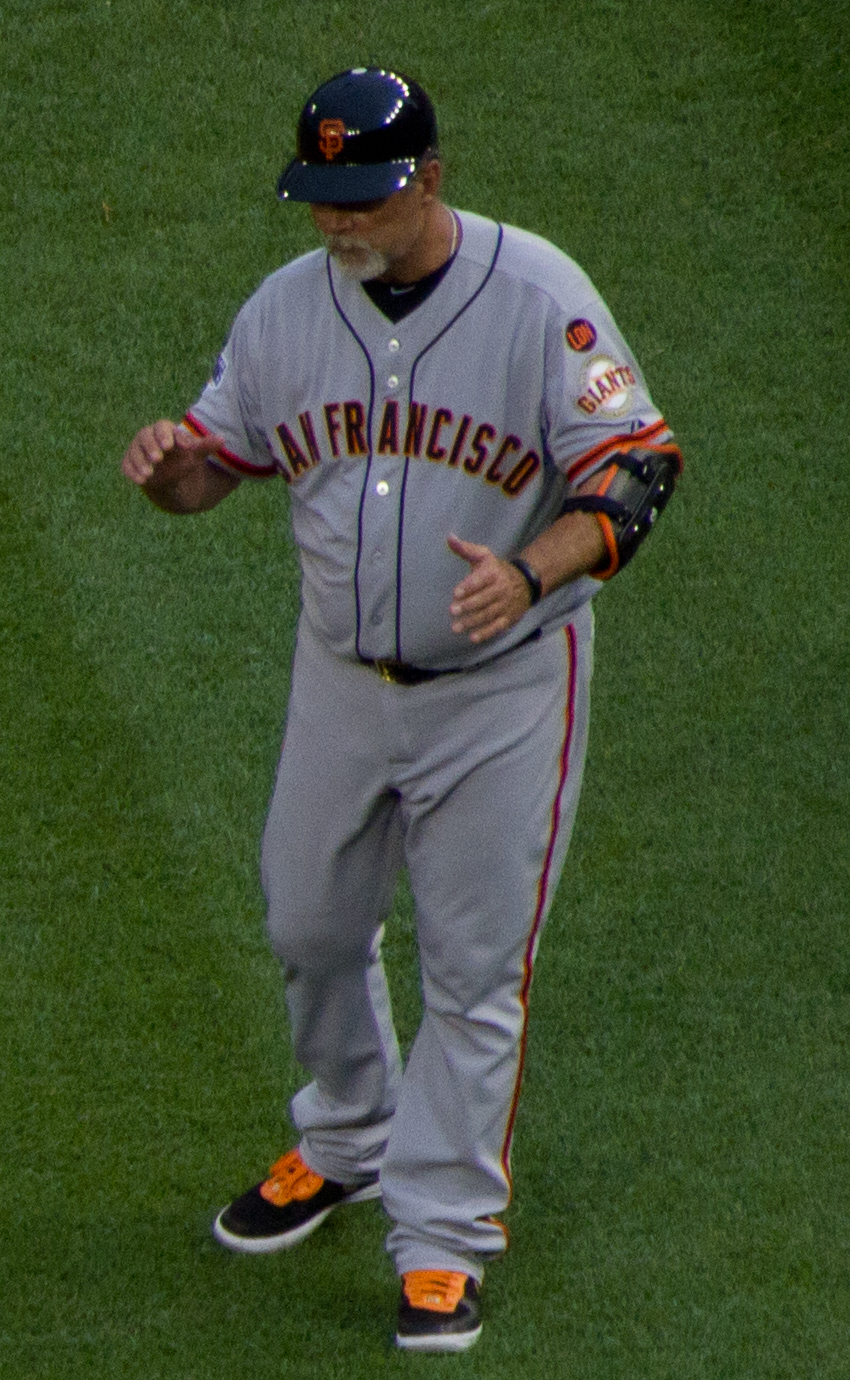
- Hayes as a first base coach of the San Francisco Giants in 2015
- Catcher
- Born: October 24, 1957 (age 68); Cheverly, Maryland, U.S.
- Batted: Right Threw: Right

MLB debut
- September 30, 1980, for the Chicago Cubs

Last MLB appearance
- September 3, 1981, for the Chicago Cubs

MLB statistics
- Batting average: .222
- Home runs: 0
- Runs batted in: 0
- Stats at Baseball Reference

Teams
- As player: Chicago Cubs (1980–1981); As coach: Colorado Rockies (1998); San Francisco Giants (2003–2016)

Career highlights and awards
- 3× World Series champion (2010, 2012, 2014)

William Ernest Hayes (born October 24, 1957), nicknamed "Wild Bill", is an American former catcher for the Chicago Cubs (1980–81). After his playing career he became a coach for the San Francisco Giants.

== Early life ==
Born in Cheverly, Maryland, Hayes grew up in North Platte, Nebraska and graduated from St. Patrick High School.

== College career ==
Hayes caught the eye of coach Bob Warn at Iowa Western Community College and was offered a scholarship at Indiana State when Warn took the head coaching position there in 1976. Hayes played three seasons at Indiana State (1976–78).

In 1978, his junior season at Indiana State, Hayes was an all-conference player and led the team with 13 home runs. He batted .317 with 48 RBI (in 53 games) and threw out 18 of 21 runners attempting to steal.

== Professional career ==
=== Draft and minor leagues ===
Hayes was the Cubs' first-round draft selection and the 13th overall pick in 1978.

=== Chicago Cubs (1980–1981) ===
In two years in the majors, he played in five games and had nine at-bats, two hits, one double, .222 batting average, .222 on-base percentage, .333 slugging percentage, and 3 total bases.

== Coaching career ==
Hayes coached and managed in the minor leagues in 1988–97 and 1999–2002, with a one-year stint as bullpen coach for the Colorado Rockies in 1998. In the minors, he managed the Geneva Cubs (1988–90), winning a Division Championship in 1990, Peoria Chiefs (1991), Winston-Salem Spirits (1992), and Daytona Cubs (1993) in the Cubs organization. He then moved to the Rockies organization, managing the Central Valley Rockies (1994), Salem Avalanche (1995), New Haven Ravens (1996–97), and Colorado Springs Sky Sox (1999). In the Giants organization, he managed the Shreveport Captains (2000), Hagerstown Suns (2001), and San Jose Giants (2002).

Hayes served as the bullpen catcher for the San Francisco Giants from 2003 to 2014, winning three World Series Championships (2010, 2012, 2014). In December 2014, he was promoted to first base coach for the 2015 season. He was removed as first base coach by the Giants after the 2016 season, but remained on the staff in a non-coaching role. After serving as the Giants' minor league catching coordinator in 2018, Hayes returned as manager of the San Jose Giants in 2019, but resigned mid-season.

== Personal life ==
Hayes has two daughters, Kirstyn and Megan, as well as a daughter, Savannah, born in 2016.
