= Bob Warn =

Biographical details
- Born: July 31, 1945 (age 81); Crystal Lake, Illinois, U.S.
- Education: Southern Illinois

Playing career
- 1966–1967: Iowa Western
- 1968: Southern Illinois

Coaching career (HC unless noted)
- 1972: Western Illinois (JV)
- 1973–1975: Iowa Western
- 1976–2006: Indiana State

Head coaching record
- Overall: 1,174–779–9 (.601)

Accomplishments and honors

Championships
- NCAA Mideast Regional (1986); MVC (1979, 1983, 1984, 1986, 1989, 1995)

Awards
- Missouri Valley Conference Coach of the Year (1979, 1983, 1984)

Bob Warn (born July 31, 1945) is a former college baseball coach and player. He is known for his tenure as the head baseball coach at Indiana State, where he led the Sycamores to six Missouri Valley Conference championships, seven NCAA baseball tournament appearances, and a College World Series appearance in 1986 while compiling a record of 1,079-745-9 (.591). In 2000, he was inducted into the Indiana Baseball Hall of Fame. In 2009, the Indiana State Sycamores baseball field was named Bob Warn Field in his honor.

Seventeen of Warn's players went on to play in the major leagues, including Zane Smith, Wallace Johnson, Clint Barmes, Mitch Stetter and Joe Thatcher. He was named Missouri Valley Conference Coach of the Year three times, in 1979, 1983, and 1984.

Warn's Indiana State teams featured 16 All-Americans and 60 First-team All-Conference players, while his Iowa Western teams placed two players on the junior college baseball All-American rolls.

== Head coaching record ==
Record table
Season	Team	Overall	Conference	Standing	Postseason
Iowa Western Reivers (ICCAC) (1973–1975)
1973	Iowa Western				
1974	Iowa Western				
1975	Iowa Western	42-10		4th	JUCO World Series
Iowa Western:		104–38			
Indiana State Sycamores (Independent) (1976)
1976	Indiana State	25–23			
Indiana State Sycamores (Missouri Valley Conference) (1977–2006)
1977	Indiana State	34–21	1–2	3rd	Missouri Valley Tournament
1978	Indiana State	26-24-3	2–0	4th	Missouri Valley Tournament
1979	Indiana State	41–11	5–0	2nd	Midwestern Regional
1980	Indiana State	38–19	4–0	3rd	Missouri Valley Tournament
1981	Indiana State	34–26	4–8	3rd (East)	
1982	Indiana State	40–20	12–4	1st (East)	Missouri Valley Tournament
1983	Indiana State	37–14–1	7–1	1st (East)	Mideast Regional
1984	Indiana State	36–23–1	7–6	3rd	Mideast Regional
1985	Indiana State	57–22	5–15	T–1st	Missouri Valley Tournament
1986	Indiana State	48–21	10–10	4th	College World Series
1987	Indiana State	45–18–1	10–10	T-3rd	Central Regional
1988	Indiana State	31–28	6–14	6th	Missouri Valley Tournament
1989	Indiana State	48–21–1	13–7	2nd	South Regional
1990	Indiana State	43–21	8–12	4th	Missouri Valley Tournament
1991	Indiana State	42–23	15–9	3rd	Missouri Valley Tournament
1992	Indiana State	40–19	13–8	3rd	Missouri Valley Tournament
1993	Indiana State	35–23	12–9	4th	Missouri Valley Tournament
1994	Indiana State	28–28	5–16	T-7th	
1995	Indiana State	39–23	16–15	5th	Midwest II Regional
1996	Indiana State	22–31	10–19	8th	
1997	Indiana State	24–30	9–23	9th	
1998	Indiana State	37–18–1	23–9	2nd	Missouri Valley Tournament
1999	Indiana State	21–34	8–24	9th	
2000	Indiana State	31–28-1	16–16	4th	Missouri Valley Tournament
2001	Indiana State	32–28	15–16	6th	Missouri Valley Tournament
2002	Indiana State	30–27	16–15	5th	Missouri Valley Tournament
2003	Indiana State	36–22	15–17	5th	Missouri Valley Tournament
2004	Indiana State	20–37	12–20	6th	Missouri Valley Tournament
2005	Indiana State	30–28	10–14	6th	Missouri Valley Tournament
2006	Indiana State	20–33	5–19	8th	
Indiana State:		1,070–741–9 (.590)	294–338 (.465)		
Total:		1,174–779–9 (.601)			
National champion Postseason invitational champion Conference regular season champion Conference regular season and conference tournament champion Division regular season champion Division regular season and conference tournament champion Conference tournament champion
