= Will Inman =

Will Inman may refer to:

- Will Inman (baseball)
- Will Inman (poet)

== See also ==
- William Inman, owner of the Liverpool, New York and Philadelphia Steamship Company
