= Vicki Hall =

American basketball player and coach (born 1969)

Personal information
- Born: October 3, 1969 (age 57) Indianapolis, Indiana, U.S.
- Listed height: 6 ft 1 in (1.85 m)
- Listed weight: 180 lb (82 kg)
- Position: Assistant coach

Career highlights
- Naismith Prep Player of the Year (1988); Gatorade National Player of the Year (1988); Indiana Miss Basketball (1988)
- Stats at WNBA.com
- Stats at Basketball Reference
Medals
Women's basketball
Representing the United States
FIBA Under-18 Americas Championship
Gold medal – first place	1988 Brazil	Team

Vicki Anne Hall (born October 3, 1969) is an assistant coach with the Indiana Fever since 2021. Before joining the WNBA team, Hall served as the head coach of the Indiana State Sycamores women's basketball team from 2018 to 2021. As a basketball player, Hall accumulated 1,755 points with Brebeuf High School. She was the 1988 Naismith Prep Player of the Year and Gatorade High School Basketball Player of the Year. With the Texas Longhorns women's basketball team from 1988 to 1993, Hall reached the final eight of the NCAA Division I women's basketball tournament between 1989 and 1990 and had 1,831 career points. Apart from college basketball, Hall won gold at the 1990 FIBA World Championship for Women and the 1990 Goodwill Games with the American women basketball team.

For her professional basketball career in the United States, Hall played in the American Basketball League during the late 1990s before joining the Women's National Basketball Association in 2000. With the Cleveland Rockers, Indiana Fever and the Los Angeles Sparks, Hall played in a combined total of 61 games up to 2002 and had 255 points. For her international career, Hall had 1,958 points for several Italian teams in the Lega Basket Femminile during the 2000s. In between her stints in Italy, Hall had 155 points in the 2006–07 EuroLeague Women in France. Other countries where Hall played basketball included Greece, Israel and Turkey. Hall was inducted into the Indiana Basketball Hall of Fame in 2013 and the Indiana Sports Hall of Fame during 2023.

== Early life and education ==
On October 3, 1969, Hall was born in Indianapolis, Indiana. During her childhood, Hall began playing basketball by herself as a toddler. In elementary school, Hall was on a basketball team while participating in athletics and softball. As a teenager, Hall played at the 1984 AAU Junior Olympic Games in the girls basketball event. In later editions, she won the 16U event with Love's Carpet during 1986 and the 18U event with the Indiana Hoosierettes during 1988.

At Brebeuf High School from 1984 to 1988, Hall accumulated 925 rebounds and 1725 points. With the team, Hall competed in the 1988 Warren Central regional final held by the IHSAA. On the American women's team, Hall won silver at the 1986 U.S. Olympic Festival and gold at the 1987 William Jones Cup. In 1988, she won another gold medal at the FIBA Americas Under-18 Championship for Women. That year, she participated at the Olympic trials and did not receive a spot on the American team.

During 1986, Hall was an Associated Press All-State player. She continued to be an All-State player during 1987 and 1988. Hall was named an All-American by Parade in 1986 and 1987. In 1988, she was their Player of the Year. That year, Hall was a Converse All-American.

== College basketball ==
In 1988, Hall joined the women's basketball team while attending the University of Texas at Austin. That year, she had an injured foot due to a stress fracture. Due to her injury, "Hall missed eight games" that season. In 1989, Hall won the Southwest Conference women's basketball tournament with Texas. At that year's NCAA Division I women's basketball tournament, her team reached the regional finals.

With Texas during 1990, Hall won the Southwest Conference tournament. They were also regional finalists at the NCAA Division I tournament. In school records from 1990 to 1993, Hall had the most points in two seasons and most rebounds in three seasons. In 2022, Hall was in the top ten for most overall defensive rebounds and points.

Apart from college basketball, Hall was on the American team that played at the 1989 FIBA Americas Championship for Women. She also won gold with the American women's basketball team at the 1990 FIBA World Championship for Women and the 1990 Goodwill Games. For her post-secondary education, Hall studied psychology at Texas and graduated in 1993 with a bachelor's degree.

== Career ==
=== Professional career ===
As a European basketball player between 1993 and 1996, Hall started out in Switzerland before she primarily played in Greece. In 1996, Hall remained in Greece after declining to be drafted by the Colorado Xplosion. The following year, Hall left Greece to play for the Xplosion in the American Basketball League. In 1998, Hall stayed in the ABL when she was drafted by the Nashville Noise. After Hall played with the Noise until the ABL closed in December 1998, she resumed her Greek basketball career in 1999.

In the Women's National Basketball Association, Hall started her first games with the Cleveland Rockers between May and June 2000. After experiencing a back injury in July 2001, Hall was released by the Rockers and started playing for the Indiana Fever that month. In May 2002, Hall played for the Los Angeles Sparks during their preseason. After 3 games with the Sparks, Hall ended her WNBA career with 255 points, 140 rebounds and 61 games during her time with the three teams.

Outside of the WNBA, Hall played basketball in Israel and Turkey (1999-2000 for Brisaspor and 2001-2002 for Fenerbahçe Istanbul) during the early 2000s. From 2003 to 2006, Hall played on multiple Italian teams in the Lega Basket Femminile. While in Italy, Hall and her team were part of the final four in 2006. Hall went to France for the 2006–07 EuroLeague Women season where she had 77 rebounds and 155 points. Hall returned to the Lega Basket Femminile in 2007 and remained with the league until 2008. With the LBF, Hall scored 1,958 overall points between four teams.

=== Coaching career ===
Between 2002 and 2003, Hall coached in Israel as the interim women's basketball head coach for Bank Leumi. After ending her playing career in 2009, Hall became an assistant coach for Miami University in Oxford, Ohio. She remained at Miami until she continued her assistant coaching career with the University of New Mexico's women's basketball team in 2011. After transferring to the University of Toledo in 2012, Hall worked as an associate head coach for their women's basketball team from 2012 to 2017.

In March 2018, Hall became the head coach of the Indiana State Sycamores women's basketball team. At the Missouri Valley Conference women's basketball tournament, Hall's team was in the first round during 2019. Indiana State also competed in the tournament's first round during 2021. After leaving Indiana State in March 2021, Hall had 21 wins and 59 losses. The following month, Hall was hired by the Indiana Fever as an assistant coach.

== Honors ==
In 1988, Hall was named Indiana Miss Basketball. That year, she was also the recipient of the Naismith Prep Player of the Year Award and Gatorade High School Basketball Player of the Year Award. During 1989, Hall was on The Associated Press's Indiana Players of the '80s list. In 1990, Hall was in the top ten for the most points scored by a girls basketball player in Indiana.

For the Southwest Conference, Hall was their Newcomer of the Year for 1989. During 1990, she was named All-Southwest Conference. Additional All-Southwest selections for Hall were in 1991 and 1993. With the University of Texas, Hall was named Most Valuable Player on the women's basketball team in 1990. In 2013, Hall was named to the Silver Anniversary Team by the Indiana Basketball Hall of Fame. Years later, she was inducted into the Indiana Basketball Hall of Fame in 2015. In 2018, Hall was inducted into the University of Texas at Austin Hall of Honor. She joined the Indiana Sports Hall of Fame during 2023.
