= Scott Linebrink =

American baseball player (born 1976)

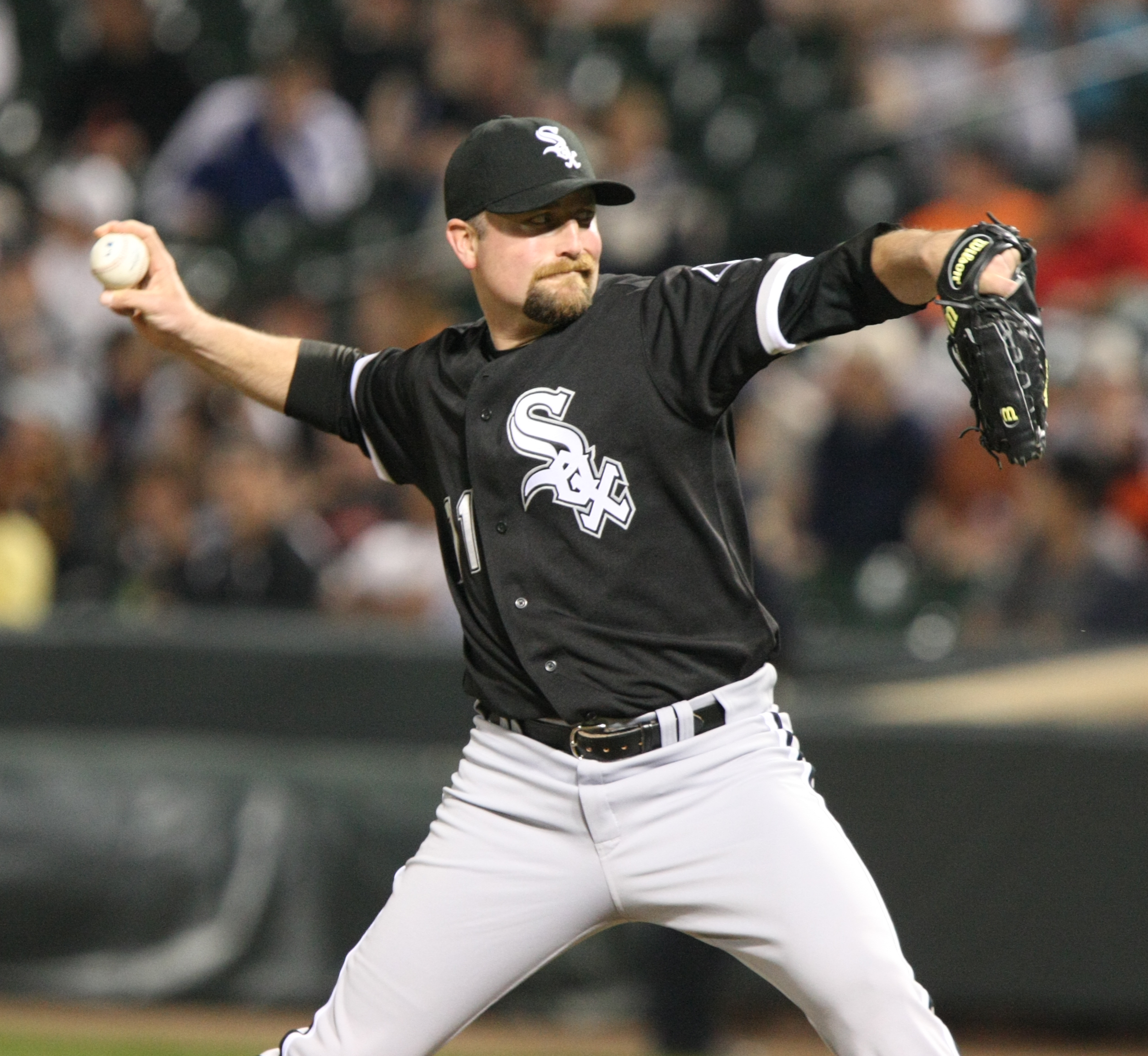
- Linebrink with the Chicago White Sox in 2010
- Pitcher
- Born: August 4, 1976 (age 49); Austin, Texas, U.S.
- Batted: Right Threw: Right

MLB debut
- April 15, 2000, for the San Francisco Giants

Last MLB appearance
- September 28, 2011, for the Atlanta Braves

MLB statistics
- Win–loss record: 42–31
- Earned run average: 3.51
- Strikeouts: 567
- Stats at Baseball Reference

Teams
- San Francisco Giants (2000); Houston Astros (2000–2003); San Diego Padres (2003–2007); Milwaukee Brewers (2007); Chicago White Sox (2008–2010); Atlanta Braves (2011)

Scott Cameron Linebrink (born August 4, 1976) is an American former professional baseball pitcher. He played in Major League Baseball (MLB) for the San Francisco Giants, Houston Astros, San Diego Padres, Milwaukee Brewers, Chicago White Sox, and Atlanta Braves. He attended Texas State University before getting drafted, but finished his degree after his retirement at Concordia University (Texas) in Austin.

== Career ==
=== San Francisco Giants ===
Linebrink was drafted by the San Francisco Giants in the second round (56th overall) of the 1997 Major League Baseball draft. He made his major league debut with the Giants on April 15, 2000, allowing two hits in a scoreless inning against the Arizona Diamondbacks.

=== Houston Astros ===
On July 30, 2000, Linebrink was traded to the Houston Astros for Doug Henry. He went on to split the next few seasons between the Astros and the minor leagues. On May 24, 2003, Linebrink was designated for assignment. In nine games (six starts) with the Astros in 2003, he was 1–1 with a 4.26 ERA.

=== San Diego Padres ===
On May 30, 2003, Linebrink was claimed off waivers by the San Diego Padres. In 2004, he went 7–3 with a 2.14 ERA in 73 relief appearances. In 2005, Linebrink was 8–1 with one save and a 1.83 ERA in 73 games.

=== Milwaukee Brewers ===
On July 25, 2007, Linebrink was traded to the Milwaukee Brewers for Steve Garrison, Will Inman and Joe Thatcher. He finished the 2007 season with a 5–6 record, one save, and a 3.71 ERA in 71 combined appearances between San Diego and Milwaukee. While with Milwaukee, Linebrink began wearing the number 71 in honor of Mark Merila, former bullpen catcher for the Padres, who had battled a brain tumor. After the season, Linebrink became a free agent.

=== Chicago White Sox ===
In November 2007, Linebrink agreed to a four-year, $19 million contract with the Chicago White Sox.

=== Atlanta Braves ===
On December 3, 2010, Linebrink was traded to the Atlanta Braves for minor league pitcher Kyle Cofield. On August 1, 2011, Linebrink was placed on the 15-day disabled list with a lower back strain. In 64 games with the Braves, he finished 4–4 with one save and a 3.64 ERA.

=== St. Louis Cardinals ===
On February 10, 2012, Linebrink signed a minor league deal with the St. Louis Cardinals, with an invitation to spring training.

He was given his unconditional release on June 8, 2012, after injuries prevented him from pitching with the team.

Currently, Linebrink works as the Director of Stewardship – Southwest Region for Water Mission.
