= Ryan Strausborger =

American baseball player

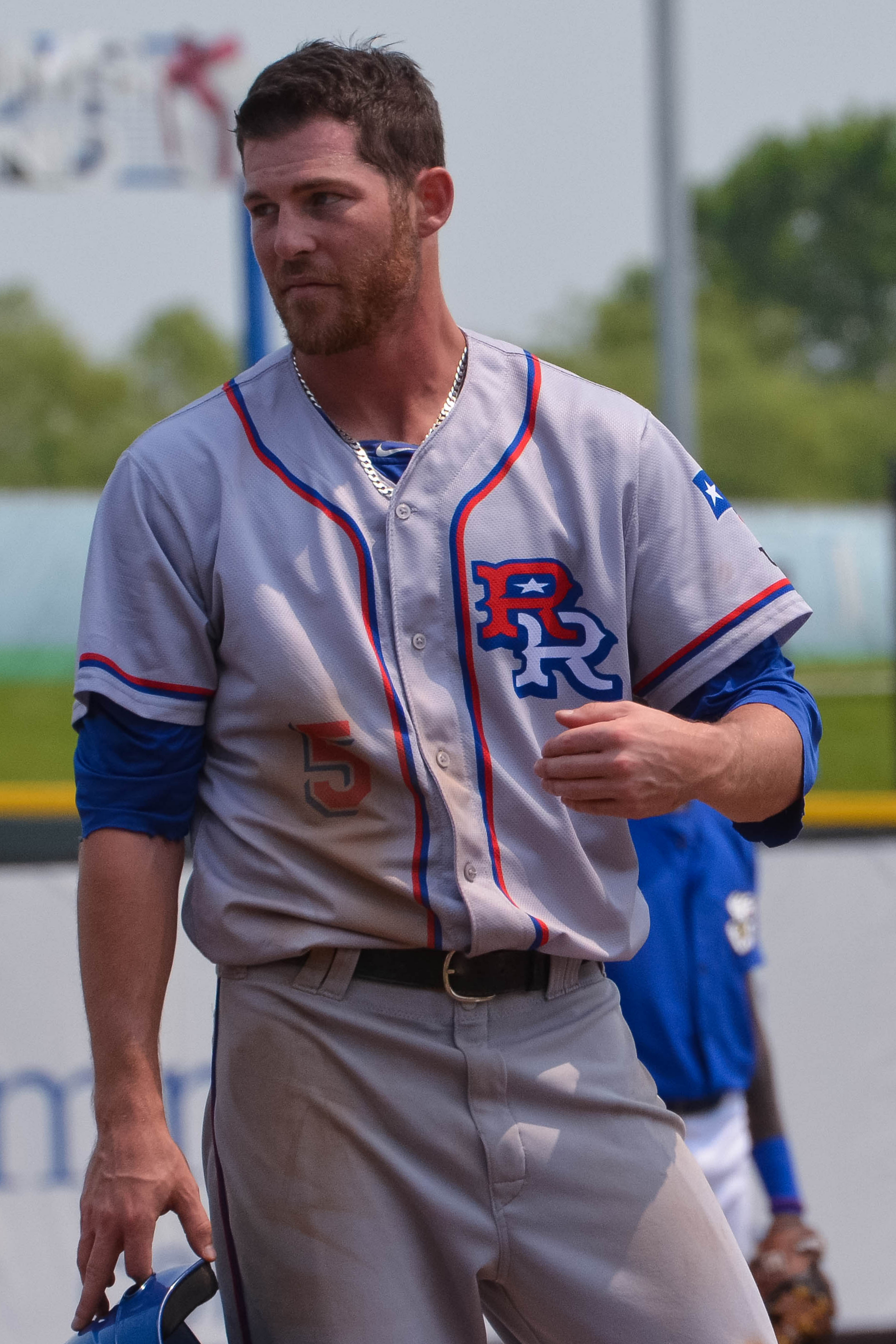
- Strausborger during his tenure with the Round Rock Express in 2015
- Left fielder
- Born: March 4, 1988 (age 38); Elkhart, Indiana, U.S.
- Batted: Right Threw: Right

MLB debut
- August 5, 2015, for the Texas Rangers

Last MLB appearance
- October 4, 2015, for the Texas Rangers

MLB statistics
- Batting average: .200
- Hits: 9
- Home runs: 1
- Runs batted in: 3
- Stats at Baseball Reference

Teams
- Texas Rangers (2015)

Ryan Lee Strausborger (born March 4, 1988) is an American former professional baseball left fielder. He played in Major League Baseball (MLB) for Texas Rangers.

== Career ==
Strausborger played college baseball at Indiana State University; where he was thrice a 1st team, 'All-MVC player; he ranks among the career leaders in most offensive categories for the Indiana State Sycamores.

=== Texas Rangers ===
He was drafted by the Texas Rangers in the 16th round of the 2010 Major League Baseball draft. He made his professional debut with the Low-A Spokane Indians. He spent the 2011 season with the High-A Myrtle Beach Pelicans, slashing .270/.347/.416 in 126 games. In 2012, Strausborger played for the Double-A Frisco RoughRiders, slashing .247/.309/.474 with 6 home runs and 46 RBI. Strausborger remained in Frisco for the 2013 season, batting .217/.286/.347 in 133 games. He split the next season between Frisco and the Triple-A Round Rock Express, where he hit .274/.330/.407 between the two teams.

Strausborger was called up to the majors for the first time on August 4, 2015, and made his MLB debut the next day, going hitless in two at-bats. Strausborger hit .200/.240/.267 in 31 major league games before he was outrighted off the 40-man roster on October 21, 2015. He was assigned to Triple-A Round Rock to begin the 2016 season.

=== Seattle Mariners ===
On July 5, 2016, Strausborger was acquired by the Seattle Mariners from the Rangers in exchange for an International Bonus slot. He finished the season with the Triple-A Tacoma Rainiers, batting .153/.244/.225 before electing free agency on November 7.

=== Minnesota Twins ===
On March 30, 2017, Strausborger signed a minor league contract with the Minnesota Twins and was assigned to the Triple-A Rochester Red Wings. Strausborger minimally played between Rochester and the Double-A Chattanooga Lookouts due to injury, and was released on August 10. He re–signed with the Twins on a new minor league deal on August 29. He appeared in 41 games, and batted an underwhelming .224 between the two clubs before electing free agency on November 6.

=== Southern Maryland Blue Crabs ===
On March 28, 2018, Strausborger signed with the Southern Maryland Blue Crabs of the independent Atlantic League of Professional Baseball. He became a free agent following the 2018 season. In 94 games he hit .247/.306/.383 with 10 home runs, 44 RBIs and 11 stolen bases.
