= Indiana State Sycamores women's basketball =

American women's college basketball team

| 2025–26 Indiana State Sycamores women's basketball team |
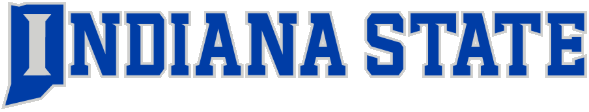
- University: Indiana State University
- Head coach: Marc Mitchell (2nd season)
- Location: Terre Haute, Indiana
- Arena: Hulman Center (capacity: 10,200)
- Conference: Missouri Valley
- Nickname: Sycamores
- Colors: Royal blue and white
- Student section: The Forest

AIAW tournament appearances
- 1973

Conference regular-season champions
- 1989 (Gateway); 2003, 2006, 2014 (Missouri Valley)

Uniforms
| Home | Away |

The Indiana State Sycamores women's basketball team is an NCAA Division I women's basketball program of Indiana State University in Terre Haute, Indiana. The Sycamores compete in the Missouri Valley Conference.

== Sycamore basketball history ==
In 1971, women's basketball became an intercollegiate sport at Indiana State University. In 1982, the sport was elevated to revenue status, which meant more money was available. Under Coach Edith Godleski, Indiana State qualified for its first WNIT Tournament game in 1976. The Sycamores were a charter member of the Gateway Conference in 1983, maintaining membership until the Gateway merged with the Missouri Valley Conference in 1992. In 1989, Indiana State won its first regular season championship. They won Missouri Valley titles in 2003 and 2006, though they failed to win the tournament title.

== Season-by-season results ==
| Season | Head coach | Overall | Conference | Postseason / Notes |
|---|---|---|---|---|
| 1971–72 | Edith Godleski | 4–9 | | |
| 1972–73 | Edith Godleski | 16–7 | | AIAW First Round |
| 1973–74 | Edith Godleski | 15–5 | | |
| 1974–75 | Edith Godleski | 18–7 | | IAIAW Third Round, MAIAW Regional, WNIT |
| 1975–76 | Edith Godleski | 19–9 | | IAIAW Champion, MAIAW Regional Final, WNIT |
| 1976–77 | Edith Godleski | 19–9 | | IAIAW, MAIAW Regional |
| 1977–78 | Edith Godleski | 12–8 | | |
| 1978–79 | Edith Godleski | 14–10 | | |
| 1979–80 | Edith Godleski | 19–13 | | IAIAW Champion, MAIAW Regional |
| 1980–81 | Edith Godleski | 11–21 | | IAIAW |
| 1981–82 | Edith Godleski | 9–18 | | IAIAW, MAIAW Regional |
| 1982–83 | Andi Myers | 13–15 | | |
| 1983–84 | Andi Myers | 5–23 | 2–16 (9th) | |
| 1984–85 | Andi Myers | 10–18 | 7–11 (T-6th) | |
| 1985–86 | Andi Myers | 5–23 | 4–14 (T-8th) | |
| 1986–87 | Andi Myers | 12–15 | 8–10 (7th) | |
| 1987–89 | Andi Myers | 22–6 | 14–5 (T-1st) | |
| 1988–89 | Andi Myers | 18–9 | 10–8 (5th) | |
| 1980–90 | Kay Riek | 8–19 | 5–13 (8th) | |
| 1990–91 | Kay Riek | 13–14 | 8–10 (7th) | |
| 1991–92 | Kay Riek | 10–17 | 7–11 (T-6th) | |
| 1992–93 | Kay Riek | 8–18 | 4–12 (T-7th) | |
| 1993–94 | Kay Riek | 14–14 | 6–10 (6th) | |
| 1994–95 | Kay Riek | 13–14 | 10–8 (6th) | |
| 1995–96 | Cheryl Reeve | 7–19 | 3–15 (9th) | |
| 1996–97 | Cheryl Reeve | 14–13 | 9–9 (T-4th) | |
| 1997–98 | Cheryl Reeve | 17–11 | 10–8 (4th) | |
| 1998–99 | Cheryl Reeve | 18–11 | 10–8 (4th) | WNIT First Round |
| 1999–2000 | Cheryl Reeve | 9–18 | 5–13 (T-7th) | |
| 2000–01 | Cheryl Reeve / Jim Wiedie | 10–18 | 7–11 (7th) | Reeve resigned on December 1, 2000. |
| 2001–02 | Jim Wiedie | 11–17 | 7–11 (8th) | |
| 2002–03 | Jim Wiedie | 21–10 | 12–6 | WNIT First Round |
| 2003–04 | Jim Wiedie | 16–12 | 10–8 (4th) | |
| 2004–05 | Jim Wiedie | 23–9 | 13–5 (T-2nd) | WNIT Second Round |
| 2005–06 | Jim Wiedie | 27–4 | 17–1 (1st) | |
| 2006–07 | Jim Wiedie | 19–11 | 12–6 (3rd) | |
| 2007–08 | Jim Wiedie | 14–15 | 8–10 (6th) | |
| 2008–09 | Jim Wiedie | 14–16 | 10–8 | |
| 2009–10 | Jim Wiedie | 11–10 | 2–8 | Suspended after 21 games, resigned March 30, 2010 |
| 2009–10 | Staff | 6–4 | 5–3 (T-7th) | 7–11 in conference for both coaches |
| 2010–11 | Teri Moren | 16–16 | 8–10 (T-7th) | |
| 2011–12 | Teri Moren | 15–16 | 9–9 (T-5th) | |
| 2012–13 | Teri Moren | 18–13 | 10–8 (4th) | WNIT First Round |
| 2013–14 | Teri Moren | 20–11 | 14–4 (T-1st) | WNIT First Round |
| 2014–15 | Joey Wells | 17–13 | 7–11 (6th) | |
| 2015–16 | Joey Wells | 13–17 | 9–9 (6th) | |
| 2016–17 | Joey Wells | 12–18 | 6–12 (8th) | |
| 2017–18 | Josh Keister (Interim) | 11–19 | 9–9 (5th) | |
| 2018–19 | Vicki Hall | 11–19 | 5–13 (8th) | |
| 2019–20 | Vicki Hall | 5–25 | 3–15 (9th) | No postseason due to COVID-19 pandemic |
| 2020–21 | Vicki Hall | 5–14 | 2–12 (9th) | |
| 2021–22 | Chad Killinger | 11–20 | 5–13 (8th) | |
| 2022–23 | Chad Killinger | 11–19 | 6–14 (10th) | |
| 2023–24 | Chad Killinger | 11–21 | 6–14 (9th) | |

== Postseason history ==
Indiana State basketball is rich in history, with 17 post-season appearances (6 WNIT appearances, 5 MAIAW Regional appearances and 6 IAIAW appearances), though no NCAA Tournament appearances. They have won three Missouri Valley Conference regular season titles and 1 Gateway Conference title. Prior to joining the NCAA, they won three Indiana Association for Intercollegiate Athletics for Women titles and four in-season Tournament titles.

=== Women's National Invitation Tournament ===
Indiana State has appeared in the Women's National Invitation Tournament six times. They have a record of 2–6.

| Year | Round | Opponent | Result |
|---|---|---|---|
| 1999 | First Round | Wisconsin | L 43–80 |
| 2003 | First Round | Ball State | L 87–91 (OT) |
| 2005 | First Round; Second Round | Illinois; Xavier | W 72–60; L 72–79 |
| 2006 | First Round; Second Round | Eastern Michigan; Indiana | W 79–57; L 62–68 |
| 2013 | First Round | Youngstown State | L 51–63 |
| 2014 | First Round | Marquette | L 61–63 |

=== AIAW appearances ===
Indiana State made one appearance in the AIAW women's basketball tournament. They had a record of 0–1.

| Year | Round | Opponent | Result |
|---|---|---|---|
| 1973 | First Round | Immaculata | L 48–59 |

=== National Women’s Invitation Tournament ===
Indiana State made two appearances in the National Women's Invitational Tournament. They had a record of 0–2.

| Year | Round | Opponent | Result |
|---|---|---|---|
| 1976 | First Round | UNLV | L 75–87 |
| 1977 | First Round | UCLA | L 73–102 |

== Rivalries ==
The Sycamores share a rivalry with the Ball State Cardinals, who lead the series 21–8. As of the 2023 season, the Sycamores are tied 11–11 in their series with the Purdue Boilermakers.

== Retired Numbers ==
Two Sycamore players have had their numbers retired by the school. Amy Hile is the latest, with her number 15 retired by the school on February 19, 2022.

Indiana State Sycamores retired numbers
| No. | Player | Position | Tenure |
| 15 | Amy Hile | F | 1983–1987 |
| 22 | Melanie Boeglin | G | 2002–2006 |

== National awards ==
=== All-Americans (1) ===
- Melanie Boeglin (2006) – 3rd Team, Full Court Press, the Associated Press, The Sports Network and WBCA.

=== CoSIDA Academic All-Americans (6) ===
- Amy Hile (1987)
- Melanie Boeglin (2006)
- Laura Rudolphi (2007, 2008)
- Kelsey Luna (2009, 2010)

=== NCAA Postgraduate Scholarship (1) ===
- Kelsey Luna (2010)

=== WBCA's National Team GPA Award (3) ===
- 2003, 2005, 2009

== Conference (Missouri Valley / Gateway) Awards ==
=== Jackie Stiles Missouri Valley Player of the Year (1) ===
- Melanie Boeglin (2006)

=== MVC Defensive Player of the Year (2) ===
- Amy Amstutz (1999)
- Melanie Boeglin (2005)

=== MVC Prairie Farms Scholar-Athlete of the Year (4) ===
- Kourtney Mennen (2003)
- Melanie Boeglin (2006)
- Laura Rudolphi (2007)
- Kelsey Luna (2009)

=== MVC Freshman of the Year (2) ===
- Stephanie Lisch (2004)
- Kelsey Luna (2007)

=== MVC Newcomer of the Year (2) ===
- Amy Amstutz (1997)
- Ashley Clark (2005)

=== Rawlings MVC Coach of the Year (2) ===
- Jim Wiedie (2003, 2006)

=== Gateway Rookie of the Year (2) ===
- Amy Hile (1984)
- Hazel Olden (1991)

=== Gateway Coach of the Year(1) ===
- Andi Myers (1988)

== All-time records ==
=== Career records ===
- Most Points: Amy Hile – 1,944 (1983–87)
- Most Rebounds: Amy Hile – 916 (1983–87)
- Most Assists: Melanie Boeglin – 685 (2002–06) Missouri Valley record
- Most Steals: Melanie Boeglin – 444 (2002–06) Missouri Valley record
- Most Blocks: Laura Rudolphi – 154 (2004–08)
- Most 3-Point Field Goals: Kelsey Luna – 258 (2006–2010) # 5 Missouri Valley Conference

=== Single season records ===
- Most Points: Melanie Boeglin – 600 (2005–06)
- Most Rebounds: Georgia Bottoms – 286 (1994–95)
- Most Assists: Melanie Boeglin – 217 (2005–06)
- Most Steals: Melanie Boeglin – 123 (2004–05)
- Most Blocks: Laura Rudolphi – 52 (2007–08)
- Most 3-Point Field Goals: Kourtney Mennen – 82 (2002–03)

=== Single game records ===
- Most Points: Melanie Boeglin – 46 (2006)
- Most Rebounds: Amy Hile – 22 (1984)
- Most Assists: Melanie Boeglin – 19 (2005) Missouri Valley record
- Most 3-Point Field Goals: 5 players – 7 (most recent 2006)

=== Coaching leaders ===
| Seasons | Head coach | Wins | Losses | Pct | Postseason |
|---|---|---|---|---|---|
| 2000–2010 | Jim Wiedie | 166 | 118 | .585 | 2003–04, 2005–06, 2006–07 |
| 1971–1982 | Edith Godleski | 156 | 116 | .574 | 1975–76, 1976–77, 1977–78, 1980–81, 1981–82, 1982–83 |
| 1982–1989 | Andi Myers | 85 | 109 | .438 | |
| 2010–2014 | Teri Moren | 69 | 56 | .552 | 2012–13, 2013–14 |
| 1995–2000 | Cheryl Reeve | 66 | 77 | .462 | 1999–2000 |
| 1989–1995 | Kay Riek | 66 | 96 | .407 | |
| 2014–2018 | Joey Wells | 30 | 30 | .500 | |
| 2018–2021 | Vicki Hall | 21 | 59 | .263 | |
| 2010 | Staff | 6 | 4 | .600 | |
| 2021–present | Chad Killinger | 5 | 6 | .455 | |
| 1971–present | All-Time | 684 | 701 | .494 | Twelve Appearances |

== Basketball Hall(s) of Fame ==
Hall of Fame Sycamores

=== Indiana Basketball Hall of Fame (16) ===
- Jan Conner – 2002 (Player, 1970–1974)
- Dru (Cox) Pearcy – 2004 (Player, 1977–1981)
- Chanda Kline – 2004 (Player, 1978–1982)
- Florida Lowry – 2004 (Player, 1947–1951)
- Rochelle Newell – 2004 (Player, 1976–1980)
- Barbara Jean Graves – 2005 (Player, 1979–1983)
- Cheryl (Endicott) Weatherman – 2005 (Player, 1960–1964)
- Jeannie Butler – 2006 (Player, 1953–1957)
- Betty Lou Clark – 2008 (Player, 1970–1974)
- Cindy (Beesley) Aguirre – 2011 (Player, 1978–1982)
- Dru Lisman – 2011 (Player, 1969–1973)
- Amy Hile – 2012 (Player, 1983–1987)
- Teri Moren – 2012 (Head Coach, 2010–2014)
- Vicki Hall – 2015 (Head Coach, 2018–2021)
- Amy Walker Sundt – 2021 (Player, 1991–1995)
- Amy S. Vanderkolk – 2022 (Player, 1985–1989)
- Carolyn Pieper – 2025 (Player, 1971–1975)
- Lori (Castetter) Walton – 2025 (Player, 1984–1989)

=== Indiana State University Hall of Fame (10) ===
- Ann Reifel – 1985
- Maybelle Steeg Lammers – 1999
- Jan Conner – 2000
- Barbara Graves – 2002
- Amy Hile – 2005
- Patricia Porter – 2007
- Amy Armstutz – 2009
- Edith Godleski – 2009
- Denise Sharps – 2010
- Mel Boeglin – 2012
