= Steve Garrison =

American baseball player (born 1986)

- Pitcher
- Born: September 12, 1986 (age 39); Trenton, New Jersey, U.S.
- Batted: Switch Threw: Left

MLB debut
- July 25, 2011, for the New York Yankees

Last appearance
- July 25, 2011, for the New York Yankees

MLB statistics
- Win–loss record: 0–0
- Earned run average: 0.00
- Strikeouts: 0
- Stats at Baseball Reference

Teams
- New York Yankees (2011)

Stevenson Nathaniel Garrison (born September 12, 1986) is an American former professional baseball pitcher. He played in Major League Baseball (MLB) for the New York Yankees in 2011.

Garrison grew up in Ewing Township, New Jersey and attended The Hun School of Princeton in Princeton, New Jersey.

== Professional career ==
=== Milwaukee Brewers ===
Garrison was selected by the Milwaukee Brewers in the 10th round (295th overall) of the 2005 Major League Baseball draft. He made his professional debut with the rookie-level Arizona League Brewers. Garrison made 17 appearances (16 starts) for the Single-A West Virginia Power in 2006, posting a 7-6 record and 3.45 ERA with 77 strikeouts across 88 2/3 innings pitched.

Garrison began the 2007 campaign with the High-A Brevard County Manatees, pitching to an 8-4 record and 3.44 ERA with 74 strikeouts in 20 starts.

=== San Diego Padres ===
On July 25, 2007, Garrison was traded to the San Diego Padres with Will Inman and Joe Thatcher in exchange for Scott Linebrink.

On November 20, 2009, the Padres added Garrison to their 40-man roster to protect him from the Rule 5 draft. He made 17 appearances (11 starts) for the rookie-level Arizona League Padres, High-A Lake Elsinore Storm, and Triple-A Portland Beavers, accumulating a 2-4 record and 5.37 ERA with 38 strikeouts over 57 innings of work. On September 6, 2010, Garrison was designated for assignment by the Padres.

=== New York Yankees ===
On September 9, 2010, Garrison was claimed off waivers by the New York Yankees. He joined the Double-A Trenton Thunder for the 2010 Eastern League playoffs.

Garrison was promoted to the major leagues for the first time on July 19, 2011. Garrison made his major league debut on July 25, against the Seattle Mariners, recording the last two outs in a 10–3 Yankees win. Garrison was designated for assignment by New York on September 11, following the promotion of Austin Romine. He became a minor league free agent after the season.

=== Seattle Mariners ===
On November 22, 2011, Garrison signed a minor league contract with the Seattle Mariners. He made 24 appearances (21 starts) for the Double-A Jackson Generals and Triple-A Tacoma Rainiers in 2012, posting a combined 6-9 record and 5.13 ERA with 58 strikeouts across 124 2/3 innings pitched.

=== Later career ===
Garrison signed a minor league contract with the Arizona Diamondbacks in December 2012.

On February 14, 2014, Garrison signed a minor league contract with the Baltimore Orioles organization.

Garrison played with the Long Island Ducks for part of the 2014 season before being released. In 2015, Garrison signed with the Camden Riversharks. He became a free agent after the 2015 season.
