= 2006–07 EuroLeague Women =

- League: EuroLeague Women
- Sport: Basketball

Regular Season

Final

EuroLeague Women seasons
- ← 2005–06 2007–08 →

The EuroLeague Women is an international basketball club competition for elite clubs throughout Europe. The 2006–2007 season features 18 competing teams from 10 different countries. The draw for the groups was held on August 6, 2006, in Munich. The competition began on November 1, 2006.

Note that the competition is operated by FIBA Europe — unlike the men's Euroleague, which is run by a body known as Euroleague Basketball (company).

== Regular season ==
Key to colors
Top five places in each group, plus highest-ranked sixth-place team, advance to eighth-finals
Eliminated

Tiebreakers:

- Head-to-head record in matches between the tied clubs
- Overall goal average in games between the tied clubs (points scored divided by points allowed)
- Overall goal average in all group matches (first tiebreaker if tied clubs are not in the same group)

=== Group A ===
Pos	Team	Pld	W	L	PF	PA	PD	Pts	Qualification	SPA	VIL	SOP	WIS	MON	SCH
1	(Russia) Spartak Moscow Region	10	9	1	753	557	+196	19	Round of 16		–	–	–	–	–
2	(Lithuania) TEO Vilnius	10	7	3	673	678	−5	17	Round of 16	47–61		–	–	–	–
3	(Hungary) MKB Euroleasing Sopron	10	6	4	727	653	+74	16	Round of 16	–	–		83–58	–	–
4	(Poland) Wisla Can-Pack	10	5	5	736	727	+9	15	Round of 16	–	–	–		–	–
5	(France) USO Mondeville	10	3	7	710	759	−49	13	Round of 16	–	–	–	–		–
6	(Italy) Famila Schio Basket	10	0	10	559	784	−225	10		–	–	–	–	–	

Source: FIBA

=== Group B ===
	Team	Pld	W	L	PF	PA	Diff
1.	(Russia) CSKA Volgaburmash	10	8	2	704	597	107
2.	(France) CJM Bourges Basket	10	8	2	645	596	49
3.	(Hungary) MiZo Pécs	10	6	4	665	633	32
4.	(Spain) Halcon Avenida	10	4	6	636	691	−55
5.	(Belgium) Dexia Namur	10	3	7	622	657	−35
6.	(Czech Republic) ZVVZ USK Prague	10	1	9	565	663	−98

=== Group C ===
	Team	Pld	W	L	PF	PA	Diff
1.	(Turkey) Fenerbahçe Istanbul	10	8	2	711	650	61
2.	(Spain) Ros Casares Valencia	10	6	4	738	6652	86
3.	(Czech Republic) Gambrinus Brno	10	6	4	690	621	69
4.	(Russia) UMMC Ekaterinburg	10	6	4	697	707	−10
5.	(France) US Valenciennes	10	3	7	667	708	−41
6.	(Poland) Lotos Gdynia	10	1	9	600	765	−165

== Knockout Phase ==
=== Round of 16 ===
Team #1	Agg.	Team #2	1st leg	2nd leg	3rd leg
Fenerbahçe Istanbul (Turkey)	2 – 1	(Belgium) Dexia Namur	80–66	59–66	84–56
MKB Euroleasing Sopron (Hungary)	2 – 1	(Russia) UMMC Ekaterinburg	86–76	69–71	80–70
Gambrinus Brno (Czech Republic)	2 – 1	(Hungary) MiZo Pécs	80–47	56–72	67–48
TEO Vilnius (Lithuania)	2 – 0	(Spain) Halcon Avenida	78–66	74–68	
USO Mondeville (France)	0 – 2	(France) CJM Bourges Basket	53–66	63–73	
ZVVZ USK Prague (Czech Republic)	0 – 2	(Russia) Spartak Moscow Region	52–67	54–82	
Ros Casares Valencia (Spain)	2 – 0	(Poland) Wisla Can-Pack	80–72	67–57	
US Valenciennes (France)	0 – 2	(Russia) CSKA Volgaburmash	70–76	75–85	

=== Round of 8 ===
Team #1	Agg.	Team #2	1st leg	2nd leg	3rd leg
CSKA Volgaburmash (Russia)	2 – 0	(Hungary) MKB Euroleasing Sopron	75–62	75–63	
Fenerbahçe Istanbul (Turkey)	1 – 2	(Spain) Ros Casares Valencia	69–67	53–71	80–82
CJM Bourges Basket (France)	2 – 0	(Lithuania) TEO Vilnius	66–60	60–54	
Spartak Moscow Region (Russia)	2 – 1	(Czech Republic) Gambrinus Brno	58–73	81–63	72–59

== Final four ==
=== Semi finals ===
March 30
18:00

Report

Spartak Moscow Region (Russia)	90–76	(Russia) CSKA Volgaburmash
Scoring by quarter: 20–16, 18–21, 27–18, 25–21

Vidnoye
Attendance: 4500
Referees: Guerrino Cerebuch (Italy) , Marius Ciulin (Romania)

March 30
20:30

Report

CJM Bourges Basket (France)	59–73	(Spain) Ros Casares Valencia
Scoring by quarter: 21–16, 16–23, 16–18, 6–16

Vidnoye
Attendance: 2100
Referees: Robert Lottermoser (Germany) , Jasmina Tatic (Serbia)

=== Third Place ===
April 1
17:00

Report

CSKA Volgaburmash (Russia)	68–59	(France) CJM Bourges Basket
Scoring by quarter: 16–7, 17–23, 19–16, 16–13

Vidnoye
Attendance: 4500
Referees: Robert Lottermoser (Germany) , Apostolos Kalpakas (Sweden)

=== Final ===
April 1
19:30

Report

Spartak Moscow Region (Russia)	76–62	(Spain) Ros Casares Valencia
Scoring by quarter: 18–14, 20–12, 16–18, 22–18
Pts: T. Thompson 24; Rebs: T. Thompson 8 Asts: S. Bird 4		Pts: D. Milton 21; Rebs: D. Milton 11; Asts: D. Milton, E.Aguilar 2

Vidnoye
Attendance: 4700
Referees: Guerrino Cerebuch (Italy) , Jasmina Tatic (Serbia)

2006–07 EuroLeague Women Champions

Spartak Moscow Region
First title

Euroleague Women 2007 Final Four MVP — (United States) Tina Thompson, Spartak Moscow Region
