= Will Inman (baseball) =

American baseball player (born 1987)

- Pitcher
- Born: February 6, 1987 (age 39); Danville, Virginia, U.S.
- Bats: Right Throws: Right
- Stats at Baseball Reference

William Bentley Inman (born February 6, 1987) is an American former professional baseball pitcher.

== Career ==
Inman is from Danville, Virginia. Prior to playing professionally, he attended Tunstall High School in Dry Fork, Virginia. He received a scholarship to attend Auburn University.

Inman was drafted in the third round of the 2005 Major League Baseball draft by the Milwaukee Brewers, beginning his professional career that season. He split the year between the Helena Brewers and Arizona League Brewers, going a combined 6–0 with a 1.91 ERA in 14 games (five starts). He struck out 59 batters in 47 innings of work. In 2006, he pitched for the West Virginia Power, going 10–2 with a 1.71 ERA in 23 games (20 starts) and striking out 134 batters in 110 2/3 innings of work. His 134 strikeouts were the most strikeouts in a single season in West Virginia Power history, until Tyler Glasnow broke his record in 2013.

Before the 2007 season, Baseball America named Inman the 91st best baseball prospect. He began the season in the Brewers organization, playing for the Brevard County Manatees and Huntsville Stars. However, on July 25, he was traded with Joe Thatcher and minor leaguer Steve Garrison for relief pitcher Scott Linebrink. He finished the season with the San Antonio Missions in the Padres system. Overall, he went 8–11 with a 3.28 ERA in 28 games started, striking out 180 batters in 159 1/3 innings.

He pitched for the Missions again in 2008, going 9–8 with a 3.52 ERA in 28 starts, striking out 140 batters in 135 1/3 innings. He appeared in the Texas League All-Star Game and All-Star Futures Game that season. His 2009 season was split between the Missions and Portland Beavers, and he went a combined 7–9 with a 4.79 ERA in 27 starts. He began the 2010 season with the Portland Beavers, but underwent ulnar nerve transposition during the season.

On November 22, 2011, Inman signed a minor league contract with the Boston Red Sox. After pitching for the Pawtucket Red Sox during the 2012 season, he became a free agent, and signed with the Tampa Bay Rays for the 2013 season, receiving a non-roster invitation to spring training. On July 1, 2013, Inman was released by the Rays. He went 0–2 with a 6.47 ERA in 21 appearances covering 32 innings, striking out 25 for the Triple-A Durham Bulls.
