= Brian Dorsett =

American baseball player (born 1961)

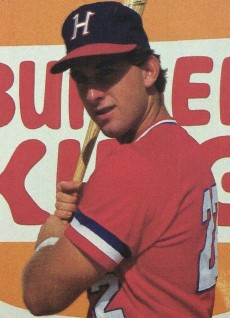
- Catcher
- Born: April 9, 1961 (age 64); Terre Haute, Indiana, U.S.
- Batted: Right Threw: Right

MLB debut
- September 8, 1987, for the Cleveland Indians

Last MLB appearance
- June 4, 1996, for the Chicago Cubs

MLB statistics
- Batting average: .224
- Home runs: 9
- Runs batted in: 51
- Stats at Baseball Reference

Teams
- Cleveland Indians (1987); California Angels (1988); New York Yankees (1989–1990); San Diego Padres (1991); Cincinnati Reds (1993–1994); Chicago Cubs (1996)

Brian Richard Dorsett (born April 9, 1961) is an American former professional baseball player who played eight seasons for the Cleveland Indians, California Angels, New York Yankees, San Diego Padres, Cincinnati Reds, and Chicago Cubs of Major League Baseball (MLB).

== Playing career ==
Dorsett attended Indiana State University, and in 1981 he played collegiate summer baseball with the Orleans Cardinals of the Cape Cod Baseball League. He was selected by the Oakland Athletics in the 10th round of the 1983 MLB draft.

== Managerial career ==
Dorsett was back involved in baseball in 2010 when he became the manager of the Terre Haute Rex, a collegiate summer baseball league in the Prospect League for three years up through 2012.

In 2012, Dorsett was selected as the Prospect League Manager of the Year.

== Personal ==
Brian currently owns and operates three car dealerships in Terre Haute, IN (Dorsett Mitsubishi, Dorsett Hyundai and Dorsett Nissan). He became a co-promoter of the Terre Haute Action Track in 2008 through 2010.
