= Nevin Ashley =

American baseball player (born 1984)

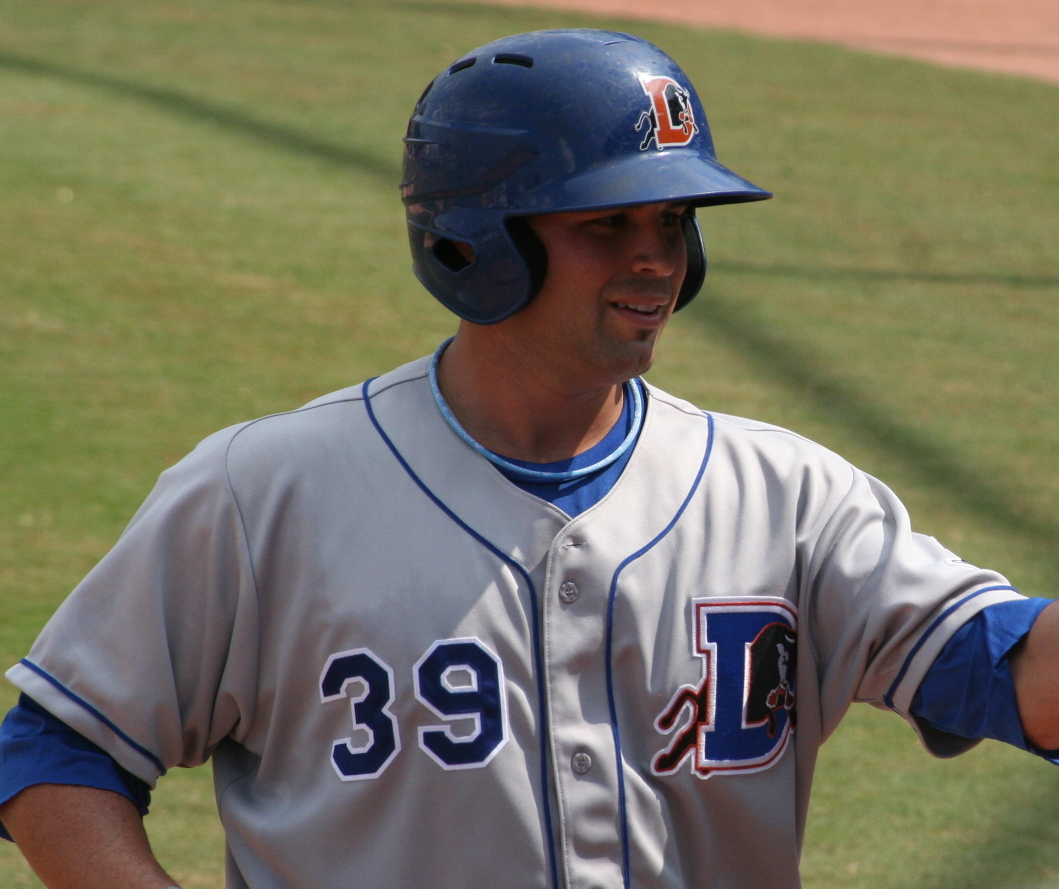
- Ashley with the Durham Bulls in 2010
- Catcher
- Born: August 14, 1984 (age 42); Vincennes, Indiana, U.S.
- Batted: Right Threw: Right

MLB debut
- September 9, 2015, for the Milwaukee Brewers

Last MLB appearance
- October 2, 2015, for the Milwaukee Brewers

MLB statistics
- Batting average: .100
- Home runs: 0
- Runs batted in: 1
- Stats at Baseball Reference

Teams
- Milwaukee Brewers (2015)

Nevin Robert Ashley (born August 14, 1984) is an American former professional baseball catcher. He played in Major League Baseball (MLB) for the Milwaukee Brewers. He was a bullpen catcher with the Toronto Blue Jays from 2020 to 2021.

== Playing career ==
=== Tampa Bay Rays ===
Prior to playing professionally, he attended North Knox High School in Bicknell, Indiana and then Indiana State University. He was drafted in the sixth round of the 2006 amateur draft by the Tampa Bay Devil Rays and began his professional career that year. With the Princeton Devil Rays in 2006, Ashley hit .333 with four home runs and 28 RBI in 47 games. The following year, with the Columbus Catfish, he hit .280 with 12 home runs, 60 RBI and 20 stolen bases - all career highs. In 2008, Ashley hit .235 with four home runs and 26 RBI in 102 games with the Vero Beach Devil Rays. He split 2009 between the Charlotte Stone Crabs and Montgomery Biscuits, hitting a combined .230 with three home runs and 36 RBI. In 2010, he hit .249 with eight home runs and 47 RBI with the Biscuits and Durham Bulls. In 2011, he hit .263/.358/.384 with 8 HR and 48 RBI between Montgomery and Durham. In 2012, Ashley hit .271/.379/.458 with 6 HR and 18 RBI between Durham and the GCL Rays. Ashley elected free agency on November 2, 2012.

=== Cincinnati Reds ===
On November 22, 2012, Ashley signed a minor league contract with the Cincinnati Reds. He spent the entire 2013 season with the Louisville Bats, and finished batting .235 in 80 games with 6 home runs and 28 RBI. On November 5, 2013, he became a free agent.

=== Pittsburgh Pirates ===
Ashley signed a minor league deal with the Pittsburgh Pirates on November 26, 2013. He spent the entire 2014 season with the Triple–A Indianapolis Indians and finished batting .246 in 70 games with two home runs and 24 RBI. On November 4, 2014, he became a free agent.

=== Milwaukee Brewers ===
Ashley signed a minor league contract with the Milwaukee Brewers on January 5, 2015, with an invite to spring training. He was promoted to their major league roster on September 7, 2015. Two days later he made his debut against the Miami Marlins, hitting a two-out, RBI double off pitcher Tom Koehler in the top of the second inning in his first major league at-bat. The Brewers lost the game, 5–2. On October 7, 2015, he was designated for assignment by the Brewers, and Ashley subsequently elected free agency on October 14 after being outrighted to the Colorado Springs Sky Sox.

Ashley appeared in 12 games with the Brewers, batting .100 with one double and one RBI. In the minors with the Sky Sox he hit .306 with 14 doubles, eight home runs and 61 RBIs in 94 games.

=== New York Mets ===
On January 15, 2016, Ashley signed a minor league deal with the New York Mets.

=== Texas Rangers ===
On August 31, 2016, the Mets traded Ashley to the Texas Rangers in exchange for cash considerations. In three games for the Triple–A Round Rock Express, he went 1–for–0 (.100) with one RBI. Ashley elected free agency following the season on November 7.

=== Seattle Mariners ===
On January 26, 2017, Ashley signed a minor league deal with the Seattle Mariners. He was assigned to the Tacoma Rainiers on April 7, but did not make an appearance for the organization and elected free agency following the season on November 6.

== Post-playing career ==
=== Toronto Blue Jays ===
In February 2019, Ashley joined the Toronto Blue Jays as a bullpen catcher.

== Personal life ==
Ashley and his wife, Ashley, have two sons, Gaige and Aiden.Ashley passed in August 2024.
