= Mitch Stetter =

American baseball player & coach (born 1981)

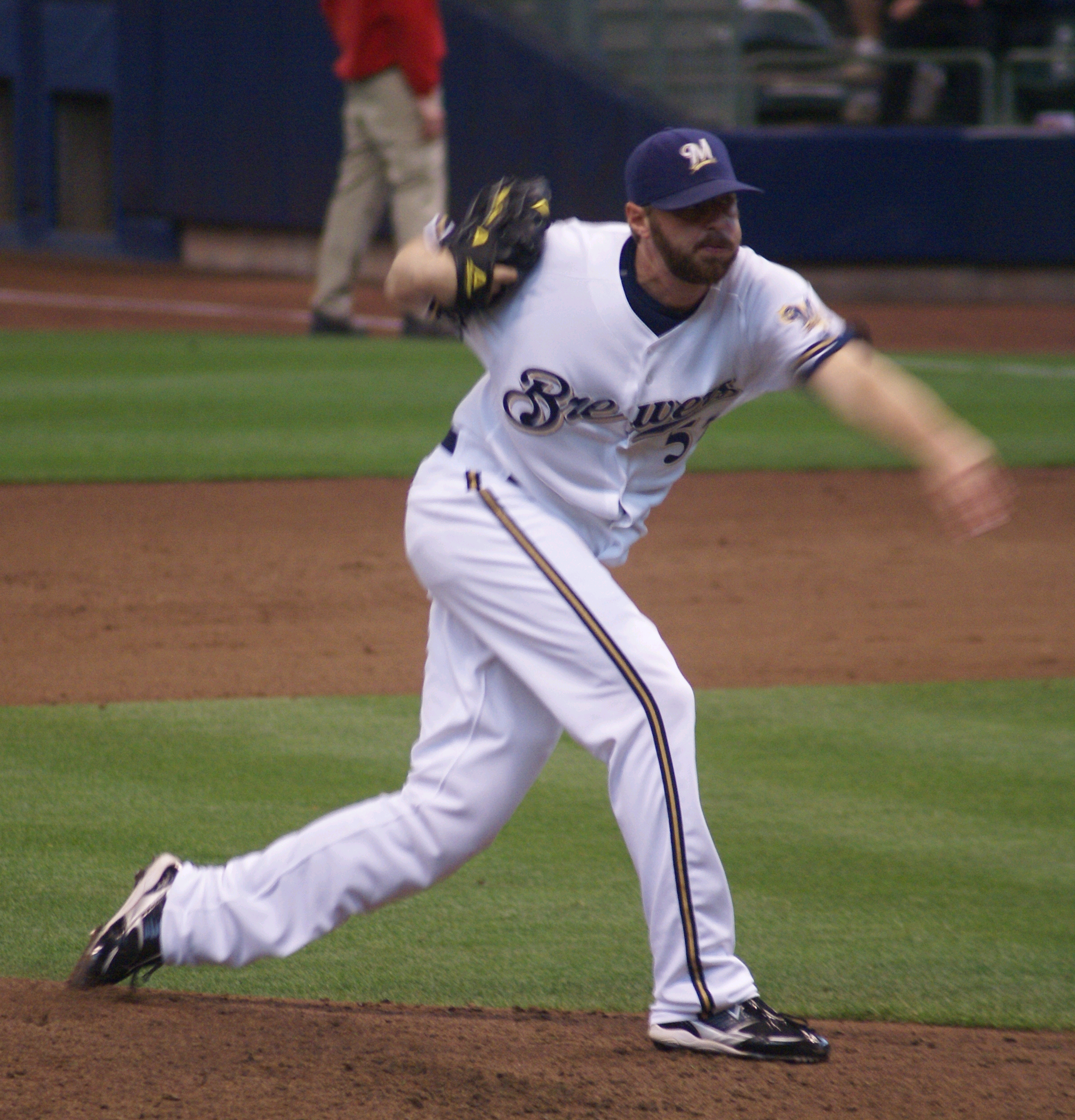
- Stetter with the Milwaukee Brewers

Kansas City Royals – No. 57
- Pitcher / Coach
- Born: January 16, 1981 (age 45); Huntingburg, Indiana, U.S.
- Batted: Left Threw: Left

MLB debut
- September 1, 2007, for the Milwaukee Brewers

Last MLB appearance
- May 14, 2011, for the Milwaukee Brewers

MLB statistics
- Win–loss record: 8–2
- Earned run average: 4.08
- Strikeouts: 89
- Stats at Baseball Reference

Teams
- As player: Milwaukee Brewers (2007–2011); As coach: Kansas City Royals (2023–present)

Mitchel Blake Stetter (born January 16, 1981) is an American former professional baseball pitcher and current coach for the Kansas City Royals of Major League Baseball (MLB). He played in MLB for the Milwaukee Brewers.

== College ==
Stetter attended Indiana State University, where he was a pitcher. In 2001 and 2002, he played collegiate summer baseball with the Cotuit Kettleers of the Cape Cod Baseball League. Stetter led the Sycamores in strikeouts and innings pitched in three seasons and once in wins. He finished his college career fifth in strikeouts and innings pitched and holds the record for the most hit batters in a season for Sycamore baseball with 32.

== Playing career ==
=== Milwaukee Brewers ===
Stetter was then drafted in the 16th round (459th overall) by the Milwaukee Brewers in the 2003 Major League Baseball draft.

Stetter made his major league debut on September 1, 2007, against the Pittsburgh Pirates. On September 29, Stetter picked up his first major league win against the San Diego Padres and his former minor league and college teammate Joe Thatcher.

Stetter was up and down between the Brewers and Triple-A Nashville during the 2008 season. He was added to the Brewers postseason roster, where he was a left-handed specialist, striking out of Ryan Howard and Chase Utley.

On April 17, 2009, Stetter gave up Gary Sheffield's 500th career home run. On June 17, Stetter set a record by retiring his 10th and 11th consecutive batters by strikeout. This was a memorable day for Stetter as he also recorded his one and only save in major league baseball. In the bottom of the 11th, Stetter struck out the last to Indians batters to preserve a wild 9-8 Brewers victory. As of June 25, the last 15 batters Stetter has retired have been by strikeout followed by a fly out to Corey Hart ending the streak.

On November 15, 2011, Stetter refused a minor league assignment and elected to become a free agent.

Stetter signed a minor league contract with the Texas Rangers on January 23, 2012. He also received an invitation to spring training. However, he was released on March 26.

Stetter re-signed with the Milwaukee Brewers on a minor league contract on April 11, 2012. In 5 seasons with the Brewers, Stetter went 8–2 with a 4.08 ERA in 132 games with 89 strikeouts in 86 innings.

=== Los Angeles Angels of Anaheim ===
On November 8, 2012, Stetter signed a minor league deal with the Los Angeles Angels of Anaheim with an invitation to spring training; Stetter has spent the 2013 season with the Salt Lake City Bees, the Angels' Triple-A affiliate.

== Coaching career ==
Stetter retired in February 2014 and accepted position as a coach in the Kansas City Royals organization.

Stetter was selected to be pitching coach for the Surprise Saguaros during the 2017 Arizona Fall League season.

Stetter was named as the Pitching Coach for the Lexington Legends for the 2019 season.

He was named the bullpen coach for the Kansas City Royals for the 2023 season.
