= Tim Barrett (baseball) =

American baseball player

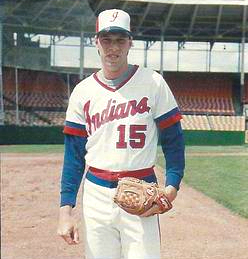
- Barrett with the Indianapolis Indians c. 1986
- Pitcher
- Born: January 24, 1961 (age 64); Otwell, Indiana, U.S.
- Batted: Left Threw: Right

MLB debut
- July 18, 1988, for the Montreal Expos

Last MLB appearance
- August 9, 1988, for the Montreal Expos

MLB statistics
- Win–loss record: 0–0
- Saves: 1
- Earned run average: 5.79
- Strikeouts: 5
- Stats at Baseball Reference

Teams
- Montreal Expos (1988)

Timothy Wayne Barrett (born January 24, 1961) is an American former professional baseball pitcher. He appeared in four games in Major League Baseball for the Montreal Expos in 1988, all as a relief pitcher.

== Career ==
Barrett spent three seasons at Indiana State University, assuming the roles of 'staff ace' from Zane Smith; he was an All-Missouri Valley Conference player (1983), leading the Sycamores to the 1983 MVC title and the NCAA National Tournament. He remains in the Top Ten in school history in several categories. He spent his freshman season at Wabash Valley College.

Barrett spent 6 seasons (1983–88) in the Montreal organization; he spent most of his minor league career in AAA with the Indianapolis Indians, of the American Association, winning titles in 1986, 1987, and 1988. He won the deciding game of the American Association title series 10–5 over the Denver Bears. All told, he spent 5 seasons with Indianapolis, with a W/L record of 19–6, 12 Saves, an ERA of 3.45, and three titles.

Barrett finished his career in the Los Angeles Dodgers organization, leading the Albuquerque Dukes to the Pacific Coast League Championship Series.

Over the course of his minor league career, Barrett accumulated a pitching record of 52–27, 3.37 ERA, 16 Saves, 5 Shutouts, and 509 Strikeouts. On August 7, 1988, he picked up his one and only big league save, though it was by no means a thing of beauty. He closed out the game, pitching the final 3 innings, allowing 4 hits and 3 earned runs in a 11–5 victory over the Cardinals.
