= Joe Thatcher =

American baseball player (born 1981)

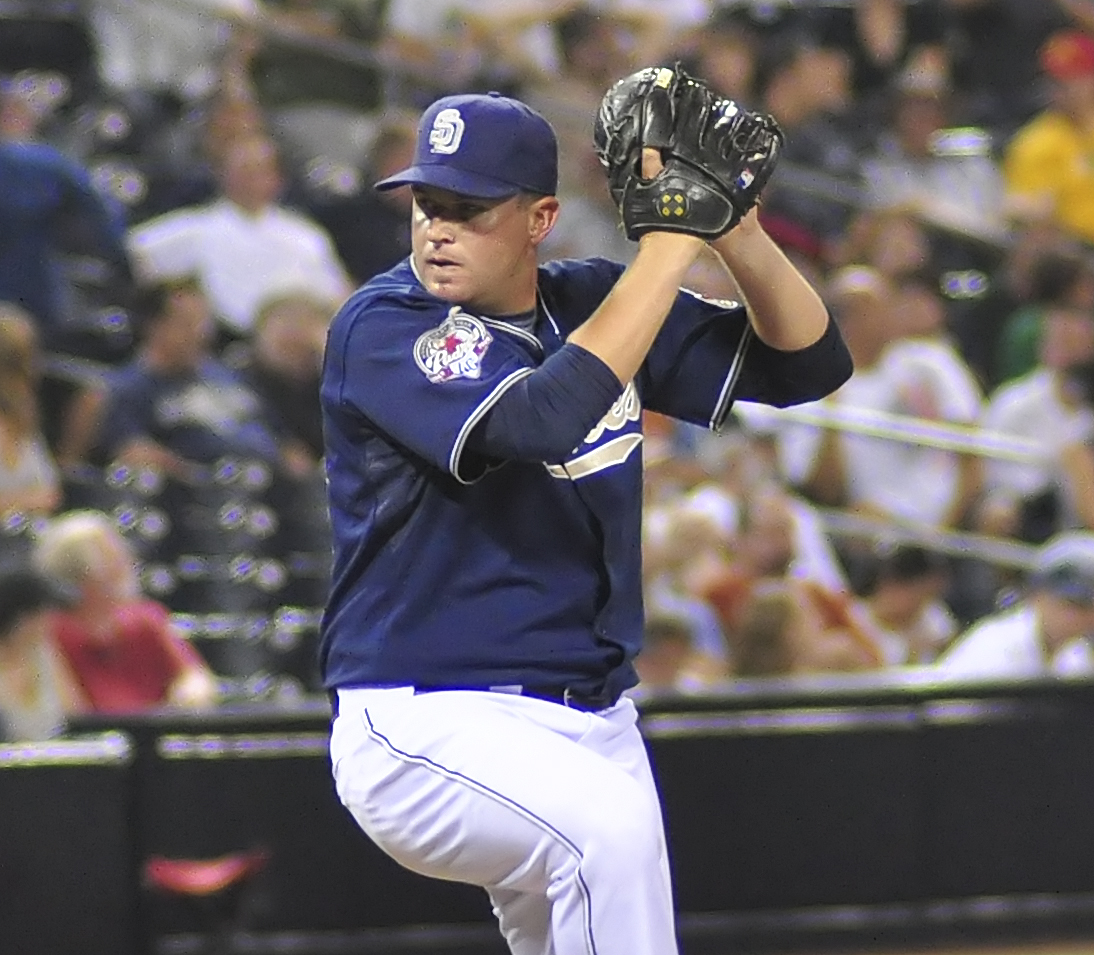
- Thatcher with the San Diego Padres in 2009
- Pitcher
- Born: October 4, 1981 (age 45); Kokomo, Indiana, U.S.
- Batted: Left Threw: Left

MLB debut
- July 26, 2007, for the San Diego Padres

Last MLB appearance
- October 2, 2015, for the Houston Astros

MLB statistics
- Win–loss record: 11–16
- Earned run average: 3.38
- Strikeouts: 270
- Stats at Baseball Reference

Teams
- San Diego Padres (2007–2013); Arizona Diamondbacks (2013–2014); Los Angeles Angels of Anaheim (2014); Houston Astros (2015)

Joseph Andrew Thatcher (born October 4, 1981) is an American college baseball coach and former professional baseball pitcher. He played in Major League Baseball (MLB) for the San Diego Padres, Arizona Diamondbacks, Los Angeles Angels of Anaheim, and Houston Astros.

== Early life ==
Thatcher was a member of Kokomo High School's baseball and basketball teams for four years; he was an all-region basketball player. He was a freshman on the 1997 team that played in Indiana's final true state tournament and set a school record for 3-pointers in a game as a senior in 2000.

== College career ==
Thatcher pitched for four seasons with Indiana State University. In 2003, he played collegiate summer baseball with the Bourne Braves of the Cape Cod Baseball League. He served as the Sycamores' closer in 2004, his final year with the team.

== Professional career ==
=== River City Rascals ===
Thatcher was not drafted upon graduating college, he signed with the River City Rascals of the independent Frontier League, appearing in 47 games (6-5 W/L, 10 Saves) in 2004 and 2005.

=== Milwaukee Brewers ===
Thatcher was signed by the Milwaukee Brewers as a free agent in 2005 and assigned to the Rookie League Helena Brewers.

=== San Diego Padres ===
Thatcher had progressed to the Triple-A Nashville Sounds in 2007 when he was traded to the San Diego Padres, along with prospects Will Inman and Steve Garrison, for relief pitcher Scott Linebrink. Thatcher was immediately placed in the bullpen of the Padres big league club.

Thatcher made his Major League debut with the Padres on July 26, 2007, in Houston against the Astros. He appeared in 22 games in 2007, finishing with a 2–2 record and 1.29 ERA. He also appeared in 8 games with the Triple-A Portland Beavers.

Thatcher began 2008 with the San Diego Padres, but was sent down to Portland in mid-May after posting a 6.75 ERA in 16 appearances. He made nine more appearances with the big league club in 2008, the final one on July 23. He finished the year with a 0–4 record and 8.42 ERA in San Diego. With Portland, he posted a 2.77 ERA over 39 total innings.

Following spring training in 2009, Thatcher started the season in Portland but was called up to San Diego on May 15, 2009. Aside from five days in June and two weeks in mid-July, he remained with the Major League club through the remainder of the year. He finished 2009 with a 2.80 ERA in 45 innings across 52 games, and 55 strike-outs against 18 walks.

Thatcher had shoulder soreness in spring training in 2010 and started the season on the disabled list, but he rejoined the team in mid-April. Thatcher emerged as one of the top left-handed specialists in the National League. He posted a 1.29 ERA in 35 innings and 65 games, with 45 strike-outs and 7 walks. He held batters to a .185 batting average and .465 OPS.

Thatcher's shoulder again gave him trouble in spring training of 2011, and he again began the season on the disabled list. But the shoulder did not respond to treatment and he was forced to undergo surgery in May. The surgery cleaned up the labrum and the rotator cuff, and Thatcher rejoined the team in August after a rehab stint. He finished with a 4.50 ERA in 10 innings over 18 games.

In 2012, Thatcher returned to his role as left-handed specialist. He initially pitched through a nagging knee soreness that eventually forced him to rest the knee throughout August and then required arthroscopic to repair a tendon after the season. Thatcher still put up a 3.41 ERA and 39 strike-outs in 31 2/3 innings. From 2009 through 2012, Thatcher appeared in 190 games and held left-handers to a .182 average. Overall, he has a 2.66 ERA and .221 opponents batting average during that span.

=== Arizona Diamondbacks ===
Thatcher again began 2013 as the Padres' left-handed specialist, pitching to a 2.10 ERA in 30 innings over 50 games. At the end of July, the Padres traded Thatcher with Matt Stites and a compensatory draft pick to the Arizona Diamondbacks for Ian Kennedy. With the Diamondbacks in 2013, Thatcher allowed 7 earned runs in 9 1/3 innings across 22 games. In the off-season, Thatcher and the Diamondbacks agreed to a one-year contract to avoid arbitration.

=== Los Angeles Angels of Anaheim ===
On July 5, 2014, Thatcher was traded along with Tony Campana to the Los Angeles Angels of Anaheim in exchange for prospects Zach Borenstein and Joey Krehbiel. He became a free agent following the season.

=== Houston Astros ===
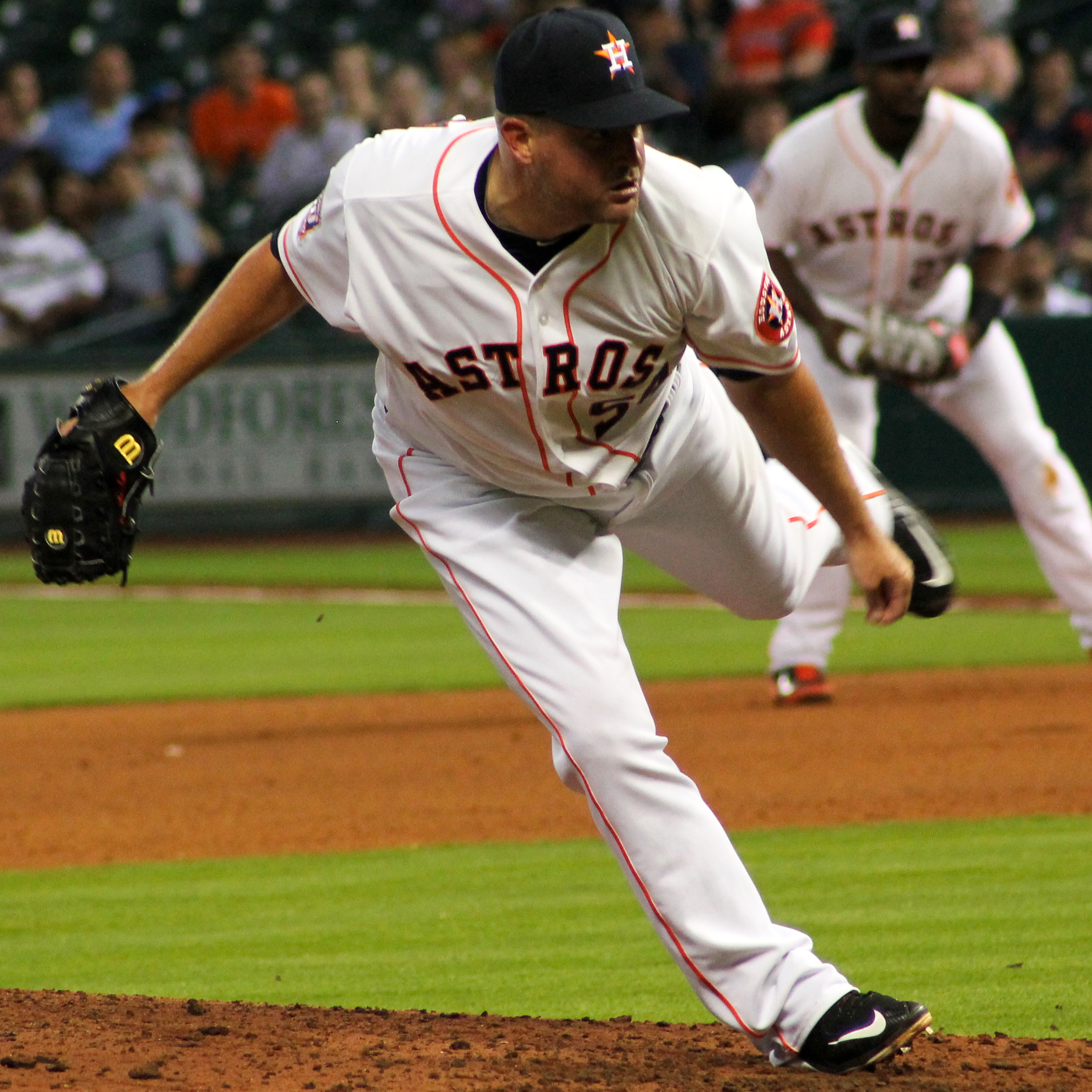
Thatcher with the Houston Astros

On February 13, 2015, Thatcher signed a minor league contract with the Houston Astros. On March 30, 2015, the Astros announced that Thatcher had made the Opening Day roster. On July 21, the Astros designated Thatcher for assignment after 36 appearances. He was released on July 28. On August 2, Thatcher was re–signed to a minor league deal. He was re–added to the major league roster on September 1. He became a free agent following the season.

=== Los Angeles Dodgers ===
On December 21, 2015, Thatcher signed a minor league contract with the Cleveland Indians organization. He was released prior to the start of the season on March 27, 2016.

On April 21, 2016, Thatcher signed a minor league contract with the Los Angeles Dodgers. In 17 games for the Triple–A Oklahoma City Dodgers, he logged a 3.60 ERA with 21 strikeouts across 15 innings. Thatcher was released on June 3, after exercising an opt–out clause in his contract.

On July 23, 2016, Thatcher signed a minor league contract to return to the Indians organization. However, he did not make an appearance for the organization before he was released on August 13.

=== Chicago Cubs ===
On August 15, 2016, Thatcher signed a minor league contract with the Chicago Cubs organization. In 10 appearances for the Triple–A Iowa Cubs, he worked to a 6.14 ERA with 11 strikeouts across 7 1/3 innings pitched. Thatcher elected free agency following the season on November 7. He retired from professional baseball shortly thereafter.

== Coaching career ==
In 2016, after retiring from professional baseball, Thatcher accepted a position as associate coach of the Indiana University Kokomo baseball team.

On January 31, 2025, the Pittsburgh Pirates hired Thatcher to serve as the bullpen coach for their Triple-A affiliate, the Indianapolis Indians.

== Pitching style ==
Thatcher was unusual in that he threw only two pitches, neither of which was a four-seam fastball. He almost exclusively threw a cut fastball at 83–87 mph or a slider at 77–79. His slider was mainly a 2-strike pitch. Early in his career, he threw a changeup to right-handed hitters, but he threw only a small handful of those after the 2008 season.

== Personal life ==
During the offseason, Thatcher resides in Kokomo, Indiana and enjoys playing golf on his down time. He is the son of Phil and Sara Thatcher and his father also pitched for Indiana State University while his mother was a cheerleader.

Thatcher's wife, Katie, is also a Kokomo native. The couple formed the Joe and Katie Thatcher Endowment Foundation in 2008 to benefit the Howard County, Indiana, community.

Thatcher is a member of Catholic Athletes for Christ.
