= Wallace Johnson (baseball) =

American baseball player

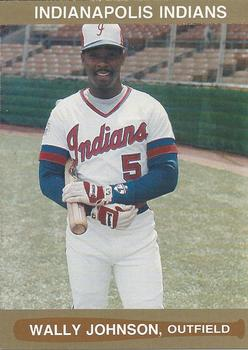
- First baseman
- Born: December 25, 1956 (age 68); Gary, Indiana, U.S.
- Batted: Switch Threw: Right

MLB debut
- September 8, 1981, for the Montreal Expos

Last MLB appearance
- August 3, 1990, for the Montreal Expos

MLB statistics
- Batting average: .255
- Home runs: 5
- Runs batted in: 59
- Stats at Baseball Reference

Teams
- Montreal Expos (1981–1983); San Francisco Giants (1983); Montreal Expos (1984, 1986–1990)

Wallace Darnell Johnson (born December 25, 1956) is an American former professional baseball player and coach. He was a first baseman with the Montreal Expos and San Francisco Giants, as well as serving a stint as the Chicago White Sox third base coach. He was known for his skill as a pinch hitter. Johnson was a switch hitter and threw right-handed.

== Amateur career ==
Johnson graduated from Indiana State with a B.S. degree in Accounting. He was named to the CoSida Academic All-American team, NCAA Postgraduate Scholarship and received the McMillan Memorial Award for leadership. Johnson was a Co-Captain of Indiana State's first Missouri Valley Conference baseball championship and first appearance in NCAA regional post season play. He led the nation in hitting (.502) during the regular season and was named the MVC tournament MVP. Johnson was named to the Missouri Valley Conference All-Centennial Team and enshrined in the Indiana State University Hall of Fame in 1985.

== Professional career ==
Wallace was drafted by the Montreal Expos in the sixth round of the 1979 amateur draft and one of the first Indiana ballplayers selected. He began his professional career in the New York-Penn League that summer; by the next season (1980) he was leading the Florida State League in batting (.334) and stolen bases (58) Johnson was named the MVP of the FSL Southern Division and received the Topps chewing gum George M Trautman Award for Minor League Player of the Year for the FSL.

Johnson played on the 1981 Denver Bears (AAA) and 1986 Indianapolis Indians (AAA) championship teams. He made his major league debut for the Expos in September 1981 and on October 3, Johnson delivered a pinch-hit triple (scoring two runs) off New York Mets ace reliever Neil Allen that help propel the team to its first ever NL East title. Johnson's was an acclaimed pinch-hitter. He was the Expos' all-time pinch-hit leader with 86. Johnson played winter ball for the champion Leones de Escogido under the direction of manager Felipe Alou and was named player of the week for the period November 30 thru December 6.

Johnson spent part of 1983 with the Giants, having been traded to them on May 25 in exchange for outfielder Mike Vail. The next spring, the Giants released him, and he returned to the Expos as a free agent shortly thereafter.

On May 2, 1988, Johnson broke up the perfect game bid of Ron Robinson of the Cincinnati Reds; Johnson got a single with two outs and two strikes in the ninth inning.

Johnson led the major leagues in pinch-hits during the period 1986–1990. In February 1990, Johnson won his arbitration case against the Expos and was the only winner of players who filed arbitration cases that year.

On August 11, 1990, Johnson was released by the Montreal Expos again and signed with the Oakland Athletics, but did not appear in any games for the A's. He played his final major league game on August 3, 1990. Johnson was a teammates with Hall of Famers Gary Carter, Andre Dawson, Tim Raines, Randy Johnson and Larry Walker during his Expos tenure.

=== Coaching career ===
Johnson spent one season as the hitting instructor for the 1994 Gulf Coast League Expos, three years (1995-1997) coaching in the Atlanta Braves minor league system and five years as the third base coach with the Chicago White Sox. He was part of the 2000 AL Central Division championship team that led the league in runs scored and offense. The team lost in the playoffs to the Seattle Mariners. Former major leaguer and TV analyst Hawk Harrelson gave Johnson the nickname "Wavin' Wally". His coaching career included instructing two Hall of Famers, Frank "Big Hurt" Thomas and Vladimir Guerrero.
