= Lick Creek, Indiana =

Unincorporated community in Indiana, US

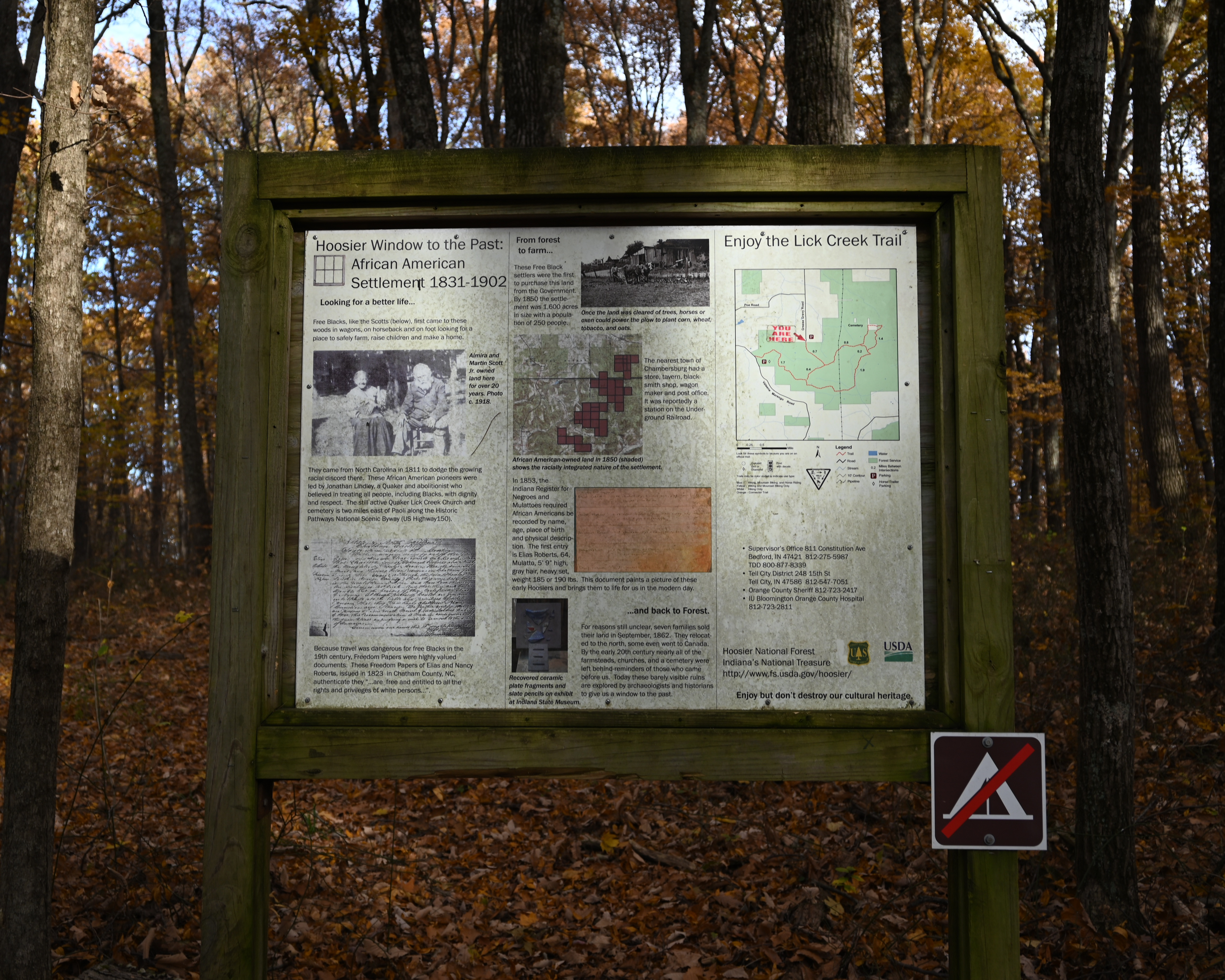
- Information sign at the Lick Creek trail entrance
- Nicknames: Little Africa, South Africa, Paddy's Garden
- Location within Indiana Location within the United States
- Coordinates: 38°29′30″N 86°24′38″W
- Country: United States
- State: Indiana
- County: Orange
- Time zone: UTC-5 (Eastern (EST))

Lick Creek (also known as Little Africa, South Africa, and Paddy's Garden) was an African American settlement in Orange County, Indiana, United States.

Established with the help of North Carolina Quakers, freeborn Black settlers purchased adjacent lots and began using their skills in agriculture to support themselves and expand the settlement. Black settlers and their white neighbors in Lick Creek interacted frequently, with the settlement becoming integrated by its decline. The size of the settlement peaked at 1,557 acres (630 hectares) in 1855 and around 260 people in 1860.

Surviving written records show settlers thriving in the rural community until around the time of the American Civil War. By the 1870s, the settlement drastically decreased in size until the last Black resident left in 1902. The land that made up the settlement has been part of the Hoosier National Forest since 1935. Visitors to the forest can access the Roberts & Thomas Family Cemetery, the last standing evidence of the settlement, via the Lick Creek Trail.

== History ==
=== Occupation ===
The first Black settlers in the area were aided by White Quaker settlers supporting Black migration to Indiana. Increasing restrictions to the rights of free Blacks in North Carolina drove many to go north with the Quakers under a trusteeship system where they would gain freedom. Quaker Jonathan Lindley brought eleven Black families from North Carolina into the area in 1811. The 1820 census recorded 96 Black settlers in the area.

Black landownership in Lick Creek began on May 21, 1831, when freeborn Black man Mathew Thomas bought 80 acres (32 hectares) of land northeast of Chambersburg, Indiana. In 1832, fellow Black settler David Dugged purchased 40 acres (16 hectares) of nearby land. That same year, Thomas and Dugged would join their land with Benjamin Roberts, Peter Lindley, and Elias Roberts to form Lick Creek Settlement when the three purchased 40 acres of U.S. government patented land each in the hills south of Chambersburg. The settlement they formed together was named for its proximity to the nearby creek of the same name. The strategic placement of Elias Roberts' land in particular is believed by Hoosier National Forest heritage program manager Angie Doyle to have been part of an effort to encourage other people of color to settle there.

By 1840 African Americans owned 780 acres (320 hectares) in Orange County. Auction records shows that Black settlers were able to live a reasonably comfortable existence as farmers. Other listed professions of settlers in the 1850 census included saddlery, shoemaking, peddling, and wagon making. The settlement had proximity to the then newly paved Vincennes Trace, which offered access to trade and travelers flowing to and from Louisville and Paoli. Black settlers had a cooperative relationship with many of their White neighbors, who would act as witnesses of good character for legal documents such as Indiana's Negro Register, which Black residents of Indiana were required to document themselves in after Indiana's second state constitution required all existing Black and Mulatto residents to register to their counties. Black and White residents often interacted and owned land on adjacent parcels.

Kinship and inter-community marriage played a role in the composition of the community. The frequency of marriage licenses issued for couples of the African ancestry in Orange County was around 1 to 3 per year. The peak years for marriage licenses were during the 1850s and 1860s, with 17 and 16 applications made in the two decades, respectively.

In September 1862, seven Black farmers suddenly sold their lands, one of them at a notable financial loss, with 559 acres (226 hectares) total being sold in the month of September. The cause of the rapid land disposal is unclear; African American genealogist Coy D. Robbins suggests the considerable financial loss and rapid land disposal indicates duress on the Black landowners. Many theories exist for the decline in population around this time, including the draft for the Civil War creating mounting pressures on the Black population, with able bodied men being pulled from their homesteads. Archaeologist Ryan Campbell and historian Nicole Etcheson agree that some may have moved to escape the draft; other settlers may have moved due to increasing racist violence by local Southern sympathizer groups like the Copperheads.

The Black population continued to dwindle throughout the late 1800s. Racial tensions and the draw of better education and employment options in cities were some of the factors that reduced Black landownership in Orange County down to 604 acres (244 hectares) by 1870. The last Black landowner, William Thomas, sold his land in 1902.

=== Forest Service acquisition ===
The land making up the former settlement was purchased by the United States Department of Agriculture Forest Service in 1935 as part of an effort to restore eroding deforested areas. Today, the site is part of Hoosier National Forest. None of the buildings from the settlement still stand, with the remaining dwellings likely torn down by the Forest Service upon acquisition to prevent squatting and safety issues. The site forms part of the 7.1-mile (11.4 km) Lick Creek Trail, a recreational trail used for hiking, camping, biking, and horse riding.

Archaeological studies and restoration projects in Lick Creek are ongoing since 1999. In 2024, descendants of the original Black settlers worked alongside volunteers to restore the Roberts & Thomas family cemetery.

== Geography ==
The Lick Creek settlement was located in parts of Southeast Township and Paoli Township, Orange County, Indiana, near 38°31′46″N 86°25′49″W. The stream it is named for flows westward toward Paoli. The settlement reached its maximum size of 1,557 acres (630 hectares) by 1855. The land sold to poor Black settlers in Lick Creek was hilly, uncleared forest, and seen as less desirable. Most early Black settlers in Indiana made a living through farming. Soil types in Lick Creek featured an abundance of loess, and the slope, erosion, and dry surface of the land meant that the area was more suited to raising livestock than planting crops.

The proximity of the settlement to the border of Kentucky, then a slave state, along with its closeness to known underground railroad stop Chambersburg has led to speculation that the community took part in harboring escaping slaves.

== Demographics ==
By the settlement's decline around 1860, Lick Creek was an integrated settlement where Black and White community members were free to intermingle. Lick Creek was the focal point of the Black community in Orange County. By 1850, over 90% of Black people in Orange County resided in the Lick Creek settlement. There is no official count of Lick Creek's Black population, but the Black population of Orange County reached a peak of 260 residents in 1860.

== Religion ==
Two churches existed on the settlement. A Methodist church, the Union Meeting House, was established when Ishmael (Jr.) and Lucretia Roberts sold an acre to trustees David Dugged and Martin Scott on April 27, 1837. It is unclear whether this was an offshoot of the White Methodist church presence in Paoli meant to serve the Black population, or if it was specifically an African Methodist Episcopal church from the beginning. The African Methodist Episcopal Church (AME) was a center of daily life in Lick Creek. The first confirmed Lick Creek AME church was built in 1843 on land sold by Thomas and Matilda Roberts to five trustees for the purpose of erecting a church. Both churches were initially part of the Salem Circuit of AME churches, and were later identified as the Lick Creek Circuit. The second AME church lasted from 1843 to 1869, when the land was bought by Eli Roberts. Membership numbers were released sporadically over the lifespan of the church, with 34 reported members in 1845 and 22 reported members and one probationer in 1862. In 1845, membership in the Lick Creek Church dwarfed the Paoli AME Church nearly 3:1. Attendance steadily declined over the years after the population drop in Lick Creek post-Civil War.

== Education ==
Indiana law limited tax support for public schools to White institutions in 1837, leaving families in Lick Creek to seek education within private schools. The 1850 Orange County census showed 6 out of 85 total school age Black children enrolled in school. Literacy grew among the Black population of the settlement, with most families having children in school in 1860. Some may have attended private Quaker-ran schools or been educated within classes at the AME Church. It is likely that school may have also been held in the home of Elias Roberts at some point, as the 1840 census lists him as having one "Primary and Common School" on the property with 20 recorded pupils. Before the establishment of the church and meeting house buildings in the 1840s, schooling likely took place within various households in this way.

== Roberts Site ==
The Roberts Site, one of the longest occupied areas of the settlement, was first identified in 1991 by Hoosier National Forest ranger Rocco Gibala. The Roberts site consists of land formerly owned by the family of Elias Roberts, with 280 acres (110 hectares) being owned by Roberts and his sons-in-law in 1840. The property would remain in the Roberts family until the death of Elias' wife, Nancy Roberts, in 1876. In the year 2000, an excavation directed by principal investigators Robert G. McCullough and William R. Wepler was undertaken to determine the remaining contents of the site. The archaeological examination of the Roberts Site was divided into a study of three structure areas found on the property labeled A, B, and C. Flagstones located between the buildings suggest the existence of other ephemeral structures that may have been on the property at some point.

Area A contained an outbuilding of unknown use. Probate inventory taken after Elias Roberts' death in 1866 suggests that it may have been a shed used for the storage of hay and oats. The lack of ceramic and glass debris combined with horseshoes found in the area also supports it serving as a barn or animal coop. Other agriculture-related entries on the probate inventory include 21 sheep, 4 cattle, 3 horses, 3 hogs and 9 shoats; crops grown on the property were wheat, corn, rye, oats, hay, straw, and tobacco.

The Roberts family lived in a roughly 16.5 ft × 20 ft (5.0 m × 6.1 m) log cabin within Area B originally set on limestone and sandstone foundation. Excavated artifacts from the structure suggest a type of porch existing at one point. A high density of artifacts including personal items such as a pewter ring, buttons, and fragments of ceramic sets were found in this area. Faunal remains of squirrels, domestic pigs, and chickens were unearthed in the proximity of a rusted butcher knife. It is unclear if the high density of artifacts from area B were due to items lost in the cracks of a porch or if they were intentionally discarded. Another feature of the cabin was a chimney constructed out of limestone and sandstone. The cabin stood through Nancy Roberts' passing and a series of White landowners, until it burned at some point before 1935.

Area C is an erosional area that likely served as a dump for the site's later inhabitants. Excavation revealed the dump containing a wide variety of artifacts, including buttons, bottles, metal fragments, and leather pieces. Studies of the soil condition show it may have once been a livestock area like a hog wallow.

A variety of cultural artifacts were found at the site, with a significant amount consisting of items such as window glass and nails. A total of 2,905 nails were found onsite, with the majority (87%) being cut nails and the remainder being wire nails. Studies by archeologists working under the Forest Service and Indiana State Museum suggest most of the nails found around the cabin area were used to attach siding in place. Numerous findings of glass fragments include 1,612 ceramic sherds discovered onsite, which comprised at least 169 vessels of earthenware, stoneware, refined earthenware, and porcelain. Refined earthenware vessels made of materials such as pearlware, whiteware, and ironstone were the most numerous. Based on vessel count, 1864 was the average year of origin for ceramics at the site. The largest amount of what appears to be window glass was recovered from Structure B, which contained 86% of all found flat glass fragments.

Personal items found at the site depict a family that lived well off of the rugged terrain. Some of these items include 93 buttons, 26 fragments of leather, a single ring, and one lens from a pair of eyeglasses. Items listed on the probate record such as three expensive mares and excavated sherds of blue-decorated whiteware signify middle class tastes consistent with the time period.

=== Roberts & Thomas Family Cemetery ===
The Roberts & Thomas Family Cemetery, also known as the Little Africa Cemetery, is a cemetery located on the former settlement used between 1856 and 1891. It is in South East Township 1.5 miles (2.4 km) miles south of Chambersburg. Burials within were limited to members of the Roberts and Thomas families, suggesting it was a private cemetery. The cemetery is the only standing remnants of the settlement today. In 1970, scoutmaster Harold Smith led Boy Scout Troop 85 in a restoration effort of the grounds. The project entailed clearing of overgrowth and the copying of gravestone inscriptions. Wooden crosses on previously unmarked graves, a fence, and a monument to two veterans, Ishmael Roberts Sr. and Simon Locust, thought to be buried in the cemetery were also erected. Simon Locust, the last person to be buried in the cemetery, was later verified as a serviceman in Company E of the 13th Infantry Regiment of the U.S. Colored Troops. The next major restoration would not occur until December 2024, led by Lick Creek settler descendants. A team of settler descendants and volunteers worked together to restore graves in the cemetery by spraying a biocide to kill off overgrowth.
