= Lindley House =

Historic house in Indiana, United States

- Thomas Elwood Lindley House
- U.S. National Register of Historic Places
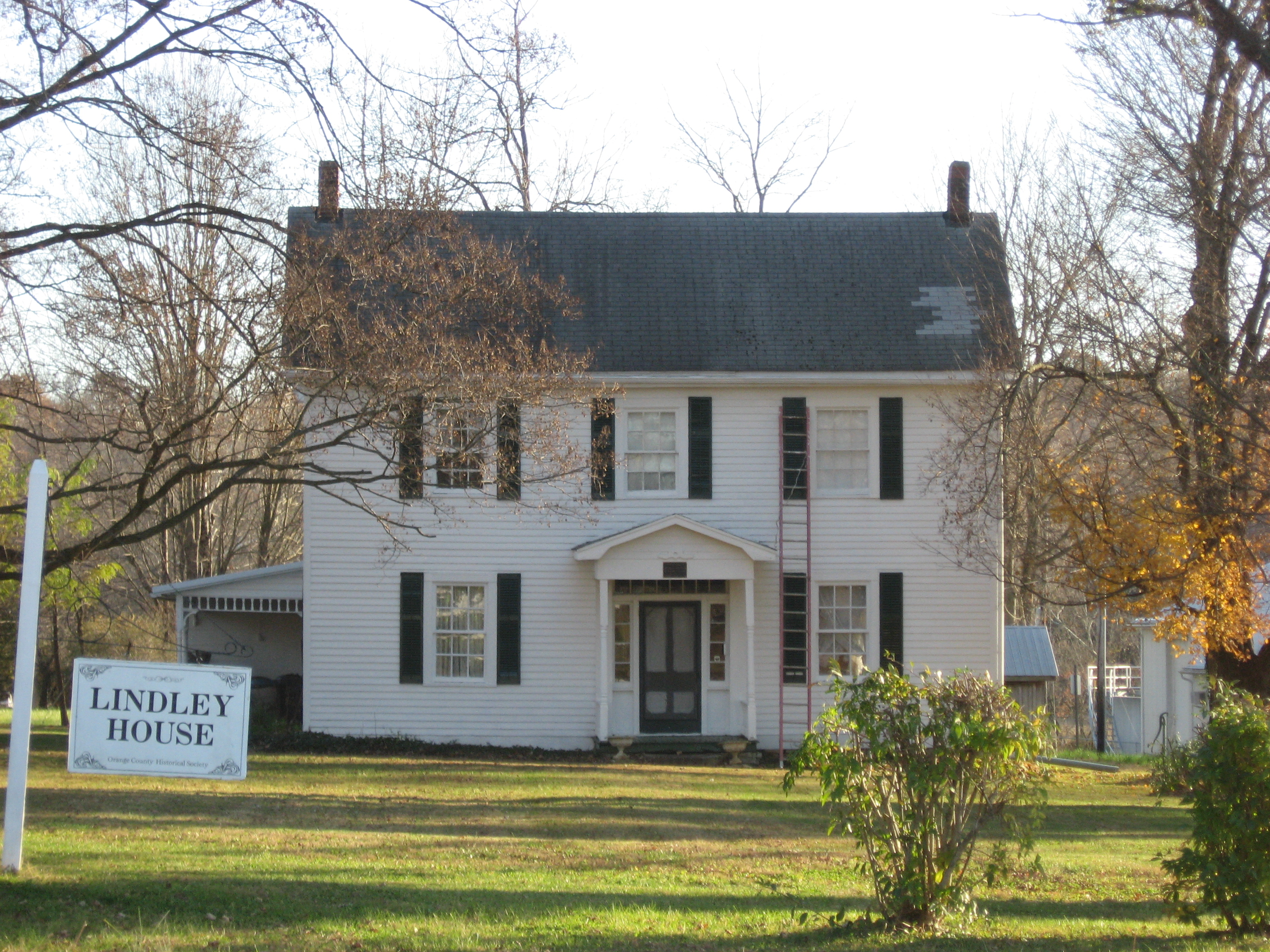

- Location within Indiana Location within the United States
- Location: Willow Creek Rd., Paoli, Indiana
- Coordinates: 38°33′25″N 86°29′11″W
- Area: 1.5 acres (0.61 ha)
- Architectural style: Greek Revival
- NRHP reference No.: 85002132
- Added to NRHP: September 12, 1985

The Thomas Elwood Lindley House is an historic home located in Paoli Township, Orange County, Indiana.

== History ==
The Thomas Elwood Lindley House was built on land granted in 1812 for Jonathan Lindley when he left North Carolina to settle in Orange County, Indiana.

Jonathan was the grandfather of Thomas Elwood Lindley, and an influential Quaker. He served in the State Legislature at the Capitol in Corydon, Indiana. The property remained in the Lindley Family until it was deeded to the Orange County Historical Society in 1974 by the great-great-grandson, H. Carl Thompson and Dorothy Farlow Thompson. The house is restored to reflect the period 1850-1869 when it was used as a farm home. It was listed on the National Register of Historic Places in 1985.
