= Northwest Township =

Northwest Township may refer to:

- Northwest Township, Stone County, Arkansas, in Stone County, Arkansas
- Northwest Township, Orange County, Indiana
- Northwest Township, St. Louis County, Missouri, in St. Louis County, Missouri
- Northwest Township, Brunswick County, North Carolina, in Brunswick County, North Carolina
- Northwest Township, Dickey County, North Dakota, in Dickey County, North Dakota
- Northwest Township, Kidder County, North Dakota, in Kidder County, North Dakota
- Northwest Township, Williams County, Ohio
