= Lynd School =

- U.S. National Register of Historic Places
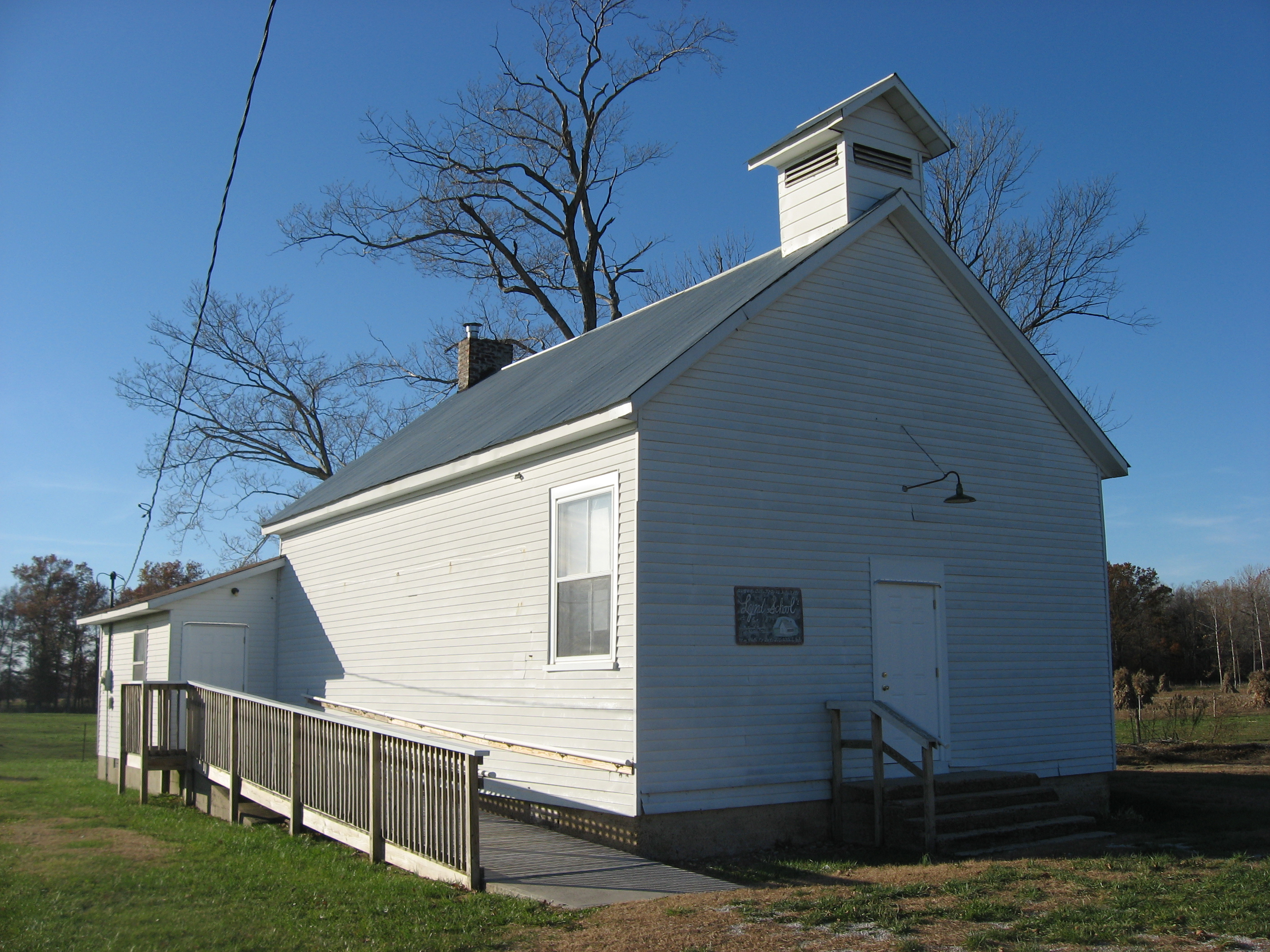
- Lynd School, November 2011

- Location within Indiana Location within the United States
- Location: 723 N. Lynd Rd., 0.6 miles north of its junction with State Road 56 and southeast of Orleans, Indiana
- Coordinates: 38°34′2″N 86°19′22″W
- Area: less than one acre
- Built: 1900, 1925
- Architectural style: One room schoolhouse
- MPS: Indiana's Public Common and High Schools MPS
- NRHP reference No.: 02001169
- Added to NRHP: October 16, 2002

Lynd School, also known as the Stamper's Creek Township School #2, is a historic one-room school located in Stampers Creek Township, Orange County, Indiana. It was built about 1900, and is a one-story, rectangular, frame building. It has a gable front facade topped by a small belfry and measures 24 feet wide and 36 feet long. It was renovated in 1925, and a kitchen / bathroom addition was built about 1970. The building remained in use as a school until 1964.

It was listed on the National Register of Historic Places in 2002.
