= John W. Summers =

American politician

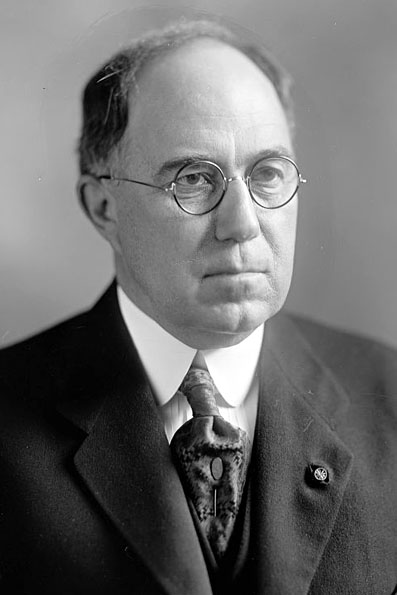

Member of the U.S. House of Representatives from Washington's 4th district
- In office March 4, 1919 – March 3, 1933
- Preceded by: William L. La Follette
- Succeeded by: Knute Hill

Member of the Washington House of Representatives
- In office 1917

Personal details
- Born: John William Summers; April 29, 1870 Valeene, Indiana, U.S.
- Died: September 25, 1937 (aged 67) Walla Walla, Washington, U.S.
- Party: Republican
- Spouse: Jennie B. (Burks) Summers
- Children: Hope Summers
- Education: Kentucky School of Medicine; Southern Indiana Normal College

John William Summers (April 29, 1870 – September 25, 1937) was an American physician and politician who served seven terms as a U.S. representative from Washington from 1919 to 1933.

== Early life and education ==
Born in Valeene, Indiana, Summers attended the public schools. He was graduated from the Southern Indiana Normal College at Mitchell, Indiana, in 1889 and from the Kentucky School of Medicine at Louisville in 1892. He pursued postgraduate studies in the Louisville Medical College and in New York, London, Berlin, and the University of Vienna, Austria.

=== Medical career ===
He commenced the practice of medicine in Mattoon, Illinois. He moved to Walla Walla, Washington, in 1908 and continued the practice of medicine. He also engaged in agricultural pursuits and fruit raising.

=== Congress ===
He served as member of the State house of representatives in 1917. Summers was elected as a Republican to the Sixty-sixth and to the six succeeding Congresses (March 4, 1919 – March 3, 1933). He was an unsuccessful candidate for reelection in 1932 to the Seventy-third Congress, and for election in 1934 to the Seventy-fourth Congress and in 1936 to the Seventy-fifth Congress.

=== Later career and death ===
He resumed former pursuits. Summers was married to Jennie (née Burks) Summers (1867–1956), a member of the Women's Christian Temperance Union, as well as active member of many club, church and organizational groups.

Summers died in Walla Walla, Washington on September 25, 1937. He was interred in Mountain View Cemetery, alongside his wife, Jennie.

=== Family ===
Summers' daughter, Hope, was a film and television actress, best remembered by TV audiences on TV's on The Andy Griffith Show and Mayberry R.F.D., as Aunt Bee's gossipy best friend Clara Edwards (1960–71).

== Sources ==
- United States Congress. "John W. Summers (id: S001067)". Biographical Directory of the United States Congress.

U.S. House of Representatives
| Preceded by William L. La Follette | Member of the U.S. House of Representatives from Washington's 4th congressional district 1919–1933 | Succeeded by Knute Hill |
