= Stampers Creek Township, Orange County, Indiana =

Stampers Creek Township
- Township
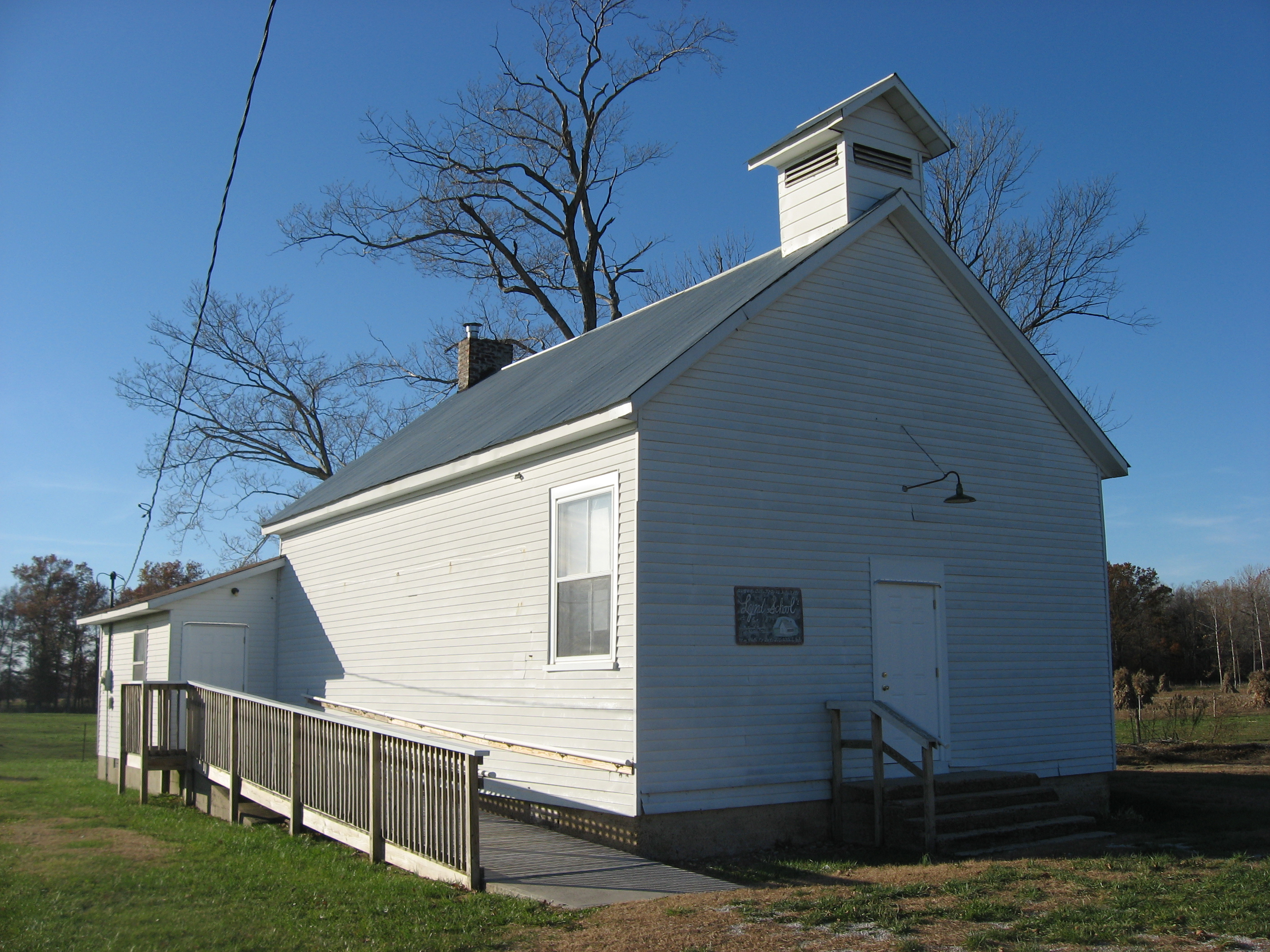
- The Lynd School, a historic site in the township

- Location in Orange County
- Coordinates: 38°32′20″N 86°20′59″W
- Country: United States
- State: Indiana
- County: Orange

Government
  - Type: Indiana township

Area
  - Total: 28.51 sq mi (73.8 km^{2})
  - Land: 28.45 sq mi (73.7 km^{2})
  - Water: 0.05 sq mi (0.13 km^{2}) 0.18%
- Elevation: 778 ft (237 m)

Population (2020)
  - Total: 1,037
  - Density: 36.45/sq mi (14.07/km^{2})
- Time zone: UTC-5 (Eastern (EST))
  - Summer (DST): UTC-4 (EDT)
- ZIP codes: 47125, 47452, 47454
- Area codes: 812, 930
- GNIS feature ID: 453870

Stampers Creek Township is one of ten townships in Orange County, Indiana, United States. As of the 2020 census, its population was 1,037 and it contained 384 housing units.

Historical population
Census	Pop.	Note	%±
1890	1,001		—
1900	1,027		2.6%
1910	893		−13.0%
1920	740		−17.1%
1930	656		−11.4%
1940	666		1.5%
1950	693		4.1%
1960	680		−1.9%
1970	618		−9.1%
1980	795		28.6%
1990	845		6.3%
2000	959		13.5%
2010	954		−0.5%
2020	1,037		8.7%
Source: US Decennial Census

== History ==
Stampers Creek Township took its name from Stampers Creek.

Lynd School was listed on the National Register of Historic Places in 2002.

== Geography ==
According to the 2010 census, the township has a total area of 28.51 square miles (73.8 km^{2}), of which 28.45 square miles (73.7 km^{2}) (or 99.79%) is land and 0.05 square miles (0.13 km^{2}) (or 0.18%) is water.

=== Unincorporated towns ===
- Mahan Crossing at 38.557278°N 86.364429°W
- Millersburg at 38.557279°N 86.33554°W
- Trotter Crossing at 38.511446°N 86.36554°W

(This list is based on USGS data and may include former settlements.)

=== Cemeteries ===
The township contains these two cemeteries: Copelin and Danners.

=== Major highways ===
- U.S. Route 150
- Indiana State Road 56

== School districts ==
- Paoli Community School Corporation

== Political districts ==
- Indiana's 9th congressional district
- State House District 62
- State Senate District 44
