= Greenbrier, Orange County, Indiana =

Greenbrier
- Unincorporated community
- Location within Indiana Location within the United States
- Coordinates: 38°27′47″N 86°33′21″W
- Country: United States
- State: Indiana
- County: Orange
- Township: Greenfield
- Elevation: 794 ft (242 m)
- Time zone: UTC-5 (Eastern (EST))
  - Summer (DST): UTC-4 (EDT)
- ZIP code: 47454
- Area codes: 812, 930
- GNIS feature ID: 450982

Greenbrier (also Green Brier) is an unincorporated community in Greenfield Township, Orange County, in the U.S. state of Indiana.

== History ==
A post office was established at Greenbrier in 1861, and remained in operation until it was discontinued in 1938.
