= Newberry Friends Meeting House =

Historic church in Indiana, United States

- U.S. National Register of Historic Places
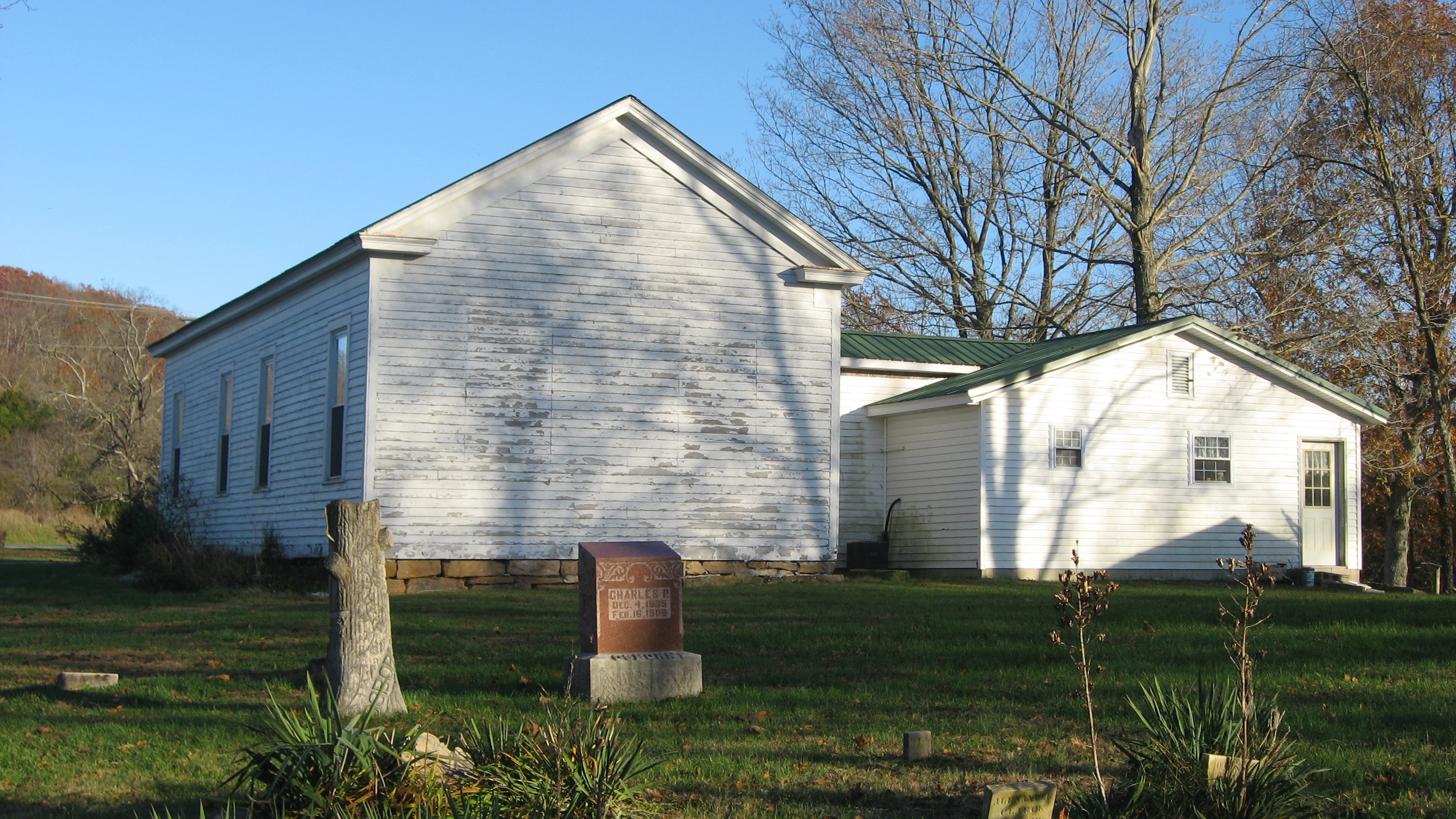
- Newberry Friends Meeting House, November 2011

- Location within Indiana Location within the United States
- Location: U.S. Route 150/State Road 56, west of Paoli, Indiana
- Coordinates: 38°33′54″N 86°30′3″W
- Area: 2 acres (0.81 ha)
- Built: 1856
- Architectural style: Greek Revival
- NRHP reference No.: 95001534
- Added to NRHP: January 11, 1996

Newberry Friends Meeting House, now the Friends of Jesus Fellowship Friends Church, is a historic Quaker meeting house and cemetery located in Paoli Township, Orange County, Indiana. It was built in 1856, and is a one-story, rectangular, vernacular Greek Revival style frame building. It sits on a rubble limestone foundation and is sheathed in clapboard siding. The adjacent cemetery was established in 1818, and the earliest marked burials date to the 1840s. The congregation played a significant role in the settlement of African Americans in Orange County.

It was listed on the National Register of Historic Places in 1996.
