= Orleans Township, Orange County, Indiana =

Orleans Township
- Township
- Location in Orange County
- Coordinates: 38°39′14″N 86°26′57″W
- Country: United States
- State: Indiana
- County: Orange

Government
  - Type: Indiana township

Area
  - Total: 35.99 sq mi (93.2 km^{2})
  - Land: 35.72 sq mi (92.5 km^{2})
  - Water: 0.26 sq mi (0.67 km^{2}) 0.72%
- Elevation: 640 ft (195 m)

Population (2020)
  - Total: 3,640
  - Density: 102/sq mi (39.3/km^{2})
- Time zone: UTC-5 (Eastern (EST))
  - Summer (DST): UTC-4 (EDT)
- ZIP codes: 47452, 47454
- Area codes: 812, 930
- GNIS feature ID: 453695

Orleans Township is one of ten townships in Orange County, Indiana, United States. As of the 2020 census, its population was 3,640 and it contained 1,519 housing units.

Historical population
Census	Pop.	Note	%±
1890	1,865		—
1900	2,323		24.6%
1910	2,371		2.1%
1920	2,385		0.6%
1930	2,408		1.0%
1940	2,308		−4.2%
1950	2,446		6.0%
1960	2,548		4.2%
1970	2,814		10.4%
1980	3,210		14.1%
1990	3,202		−0.2%
2000	3,508		9.6%
2010	3,555		1.3%
2020	3,640		2.4%
Source: US Decennial Census

== Geography ==
According to the 2010 census, the township has a total area of 35.99 square miles (93.2 km^{2}), of which 35.72 square miles (92.5 km^{2}) (or 99.25%) is land and 0.26 square miles (0.67 km^{2}) (or 0.72%) is water.

=== Cities, towns, villages ===
- Orleans

=== Cemeteries ===
The township contains these three cemeteries: Fairview, Irvin and Old.

=== Major highways ===
- Indiana State Road 37

=== Airports and landing strips ===
- Orleans Airport

== Education ==
- Orleans Community Schools

Orleans Township is served by the Orleans Town & Township Public Library.

== Political districts ==
- Indiana's 9th congressional district
- State House District 62
- State Senate District 44
