= Abydel, Indiana =

- Unincorporated community
- Location within Indiana Location within the United States
- Coordinates: 38°34′14″N 86°33′40″W
- Country: United States
- State: Indiana
- County: Orange
- Township: French Lick
- Elevation: 561 ft (171 m)
- Time zone: UTC-5 (Eastern (EST))
  - Summer (DST): UTC-4 (EDT)
- ZIP code: 47454
- Area codes: 812, 930
- GNIS feature ID: 450618

Abydel (/ˈæbidɛl/ AB-ee-del) is an unincorporated community in French Lick Township, Orange County, in the U.S. state of Indiana.

== History ==
A post office was established at Abydel in 1889, and remained in operation until it was discontinued in 1907. According to Ronald L. Baker, the community may be named for a woman (Abbey Dell). The precise spelling of the community's name is a subject of disagreement among locals with the variants Abbey Dell, Abby Dell, Abbydel, Abbeydel, Abydel, and Abeydell all used. Although "Abydel" is often the most prevalent name used in county, state, and federal government records and on maps, longtime residents and local government sometimes use "Abbeydell" as the preferred spelling.

The population was 75 in 1940.

== See also ==
- Orangeville, Indiana
