= Knute Hill =

American politician (1876–1963)

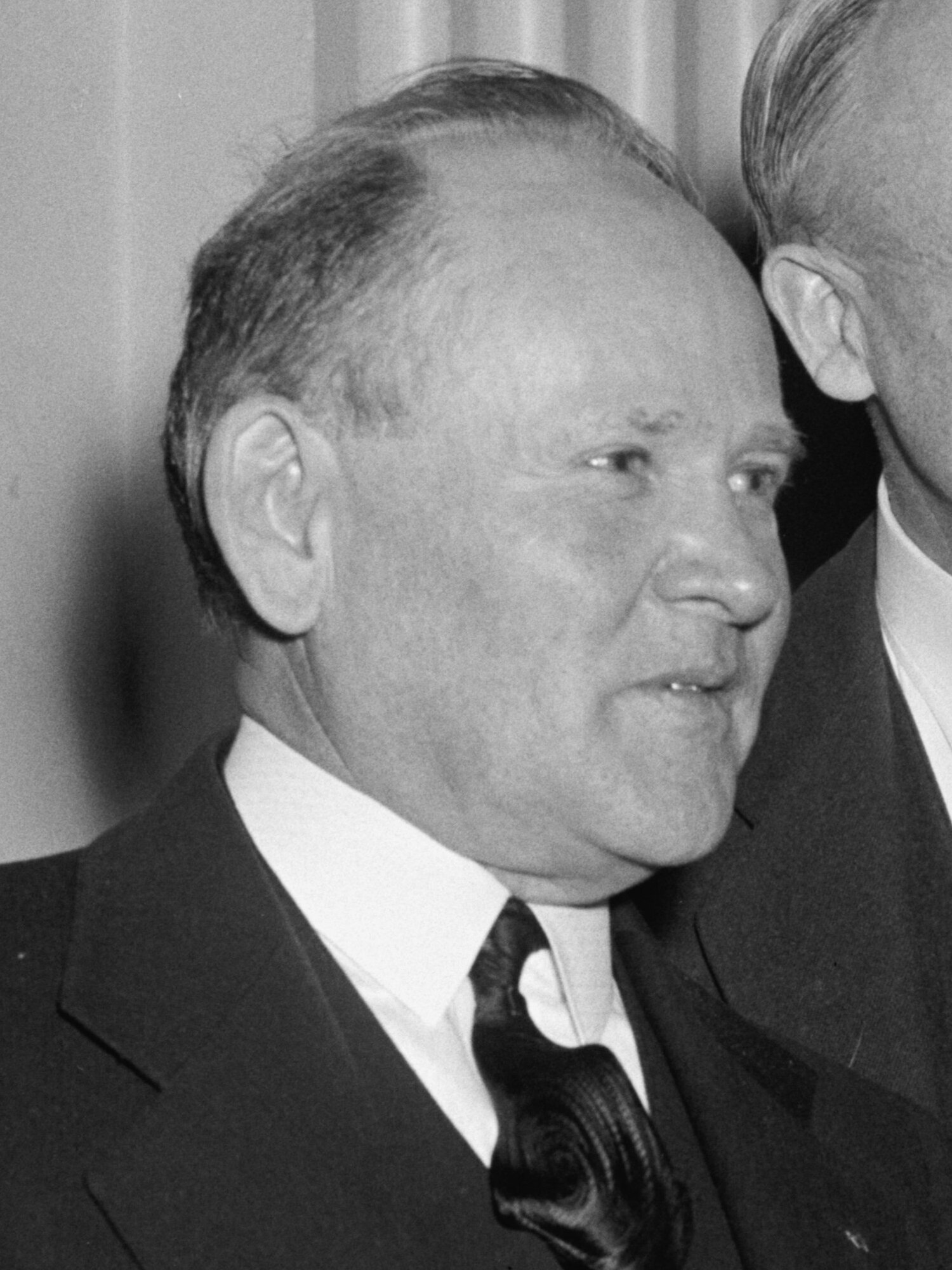
- Hill in 1938

Member of the U.S. House of Representatives from Washington's 4th district
- In office March 4, 1933 – January 3, 1943
- Preceded by: John William Summers
- Succeeded by: Hal Holmes

Member of the Washington House of Representatives from the 58th district
- In office January 10, 1927 – January 9, 1933

Personal details
- Born: July 31, 1876 Creston, Illinois, U.S.
- Died: December 3, 1963 (aged 87) Desert Hot Springs, California, U.S.
- Resting place: Terrace Heights Memorial Park, Yakima, Washington, U.S.
- Party: Farmer–Labor (before 1932); Democratic (after 1932)
- Other political affiliations: Progressive (1948)
- Education: University of Wisconsin–Madison

Knute Hill (July 31, 1876 – December 3, 1963) was a U.S. representative from the state of Washington. He was known by the nickname "the Little Giant".

== Background ==
Born on a farm near Creston, Illinois to Norwegian immigrant parents, Hill moved to De Forest, Wisconsin in 1877 and later to Red Wing, Minnesota in 1889. He attended both Red Wing Seminary and the University of Minnesota at Minneapolis. He graduated from the law department of the University of Wisconsin–Madison in 1906. He was admitted to the bar the same year and practiced law in Milwaukee and Eau Claire, Wisconsin from 1908 to 1910. He moved to Prosser, Washington in 1911. He taught in the public and high schools of Benton County, Washington from 1911 to 1922. He also engaged in agricultural pursuits and was a founding member of the Washington State Grange.

== Political career ==
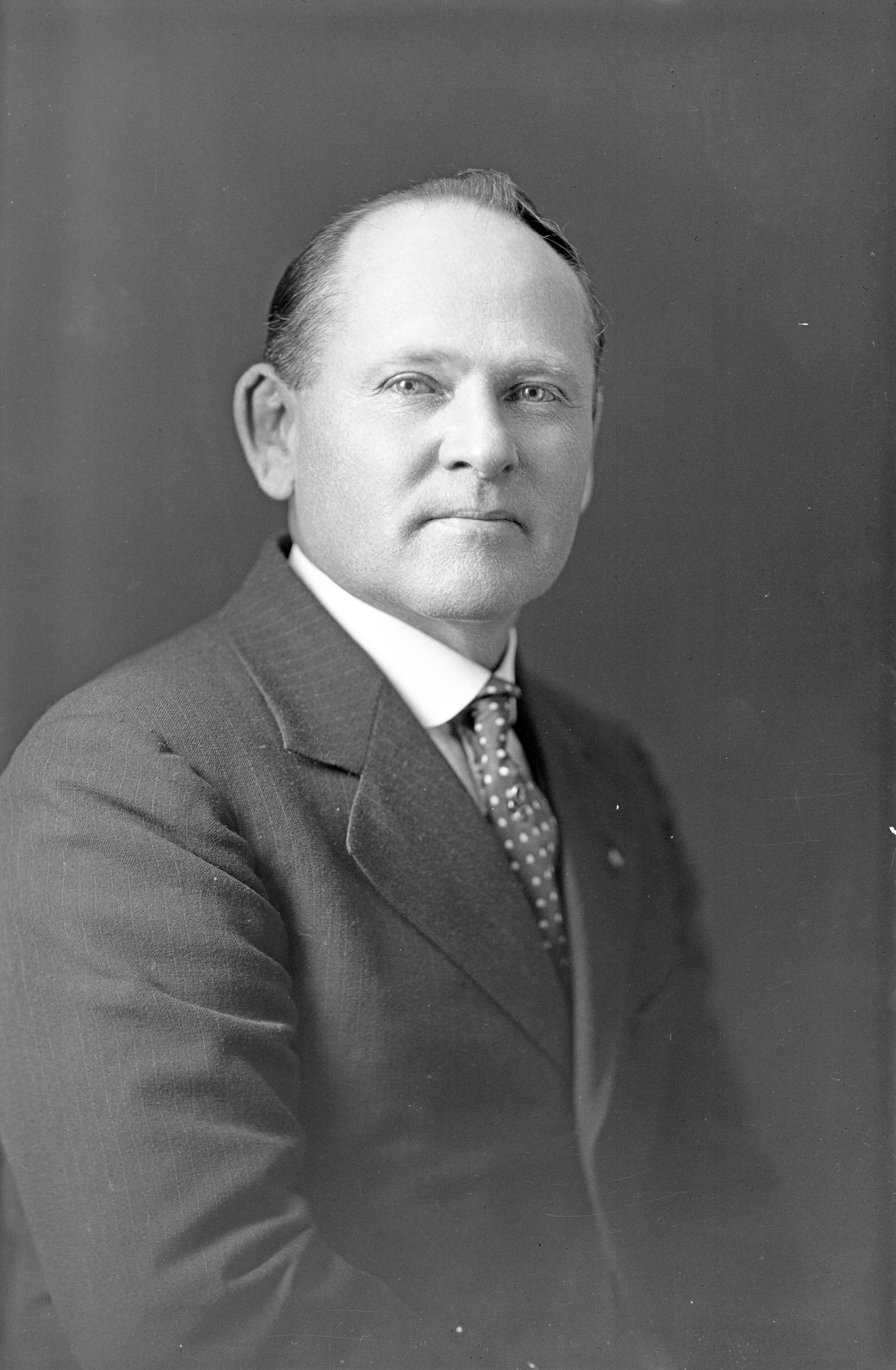
Hill's official State House portrait, 1927

Running as a Farmer-Labor Party candidate in 1920 and 1924, Hill unsuccessfully contested Washington's 4th congressional district. He received over 17% of the vote in the first race, and roughly 13% in the second.

Hill served as a member of the Washington State House of Representatives from 1927 until 1933. Hill was elected as a Democrat to the Seventy-third and to the four succeeding Congresses. He represented the State of Washington's 4th congressional district from March 4, 1933 – January 3, 1943. He was an unsuccessful candidate for reelection in 1942 to the Seventy-eighth Congress.

Hill was Superintendent of the Uintah-Ouray Indian agency at Fort Duchesne, Utah from 1943 until his resignation on March 31, 1944. Hill was a radio commentator in Spokane, Washington from 1944 to 1946. He was an unsuccessful Independent Progressive candidate for election in 1946 to the Eightieth Congress. He was a delegate to the 1948 Progressive National Convention. Hill served as a consulting appraiser and information clerk in the Bureau of Reclamation, Columbia Basin Project, Ephrata, Washington, from March 1949 until his retirement in 1951.

== Later years ==
Knute Hill died of a heart attack in his cabin in Desert Hot Springs, California. He was interred in the Terrace Heights Memorial Park, in Yakima, Washington. Records and papers associated with his political career are maintained at the Washington State University in Pullman, Washington.

U.S. House of Representatives
Preceded by John William Summers	Member of the U.S. House of Representatives from Washington's 4th congressional district 1933–1943	Succeeded by Hal Holmes
