= Ethel, Indiana =

- Unincorporated community
- Location within Indiana Location within the United States
- Coordinates: 38°24′13″N 86°31′28″W
- Country: United States
- State: Indiana
- County: Orange
- Township: Greenfield
- Elevation: 571 ft (174 m)
- Time zone: UTC-5 (Eastern (EST))
  - Summer (DST): UTC-4 (EDT)
- ZIP code: 47118
- Area codes: 812, 930
- GNIS feature ID: 450895

Ethel is an unincorporated community in Greenfield Township, Orange County, in the U.S. state of Indiana.

== History ==
A post office was established at Ethel in 1891, and remained in operation until 1939. Ethel Hollen, an early postmaster, gave the community her name.
