= Leipsic, Indiana =

- Unincorporated community
- Location within Indiana Location within the United States
- Coordinates: 38°40′16″N 86°22′11″W
- Country: United States
- State: Indiana
- County: Orange
- Township: Northeast
- Established: 1851
- Elevation: 722 ft (220 m)
- Time zone: UTC-5 (Eastern (EST))
  - Summer (DST): UTC-4 (EDT)
- ZIP code: 47452
- Area codes: 812, 930
- GNIS feature ID: 437763

Leipsic is an unincorporated community in Northeast Township, Orange County, in the U.S. state of Indiana.

== History ==
The town was laid out in 1851 and was originally called Lancaster. The town was later renamed for the post office, which was apparently named after the German city of the same name.

A post office was established under the Leipsic name in 1852, and remained in operation until it was discontinued in 1980.
