= Lost River, Indiana =

- Unincorporated community
- Location within Indiana Location within the United States
- Coordinates: 38°36′25″N 86°27′05″W
- Country: United States
- State: Indiana
- County: Orange
- Township: Paoli
- Elevation: 637 ft (194 m)
- Time zone: UTC-5 (Eastern (EST))
  - Summer (DST): UTC-4 (EDT)
- ZIP code: 47454
- Area codes: 812, 930
- GNIS feature ID: 451660

Lost River is an unincorporated community in Paoli Township, Orange County, in the U.S. state of Indiana.

== History ==
A post office was established at Lost River in 1837, and remained in operation until 1878. The community took its name from the nearby Lost River.
