= Creston, Illinois =

Creston
- Village
- Location of Creston in Ogle County, Illinois.
- Coordinates: 41°55′51″N 88°57′56″W
- Country: United States
- State: Illinois
- County: Ogle
- Township: Dement

Area
  - Total: 1.15 sq mi (2.97 km^{2})
  - Land: 1.15 sq mi (2.97 km^{2})
  - Water: 0 sq mi (0.00 km^{2})
- Elevation: 906 ft (276 m)

Population (2020)
  - Total: 627
  - Density: 547.2/sq mi (211.26/km^{2})
- Time zone: UTC-6 (CST)
  - Summer (DST): UTC-5 (CDT)
- ZIP code: 60113
- Area code: 815
- FIPS code: 17-17471
- GNIS feature ID: 2398647
- Website: www.villageofcreston.org

Creston is a village in Ogle County, Illinois, United States. The population was 627 at the 2020 census, down from 662 in 2010.

== History ==
Creston was named for its supposed location on the highest point of land between Chicago and the Mississippi River.

== Geography ==
According to the 2010 census, Creston has a total area of 1.14 square miles (2.95 km^{2}), all land.

== Demographics ==
Historical population
Census	Pop.	Note	%±
1880	364		—
1890	329		−9.6%
1900	381		15.8%
1910	323		−15.2%
1920	327		1.2%
1930	315		−3.7%
1940	284		−9.8%
1950	362		27.5%
1960	454		25.4%
1970	595		31.1%
1980	527		−11.4%
1990	535		1.5%
2000	543		1.5%
2010	662		21.9%
2020	627		−5.3%
U.S. Decennial Census

As of the census of 2000, there were 543 people, 195 households, and 154 families residing in the village. The population density was 1,299.3 inhabitants per square mile (501.7/km^{2}). There were 204 housing units at an average density of 488.2 per square mile (188.5/km^{2}). The racial makeup of the village was 95.58% White, 1.10% African American, 0.37% Asian, 1.10% from other races, and 1.84% from two or more races. Hispanic or Latino of any race were 5.34% of the population.

There were 195 households, out of which 37.9% had children under the age of 18 living with them, 64.6% were married couples living together, 10.8% had a female householder with no husband present, and 21.0% were non-families. 19.0% of all households were made up of individuals, and 7.2% had someone living alone who was 65 years of age or older. The average household size was 2.78 and the average family size was 3.18.

In the village, the population was spread out, with 29.8% under the age of 18, 6.4% from 18 to 24, 30.9% from 25 to 44, 21.9% from 45 to 64, and 10.9% who were 65 years of age or older. The median age was 34 years. For every 100 females, there were 96.7 males. For every 100 females age 18 and over, there were 94.4 males.

The median income for a household in the village was $40,000, and the median income for a family was $44,688. Males had a median income of $32,321 versus $23,125 for females. The per capita income for the village was $18,927. About 5.1% of families and 5.2% of the population were below the poverty line, including 6.5% of those under age of 18 and 2.9% of those 65 and over.

== Education ==
It is in the Creston Community Consolidated School District 161 and the Rochelle Township High School District 212.

== Notable person ==
- Knute Hill, congressman from Washington, born in Creston
