= Orleans Historic District =

Historic district in Indiana, United States

- U.S. National Register of Historic Places
- U.S. Historic district
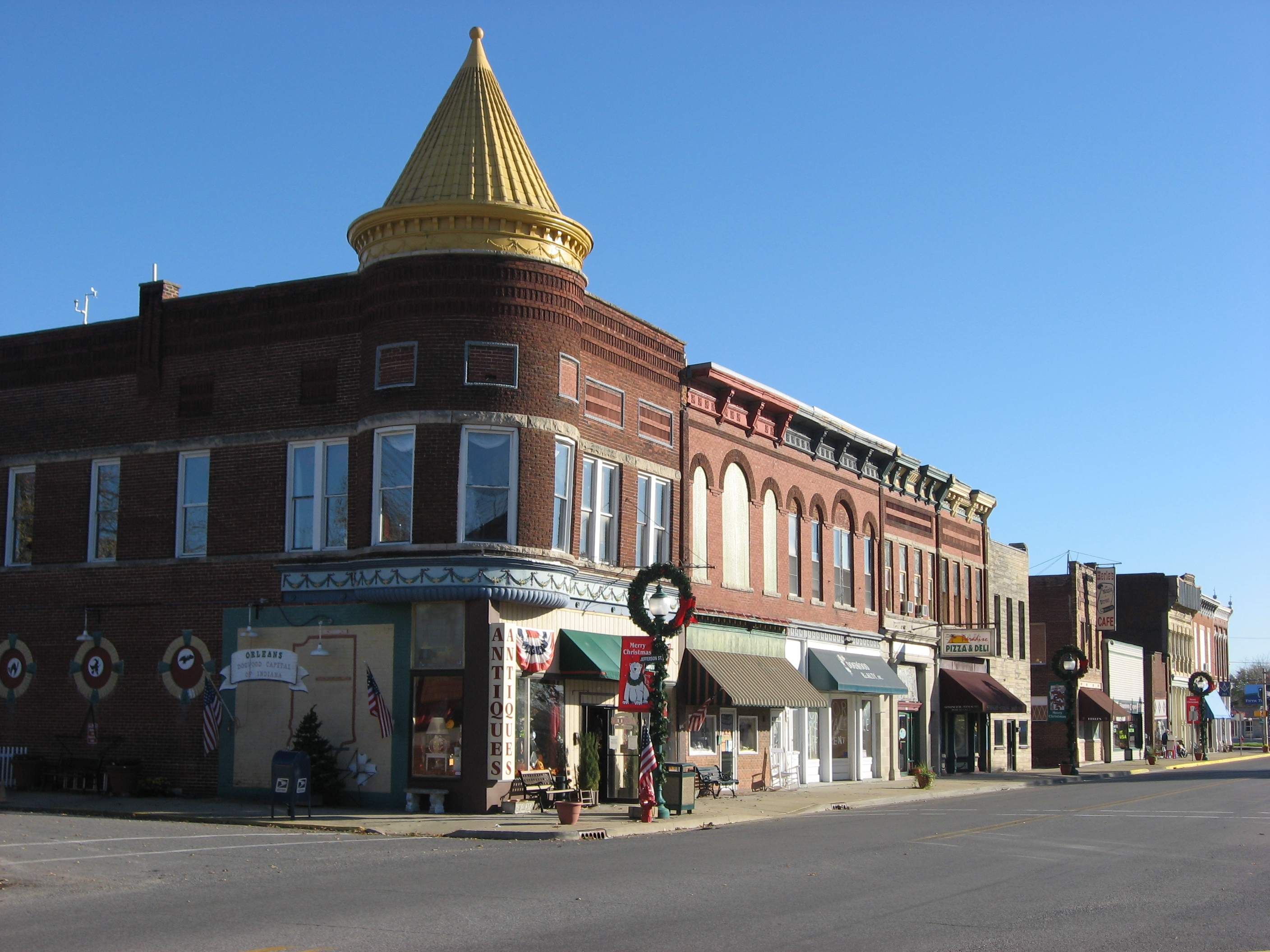
- Orleans Historic District, November 2011

- Location within Indiana Location within the United States
- Location: Roughly bounded by Wilson, Franklin, Harrison & 4th Sts., Orleans, Indiana
- Coordinates: 38°39′42″N 86°27′10″W
- Area: 63 acres (25 ha)
- Built: 1837
- Architect: Cornelius, Dudley "Cap"; et al.
- Architectural style: Late Victorian, Late 19th And 20th Century Revivals
- NRHP reference No.: 09000761
- Added to NRHP: September 24, 2009

Orleans Historic District is a national historic district located at Orleans, Indiana. The district encompasses 163 contributing buildings, 4 contributing sites, and 10 contributing objects in the central business district and surrounding residential sections of Orleans. It developed between about 1837 and 1958, and includes notable examples of Italianate, Queen Anne, Second Empire, Gothic Revival, Colonial Revival, Classical Revival, Tudor Revival, and Bungalow / American Craftsman style architecture. Notable buildings include the Cornelius-Osborn Building (1927), Magner-Lindsey Hotel (1872, c. 1901, c. 1909), Roberts Building / Herle's Restaurant (c. 1901), Presbyterian Church (c. 1845), Methodist Episcopal Church (1915), Bowles Building (1889), Hollowell Brothers Building (1897–1898), Orleans Public Library (1915), and Ashland Service Station (1955).

It was listed on the National Register of Historic Places in 2009.
