= Millersburg, Orange County, Indiana =

Millersburg
- Unincorporated community
- Location within Indiana Location within the United States
- Coordinates: 38°33′26″N 86°20′08″W
- Country: United States
- State: Indiana
- County: Orange
- Township: Stampers Creek
- Elevation: 722 ft (220 m)
- Time zone: UTC-5 (Eastern (EST))
  - Summer (DST): UTC-4 (EDT)
- ZIP code: 47454
- Area codes: 812, 930
- GNIS feature ID: 451224

Millersburg is an unincorporated community in Stampers Creek Township, Orange County, in the U.S. state of Indiana. It has also been known as Stampers Creek.

== Geography ==
Millersburg/Stampers Creek is located 8 miles (13 km) from Paoli, Indiana, the county seat.

== History ==
Millersburg was named for Greenup Miller, who opened a store there in about 1833. A number of other mercantiles opened in the area, among them the Mahan store in 1840.

The post office in Millersburg was named Stampers Creek, and opened around 1851, with M. Stone named as postmaster. After Stone were George C. Duncan, then Nancy R. Duncan, then Ulrich Sailer, and then Dr. James Baker. During this era, the Davis and Dillard blacksmith shop also operated.

The population (under the name Stampers Creek) was 80 in 1890, 80 in 1920, and was 50 in 1940.

The Stampers Creek post office closed in 1905.

== See also ==
- Pearsontown, Indiana
