= Jenkins Place =

- U.S. National Register of Historic Places
- U.S. Historic district
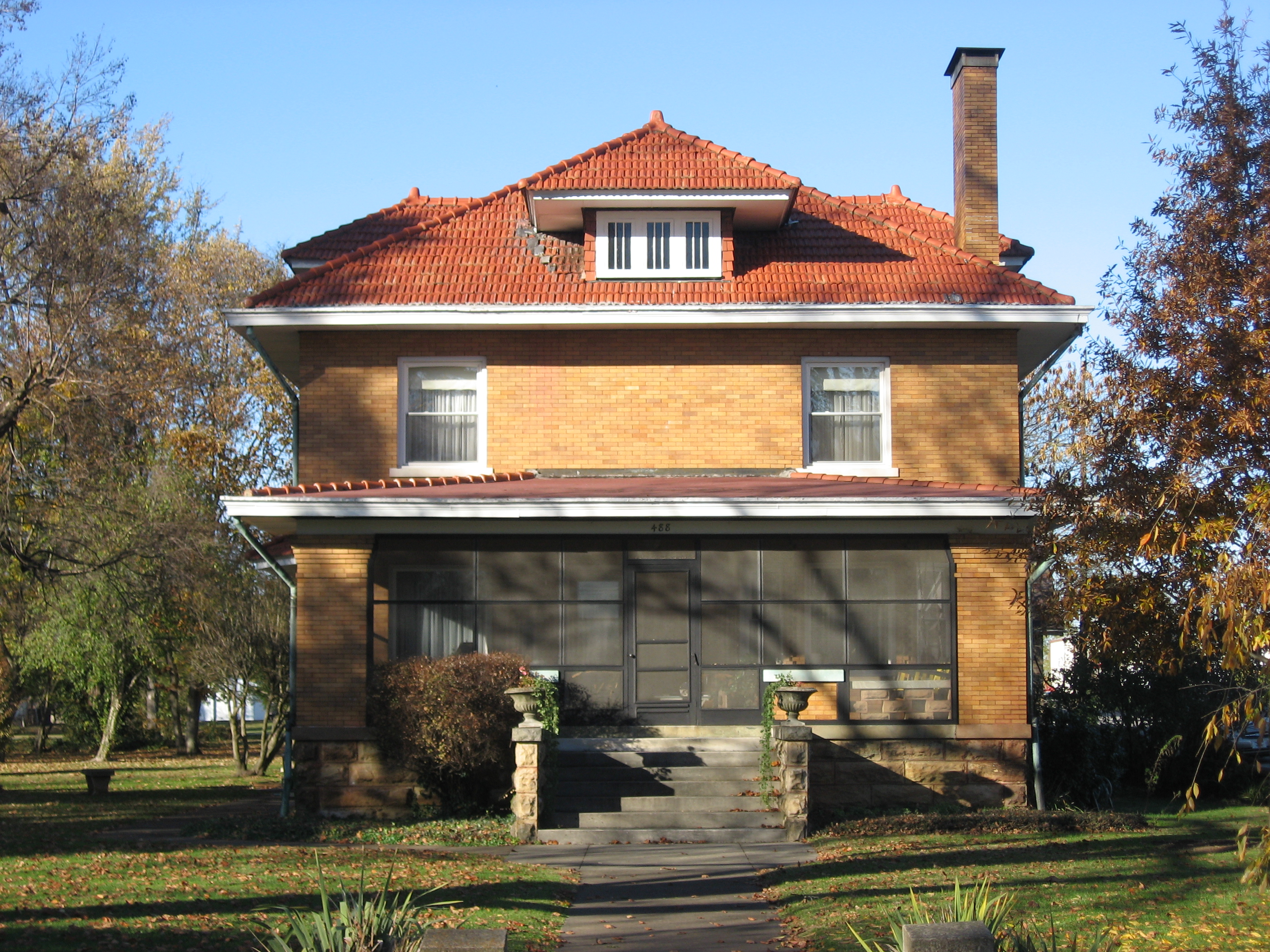
- Rock Jenkins House, November 2011

- Location within Indiana Location within the United States
- Location: 448-488 Liberty Rd., Orleans, Indiana
- Coordinates: 38°39′25″N 86°26′52″W
- Area: 4 acres (1.6 ha)
- Built: 1908, 1912
- Architect: Chatham, Ralph C.; Ochs, Charles
- Architectural style: Prairie School, Bungalow/craftsman
- NRHP reference No.: 10000127
- Added to NRHP: March 31, 2010

Jenkins Place are two historic homes and, together, a national historic district located at Orleans, Indiana. The Rock and Lucie Jenkins House was built in 1908, and is a 2 1/2-story, American Foursquare brick dwelling., with Prairie School influences. The Ralph and Margaret Jenkins House was built in 1912, and is a 1 1/2-story, Bungalow / American Craftsman style frame dwelling. It has a steeply pitched roof covered in green tile. Other contributing resources include a garage, concrete corner posts, fencing, former goldfish pond, and two cisterns.

It was listed on the National Register of Historic Places in 2010.
