= Dement Township, Illinois =

Dement Township
- Township
- Location in Ogle County
- Coordinates: 41°55′56″N 88°59′49″W
- Country: United States
- State: Illinois
- County: Ogle
- Established: September 11, 1855

Area
  - Total: 35 sq mi (91 km^{2})
  - Land: 34.95 sq mi (90.5 km^{2})
  - Water: 0.05 sq mi (0.13 km^{2}) 0.14%
- Elevation: 860 ft (262 m)

Population (2010)
  - Estimate (2016): 957
  - Density: 28.3/sq mi (10.9/km^{2})
- Time zone: UTC-6 (CST)
  - Summer (DST): UTC-5 (CDT)
- ZIP codes: 60113, 61068
- FIPS code: 17-141-19382

Dement Township is one of twenty-four townships in Ogle County, Illinois, USA. As of the 2010 census, its population was 989 and it contained 409 housing units.

== History ==
Dement Township was formed from the east half of Flagg Township on September 11, 1855. The township was named for John Dement (1804–1883), a politician and militia commander from Illinois.

== Geography ==
According to the 2010 census, the township has a total area of 35 square miles (91 km^{2}), of which 34.95 square miles (90.5 km^{2}) (or 99.86%) is land and 0.05 square miles (0.13 km^{2}) (or 0.14%) is water. It contains the village of Creston, and the east side of the city of Rochelle.

=== Cemeteries ===
The township contains Woodlawn Cemetery.

== Demographics ==
Historical population
Census	Pop.	Note	%±
2016 (est.)	957
U.S. Decennial Census

== Political districts ==
- Illinois's 16th congressional district
- State House District 70
- State Senate District 35
