= Bromer, Indiana =

- Unincorporated community
- Location within Indiana Location within the United States
- Coordinates: 38°35′37″N 86°20′09″W
- Country: United States
- State: Indiana
- County: Orange
- Township: Northeast
- Elevation: 745 ft (227 m)
- Time zone: UTC-5 (Eastern (EST))
  - Summer (DST): UTC-4 (EDT)
- ZIP code: 47452
- Area codes: 812, 930
- GNIS feature ID: 450713

Bromer is an unincorporated community in Northeast Township, Orange County, in the U.S. state of Indiana.

== History ==
A post office was established at Bromer in 1884, and remained in operation until it was discontinued in 1904. According to Ronald L. Baker, the community's name is probably an acronym in tribute to residents Boyd, Roll, Oldham, McCoy, Ellis, and Reid.
