= Woodlawn Grove, Indiana =

- Unincorporated community
- Location within Indiana Location within the United States
- Coordinates: 38°34′41″N 86°27′29″W
- Country: United States
- State: Indiana
- County: Orange
- Township: Paoli
- Elevation: 761 ft (232 m)
- Time zone: UTC-5 (Eastern (EST))
  - Summer (DST): UTC-4 (EDT)
- ZIP code: 47454
- Area codes: 812, 930
- GNIS feature ID: 449949

Woodlawn Grove is an unincorporated community in Paoli Township, Orange County, in the U.S. state of Indiana.
