= Newton Stewart, Indiana =

- Unincorporated town
- Location within Indiana Location within the United States
- Coordinates: 38°24′21″N 86°37′15″W
- Country: United States
- State: Indiana
- County: Orange
- Time zone: UTC-5 (Eastern (EST))
  - Summer (DST): UTC-4 (EDT)
- GNIS feature ID: 452173

Newton Stewart was an unincorporated town in Orange County, in the U.S. state of Indiana. The town site lies under the waters of Patoka Lake.

== History ==
Newton Stewart was platted in 1839 by William and Henry Stewart. According to Ronald L. Baker, the community's name may also allude to Newton Stewart, in Scotland. A post office was established at Newton Stewart in 1850, and remained in operation until it was discontinued in 1973. The town was one of several communities inundated by the creation of the Patoka Lake reservoir in the late 1970s.
