= Greenfield Township, Orange County, Indiana =

Greenfield Township
- Township
- Location in Orange County
- Coordinates: 38°26′45″N 86°30′39″W
- Country: United States
- State: Indiana
- County: Orange

Government
  - Type: Indiana township

Area
  - Total: 43.14 sq mi (111.7 km^{2})
  - Land: 41.22 sq mi (106.8 km^{2})
  - Water: 1.92 sq mi (5.0 km^{2}) 4.45%
- Elevation: 673 ft (205 m)

Population (2020)
  - Total: 746
  - Density: 18.1/sq mi (6.99/km^{2})
- Time zone: UTC-5 (Eastern (EST))
  - Summer (DST): UTC-4 (EDT)
- ZIP codes: 47118, 47140, 47175, 47432, 47454
- Area codes: 812, 930
- GNIS feature ID: 453352

Greenfield Township is one of ten townships in Orange County, Indiana, United States. As of the 2020 census, its population was 746 and it contained 494 housing units.

Historical population
Census	Pop.	Note	%±
1890	1,444		—
1900	1,383		−4.2%
1910	1,167		−15.6%
1920	1,058		−9.3%
1930	828		−21.7%
1940	863		4.2%
1950	601		−30.4%
1960	459		−23.6%
1970	338		−26.4%
1980	469		38.8%
1990	418		−10.9%
2000	559		33.7%
2010	730		30.6%
2020	746		2.2%
Source: US Decennial Census

== Geography ==
According to the 2010 census, the township has a total area of 43.14 square miles (111.7 km^{2}), of which 41.22 square miles (106.8 km^{2}) (or 95.55%) is land and 1.92 square miles (5.0 km^{2}) (or 4.45%) is water.

=== Unincorporated towns ===
- Ethel at 38.403669°N 86.524431°W
- Fargo at 38.400058°N 86.483318°W
- Greenbrier at 38.463112°N 86.555822°W
- Youngs Creek at 38.476723°N 86.495543°W

(This list is based on USGS data and may include former settlements.)

=== Major highways ===
- Indiana State Road 37

=== Lakes ===
- Tucker Lake

== School districts ==
- Paoli Community School Corporation

== Political districts ==
- Indiana's 9th congressional district
- State House District 62
- State Senate District 48
