= Pumpkin Center, Orange County, Indiana =

Pumpkin Center
- Unincorporated community
- Location within Indiana Location within the United States
- Coordinates: 38°35′22″N 86°21′52″W
- Country: United States
- State: Indiana
- County: Orange
- Township: Northeast
- Elevation: 702 ft (214 m)
- Time zone: UTC-5 (Eastern (EST))
  - Summer (DST): UTC-4 (EDT)
- ZIP code: 47452
- Area codes: 812, 930
- GNIS feature ID: 451371

Pumpkin Center is an unincorporated community in Northeast Township, Orange County, in the U.S. state of Indiana.

== History ==
Pumpkin Center (locally referred to as "Punkin Center") is an unincorporated community along a single lane stretch of Tater Road in Orange County, Indiana.

The community was based around Gray's General Store. Opened in 1922 by Add and Mabel Gray, the store was the foundation of Pumpkin Center. Operating until 1967, the store later became a museum of curiosities displaying items the Grays had collected over their lives in rural Southern Indiana. The museum was kept open by Mabel Gray until 2006.

The community was likely named for pumpkins grown here by Add Gray's father. A documentary about Pumpkin Center was filmed in the early 1980s. Upon Mabel's death, the Gray's lifelong savings and auction proceeds were donated to area hospitals and charities.
