= Stampers Creek =

Stream in Orange County, Indiana, U.S.

Coordinates: 38°35′00″N 86°23′12″W

Stampers Creek is a stream in Orange County, in the U.S. state of Indiana.

Stampers Creek was named for an obscure pioneer named Stamper.
