= French Lick Township, Orange County, Indiana =

French Lick Township
- Township
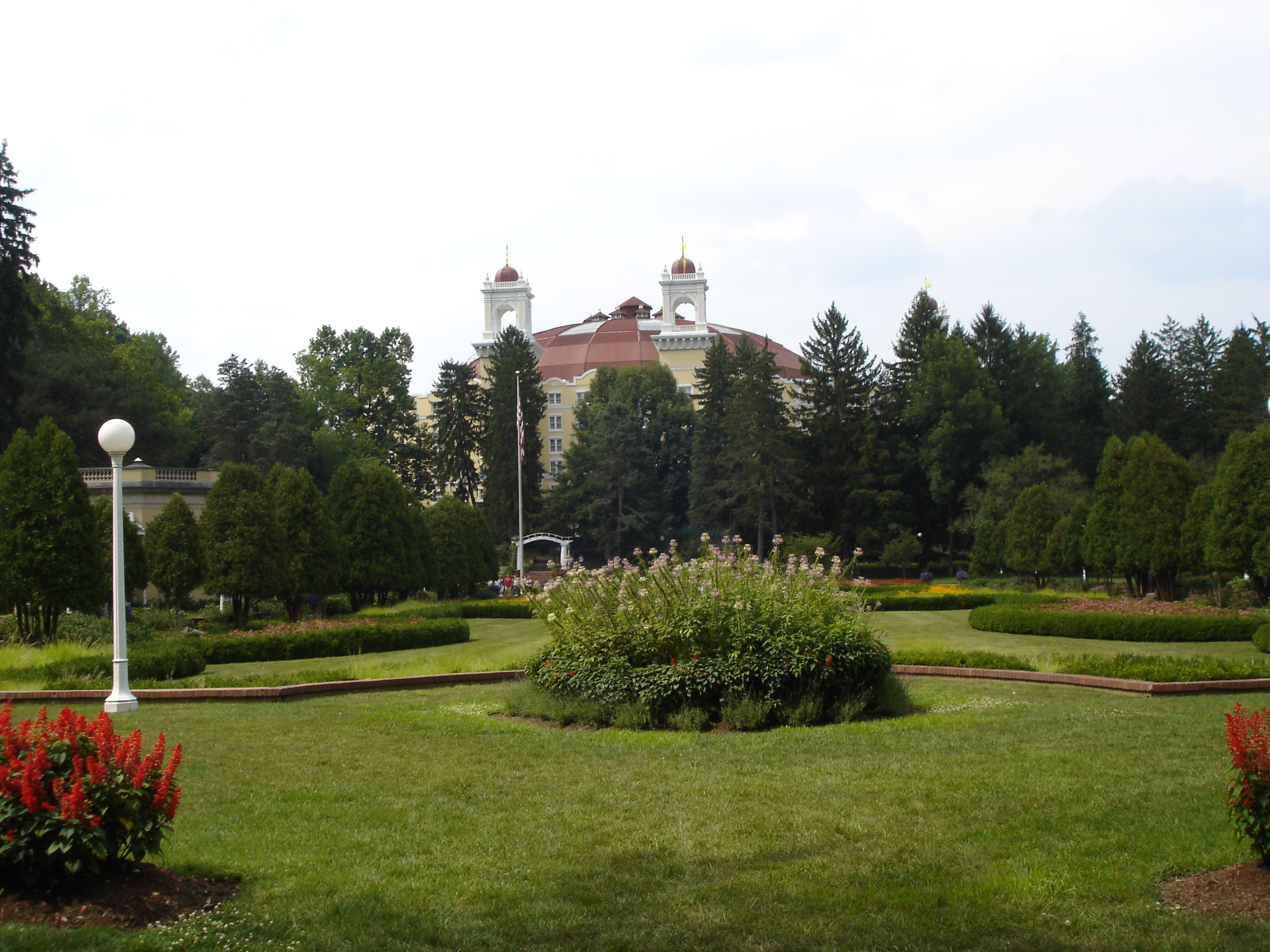
- West Baden Springs, in French Lick Township

- Location in Orange County
- Coordinates: 38°32′40″N 86°36′41″W
- Country: United States
- State: Indiana
- County: Orange

Government
  - Type: Indiana township

Area
  - Total: 54.07 sq mi (140.0 km^{2})
  - Land: 53.85 sq mi (139.5 km^{2})
  - Water: 0.22 sq mi (0.57 km^{2}) 0.41%
- Elevation: 482 ft (147 m)

Population (2020)
  - Total: 4,576
  - Density: 84.98/sq mi (32.81/km^{2})
- Time zone: UTC-5 (Eastern (EST))
  - Summer (DST): UTC-4 (EDT)
- ZIP codes: 47432, 47454, 47469
- Area codes: 812, 930
- GNIS feature ID: 453319

French Lick Township is one of ten townships in Orange County, Indiana, United States. As of the 2020 census, its population was 4,576 and it contained 2,227 housing units.

Historical population
Census	Pop.	Note	%±
1890	1,869		—
1900	3,237		73.2%
1910	4,935		52.5%
1920	5,144		4.2%
1930	6,133		19.2%
1940	5,370		−12.4%
1950	5,140		−4.3%
1960	4,991		−2.9%
1970	4,896		−1.9%
1980	5,184		5.9%
1990	4,902		−5.4%
2000	4,767		−2.8%
2010	4,699		−1.4%
2020	4,576		−2.6%
Source: US Decennial Census

== History ==
French Lick Township was named after French Lick Creek.

== Geography ==
According to the 2010 census, the township has a total area of 54.07 square miles (140.0 km^{2}), of which 53.85 square miles (139.5 km^{2}) (or 99.59%) is land and 0.22 square miles (0.57 km^{2}) (or 0.41%) is water.

=== Cities, towns, villages ===
- French Lick
- West Baden Springs

=== Unincorporated towns ===
- Abydel at 38.57061°N 86.561101°W
- Prospect at 38.57811°N 86.614159°W

(This list is based on USGS data and may include former settlements.)

=== Cemeteries ===
The township contains these three cemeteries: Mount Lebanon, Pythian and Sulphur Creek.

=== Major highways ===
- U.S. Route 150
- Indiana State Road 56
- Indiana State Road 145

=== Airports and landing strips ===
- French Lick Municipal Airport

== School districts ==
The entire township is in the Springs Valley Community School Corporation.

== Political districts ==
- Indiana's 8th congressional district
- State House District 62
- State Senate District 48
