= Paoli Township, Orange County, Indiana =

Paoli Township
- Township
- Location in Orange County
- Coordinates: 38°33′21″N 86°27′31″W
- Country: United States
- State: Indiana
- County: Orange

Government
  - Type: Indiana township

Area
  - Total: 63.37 sq mi (164.1 km^{2})
  - Land: 63.25 sq mi (163.8 km^{2})
  - Water: 0.12 sq mi (0.31 km^{2}) 0.19%
- Elevation: 686 ft (209 m)

Population (2020)
  - Total: 6,038
  - Density: 95.46/sq mi (36.86/km^{2})
- Time zone: UTC-5 (Eastern (EST))
  - Summer (DST): UTC-4 (EDT)
- ZIP codes: 47452, 47454, 47469
- Area codes: 812, 930
- GNIS feature ID: 453705

Paoli Township is one of ten townships in Orange County, Indiana, United States. As of the 2020 census, its population was 6,038 and it contained 2,630 housing units.

Historical population
Census	Pop.	Note	%±
1890	2,719		—
1900	3,047		12.1%
1910	2,785		−8.6%
1920	3,066		10.1%
1930	3,602		17.5%
1940	4,020		11.6%
1950	4,448		10.6%
1960	4,805		8.0%
1970	5,151		7.2%
1980	5,780		12.2%
1990	5,624		−2.7%
2000	5,890		4.7%
2010	6,031		2.4%
2020	6,038		0.1%
Source: US Decennial Census

== History ==
Thomas Elwood Lindley House and Newberry Friends Meeting House are listed on the National Register of Historic Places.

== Geography ==
According to the 2010 census, the township has a total area of 63.37 square miles (164.1 km^{2}), of which 63.25 square miles (163.8 km^{2}) (or 99.81%) is land and 0.12 square miles (0.31 km^{2}) (or 0.19%) is water.

=== Cities, towns, villages ===
- Paoli

=== Unincorporated towns ===
- Chambersburg at 38.518112°N 86.392207°W
- Lost River at 38.606999°N 86.451377°W
- Stampers Creek at 38.558389°N 86.383319°W
- Woodlawn Grove at 38.578111°N 86.458043°W

(This list is based on USGS data and may include former settlements.)

=== Cemeteries ===
The township contains these four cemeteries: Lewis, Paoli Community, Scott and Springer.

=== Major highways ===
- U.S. Route 150
- Indiana State Road 37
- Indiana State Road 56

=== Airports and landing strips ===
- Paoli Municipal Airport

== Education ==
- Paoli Community School Corporation
- Throop Elementary School (Grades K–6)
- Paoli Junior-Senior High School (Grades 7–12)

Paoli Township residents may obtain a free library card from the Paoli Public Library in the Town of Paoli.

== Political districts ==
- Indiana's 9th congressional district
- State House District 62
- State Senate District 44
