= Hal Holmes =

American politician (1902–1977)

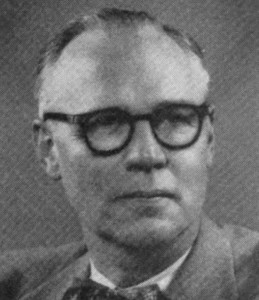

Member of the U.S. House of Representatives from Washington's 4th district
- In office January 3, 1943 – January 3, 1959
- Preceded by: Knute Hill
- Succeeded by: Catherine D. May

Personal details
- Born: Otis Halbert Holmes; February 22, 1902 Cresco, Iowa, U.S.
- Died: July 27, 1977 (aged 75) Yakima, Washington, U.S.
- Party: Republican
- Relations: Dudley C. Haskell (grandfather)
- Education: Whitman College; Columbia University

Otis Halbert Holmes (February 22, 1902 – July 27, 1977) was a U.S. representative from Washington state, serving a total of eight consecutive terms, from 1943 to 1959. He did not stand for re-election in 1958, retiring to his ranch.

Starting his career as a teacher and academic, Holmes also became a livestock rancher in Eastern Washington. He joined the Republican Party and entered politics. He was a grandson of U.S. Representative Dudley C. Haskell (R-KS).

== Early life and education ==
Born in Cresco, Iowa, Holmes moved in 1915 with his parents and family to Walla Walla, Washington, where he attended the public schools. He graduated from Whitman College, also in Walla Walla, in 1923. He attended graduate school at Columbia University, New York City, where he earned his degree in 1927.

== Career ==
Holmes returned to Washington, where he first taught economics at Ellensburg High School in 1924. He taught in 1925 at what became Central Washington College of Education at Ellensburg. It was first established as a normal school for the training of elementary school teachers.

After completing his graduate degree, Holmes taught at Columbia University in 1928 and 1929. He returned to the Pacific Northwest, teaching at Central Washington College of Education from 1930 to 1942. From 1934 to 1942 Holmes was also a livestock rancher and operator.

Holmes was elected in 1942 as a Republican to the Seventy-eighth and to the seven succeeding Congresses (January 3, 1943 - January 3, 1959). Holmes voted in favor of the Civil Rights Act of 1957.

He was not a candidate for reelection in 1958 to the Eighty-sixth Congress.

Holmes died in Yakima, Washington, July 27, 1977, and was buried in Terrace Heights Memorial Park.

U.S. House of Representatives
Preceded by Knute Hill	Member of the U.S. House of Representatives from Washington's 4th congressional district 1943–1959	Succeeded by Catherine D. May
