= Northeast Township, Orange County, Indiana =

Northeast Township
- Township
- Location in Orange County
- Coordinates: 38°37′01″N 86°22′31″W
- Country: United States
- State: Indiana
- County: Orange

Government
  - Type: Indiana township

Area
  - Total: 28.7 sq mi (74 km^{2})
  - Land: 28.63 sq mi (74.2 km^{2})
  - Water: 0.08 sq mi (0.21 km^{2}) 0.28%
- Elevation: 702 ft (214 m)

Population (2020)
  - Total: 493
  - Density: 17.2/sq mi (6.65/km^{2})
- Time zone: UTC-5 (Eastern (EST))
  - Summer (DST): UTC-4 (EDT)
- ZIP codes: 47108, 47452
- Area codes: 812, 930
- GNIS feature ID: 452423

Northeast Township is one of ten townships in Orange County, Indiana, United States. As of the 2020 census, its population was 493 and it contained 222 housing units.

Historical population
Census	Pop.	Note	%±
1890	898		—
1900	965		7.5%
1910	835		−13.5%
1920	761		−8.9%
1930	702		−7.8%
1940	743		5.8%
1950	655		−11.8%
1960	700		6.9%
1970	626		−10.6%
1980	594		−5.1%
1990	548		−7.7%
2000	578		5.5%
2010	549		−5.0%
2020	493		−10.2%
Source: US Decennial Census

== Geography ==
According to the 2010 census, the township has a total area of 28.7 square miles (74 km^{2}), of which 28.63 square miles (74.2 km^{2}) (or 99.76%) is land and 0.08 square miles (0.21 km^{2}) (or 0.28%) is water.

=== Unincorporated towns ===
- Bromer at 38.593667°N 86.335818°W
- Leipsic at 38.671165°N 86.369709°W
- Pumpkin Center at 38.589500°N 86.36443°W

(This list is based on USGS data and may include former settlements.)

=== Cemeteries ===
The township contains these four cemeteries: Edward, Freed, Freedom and Trimble.

=== Major highways ===
- Indiana State Road 60

== School districts ==
- Orleans Community Schools

== Political districts ==
- Indiana's 9th congressional district
- State House District 62
- State Senate District 44
