= Prospect, Indiana =

- Census designated place
- Location within Indiana Location within the United States
- Coordinates: 38°35′07″N 86°36′49″W
- Country: United States
- State: Indiana
- County: Orange
- Township: French Lick
- Elevation: 568 ft (173 m)
- Time zone: UTC-5 (Eastern (EST))
  - Summer (DST): UTC-4 (EDT)
- ZIP code: 47469
- Area codes: 812, 930
- GNIS feature ID: 2830485

Prospect is a census designated place (CDP) in French Lick Township, Orange County, in the U.S. state of Indiana.

== History ==
The community's original name was New Prospect. New Prospect was laid out in 1836.

A post office was established under the name New Prospect in 1851, but was soon discontinued, in 1853.

== Demographics ==
The United States Census Bureau defined Prospect as a census designated place in the 2022 American Community Survey.
