= Southeast Township, Orange County, Indiana =

Southeast Township
- Township
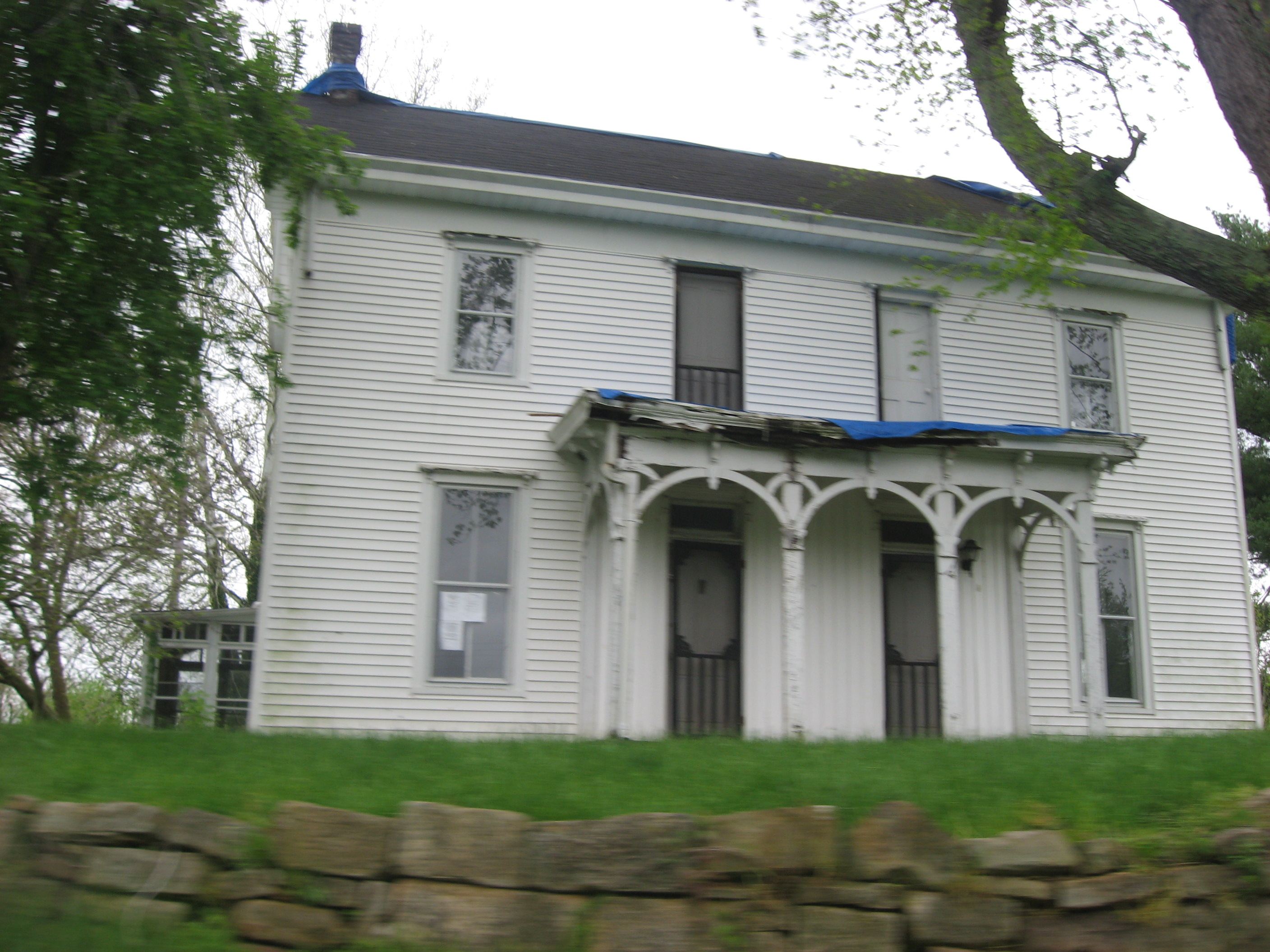
- An I-house at Valeene

- Location in Orange County
- Coordinates: 38°26′40″N 86°22′59″W
- Country: United States
- State: Indiana
- County: Orange

Government
  - Type: Indiana township

Area
  - Total: 53.33 sq mi (138.1 km^{2})
  - Land: 53.21 sq mi (137.8 km^{2})
  - Water: 0.12 sq mi (0.31 km^{2}) 0.23%
- Elevation: 660 ft (200 m)

Population (2020)
  - Total: 1,541
  - Density: 28.96/sq mi (11.18/km^{2})
- Time zone: UTC-5 (Eastern (EST))
  - Summer (DST): UTC-4 (EDT)
- ZIP codes: 47125, 47140, 47452, 47454
- Area codes: 812, 930
- GNIS feature ID: 453856

Southeast Township is one of ten townships in Orange County, Indiana, United States. As of the 2020 census, its population was 1,541 and it contained 725 housing units.

Historical population
Census	Pop.	Note	%±
1890	1,789		—
1900	1,840		2.9%
1910	1,416		−23.0%
1920	1,222		−13.7%
1930	997		−18.4%
1940	1,242		24.6%
1950	1,160		−6.6%
1960	1,212		4.5%
1970	1,262		4.1%
1980	1,435		13.7%
1990	1,536		7.0%
2000	1,544		0.5%
2010	1,603		3.8%
2020	1,541		−3.9%
Source: US Decennial Census

== History ==
Southeast Township was named from its position in the southeastern corner of Orange County.

== Geography ==
According to the 2010 census, the township has a total area of 53.33 square miles (138.1 km^{2}), of which 53.21 square miles (137.8 km^{2}) (or 99.77%) is land and 0.12 square miles (0.31 km^{2}) (or 0.23%) is water.

=== Unincorporated towns ===
- Bacon at 38.410614°N 86.433317°W
- Pearsontown at 38.420892°N 86.39165°W
- Rego at 38.485058°N 86.317760°W
- Valeene at 38.438947°N 86.397206°W

(This list is based on USGS data and may include former settlements.)

=== Cemeteries ===
The township contains Little Africa Cemetery.

=== Major highways ===
- U.S. Route 150
- Indiana State Road 37

== School districts ==
- Paoli Community School Corporation

== Political districts ==
- Indiana's 9th congressional district
- State House District 62
- State Senate District 44
