= Chambersburg, Indiana =

- Unincorporated community
- Location within Indiana Location within the United States
- Coordinates: 38°31′05″N 86°23′32″W
- Country: United States
- State: Indiana
- County: Orange
- Township: Paoli
- Elevation: 656 ft (200 m)
- Time zone: UTC-5 (Eastern (EST))
  - Summer (DST): UTC-4 (EDT)
- ZIP code: 47454
- Area codes: 812, 930
- GNIS feature ID: 450763

Chambersburg is an unincorporated community in Paoli Township, Orange County, in the U.S. state of Indiana.

== History ==
Chambersburg was laid out in 1840 by Samuel Chambers, who named it for himself. The community was a station on the Underground Railroad.

A post office was established at Chambersburg in 1849, and remained in operation until it was discontinued in 1912.
