= Orleans, Indiana =

- Town
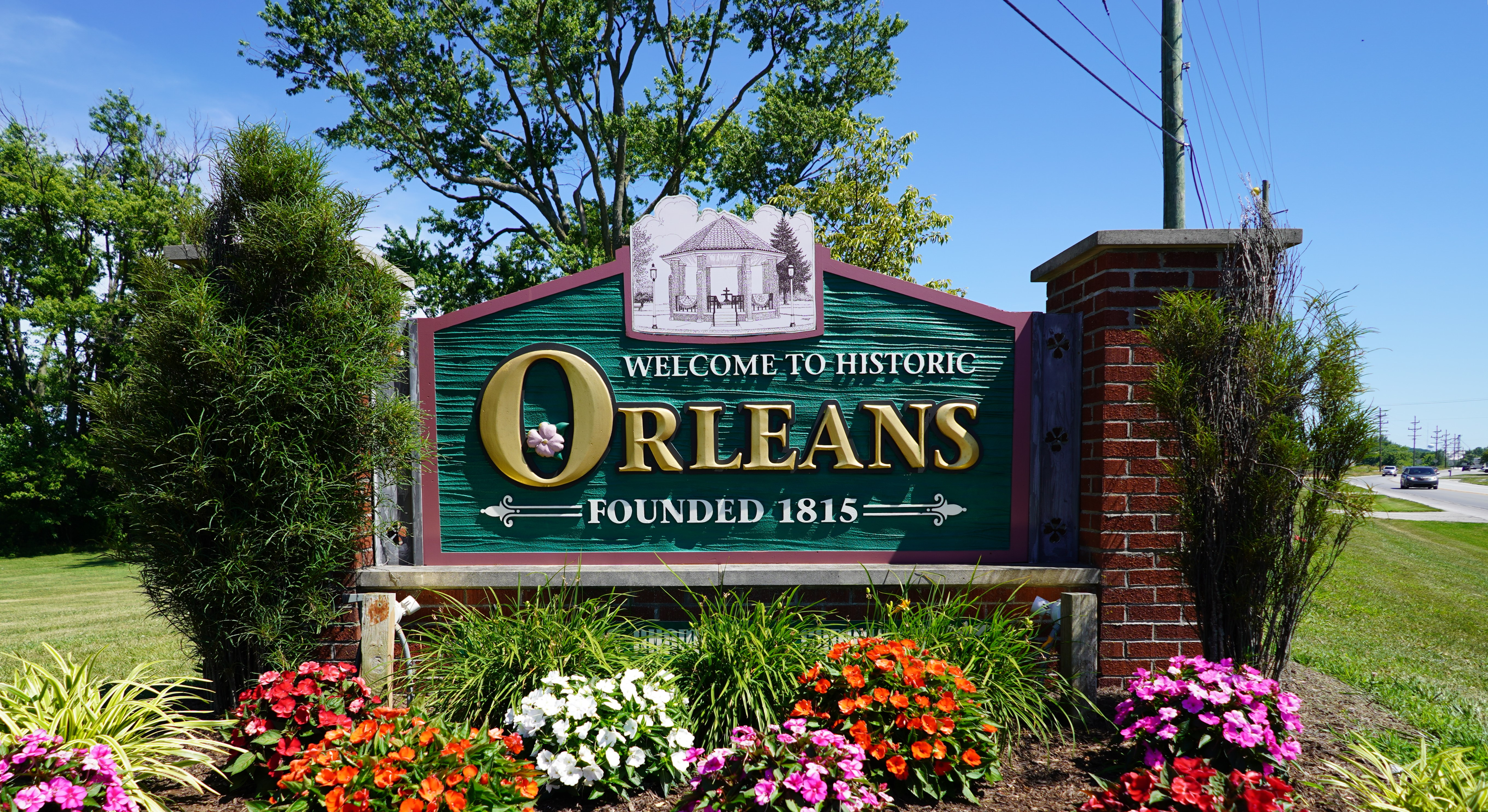
- Orleans, Indiana
- Motto: "Dogwood Capital Of Indiana"
- Location of Orleans in Orange County, Indiana.
- Coordinates: 38°39′42″N 86°27′06″W
- Country: United States
- State: Indiana
- County: Orange
- Township: Orleans

Area
  - Total: 1.71 sq mi (4.43 km^{2})
  - Land: 1.71 sq mi (4.43 km^{2})
  - Water: 0 sq mi (0.00 km^{2})
- Elevation: 633 ft (193 m)

Population (2020)
  - Total: 2,108
  - Density: 1,233.2/sq mi (476.13/km^{2})
- Time zone: UTC-5 (Eastern (EST))
  - Summer (DST): UTC-4 (EDT)
- ZIP code: 47452
- Area codes: 812, 930
- FIPS code: 18-57024
- GNIS feature ID: 2396837
- Website: www.town.orleans.in.us

Orleans is a town in Orleans Township, Orange County, in the U.S. state of Indiana. As of the 2020 census, Orleans had a population of 2,108.

== History ==
Orleans was platted in 1815, and named in commemoration of the Battle of New Orleans. A post office has been in operation at Orleans since 1823.

Jenkins Place and Orleans Historic District are listed on the National Register of Historic Places.

== Geography ==
According to the 2010 census, Orleans has a total area of 1.71 square miles (4.43 km^{2}), all land.

== Demographics ==
Historical population
Census	Pop.	Note	%±
1870	905		—
1880	812		−10.3%
1890	857		5.5%
1900	1,236		44.2%
1910	1,367		10.6%
1920	1,408		3.0%
1930	1,422		1.0%
1940	1,428		0.4%
1950	1,531		7.2%
1960	1,659		8.4%
1970	1,834		10.5%
1980	2,161		17.8%
1990	2,083		−3.6%
2000	2,273		9.1%
2010	2,142		−5.8%
2020	2,108		−1.6%
U.S. Decennial Census

=== 2020 census ===
As of the 2020 census, Orleans had a population of 2,108. The median age was 40.0 years. 25.7% of residents were under the age of 18 and 19.5% of residents were 65 years of age or older. For every 100 females there were 89.1 males, and for every 100 females age 18 and over there were 83.6 males age 18 and over.

0.0% of residents lived in urban areas, while 100.0% lived in rural areas.

There were 881 households in Orleans, of which 31.3% had children under the age of 18 living in them. Of all households, 41.7% were married-couple households, 16.2% were households with a male householder and no spouse or partner present, and 34.3% were households with a female householder and no spouse or partner present. About 33.0% of all households were made up of individuals and 18.2% had someone living alone who was 65 years of age or older.

There were 969 housing units, of which 9.1% were vacant. The homeowner vacancy rate was 0.7% and the rental vacancy rate was 3.2%.

Racial composition as of the 2020 census
Race	Number	Percent
White	2,026	96.1%
Black or African American	8	0.4%
American Indian and Alaska Native	5	0.2%
Asian	0	0.0%
Native Hawaiian and Other Pacific Islander	0	0.0%
Some other race	13	0.6%
Two or more races	56	2.7%
Hispanic or Latino (of any race)	28	1.3%

=== 2010 census ===
As of the census of 2010, there were 2,142 people, 904 households, and 581 families living in the town. The population density was 1,252.6 inhabitants per square mile (483.6/km^{2}). There were 1,000 housing units at an average density of 584.8 per square mile (225.8/km^{2}). The racial makeup of the town was 98.6% White, 0.1% African American, 0.3% Native American, 0.4% Asian, and 0.7% from two or more races. Hispanic or Latino of any race were 0.6% of the population.

There were 904 households, of which 32.5% had children under the age of 18 living with them, 48.7% were married couples living together, 11.1% had a female householder with no husband present, 4.5% had a male householder with no wife present, and 35.7% were non-families. 31.5% of all households were made up of individuals, and 15.8% had someone living alone who was 65 years of age or older. The average household size was 2.37 and the average family size was 2.98.

The median age in the town was 40.3 years. 24.5% of residents were under the age of 18; 8.3% were between the ages of 18 and 24; 23.8% were from 25 to 44; 25.4% were from 45 to 64; and 17.8% were 65 years of age or older. The gender makeup of the town was 47.2% male and 52.8% female.

=== 2000 census ===
As of the census of 2000, there were 2,273 people, 922 households, and 614 families living in the town. The population density was 1,449.3 inhabitants per square mile (559.6/km^{2}). There were 992 housing units at an average density of 632.5 per square mile (244.2/km^{2}). The racial makeup of the town was 98.77% White, 0.13% African American, 0.04% Native American, 0.13% from other races, and 0.92% from two or more races. Hispanic or Latino of any race were 1.01% of the population.

There were 922 households, out of which 32.3% had children under the age of 18 living with them, 53.7% were married couples living together, 9.9% had a female householder with no husband present, and 33.4% were non-families. 30.0% of all households were made up of individuals, and 16.8% had someone living alone who was 65 years of age or older. The average household size was 2.47 and the average family size was 3.08.

In the town, the population was spread out, with 28.4% under the age of 18, 8.1% from 18 to 24, 26.5% from 25 to 44, 20.2% from 45 to 64, and 16.8% who were 65 years of age or older. The median age was 36 years. For every 100 females, there were 90.4 males. For every 100 females age 18 and over, there were 83.7 males.

The median income for a household in the town was $27,138, and the median income for a family was $35,150. Males had a median income of $26,630 versus $19,375 for females. The per capita income for the town was $14,476. About 12.3% of families and 17.2% of the population were below the poverty line, including 21.9% of those under age 18 and 16.3% of those age 65 or over.

== Education ==
The town has a lending library, the Orleans Town & Township Public Library.
