= Valeene, Indiana =

- Unincorporated community
- Location within Indiana Location within the United States
- Coordinates: 38°26′20″N 86°23′50″W
- Country: United States
- State: Indiana
- County: Orange
- Township: Southeast
- Elevation: 640 ft (200 m)
- Time zone: UTC-5 (Eastern (EST))
  - Summer (DST): UTC-4 (EDT)
- ZIP code: 47125
- Area codes: 812, 930
- GNIS feature ID: 451594

Valeene is an unincorporated community in Southeast Township, Orange County, in the U.S. state of Indiana.

== History ==
Valeene was laid out in 1837. A post office was established at Valeene in 1828, and remained in operation until it was discontinued in 1953.
