= Pearsontown, Indiana =

- Unincorporated community
- Location within Indiana Location within the United States
- Coordinates: 38°25′15″N 86°23′30″W
- Country: United States
- State: Indiana
- County: Orange
- Township: Southeast
- Elevation: 643 ft (196 m)
- Time zone: UTC-5 (Eastern (EST))
  - Summer (DST): UTC-4 (EDT)
- ZIP code: 47140
- Area codes: 812, 930
- GNIS feature ID: 451321

Pearsontown is an unincorporated community in Southeast Township, Orange County, in the U.S. state of Indiana.
