= Northwest Township, Orange County, Indiana =

Northwest Township
- Township
- Location in Orange County
- Coordinates: 38°40′00″N 86°37′00″W
- Country: United States
- State: Indiana
- County: Orange

Government
  - Type: Indiana township

Area
  - Total: 30.41 sq mi (78.8 km^{2})
  - Land: 30.3 sq mi (78 km^{2})
  - Water: 0.11 sq mi (0.28 km^{2}) 0.36%
- Elevation: 643 ft (196 m)

Population (2020)
  - Total: 330
  - Density: 11/sq mi (4.2/km^{2})
- Time zone: UTC-5 (Eastern (EST))
  - Summer (DST): UTC-4 (EDT)
- ZIP codes: 47452, 47469
- Area codes: 812, 930
- GNIS feature ID: 452424

Northwest Township is one of ten townships in Orange County, Indiana, United States. As of the 2020 census, its population was 330 and it contained 183 housing units.

Historical population
Census	Pop.	Note	%±
1890	972		—
1900	878		−9.7%
1910	794		−9.6%
1920	703		−11.5%
1930	581		−17.4%
1940	570		−1.9%
1950	407		−28.6%
1960	350		−14.0%
1970	326		−6.9%
1980	343		5.2%
1990	359		4.7%
2000	345		−3.9%
2010	375		8.7%
2020	330		−12.0%
Source: US Decennial Census

== History ==
Northwest Township was named from its position in the northwestern corner of Orange County.

== Geography ==
According to the 2010 census, the township has a total area of 30.41 square miles (78.8 km^{2}), of which 30.3 square miles (78 km^{2}) (or 99.64%) is land and 0.11 square miles (0.28 km^{2}) (or 0.36%) is water.

=== Cemeteries ===
The township contains these three cemeteries: Faucett, Freeman and Miller.

=== Major highways ===
- U.S. Route 150

== School districts ==
- Springs Valley Community School Corporation

== Political districts ==
- Indiana's 9th congressional district
- State House District 62
- State Senate District 48
