= Jonathan Lindley =

Member of the North Carolina legislature (1756–1828)

Jonathan Lindley (1756–1828) was an 18th-century member of the North Carolina legislature, land speculator, and one of the original settlers of Orange County, Indiana.

== Early years in North Carolina ==
Lindley was born in Alamance County, North Carolina (then still part of Orange County) on June 15, 1756, to Thomas and Ruth Lindley, Quaker immigrants from County Wicklow, Ireland. The Lindleys had first lived in Chester County, Pennsylvania, but moved to the Piedmont region of North Carolina, where they settled on Cane Creek, a tributary of the Haw River, near the town of Saxapahaw at a spot later known as Lindley's Mill.

The Battle of Lindley's Mill, fought between Loyalists and Patriot militias on Thomas Lindley's property, was the last battle of the Revolutionary War in North Carolina. According to family tradition, Thomas Lindley died the following day from the shock of the battle waged on his land. Like many North Carolina families, the Lindleys were torn apart by the war. Jonathan's brother James, who was twenty years older and had settled in upcountry South Carolina, served as a prominent Loyalist militia captain. James Lindley was taken prisoner at the Battle of Ninety-Six and executed for treason in the battle's aftermath. James' son William, of Chatham County, commanded Loyalist militia during the battle waged at his grandfather's mill. After the British evacuated Wilmington, William Lindley headed west to the Blue Ridge Mountains with the brutal Loyalist Colonel David Fanning, and was then murdered by Loyalist deserters in January 1782 at the Watauga settlement in eastern Tennessee. (Fanning claimed that William Lindley was "cut to pieces with their swords" and personally tracked down two of the assassins and hanged them.)

Jonathan Lindley went into the lumbering and turpentine business, speculating in wilderness acreage in central North Carolina. He quickly became one of the leading men and merchants of the area. In 1786, Lindley served in the North Carolina General Assembly at Hillsborough, also participating in the state convention that ratified the U.S. Constitution in 1788. Lindley was among the North Carolinians who insisted on amendments to the original Federal constitution, which resulted in the Bill of Rights. He also supported the creation of the University of North Carolina, the first public university in the United States. The school was built on a hill near a chapel not far from Lindley's own property, a spot later called Chapel Hill.

As a Quaker with anti-slavery convictions, Lindley introduced several bills to curb slavery, one of which called for an end to the importation of slaves from Africa to North Carolina, a crucial first step toward abolition. The slave trade in North Carolina was outlawed in 1794, partly through Lindley's efforts, though slavery itself survived until the Civil War. Lindley left the General Assembly in 1805.

== Settling in Indiana ==
As new land in the Midwest was opened to settlement, land-hungry Quakers – often motivated by their ideals regarding slavery – began to move out of the "Quaker Belt" of the South. By 1808, Jonathan Lindley had already been considering a move west from North Carolina. As a successful landowner and lumber merchant, he was not motivated by the slavery issue alone. The Midwest's unbroken forests were primarily what attracted him north. Indiana Territory attracted many Southerners, in large part due to the Northwest Ordinance of 1787, which radically simplified land titles and helped owners secure a clear legal hold on their property. This appealed to settlers from the South, where deeding new land had grown complicated and often led to protracted, even violent, disputes.

Lindley and his son Zachariah traveled overland to Indiana Territory in 1808 to prospect for land. Lindley was mesmerized by Indiana's old-growth woodlands. He purchased large tracts of land along the Wabash River in present-day Parke County and initially intended to establish a Quaker colony near Fort Harrison, just north of the future site of Terre Haute. (In 1816, Lindley was still the largest stockholder in Abraham Markle's "Terre Haute Company," which platted the town in 1821. Some sources cite him as a founder of Terre Haute.)

Zachariah Lindley had established a grist mill on Lick Creek, in the limestone uplands forty miles northwest of Louisville, near what became Paoli, Indiana. Jonathan Lindley returned from North Carolina in 1811 with around twenty families. At least eleven of these families were "free colored," descendants of Africans and Lumbee, a Native American tribe in southeastern North Carolina. (The Lumbee often married African Americans and thus came to be classified as "colored" by the state.) Increasingly stripped of their rights by the Black Codes in the antebellum South, free blacks had compelling reasons to leave and often resettled near Quakers when they moved to the Midwest.

Originally intending to settle in the Wabash Valley, Lindley's settlers (numbering 218 people) were turned back by the outbreak of conflict between Tecumseh's Shawnee Confederation and the Indiana militia led by Territorial Governor William Henry Harrison. Turned away from the Wabash Valley, Jonathan Lindley and his family lived first near Richmond, Indiana, then purchased land at Lick Creek in what was later christened Orange County, Indiana, after his North Carolina birthplace. (Lick Creek itself was apparently named for a tributary of the Haw River near the old Lindley Mill in Chatham County, North Carolina.

Lindley's Lick Creek settlement, four miles east of the later town of Paoli along the road to Chambersburg, was one of the earliest white settlements in southern Indiana. Many of the free black settlers who moved north with him settled farther back away from the Chambersburg Road, in a remote part of what became the Hoosier National Forest. This settlement is also often referred to as "Lick Creek" or "Little Africa" and was abandoned by the early 20th century.

In 1814, Lindley became an Indiana territorial court judge. He was a member of Indiana House of Representatives from 1816 to 1817, where he served on a committee to locate a spot for a state university (at that time called Indiana Seminary) in Bloomington. Lindley thus played a role in founding both the University of North Carolina and Indiana University.

He died in Orange County on April 5, 1828. His interment was at Old Lick Creek Quaker Cemetery, along U.S. 150 in Chambersburg, Indiana.

The Thomas Elwood Lindley House in Paoli was owned by Jonathan Lindley's son and was built in 1869 on land deeded to him in 1812. In 1974, the house was given to the Orange County Historical Society and is often open to visitors.
