= Orange County, Indiana =

County in Indiana, United States

- County
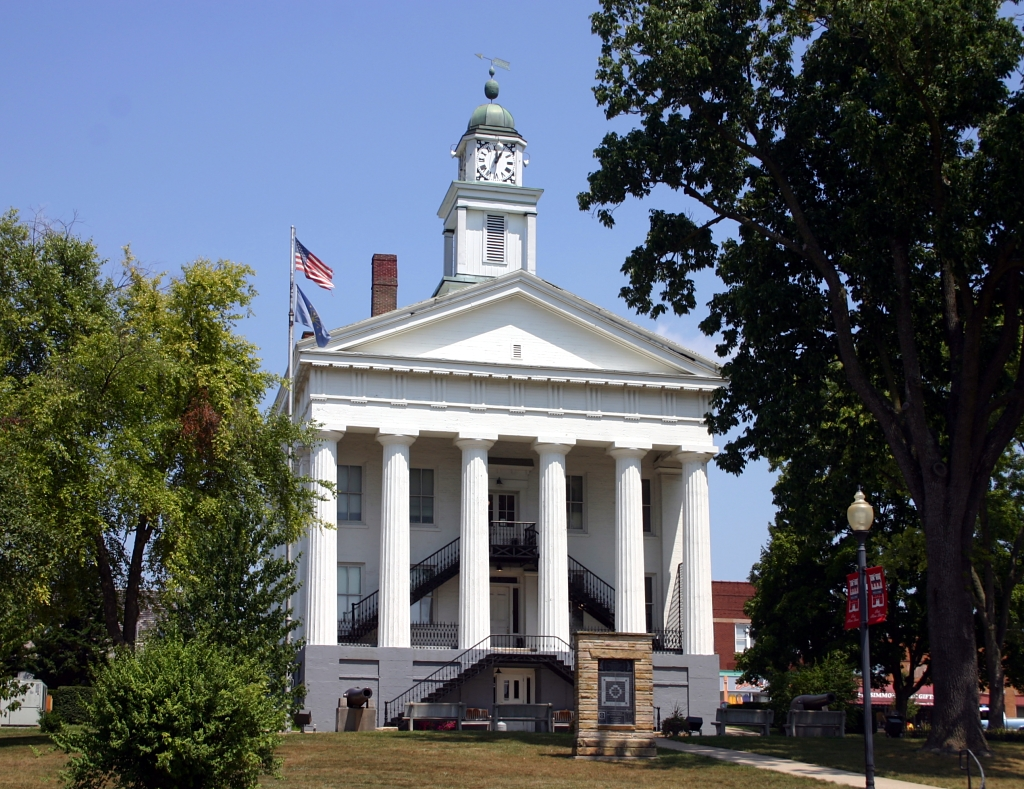
- The Orange County Courthouse in Paoli

- Location within the U.S. state of Indiana
- Coordinates: 38°32′N 86°30′W
- Country: United States
- State: Indiana
- Founded: February 1, 1816
- Named for: King William of Orange (William III of England)
- Seat: Paoli
- Largest town: Paoli

Area
  - Total: 408.19 sq mi (1,057.2 km^{2})
  - Land: 398.39 sq mi (1,031.8 km^{2})
  - Water: 9.80 sq mi (25.4 km^{2}) 2.40%

Population (2020)
  - Total: 19,867
  - Estimate (2025): 19,834 ▼
  - Density: 50/sq mi (19/km^{2})
- Time zone: UTC−5 (Eastern)
  - Summer (DST): UTC−4 (EDT)
- Congressional district: 8th
- Website: gov.orangecounty59.us
- Indiana county number 59

Orange County is located in Southern Indiana in the United States. As of 2020, its population was 19,867. The county seat is Paoli. The county has four incorporated settlements with a total population of about 8,600, as well as several small unincorporated communities. It is divided into 10 townships which provide local services. One U.S. route and five Indiana state roads pass through or into the county.

== History ==
Orange County was formed from parts of Knox County, Gibson County and Washington County by the Indiana Territorial Legislature, on December 26, 1815 (effective February 1, 1816). In 1816 the Orange County seat was designated at Paoli, which was named after Pasquale Paoli Ash, the 12-year-old son of the sitting North Carolina Governor.

The early settlers were mostly Quakers fleeing the institution of slavery in Orange County, North Carolina. Jonathan Lindley brought his group of Quakers from North Carolina to the area in 1811. They were the first to build a religious structure, the Lick Creek Meeting House in 1813. It was from this group that Orange County got its name. (See List of Indiana county name etymologies). The name Orange derives from the Dutch Protestant House of Orange, which accessed the English throne with the accession of King William III in 1689, following the Glorious Revolution.

When the North Carolina Quakers came to Indiana, they brought several freed slaves. These free men were deeded 200 acres (0.81 km^{2}) of land in the heart of a dense forest. Word of mouth soon spread the news, and this land became part of the "underground railroad" for runaway slaves. For many years, the freed slaves in this area farmed, traded, and sold their labor to others while living in this settlement. A church and cemetery were constructed.

All that remains today is the cemetery, with many lost or vandalized headstones. Several years ago, Boy Scouts restored the cemetery, replacing the stones with wooden crosses designating a grave. The name of "Little Africa" came about because of the black settlement, but it was called "Paddy's Garden" by its early users.

=== Courthouse ===
The first courthouse was a temporary log structure that was built for $25; a more permanent stone structure was completed in 1819 at a cost of $3,950. (Note: A $3,950 capital expense in 1816 would be roughly equivalent to $2,000,000 in 2010.) In 1847, plans were made for a larger courthouse, which was completed in 1850 at a cost of $14,000. (Note: A $14,000 capital expense in 1850 would be roughly equivalent to $6,000,000 in 2010.) This building is the second oldest courthouse in the state that has been continuously used since its construction. Like the oldest in Ohio County, it is a Greek Revival building with two stories and a Doric portico supported by fluted columns; it has ornamental iron stairs and a clock tower. In 1970, the clock tower was damaged by fire. On August 6, 2023, the clock tower was damaged by an EF-1 tornado.

== Geography ==
Map of Orange County, showing townships and settlements

Much of the south part of the county, south of Paoli and French Lick, is part of the Hoosier National Forest. Patoka Lake is within the national forest; the majority of the lake lies in Orange County, with parts extending into neighboring Dubois and Crawford counties.

According to the 2010 United States census, Orange County has a total area of 408.19 square miles (1,057.2 km^{2}), of which 398.39 square miles (1,031.8 km^{2}) (or 97.60%) is land and 9.80 square miles (25.4 km^{2}) (or 2.40%) is water.

=== Adjacent counties ===
- Lawrence County – north
- Washington County – east
- Crawford County – south
- Dubois County – southwest
- Martin County – northwest

=== Towns ===
- French Lick
- Orleans
- Paoli (county seat)
- West Baden Springs

=== Unincorporated communities ===
- Abydel
- Bacon
- Bromer
- Chambersburg
- Ethel
- Fargo – called Pittsburgh before 1888
- Greenbrier - also Green Brier
- Leipsic – called Lancaster before 1852
- Lost River
- Mahan Crossing
- Millersburg
- Newton Stewart
- Orangeville
- Pearsontown
- Prospect – called New Prospect before 1853
- Pumpkin Center
- Rego
- Stampers Creek
- Trotter Crossing
- Valeene
- Woodlawn Grove
- Youngs Creek – called Unionville before 1867

Moffatt Hollar

=== Townships ===
- French Lick
- Greenfield
- Jackson
- Northeast
- Northwest
- Orangeville
- Orleans
- Paoli
- Southeast
- Stampers Creek

== Transportation ==
=== Highways ===
- U.S. Route 150 – runs east–west through central part of county. Passes French Lick, Turleys, and Paoli.
- Indiana State Road 37 – runs north–south through central part of county. Passes Orleans, Paoli, and Bacon.
- Indiana State Road 56 – enters west line of county at 6.6 miles (10.6 km) north of SW county corner. Runs NE to intersection with US-150 north of West Baden Springs.
- Indiana State Road 60 – runs NW-SE across northeastern tip of county. Enters 2 miles west of NE corner and exits 2 miles south of NE corner.
- Indiana State Road 145 – enters south line of county at 3.7 miles (6.0 km) from SW county corner. Runs north to intersection with Indiana-56 at French Lick.
- Indiana State Road 337 – runs SE-NW across northeastern part of county. Enters east line of county near Bromer, then runs NW to intersection with Indiana-37 at Orleans.

=== Airports ===
- Paoli Municipal Airport - public-owned public-use general-aviation airport with one paved runway.
- French Lick Municipal Airport

French Lick Municipal Airport (IATA: FRH, ICAO: KFRH, FAA LID: FRH) is a city-owned public-use airport located three nautical miles (6 km) southwest of the central business district of French Lick, a town in Orange County, Indiana, United States.[1] Also known as French Lick Airport, it serves the French Lick and West Baden, Indiana area.[2]

=== Railways ===
French Lick Scenic Railway (French Lick West Baden and Southern Railway/ Indiana Railway Museum) provides train rides aboard the French Lick Scenic Railway and tours through parts of the Hoosier National Forest, including the 2,200-foot Burton Tunnel and past limestone outcroppings.

== Climate and weather ==
Paoli, Indiana

Climate chart (precipitation, max. and min. temperature)
J	F	M	A	M	J	J	A	S	O	N	D
3.3 38 18	3.1 44 22	4.4 55 31	4.8 65 40	5.1 75 50	4.2 83 60	4.5 87 64	4.2 85 62	3.3 79 53	2.9 68 40	4.2 55 32	3.6 43 23
- █ Average max. and min. temperatures in °F
- █ Precipitation totals in inches
- Source: The Weather Channel
Metric conversion
J	F	M	A	M	J	J	A	S	O	N	D
84 3 −8	79 7 −6	111 13 −1	123 18 4	131 24 10	106 28 16	113 31 18	106 29 17	83 26 12	74 20 4	107 13 0	92 6 −5
- █ Average max. and min. temperatures in °C
- █ Precipitation totals in mm

In recent years, average temperatures in Paoli have ranged from a low of 18 °F (−8 °C) in January to a high of 87 °F (31 °C) in July, although a record low of −29 °F (−34 °C) was recorded in January 1994 and a record high of 111 °F (44 °C) was recorded in July 1901. Average monthly precipitation ranged from 2.90 inches (74 mm) in October to 5.14 inches (131 mm) in May.

== Demographics ==
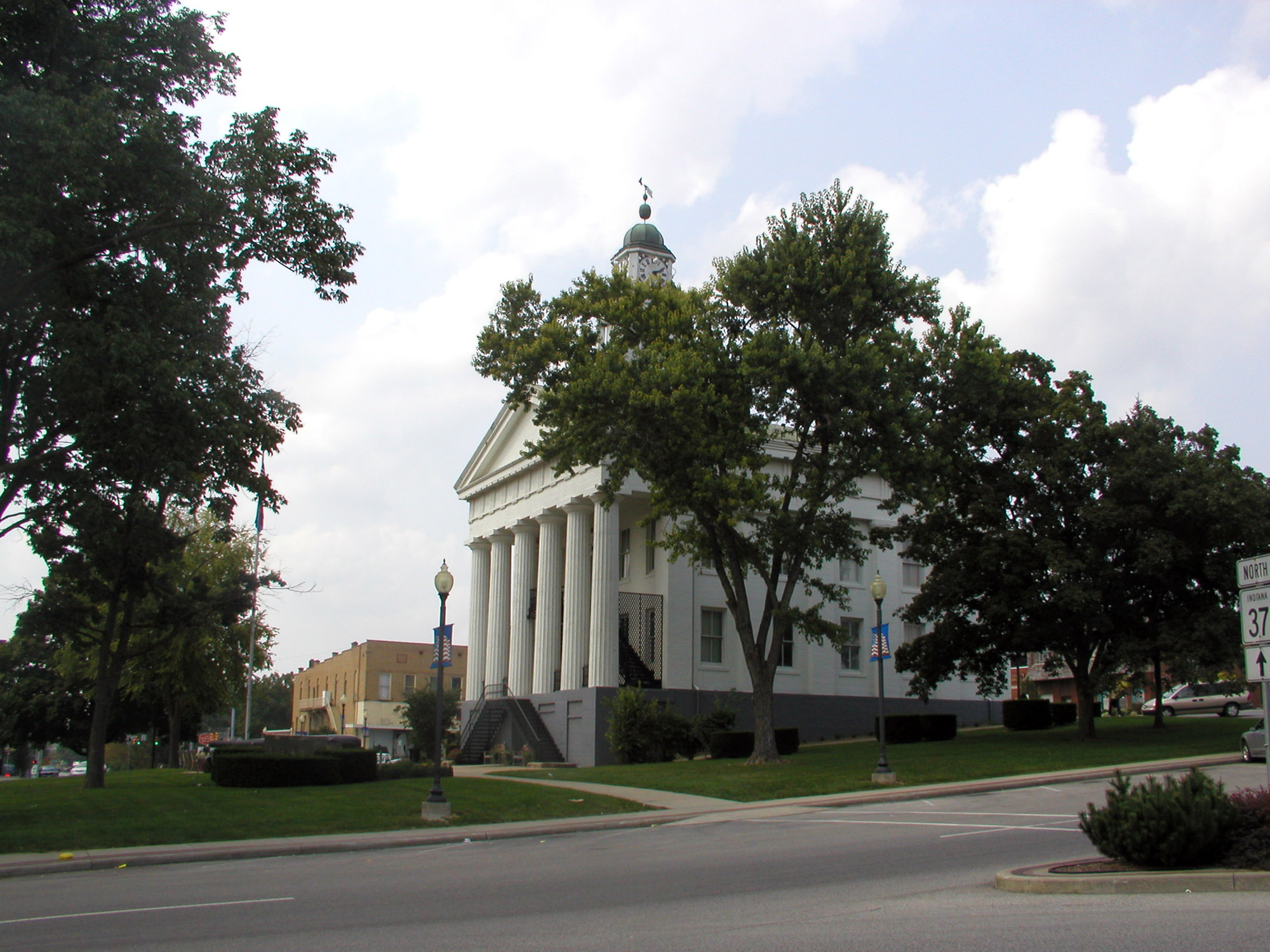
The Orange County Courthouse in the center of the Paoli, Indiana town square

Historical population
Census	Pop.	Note	%±
1820	5,368		—
1830	7,901		47.2%
1840	9,602		21.5%
1850	10,809		12.6%
1860	12,076		11.7%
1870	13,497		11.8%
1880	14,363		6.4%
1890	14,678		2.2%
1900	16,854		14.8%
1910	17,192		2.0%
1920	16,974		−1.3%
1930	17,459		2.9%
1940	17,311		−0.8%
1950	16,879		−2.5%
1960	16,877		0.0%
1970	16,968		0.5%
1980	18,677		10.1%
1990	18,409		−1.4%
2000	19,306		4.9%
2010	19,840		2.8%
2020	19,867		0.1%
2025 (est.)	19,834	▼	−0.2%
US Decennial Census; 1790-1960 1900-1990; 1990-2000 2010-2020

=== Racial and ethnic composition ===
Orange County, Indiana – Racial and ethnic composition Note: the US Census treats Hispanic/Latino as an ethnic category. This table excludes Latinos from the racial categories and assigns them to a separate category. Hispanics/Latinos may be of any race.
Race / Ethnicity (NH = Non-Hispanic)	Pop 1980	Pop 1990	Pop 2000	Pop 2010	Pop 2020	% 1980	% 1990	% 2000	% 2010	% 2020
White alone (NH)	18,295	18,164	18,833	19,144	18,527	97.95%	98.67%	97.55%	96.49%	93.26%
Black or African American alone (NH)	223	127	113	168	200	1.19%	0.69%	0.59%	0.85%	1.01%
Native American or Alaska Native alone (NH)	19	38	59	52	37	0.10%	0.21%	0.31%	0.26%	0.19%
Asian alone (NH)	26	20	31	61	60	0.14%	0.11%	0.16%	0.31%	0.30%
Native Hawaiian or Pacific Islander alone (NH)	x	x	2	2	11	x	x	0.01%	0.01%	0.06%
Other race alone (NH)	17	1	32	7	34	0.09%	0.01%	0.17%	0.04%	0.17%
Mixed race or Multiracial (NH)	x	x	128	212	693	x	x	0.66%	1.07%	3.49%
Hispanic or Latino (any race)	97	59	108	194	305	0.52%	0.32%	0.56%	0.98%	1.54%
Total	18,677	18,409	19,306	19,840	19,867	100.00%	100.00%	100.00%	100.00%	100.00%

=== 2020 census ===
As of the 2020 census, the county had a population of 19,867. The median age was 42.5 years. 23.3% of residents were under the age of 18 and 20.1% of residents were 65 years of age or older. For every 100 females there were 99.9 males, and for every 100 females age 18 and over there were 97.0 males age 18 and over.

The racial makeup of the county was 93.8% White, 1.0% Black or African American, 0.2% American Indian and Alaska Native, 0.3% Asian, 0.1% Native Hawaiian and Pacific Islander, 0.7% from some other race, and 3.9% from two or more races. Hispanic or Latino residents of any race comprised 1.5% of the population.

<0.1% of residents lived in urban areas, while 100.0% lived in rural areas.

There were 7,982 households in the county, of which 29.2% had children under the age of 18 living in them. Of all households, 49.5% were married-couple households, 18.5% were households with a male householder and no spouse or partner present, and 24.4% were households with a female householder and no spouse or partner present. About 28.0% of all households were made up of individuals and 13.0% had someone living alone who was 65 years of age or older.

There were 9,058 housing units, of which 11.9% were vacant. Among occupied housing units, 74.3% were owner-occupied and 25.7% were renter-occupied. The homeowner vacancy rate was 1.1% and the rental vacancy rate was 4.6%.

=== 2010 census ===
As of the 2010 United States census, there were 19,840 people, 7,872 households, and 5,416 families in the county. The population density was 49.8 inhabitants per square mile (19.2/km^{2}). There were 9,176 housing units at an average density of 23.0 per square mile (8.9/km^{2}). The racial makeup of the county was 97.0% white, 0.9% black or African American, 0.3% Asian, 0.3% American Indian, 0.3% from other races, and 1.2% from two or more races. Those of Hispanic or Latino origin made up 1.0% of the population. In terms of ancestry, 22.6% were of English ancestry, 18.8% were of German ancestry and 12.4% were of Irish ancestry.

Of the 7,872 households, 32.3% had children under the age of 18 living with them, 53.4% were married couples living together, 10.4% had a female householder with no husband present, 31.2% were non-families, and 26.7% of all households were made up of individuals. The average household size was 2.49 and the average family size was 3.00. The median age was 40.8 years.

The median income for a household in the county was $47,697 and the median income for a family was $45,874. Males had a median income of $35,679 versus $30,072 for females. The per capita income for the county was $19,119. About 13.5% of families and 20.2% of the population were below the poverty line, including 29.7% of those under age 18 and 14.7% of those age 65 or over.

== Government ==
The county government is a constitutional body granted specific powers by the Constitution of Indiana and the Indiana Code. The county council is the legislative branch of the county government and controls all spending and revenue collection. Representatives are elected from county districts. The council members serve four-year terms and are responsible for setting salaries, the annual budget and special spending. The council also has limited authority to impose local taxes, in the form of an income and property tax that is subject to state level approval, excise taxes and service taxes.

A board of commissioners is the county's executive body. Commissioners are elected in staggered four-year terms. The board is charged with executing the council's decisions, with collecting revenue, and with managing the county government.

The county maintains a small claims court that can handle some civil cases. The judge on the court is elected to a term of four years and must be a member of the Indiana Bar Association. The judge is assisted by a constable who is elected to a four-year term. In some cases, court decisions can be appealed to the state level circuit court.

The county has several other elected offices, including sheriff, coroner, auditor, treasurer, recorder, surveyor and circuit court clerk. Each serves a four-year term, and oversees a different part of county government. Members elected to county government positions are required to declare party affiliations and be residents of the county.

Each township has a trustee and a three-member board, which administers rural fire protection and ambulance service, provides poor relief and manages cemetery care, among other duties. The trustee and board members are elected to four-year terms.

Orange County is part of Indiana's 8th congressional district. It is part of Indiana Senate districts 44 and 48, and Indiana House of Representatives district 62.

United States presidential election results for Orange County, Indiana
Year	Republican		Democratic		Third party(ies)	
Year	No.	%	No.	%	No.	%
1888	1,779	51.67%	1,654	48.04%	10	0.29%
1892	1,653	46.92%	1,628	46.21%	242	6.87%
1896	2,044	52.80%	1,797	46.42%	30	0.77%
1900	2,247	53.82%	1,851	44.34%	77	1.84%
1904	2,458	55.25%	1,888	42.44%	103	2.32%
1908	2,433	53.92%	1,961	43.46%	118	2.62%
1912	1,521	35.27%	1,830	42.43%	962	22.30%
1916	2,481	52.94%	2,091	44.62%	114	2.43%
1920	4,726	58.86%	3,222	40.13%	81	1.01%
1924	4,538	56.04%	3,374	41.66%	186	2.30%
1928	5,086	61.77%	3,112	37.79%	36	0.44%
1932	4,561	48.08%	4,844	51.06%	82	0.86%
1936	5,106	52.68%	4,549	46.94%	37	0.38%
1940	5,519	57.77%	4,003	41.90%	31	0.32%
1944	4,784	60.06%	3,130	39.29%	52	0.65%
1948	4,574	57.03%	3,359	41.88%	88	1.10%
1952	5,551	62.38%	3,272	36.77%	75	0.84%
1956	5,751	62.37%	3,438	37.28%	32	0.35%
1960	5,589	59.19%	3,818	40.44%	35	0.37%
1964	4,187	48.07%	4,490	51.55%	33	0.38%
1968	4,666	54.82%	2,918	34.28%	928	10.90%
1972	5,715	65.89%	2,932	33.80%	27	0.31%
1976	4,399	51.90%	4,031	47.56%	46	0.54%
1980	5,073	59.28%	3,228	37.72%	257	3.00%
1984	5,909	69.40%	2,571	30.19%	35	0.41%
1988	5,245	65.44%	2,739	34.17%	31	0.39%
1992	3,738	46.64%	2,948	36.78%	1,329	16.58%
1996	3,355	45.69%	3,016	41.07%	972	13.24%
2000	4,687	62.85%	2,601	34.88%	170	2.28%
2004	5,683	65.68%	2,885	33.34%	84	0.97%
2008	4,536	55.94%	3,390	41.81%	182	2.24%
2012	4,617	59.38%	2,939	37.80%	220	2.83%
2016	5,803	70.10%	2,048	24.74%	427	5.16%
2020	6,432	72.73%	2,224	25.15%	188	2.13%
2024	6,467	75.24%	1,988	23.13%	140	1.63%

== Education ==
The county is served by four school districts:

- Lost River Career Cooperative
- Orleans Community Schools
- Paoli Community School Corporation
- Springs Valley Community School Corporation

Orleans Community Schools (Superintendent: Jimmy Ellis) includes:

- Orleans Elementary School (Principal: Joni Lawyer)
- Orleans Jr./Sr. High School (Principal: Daniel Wolford).

Paoli Community Schools (Superintendent:Greg Walker) includes:

- Throop Elementary School (Principal:Amanda Crews)
- Paoli Junior-Senior High School (Principal:Dr. Sherry Wise).

Springs Valley School Corporation (Superintendent: Trevor Apple) includes:

- Springs Valley Elementary School (Principal: Matthew Williams)
- Springs Valley Jr./Sr. High School (Principal: Kyle Neukam)

== See also ==
- National Register of Historic Places listings in Orange County, Indiana

== Bibliography ==
- Goodspeed, Weston A.; Goodspeed, Leroy C.; Goodspeed, Charles L. (1884). "Part III: Orange County". History of Lawrence, Orange and Washington Counties, Indiana. Chicago: Goodspeed Brothers & Co.
