= List of Indiana State University people =

This is a list of notable current and former faculty members, alumni, and non-graduating attendees of Indiana State University in Terre Haute, Indiana.

== Notable alumni ==
=== Academia ===
==== Presidents and chancellors ====
- Ahmadshah Abdullah, Pro-Chancellor of MARA University of Technology.
- Isaac K. Beckes, president, Vincennes University (1950–1980)
- Elmer Burritt Bryan, president of Colgate University (1909–1921), Ohio University (1921–1934), Franklin College
- Isaac M. Burgan, president, Paul Quinn College (1883–1891, 1911–1914)
- Lotus Coffman, president of the University of Minnesota (1920–1938)
- Myron Coulter, chancellor, Western Carolina University (1984–1994)
- Lewis C. Dowdy, sixth president and first chancellor of North Carolina Agricultural and Technical State University (1964–1980)
- John R. Gregg, 20th president, Vincennes University (2003–2004)
- Sharon Hart, president of RIT Kosovo and Northern Marianas College
- Martin David Jenkins, president, Morgan State University (1948–1970)
- John Edward McGilvrey, first president, Kent State University (1911–1926)
- Edison E. Oberholtzer, founder and president, University of Houston (1927–1950)
- Lou Anna K. Simon, president, Michigan State University (2003–2018)
- Ronald L. Vaughn, president, University of Tampa (1995–present)

==== Deans ====
- Major E. Holmes, dean of the New York State College of Ceramics at Alfred University and founder and head of the Department of Ceramic Engineering at the Missouri School of Mine
- Robert Jerry, dean, University of Florida, Levin College of Law (2003–present)
- Laura Linnan, Senior Associate Dean for Academic and Student Affairs and a professor of Health Behavior at the UNC Gillings School of Global Public Health

==== Professors ====
- Ronald Akers, professor emeritus of criminology and law at the University of Florida's College of Liberal Arts and Sciences
- Ronald L. Baker, folklorist, professor, historian, scholar of literature and onomastics
- Birch Bayh, professor, coach, athletic director, Indiana State University
- James J. Brady, physicist on the faculty of Oregon State University
- Nicola Di Cosmo, Luce Foundation Professor in East Asian Studies at the Institute for Advanced Study
- Barton Warren Evermann, professor of biology at the Indiana State University, Stanford University, Cornell University, and at Yale University
- Hallie Farmer, head of the political science and history department at Alabama College for Women (now the University of Montevallo)
- Mel Levy, physics faculty of Tulane University, North Carolina A&T State University, and Duke University
- Fred Albert Shannon, professor and historian, won the 1929 Pulitzer Prize (History)
- William Harrison Mace, educator, author, professor of history
- Johnny Matson, professor; psychologist at Louisiana State University
- Andrew C. Porter, president, AERA, professor, Vanderbilt University

==== Other academic and education ====
- Dwight Conquergood, enthnographer, Northwestern University (1978–2004)
- Caleb Mills, second Indiana superintendent of Public Instruction (1854–1857)

=== Art ===
- Jimoh Akolo, artist
- Léopold L. Foulem, ceramicist
- Mary Alice Hadley, potter
- Greg Land, comic book artist
- Sister Edith Pfau, S.P., painter and sculptor

=== Business ===
- Tony George, founder and team owner, Indy Racing League
- Jim Lewis, president, Disney Vacation Club

=== Entertainment ===
- Jerry Baker, sports announcer
- Michael Evans Behling, model and actor
- Joseph Benti, anchor of the CBS Morning News
- Bubba the Love Sponge (born Todd Alan Clem), radio talk show host
- Erika Celeste, radio and television journalist
- Russell Collins, actor
- David Darling, Grammy Award-winning cellist, composer
- Gerry Dick, television journalist, news anchor, founder Grow Indiana Media
- EST Gee, rapper
- Bernard Glasser, film director and producer
- Belford Hendricks, composer, pianist, arranger, conductor and record producer
- Nate Hirsch, sports broadcaster
- Burl Ives, singer, actor, entertainer
- Ron Klimko, bassoonist and composer
- James B. Leong, actor
- Alvy Moore, movie and television personality
- Bill Moring, jazz bassist
- Wanda Ramey, pioneer female news anchor
- Rudy Render, music arranger/director; musician; actor; educator
- Jared Yates Sexton, author and political commentator
- Tom Trimble, 1974 Emmy Award-winning art director
- Stuart Vaughn, Obie Award-winning director

=== Law ===
- Gene E. Brooks, judge, U.S. District Court for the Southern District of Indiana, 1979–1994; chief judge 1987–1994
- Noma Gurich, justice of the Oklahoma Supreme Court, State of Oklahoma
- Allen Sharp, senior judge, U.S. District Court for the Northern District of Indiana, 1973–2009; chief judge 1981–1996

=== Literature and journalism ===
- Troy Brownfield, journalist and columnist for The Saturday Evening Post
- Dillon Burroughs, spiritual writer
- Jasper Goodykoontz, creator of Goodykoontz's Perpetual Calendar and General Reference: A Book for the Millions
- Marie Holderman, wner, editor and publisher of the Cocoa Tribune
- Jamal Khashoggi (B.S. business administration 1983); Saudi dissident, author, and editor Washington Post columnist
- Margaret Hill McCarter, 1884 A.B., novelist
- Ami McKay, writer
- Will Weng, journalist, New York Times

=== Military ===
- David Brant, Director of the Naval Criminal Investigative Service
- Willa Brown, first African-American female officer in Civil Air Patrol; aerospace pioneer; first African-American woman commercial pilot in United States
- William S. Hillyer, Brevet Brigadier General during the American Civil War
- Kenneth L. Peek, Jr., lieutenant general, United States Air Force, former 8 AF commander
- Quentin P. Smith, 1st lieutenant, Tuskegee Airmen, educator, civic leader

=== Politics ===
==== Members of Congress ====
- Birch Bayh, United State Senate, Indiana (1963–1981)
- John S. Benham, United States House of Representatives, Indiana 4th District (1919–1923)
- Thurman C. Crook, United States House of Representatives, Indiana 3rd District (1949–1951)
- Brad Ellsworth, United States House of Representatives, Indiana 8th District (2007–2011)
- Clarence C. Gilhams, United States House of Representatives, Indiana 12th District (1906–1909)
- Brian Kerns, United States House of Representatives, Indiana 7th District (2001–2003)
- William Larrabee, United States House of Representatives for Indiana 6th and 11th Districts (1931–1943)
- D. Bailey Merrill, United States House of Representatives, Indiana 8th District (1953–1955)
- John T. Myers, United States House of Representatives, Indiana 7th District (1967–1997)
- Edward A. Pease, United States House of Representatives, Indiana 7th District (1997–2001)
- Everett Sanders, United States House of Representatives, Indiana 5th District (1917–1925); secretary to President Calvin Coolidge (1925–1929); chairman, Republican National Committee (1932–1934)
- Albert Henry Vestal, United States House of Representatives, Indiana 8th District (1917–1932); Republican whip (1923–1931)
- Fred Wampler, United States House of Representatives, Indiana 6th District (1959–1961)

==== State political leaders ====
- John J. Bullington, Illinois House of Representatives
- Dave Cheatham, Indiana House of Representatives
- Matt Commons, Indiana House of Representatives
- William Fleece, Florida House of Representatives
- Greg Goode, Indiana Senate (2023–present)
- Madge Miller Green, Illinois Senate
- John R. Gregg, Indiana House of Representatives, 1986–2002; speaker of the House 1996–2002, majority leader 1990–1994
- Bob Heaton, Indiana House of Representatives, 2010–present
- Ed Hernandez, California State Senate and California State Assembly
- Phillip Hinkle, Indiana House of Representatives, 2000–2012
- Cary D. Landis, Florida attorney general (1931–1938)
- Shane Lindauer, Indiana House of Representatives
- Carolene Mays, member of Indiana Utility Regulatory Commission; former Indiana House of Representatives 2002–2008
- Richard M. Milburn, Indiana attorney general (January 1915–November 1915)
- Alan Morrison, director of Indiana Department of Natural Resources, former member of the Indiana House of Representatives
- Mike Tryon, Illinois House of Representatives, 2005–2017

==== Diplomats ====
- George Washington Buckner, ambassador to Liberia (1913–1915)
- Cynthia Shepard Perry (b. 1928), ambassador to Sierra Leone (1986–1989), Burundi (1989–1993)

==== Other countries ====
- Grace Folashade Bent, Nigerian senator
- Ahmad Said Hamdan, 1st Chief Commissioner of the Malaysian Anti-Corruption Commission
- Hasan Zaglam, Libyan Minister of Financ

==== Local politics ====
- Robert E. Armstrong, Mayor of Fort Wayne
- John Dennis, mayor of West Lafayette, Indiana
- P. Pete Chalos, mayor of Terre Haute, Indiana 1980–1996
- John Dennis, mayor of West Lafayette, Indiana
- P. Pete Chalos, mayor of Terre Haute, Indiana 1980–1996

==== Other politics ====
- Marvella Bayh, late wife of long-time Indiana senator Birch Bayh; mother of former Indiana senator Birch Evans Bayh III; instrumental in establishing Hoosier Girls State at Indiana State University
- Susan Porter Rose, chief of staff to the First Lady of the United States (1989–1993)

=== Religion ===
- Bill Carmody, Roman Catholic priest
- Rose Angela Horan, Superior General of the Sisters of Providence of Saint Mary-of-the-Woods
- Brother Jed, evangelist

=== Science and medicine ===
- H. R. Cox, bacteriologist, discovered Rocky Mountain spotted fever treatment and several typhus vaccines
- Samuel Frederick Hildebrand, ichthyologist
- DeLill Nasser, geneticist with the National Science Foundation
- Jill Bolte Taylor, "The Singing Scientist", neuroanatomist, one of 2008 Time magazine's "100 Most Influential People"
- J. Buzz Von Ornsteiner, forensic psychologist, television personality

=== Sports ===
- Bilqis Abdul-Qaadir, college basketball player
- Nevin Ashley, former Major League Baseball player for the Milwaukee Brewers
- Richard Atha, former professional basketball player for the New York Knicks and Fort Wayne Pistons
- Robbie Avila, one-time Sycamores basketball player
- Jake Bain, former college football player, LGBTQ+ activist, and social worker (transferred)
- Clint Barmes, former Major League Baseball player for the Colorado Rockies, Houston Astros, Pittsburgh Pirates, and San Diego Padres
- Tim Barrett, former Major League Baseball player for the Montreal Expos
- Bruce Baumgartner, wrestler, Olympic gold medalist, James E. Sullivan Award
- Jeff Belskus, president, Indy Eleven Soccer franchise
- Junius “Rainey” Bibbs, professional baseball player
- Larry Bird, professional basketball player for the Boston Celtics and administrator
- Jerry Blemker, junior college baseball coach, Vincennes University 1980–2006; leader in wins, NJCAA; 1,188 wins
- Brian Bolinger, official in the National Football League
- Joe Bottiglieri, college football coach
- Cheryl Bridges, women's marathon world record holder, Dec 1971-Dec 1973
- Jim Brumfield, former professional football player for the Pittsburgh Steelers
- Billy Clapper, head coach, men's basketball Penn State Altoona
- Roger Counsil, NCAA champion gymnastic coach; former head USA Gymnastics
- Wayne Davis, former professional football player for the San Diego Chargers, Buffalo Bills, and Washington Redskins
- Brian Dorsett, former Major League Baseball player for the Cleveland Indians, California Angels, New York Yankees, San Diego Padres, Cincinnati Reds, and Chicago Cubs
- David Doster, former Major League Baseball player
- Benita Edds, archer
- Loren Ellis, football and basketball coach
- Steve Englehart, head coach, Presbyterian Blue Hose
- Stewart “Red” Faught, head coach, football, Franklin College
- Mike Gardiner, former Major League Baseball player
- Tom Gilles, former Major League Baseball player
- Margaret Gisolo, first girl to play American Legion baseball
- Vencie Glenn, professional football player
- Alex Graman, former Major League Baseball player
- Rick Grapenthin, former Major League Baseball player
- Robert Griswold, Paralympic swimmer
- Terry Hall (1944–1997), women's basketball coach at Eastern Kentucky University, University of Louisville, University of Kentucky and Wright State University
- Mitch Hannahs, head coach, Indiana State Sycamores
- Bill Hayes, former Major League Baseball player & coach
- John Hazen, professional basketball player
- Tunch Ilkin, professional football player
- Blaise Ilsley, former Major League Baseball player
- Jeff James, Major League Baseball player
- Tommy John, retired Major League Baseball player
- Chad Johnston, NASCAR crew chief
- Harold Johnson, professional basketball player
- Wallace Johnson, former Major League Baseball player
- Bill Jones, football coach
- Doug Kay, professional football coach
- Beverly Kearney, head coach, University of Texas women's track and field team
- Duane Klueh, professional basketball player, former head coach of men's basketball, tennis at Indiana State University
- Danny Lazar, former Major League Baseball player
- Bryan Leturgez, Olympic bobsledder; bronze medalist - 1993 World Championships
- John MacLeod, NBA, NCAA Head Basketball Coach
- Sean Manaea, Major League Baseball player
- Pancho Martin, professional football player
- Thad Matta, head coach, men's basketball; Ohio State University
- Carl Nicks, professional basketball player
- Jake Odum, professional basketball player, European Leagues (2014–2019); collegiate basketball coach (2019-pres)
- Brian Omogrosso, former Major League Baseball player
- Jake Petricka, Major League Baseball player
- La Ferne Price, All-American Girls Professional Baseball League player; ISU alumni and coach, women's softball and swimming squads
- Colin Rea, Major League Baseball player
- Jerry Reynolds, professional basketball coach, general manager
- Bob Royer, professional basketball player
- Micah Shrewsberry, head coach, Penn State Nittany Lions
- Chuck Smith, former Major League Baseball player
- Steve Smith, silver medalist, high jump, 1995 Pan Am Games
- Zane Smith, former Major League Baseball player
- Dan Sparks, professional basketball player; NJCAA champion coach
- Mitch Stetter, Kansas City Royals, Major League Baseball coach
- Ryan Strausborger, former Major League Baseball player
- Ryan Tatusko, professional baseball player
- Joe Thatcher, former Major League Baseball player
- Kurt Thomas, Olympic participant, gymnastics; James E. Sullivan Award
- Robert Tonyan, National Football League player (Green Bay Packers)
- Bobby Turner, Atlanta Falcons, assistant coach (running backs)
- Jayson Wells (born 1976), basketball player
- Paul "Billy" Williams, athletic director, Indiana State Muncee Hoosieroons (1921–1958)
- John Wooden, college basketball player and Hall of Fame college coach
- Andy Young, Major League Baseball player

== Notable faculty ==
- William Ashbrook
- James Chesebro
- Robert Clouse
- Jeffrey S. Harper
- Kenneth T. Henson
- Leroy Lamis, sculptor
- Charles Nicol
- Edward A. Pease, member, House of Representatives, Indiana 7th District, 1997–2001
- Michael Shelden, biographer
- Todd Whitaker

== Presidents ==
- William Albert Jones (1869–1879)
- George Pliny Brown (1879–1885)
- William Wood Parsons (1885–1921), LL.D., DePauw University
- Linnaeus Neal Hines (1921–1933), M.A., Cornell University
- Ralph Noble Tirey (1934–1953), M.A., Indiana University
- Dr. Raleigh Warren Holmstedt (1953–1965), Ph.D., Columbia Teachers College, Columbia University
- Dr. Alan Carson Rankin (1965–1975), D.S.Sc., Syracuse University
- Dr. Richard George Landini (1975–1992), Ph.D., University of Florida
- Dr. John Moore (1992–2000), Ph.D., Pennsylvania State University
- Dr. Lloyd W. Benjamin III (2000–2008) Ph.D., University of North Carolina
- Dr. Daniel J. Bradley (2008–2018) Ph.D., Michigan State University
- Dr. Deborah J. Curtis (2018–2024) Ph.D., Indiana State University
- Dr. Michael. Godard (2024–present) Ph.D., Ball State University
