= Jimoh =

Jimoh is a Yoruba surname and given name relating to the Friday prayer in Islam. Notable people with the name include:

surname

- Ade Jimoh (born 1980), American football player
- Funmi Jimoh (born 1984), American long jumper
- Hogan Jimoh (born 1955), Nigerian boxer
- Luqman Jimoh, Nigerian academic
- Pius Lasisi Jimoh (1950–2014), Nigeriann businessman
- Seun Sean Jimoh, Nigerian actor
- Sherif Jimoh (born 1996), Ivorian football player
- Shola Jimoh (born 2008), Canadian football player
- Toheeb Jimoh (born 1997), English actor

given name

- Jimoh Akolo (1934–2023), Nigerian artist
- Jimoh Aliu (1939–2020), Nigerian dramatist, sculptor and screenwriter
- Jimoh Buraimoh (born 1943), Nigerian artist
- Jimoh Ibrahim (born 1967), Nigerian lawyer, politician, businessman
