= Rose Hill Farmstead =

- Formerly listed on the U.S. National Register of Historic Places
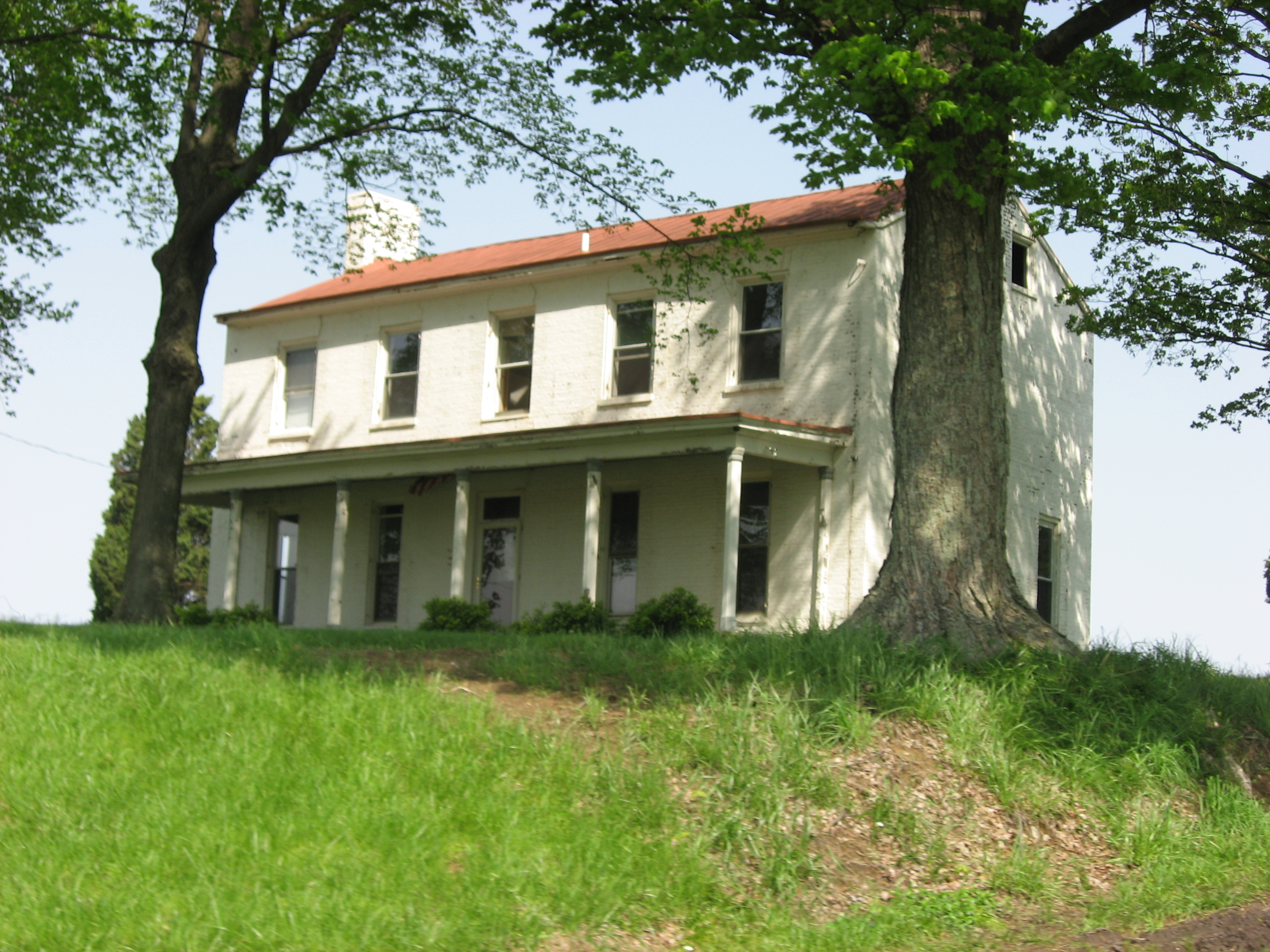
- Rose Hill Farmstead, April 2011
- Location: Old Louisville Rd, 0.25 miles north of its junction with Old Wheatland Rd., and east of Vincennes in Palmyra Township, Knox County, Indiana
- Area: 4 acres (1.6 ha)
- Built: 1827
- Architectural style: Federal, I-House
- NRHP reference No.: 95000202

Significant dates
- Added to NRHP: March 3, 1995
- Removed from NRHP: June 15, 2012

Rose Hill Farmstead, also known as the Rose—Wise—Patterson Farm, was a historic home and farm located near Vincennes in Palmyra Township, Knox County, Indiana. The original farmhouse as built in 1807 by Martin Rose. This house was replaced in 1827 by a two-story, Federal style brick I-house which was built by Rose's son, Matthias Rose. It had a rear ell added in 1829 and was remodeled about 1890. Also on the property were a contributing silo, summer kitchen, two barns, garage chicken coop, and tool or storage shed. It has been demolished.

The property was originally part of 400 acres that was granted to Jean Baptiste St. Aubin by the U.S. Congress for his support of the American Revolution. St. Aubin assigned his rights to the property to Peyton Short of Woodford County, Kentucky. Short would sell the property to Martin Rose in 1807. The farmstead grew to 800 acres when Rose bought an additional 400 acres from future U.S. President William Henry Harrison. A small fort, known as Rose's Fort, was built around one of the property's springs during the War of 1812 but it was never attacked.

After the death of Rose the property passed to his son Matthias in 1828. Unfortunately, Matthias died in 1834 and the house and a portion of the property was sold to his sister Malinda and her husband, Henry K. Wise. Mr. Wise was an abolitionist and the house became a stop on the Underground Railroad. When the Wises died the property passed to their daughter Nancy and her husband Robert B. Patterson. Their son, George Martin Patterson, would later attend Vincennes University and become a founder of Sigma Pi fraternity in 1897. When George died in 1960 he left the property to his daughters Marion Beard and Martha Parks.

Marion lived in the house until her death in 1988. She bequeathed the house and many of the family's belongings to the fraternity. In 1992, the Sigma Pi Educational Foundation bought the property from the fraternity and established a memorial to the Patterson family on it. The foundation planned to move its offices to the building and establish an alumni center on the property.

The property could be seen from nearby Shadowwood, which served as the fraternity's headquarters from 1963 to 2003.

It was added to the National Register of Historic Places in 1995 and delisted in 2012.
