= Shadowwood =

Historic house in Indiana, United States

- U.S. National Register of Historic Places
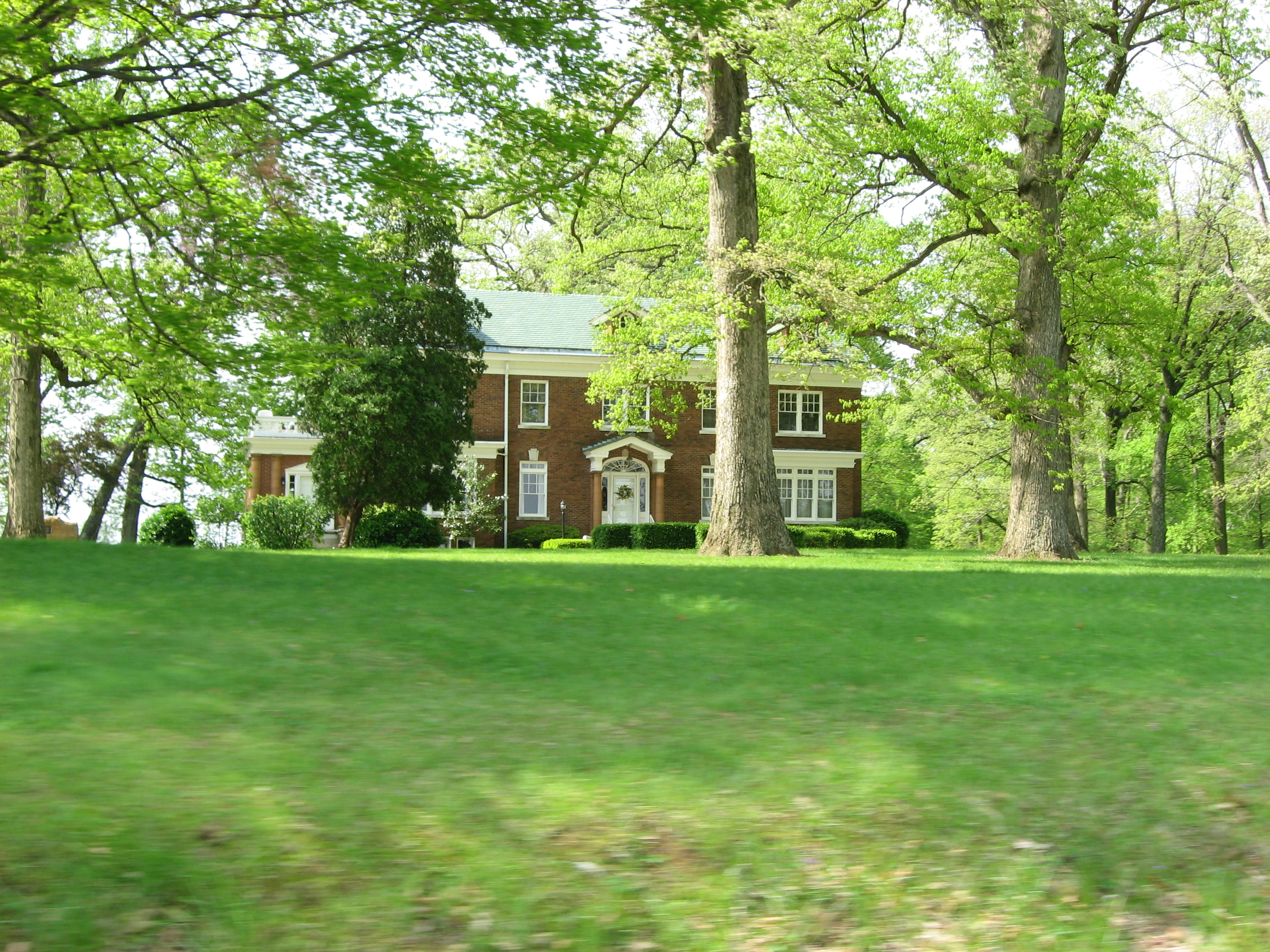
- Shadowwood, April 2011

- Location within Indiana Location within the United States
- Location: 6451 E. Wheatland Rd., east of Vincennes in Palmyra Township, Knox County, Indiana
- Coordinates: 38°41′59″N 87°25′06″W
- Area: 13 acres (5.3 ha)
- Built: 1917
- Architect: John W. Gaddis
- Architectural style: Colonial Revival
- NRHP reference No.: 01000618
- Added to NRHP: June 6, 2001

Shadowwood, also known as the Wharf Estate, is a historic estate located in Palmyra Township, Knox County, Indiana. The house was built on land purchased from Robert B. Patterson on what had been part of the Rose Hill Farmstead. The main house was built in 1917, and is a 2 1/2-story, five-bay, Colonial Revival style brick dwelling built for Col. Eugene C. Wharf. It has a side-gabled tile roof. The south facade features a two-story portico with a second story sleeping porch. Also on the property are the contributing pump house (1917), carriage house (1917), and chicken house (c. 1945).

During the American Civil War it was rumored that the Knights of the Golden Circle met on the hill where the house now stands as it was, at the time, a dense forest. The property became known as Rebel Hill. Colonel Wharf was a veteran of the Spanish–American War and very patriotic. He disapproved of the name and had the name Shadowwood recorded at the county court house.

When Colonel Wharf died his widow, Mrs. Stella C. Wharf, conveyed the family home to Vincennes University as a memorial in 1957. The university did use the property for several years to house female students. The house was around ten miles from the university so it was impractical for its use. At the suggestion of Judge Curtis Shake, president of the VU Board of Trustees, university president Dr. Isaac K. Beckes worked to transfer the property to The Grand Chapter of the Sigma Pi fraternity for use as its national headquarters in August 1961. The fraternity had been founded at the university in 1897. Mrs. Wharf approved of the deal.

The fraternity spent $11,500 in 1962 to upgrade the building's heating, plumbing, and electricity. The carriage house was converted into a lodge where the fraternity's traveling consultants could live. The building housed the International Headquarters of Sigma Pi fraternity from 1963 to 2003. In 2005, the fraternity sold the property to a private individual.

It was added to the National Register of Historic Places in 2001.
