= Goodykoontz =

Goodykoontz is a surname. Notable people with the surname include:

- Bess Goodykoontz (1894–1990), American educator
- Frank Goodykoontz (1842–1898), American politician from Iowa
- Jasper Goodykoontz (1855–1923), American writer
- Wells Goodykoontz (1872–1844), American politician from West Virginia
