= French Lick, Indiana =

- Town
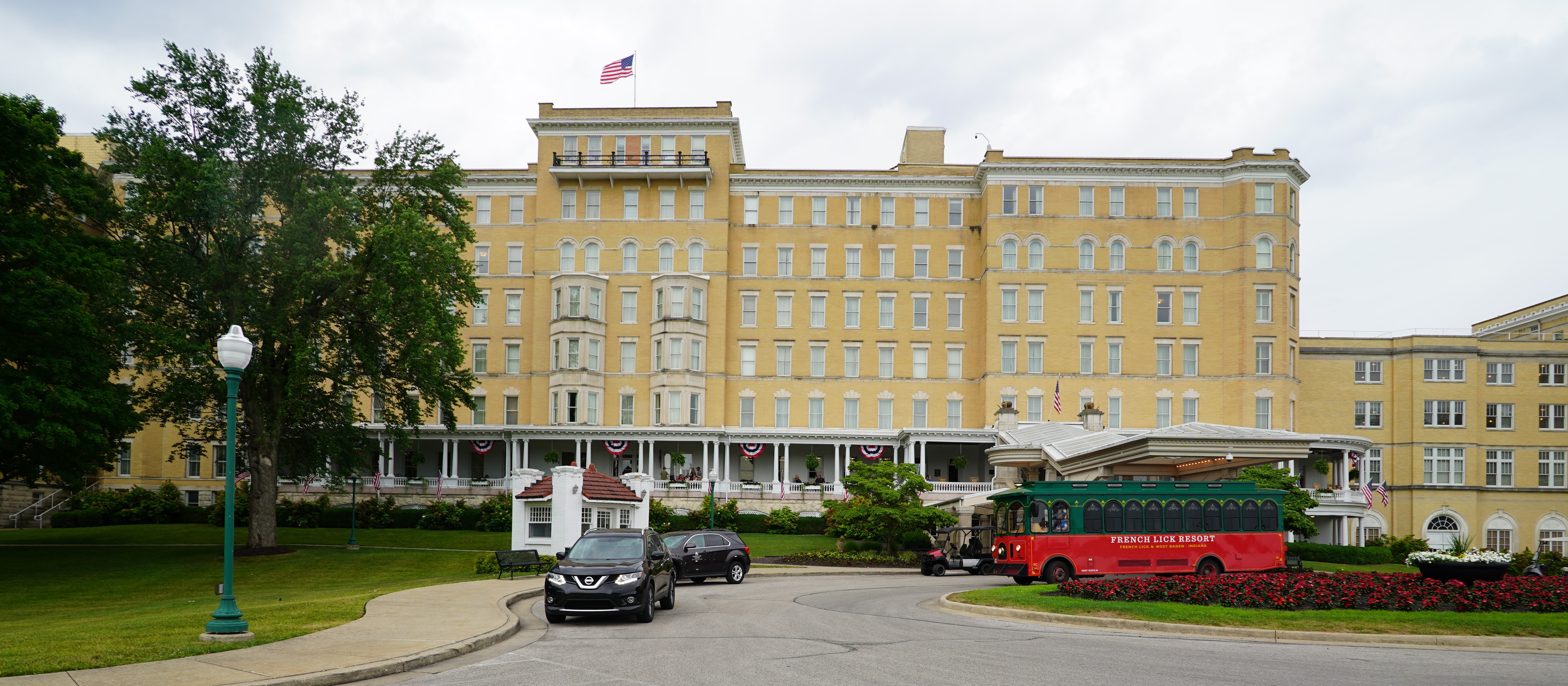
- French Lick Springs Hotel

- Location within Indiana and Orange County
- Coordinates: 38°32′46″N 86°37′13″W
- Country: United States
- State: Indiana
- County: Orange
- Township: French Lick

Area
  - Total: 1.82 sq mi (4.72 km^{2})
  - Land: 1.82 sq mi (4.72 km^{2})
  - Water: 0 sq mi (0.00 km^{2})
- Elevation: 568 ft (173 m)

Population (2020)
  - Total: 1,722
  - Density: 945/sq mi (365/km^{2})
- Time zone: UTC−5 (EST)
  - Summer (DST): UTC−4 (EDT)
- ZIP Code: 47432
- Area code: 812
- FIPS code: 18-25972
- GNIS ID: 2396952
- Website: www.townoffrenchlick.com

French Lick is a town in French Lick Township, Orange County, Indiana, United States. The population was 1,722 at the time of the 2020 census.

== History ==
French Lick was originally a French trading post built near a spring and salt lick. A fortified ranger post was established near the springs in 1811. On Johnson's 1837 map of Indiana, the community was known as Salt Spring. The town was founded in 1857. French Lick's post office has been in operation since 1847.

The sulfur springs were commercially exploited for medical benefits starting in 1840. By the latter half of the 19th century, French Lick was famous in the United States as a spa town. In the early 20th century it also featured casinos attracting celebrities such as boxer Joe Louis, composer Irving Berlin, and gangster Al Capone.

Because of wartime travel restrictions, the Chicago Cubs and Chicago White Sox held spring training in French Lick from 1943 to 1944; in 1945 the Cubs stayed in town while the White Sox moved to Terre Haute, utilizing Memorial Stadium. In order to conserve rail transport during World War II, 1943 spring training was limited to an area east of the Mississippi River and north of the Ohio River.

The French Lick Resort Casino was the focal point of most of the entertainment; the hotel remained open well after the casinos were closed down and the heyday of the town was well past. The resort closed for renovation in 2005 and re-opened in 2006.

Pluto Water, a best-selling laxative of the first half of the 20th century, was bottled here. It was also home to a large 7 Up bottling facility, which ceased operations in the mid-20th century.

Franklin D. Roosevelt announced his intention to run for president in June 1931 at a National Governors' Convention held at the French Lick Springs Hotel.

In 2015, the Pete Dye Course at French Lick Resort played host to the KitchenAid Senior PGA Championship.

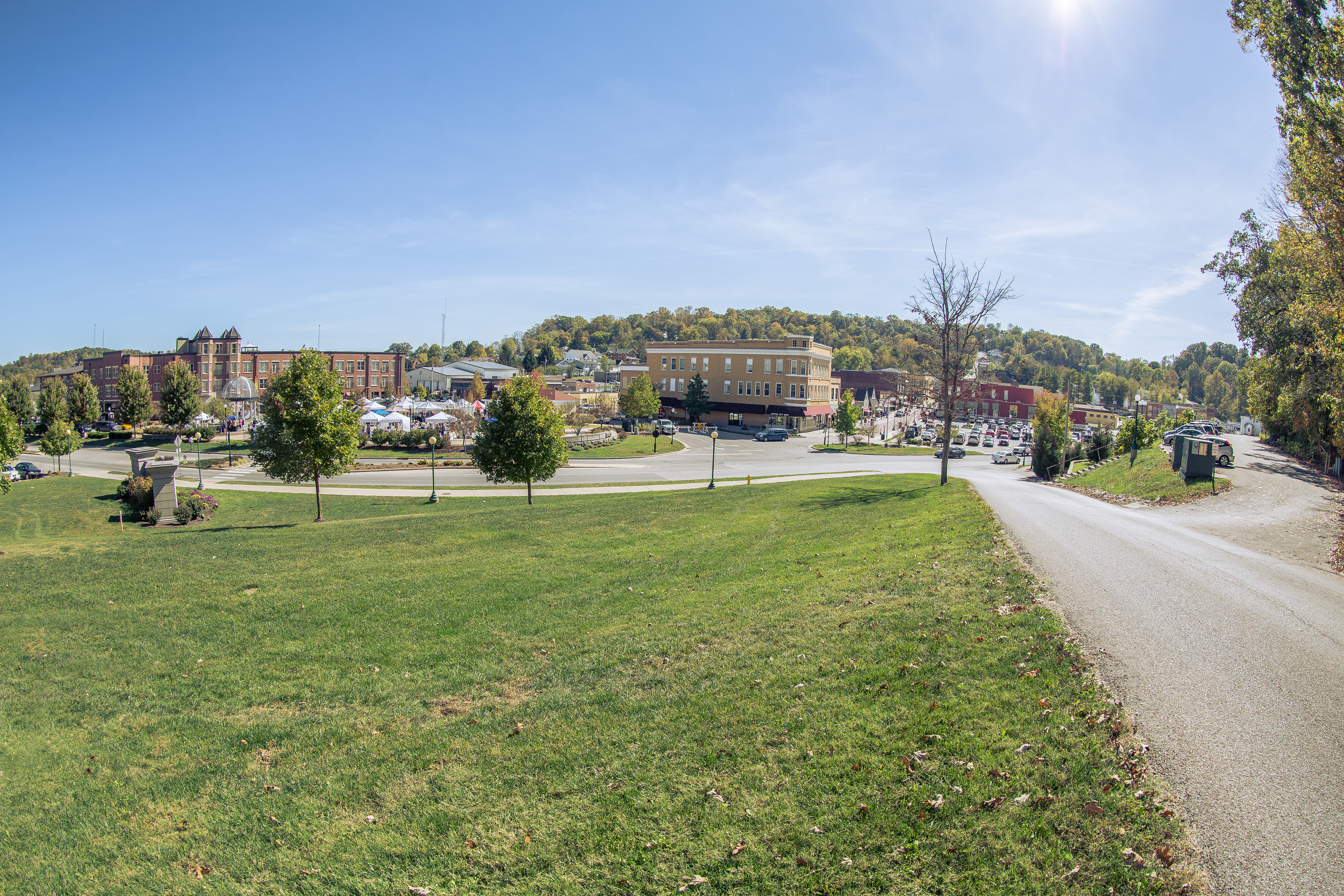
Photo from Small Town Indiana photo survey.

== Geography ==
According to the 2010 census, French Lick has a total area of 1.77 square miles (4.58 km^{2}), all land.

== Demographics ==
Historical population
Census	Pop.	Note	%±
1900	260		—
1910	1,803		593.5%
1920	1,980		9.8%
1930	2,462		24.3%
1940	2,042		−17.1%
1950	1,946		−4.7%
1960	1,954		0.4%
1970	2,059		5.4%
1980	2,265		10.0%
1990	2,087		−7.9%
2000	1,941		−7.0%
2010	1,807		−6.9%
2020	1,722		−4.7%
U.S. Decennial Census

=== 2020 census ===
As of the 2020 census, French Lick had a population of 1,722. The median age was 42.1 years. 22.0% of residents were under the age of 18 and 22.6% of residents were 65 years of age or older. For every 100 females there were 97.9 males, and for every 100 females age 18 and over there were 92.0 males age 18 and over.

0.0% of residents lived in urban areas, while 100.0% lived in rural areas.

There were 762 households in French Lick, of which 26.8% had children under the age of 18 living in them. Of all households, 31.0% were married-couple households, 24.8% were households with a male householder and no spouse or partner present, and 35.4% were households with a female householder and no spouse or partner present. About 42.2% of all households were made up of individuals and 18.9% had someone living alone who was 65 years of age or older.

There were 898 housing units, of which 15.1% were vacant. The homeowner vacancy rate was 2.2% and the rental vacancy rate was 5.6%.

Racial composition as of the 2020 census
Race	Number	Percent
White	1,457	84.6%
Black or African American	102	5.9%
American Indian and Alaska Native	8	0.5%
Asian	19	1.1%
Native Hawaiian and Other Pacific Islander	4	0.2%
Some other race	21	1.2%
Two or more races	111	6.4%
Hispanic or Latino (of any race)	65	3.8%

=== 2010 census ===
As of the census of 2010, there were 1,807 people, 764 households, and 439 families living in the town. The population density was 1,020.9 inhabitants per square mile (394.2/km^{2}). There were 924 housing units at an average density of 522.0 per square mile (201.5/km^{2}). The racial makeup of the town was 88.8% White, 5.8% African American, 0.3% Native American, 1.2% Asian, 0.9% from other races, and 2.9% from two or more races. Hispanic or Latino of any race were 2.1% of the population.

There were 764 households, of which 30.4% had children under the age of 18 living with them, 35.6% were married couples living together, 15.6% had a female householder with no husband present, 6.3% had a male householder with no wife present, and 42.5% were non-families. 36.4% of all households were made up of individuals, and 16.2% had someone living alone who was 65 years of age or older. The average household size was 2.27 and the average family size was 2.93.

The median age in the town was 39.2 years. 24% of residents were under the age of 18; 7.6% were between the ages of 18 and 24; 24.6% were from 25 to 44; 25.4% were from 45 to 64; and 18.4% were 65 years of age or older. The gender makeup of the town was 46.9% male and 53.1% female.

=== 2000 census ===
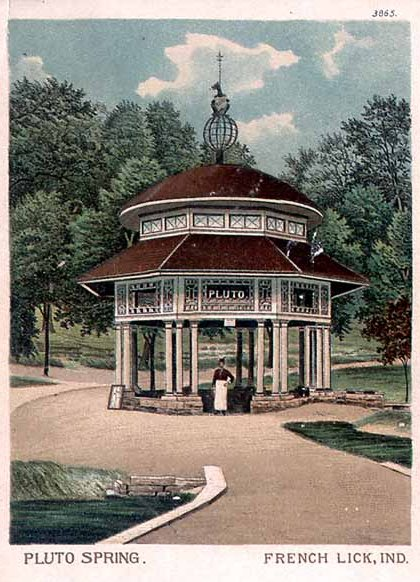
"Pluto Spring", French Lick, 1903

As of the census of 2000, there were 1,941 people, 849 households, and 513 families living in the town. The population density was 1,196.3 inhabitants per square mile (461.9/km^{2}). There were 948 housing units at an average density of 584.3 per square mile (225.6/km^{2}). The racial makeup of the town was 94.18% White, 3.66% African American, 0.26% Native American, 0.41% Asian, 0.26% from other races, and 1.24% from two or more races. Hispanic or Latino of any race were 0.46% of the population.

There were 849 households, out of which 25.7% had children under the age of 18 living with them, 43.6% were married couples living together, 12.5% had a female householder with no husband present, and 39.5% were non-families. 35.2% of all households were made up of individuals, and 18.0% had someone living alone who was 65 years of age or older. The average household size was 2.21 and the average family size was 2.81.

In the town, the population was spread out, with 22.0% under the age of 18, 8.6% from 18 to 24, 26.0% from 25 to 44, 22.9% from 45 to 64, and 20.6% who were 65 years of age or older. The median age was 40 years. For every 100 females, there were 91.8 males. For every 100 females age 18 and over, there were 87.6 males.

The median income for a household in the town was $27,197, and the median income for a family was $36,583. Males had a median income of $26,046 versus $17,346 for females. The per capita income for the town was $15,113. About 11.8% of families and 18.7% of the population were below the poverty line, including 33.7% of those under age 18 and 17.8% of those age 65 or over.

== Education ==
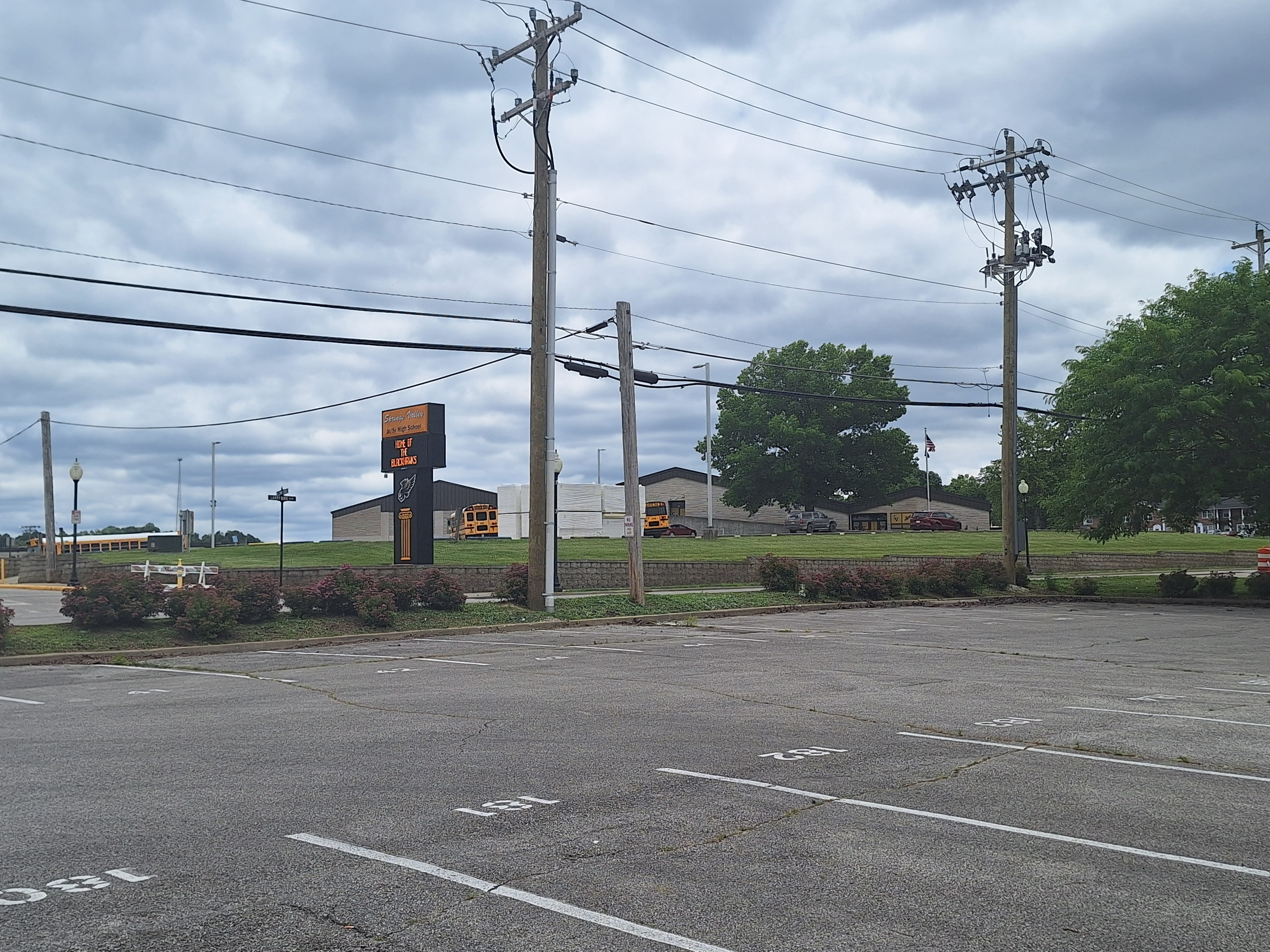
Springs Valley Junior-Senior High School

It is in the Springs Valley Community School Corporation. The zoned secondary school is Springs Valley High School (junior and senior high school).

The Springs Valley district was formed in 1957, when the schools of French Lick and West Baden consolidated. French Lick High School was established in 1909, and it consolidated in 1957. French Lick had the "Red Devils" as a mascot, based on Pluto, the ruler of the underworld in Greek mythology. The school colors were red and white. Prior to the consolidation, French Lick and West Baden Springs high schools were athletic rivals.

The town has a lending library, the Melton Public Library.

== Notable people ==
- Larry Bird, professional basketball player. Bird started at the high school team of Springs Valley High School, where he left as the school's all-time scoring leader; he became nicknamed "the Hick from French Lick"
- Jerry Reynolds, former Sacramento Kings head coach
