= Pluto Water =

Mineral water laxative

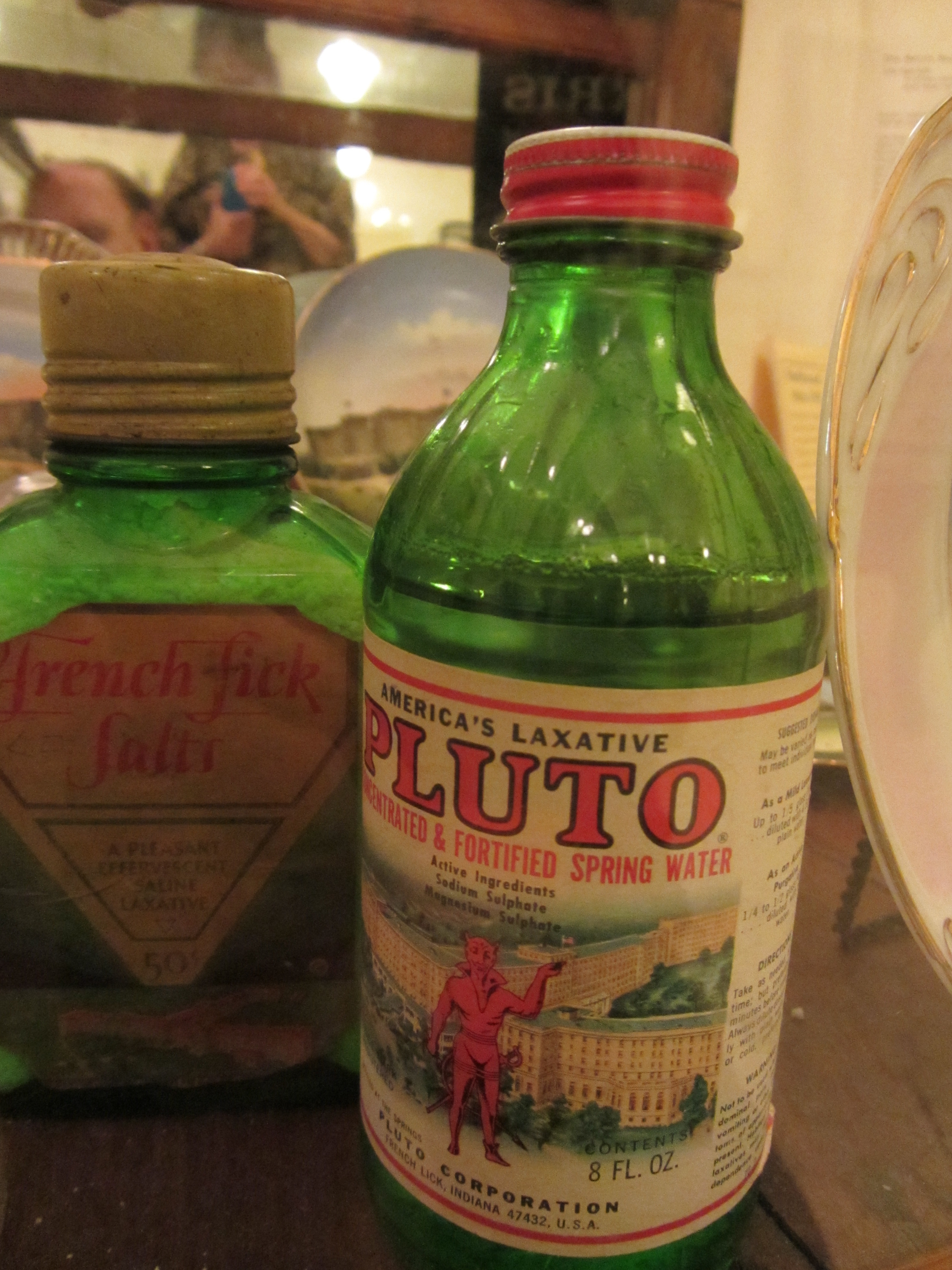
Antique bottle of Pluto Water

Pluto Water was a trademark for a strongly laxative natural water product which was marketed in the United States in the early 20th century. The water's laxative properties were from its high native content of mineral salts, with the active ingredient listed as sodium and magnesium sulfate, which are known as natural laxatives. The water's high native content of mineral salts generally made it effective within one hour of ingestion, a fact the company emphasized in their promotional literature. Company advertisements stated the laxative was effective from a half-hour to two hours after ingestion. In 1919, it took 450 railroad cars to transport the bottler's output.

== Distribution ==
The water was bottled at the French Lick Springs, in French Lick, Indiana, a location with natural mineral springs that was also the source of the competing Sprudel Water.

== Laxative properties ==
The water's high native content of mineral salts generally made it effective as a laxative within one hour of ingestion, a point emphasized in the company's promotional literature. Company advertisements stated the laxative was effective from a half-hour to two hours after ingestion. The active ingredient of Pluto water was listed as sodium and magnesium sulfate, which are known as natural laxatives. The water also contains a number of other minerals, most notably lithium salts. Many believe that the sale of Pluto water was halted in 1971 when lithium became a controlled substance, but naturally occurring lithium never came under such regulations.

== Advertising ==
Advertised as "America's Laxative", Pluto Water used the slogan "When Nature Won't, PLUTO Will". The bottle and many advertisements featured an image of Pluto, the Roman god of the underworld, reflecting the water's underground origin.

== Popular culture ==
- Charles Butterworth's character in the 1931 movie Illicit, mentions Pluto Water, when making a "Toast to water" then listing different waters.
- Pluto Water was the main subject of the novel So Cold the River (2010) by Michael Koryta.
- In Sanford and Son season 3, episode 7, Grady (Whitman Mayo) mentions Pluto Water to Julio (Gregory Sierra). Also in season 1 Fred mentions Pluto Water to Lamont.
- Louis Armstrong writes about his mother giving him Pluto Water to help cure lockjaw in the first chapter of his autobiography, "Satchmo, My Life in New Orleans".
- Kurt Vonnegut references Pluto water in his first novel, “Player Piano,” in chapter 28, while setting the scene of the dystopian tavern ‘The Dutch,’ where: “in almost every hand was the drink fashionable that season, benedictine and Pluto water, with a sprig of mint.”
- Advertisements for Pluto water are seen several times in the 1924 film Greed by Erich von Stroheim. In the restored version, a small ad hangs over Marcus' bed, and a large ad can be seen in the train stop shed in the scene where Mcteague and Trina go to escape a sudden downpour. Also, a bottle of Pluto water can be seen on the bedside table in the scene where Trina tells Mcteague that her mother has written to her, asking for money.

== Gallery ==
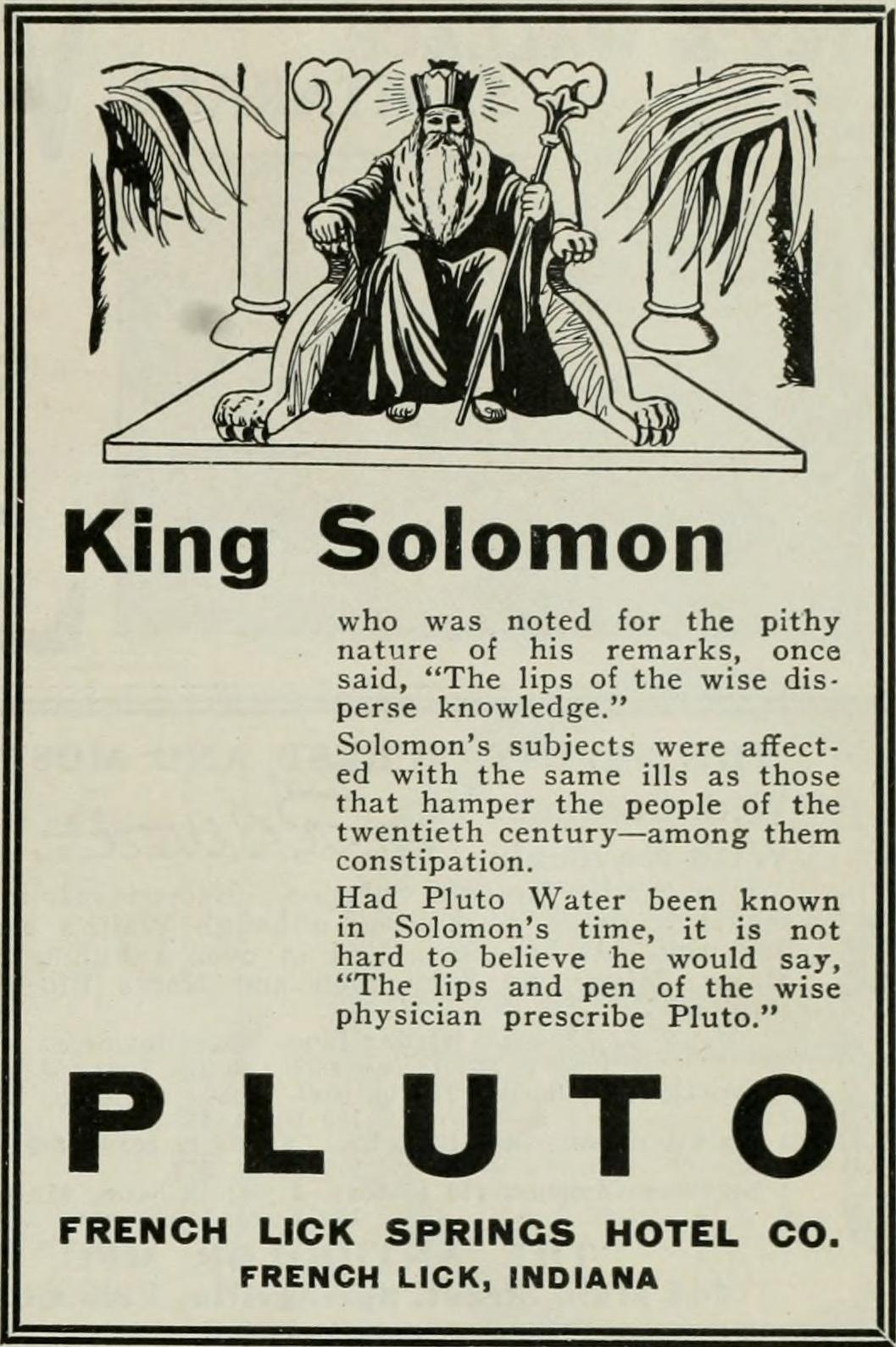
Pluto Water ad detail in 1894

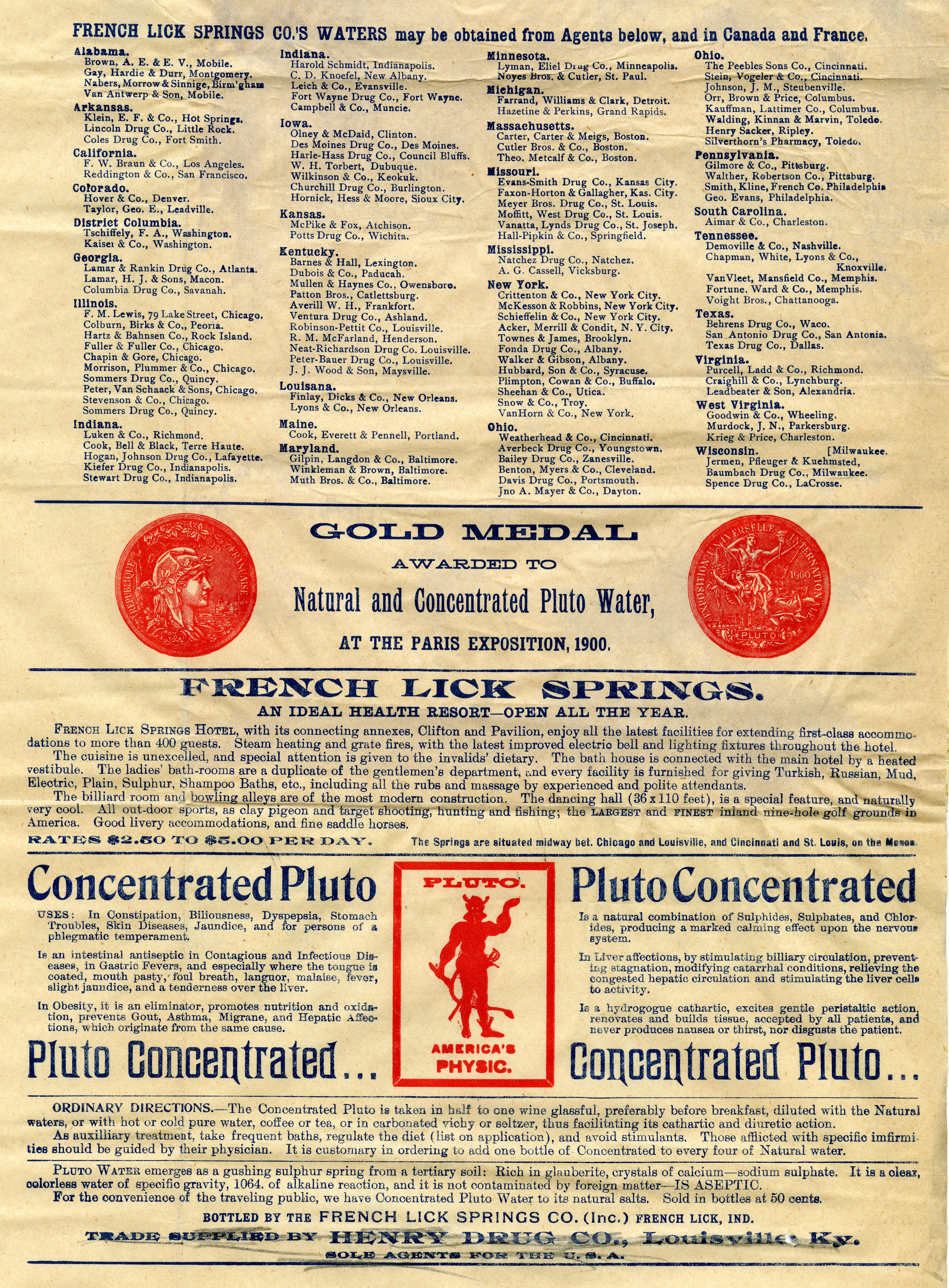
Pluto Concentrated Water label, French Lick, Indiana, 1901

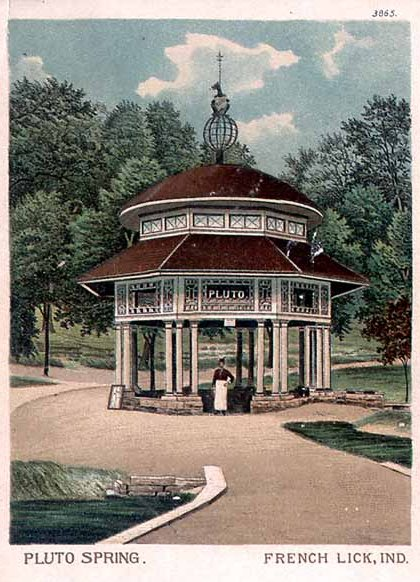
"Pluto Spring", French Lick, 1903

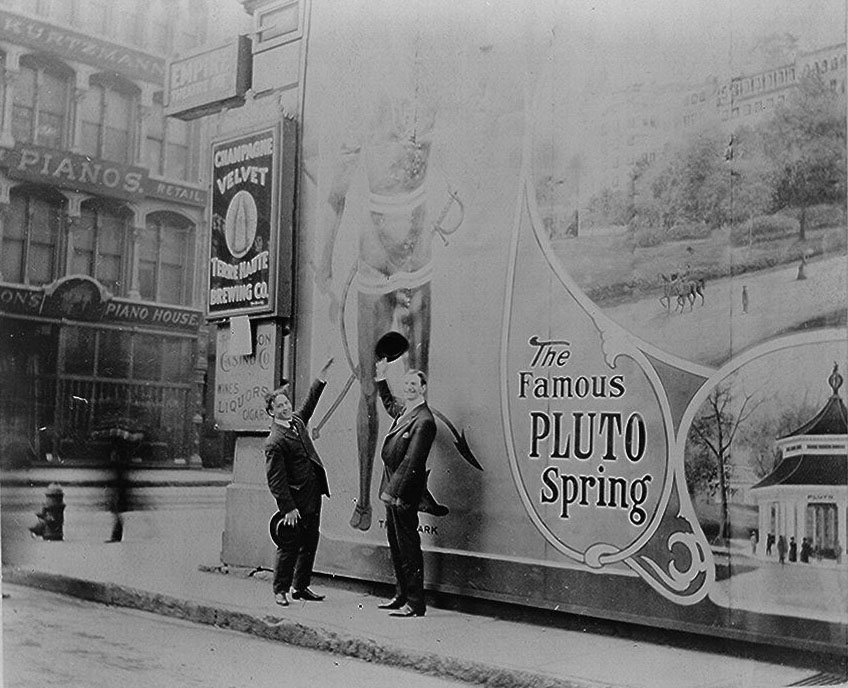
Escape artist Harry Houdini (left) posing near Pluto Spring poster, c.1907

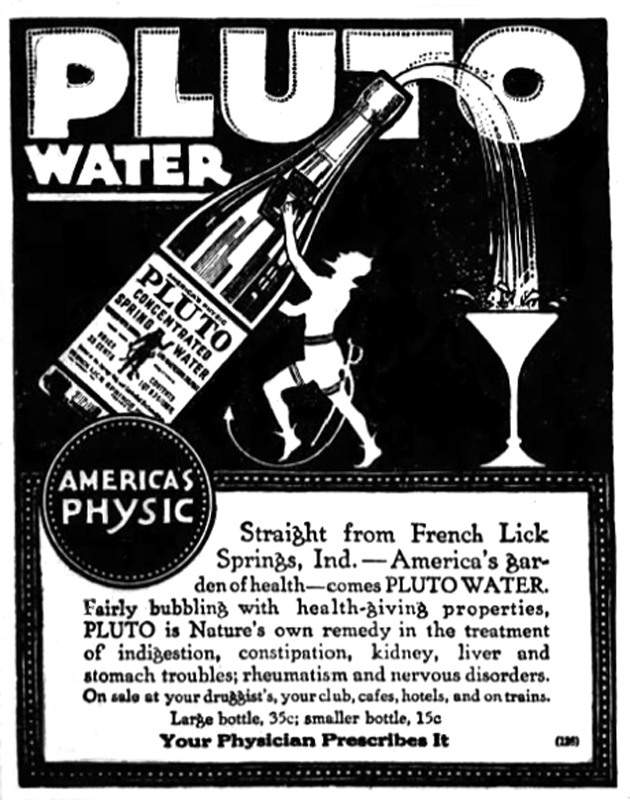
Newspaper advertisement, 1918

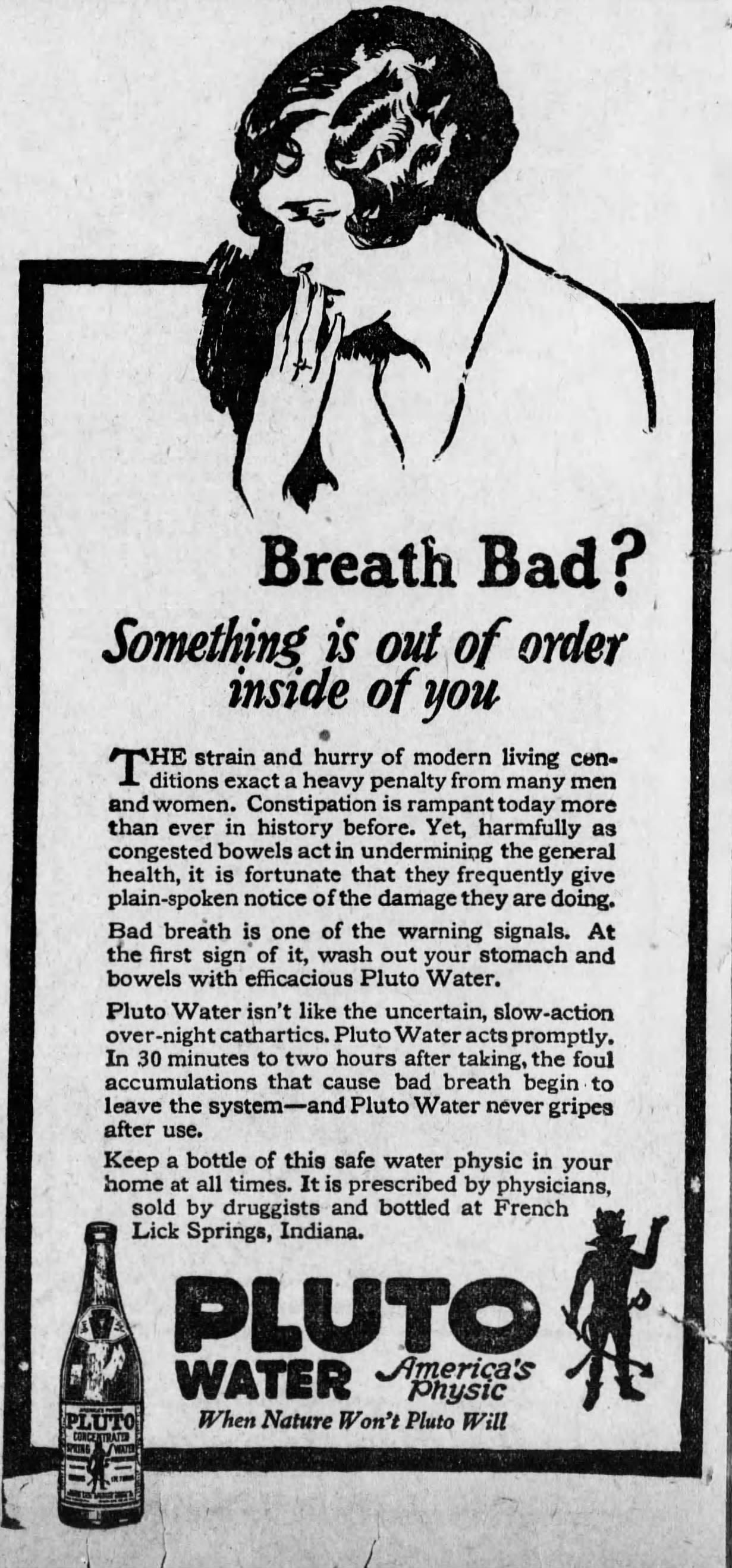
Bad breath Pluto Water ad, 1925

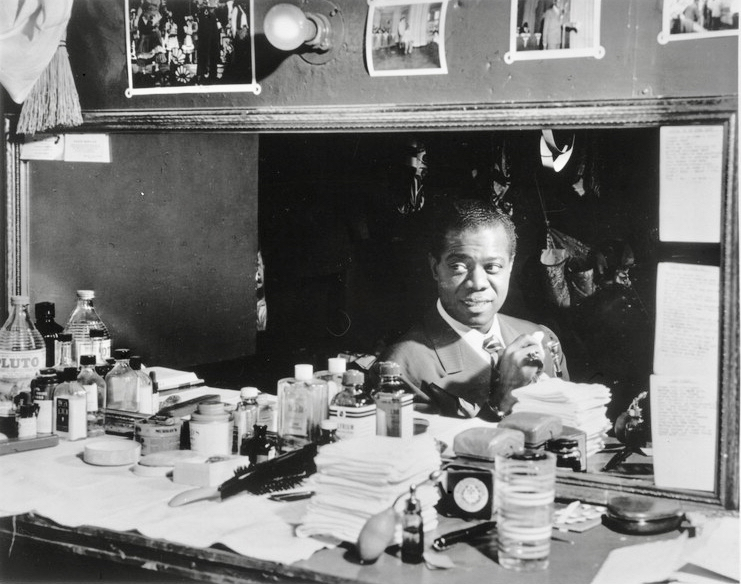
Louis Armstrong in his dressing room, a bottle of Pluto Water at left, 1946

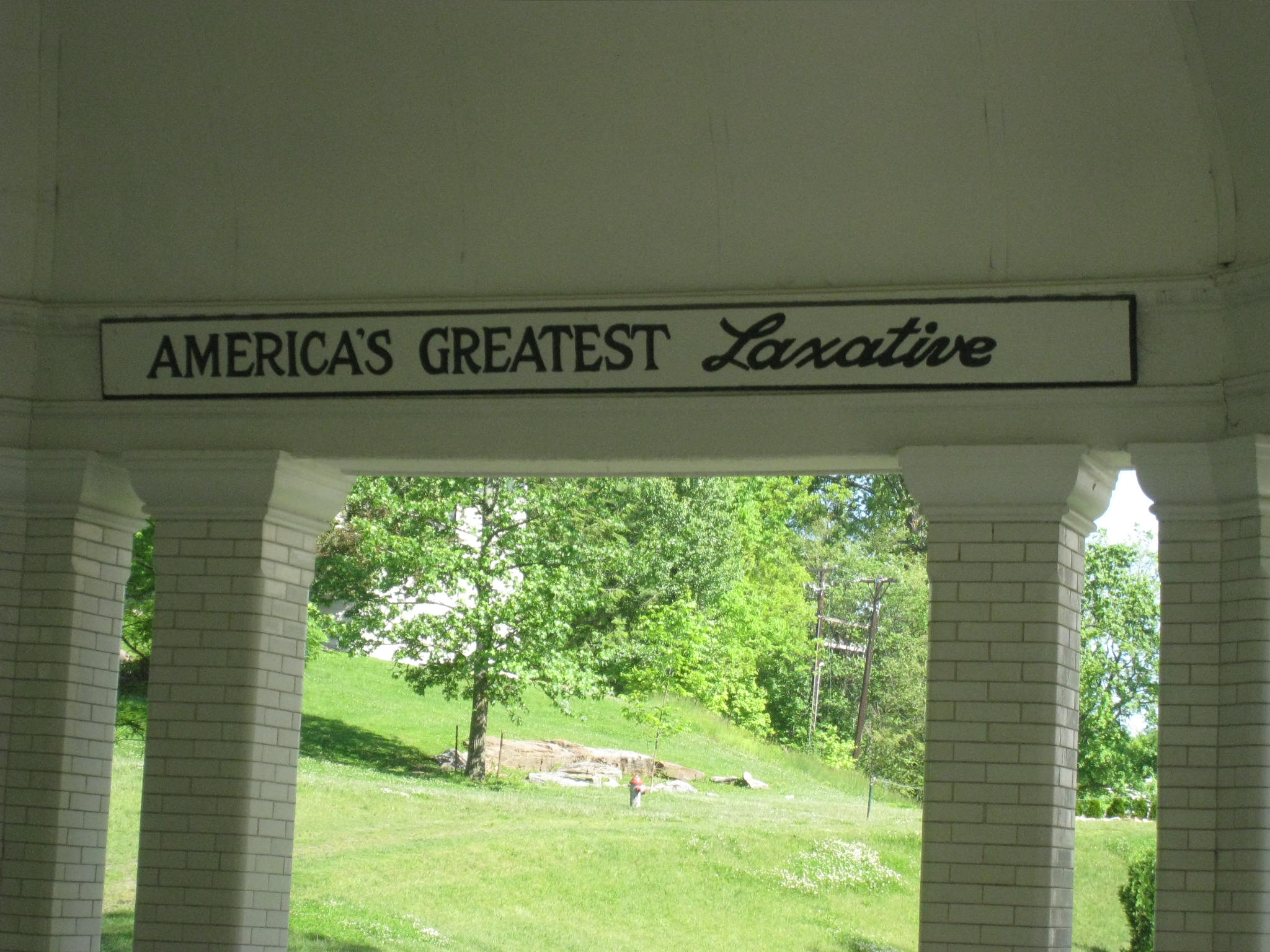
"America's Greatest Laxative"

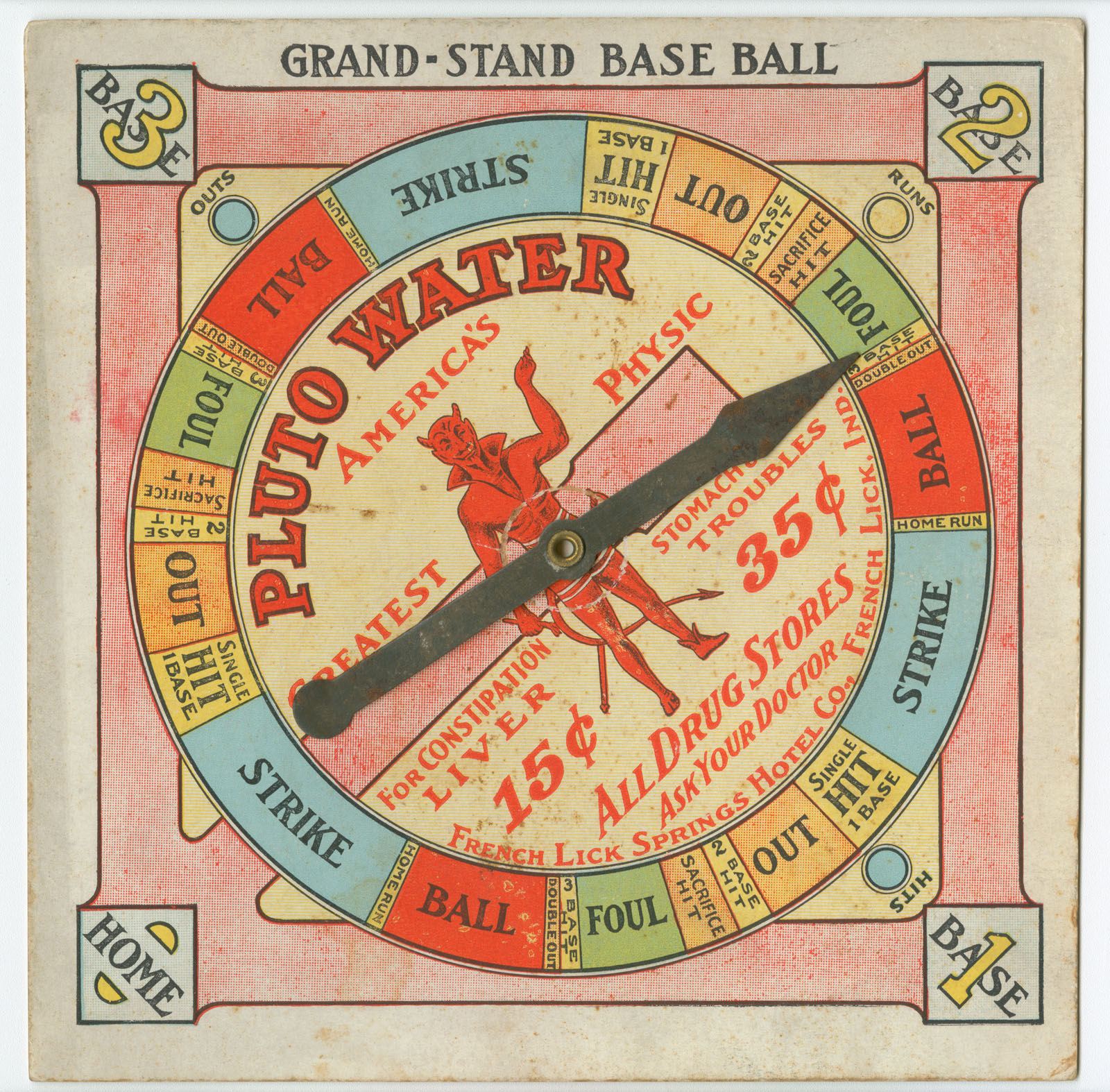
Grand-stand baseball (graphic) - Pluto Water. America's greatest physic for constipation, stomach and kidney, liver troubles. 15 (cents). 35 (cents). All drug stores. Ask your doctor. c.1895

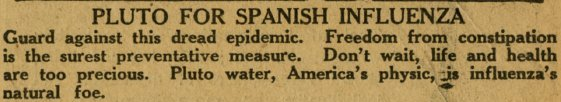
"PLUTO FOR SPANISH INFLUENZA" "Guard against this dread epidemic" "Pluto water, America's physic, is influenza's natural foe" detail, from- Pluto Water 1918 For Spanish Flu

== See also ==
- Lithia water
