= Jerry Reynolds (basketball, born 1944) =

American executive and former basketball coach (b. 1944)

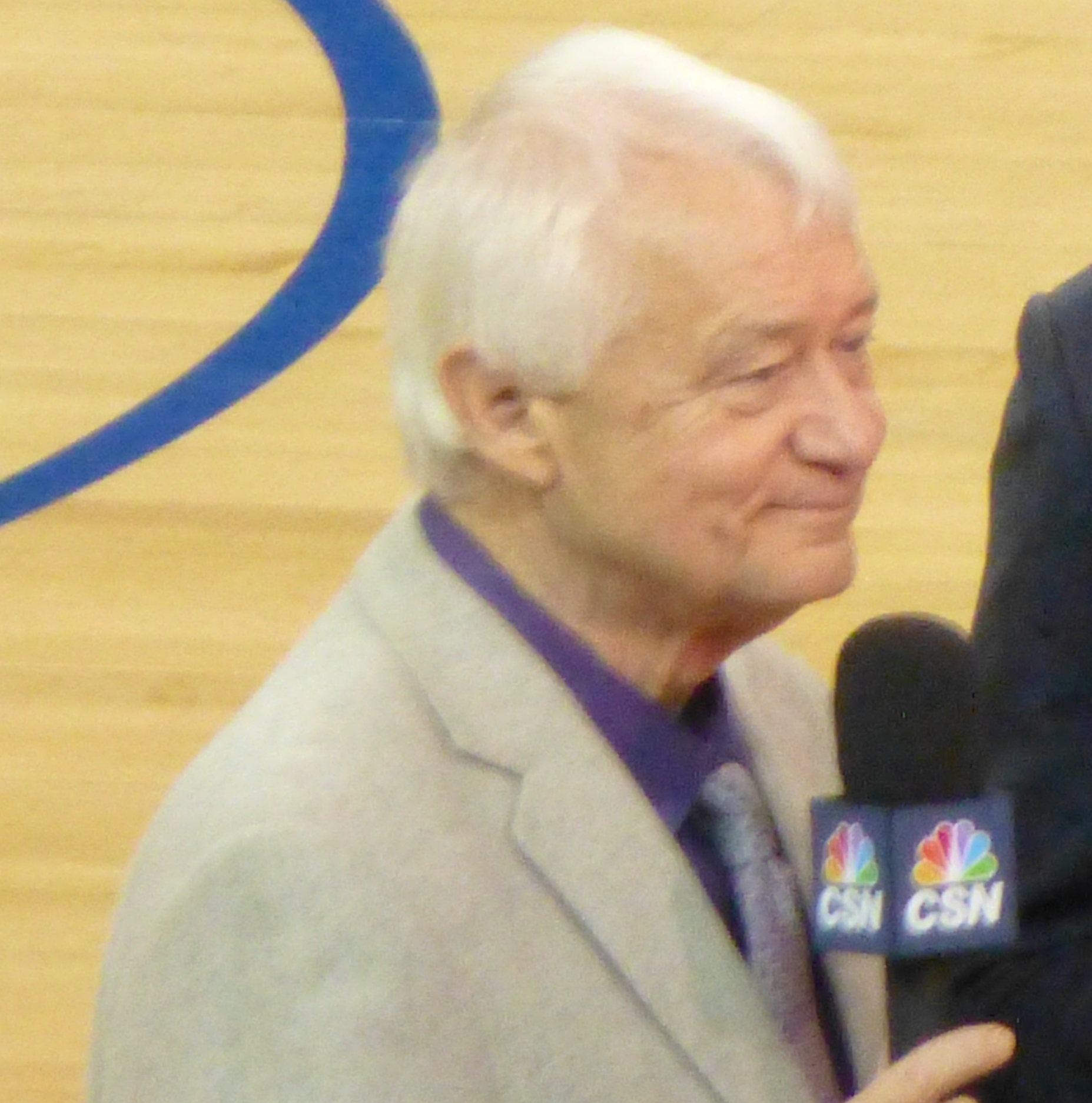

Personal information
- Born: January 29, 1944 (age 82) French Lick, Indiana, U.S.
- Listed height: 5 ft 9 in (1.75 m)
- Listed weight: 175 lb (79 kg)

Career information
- High school: Springs Valley (French Lick, Indiana)
- College: Vincennes (1962–1964); Oakland City (1964–1966)
- Coaching career: 1965–1990

Career history

Coaching
- 1965-1966: Oakland City (freshman head coach)
- 1967–1972: Vincennes (assistant)
- 1972–1975: West Georgia (assistant)
- 1975–1984: Rockhurst
- 1984–1985: Pittsburg State
- 1985–1988: Sacramento Kings (assistant)
- 1986–1988: Sacramento Kings (interim HC)
- 1988–1990: Sacramento Kings

Jerry Owen Reynolds (born January 29, 1944) is an American former professional basketball coach and current executive in the NBA.

He coached the Sacramento Kings for two different stretches; once in 1987 and from 1988 through 1989. He also served as the team's general manager and was general manager of the WNBA’s Sacramento Monarchs, a post from which he retired in 2003.

Reynolds is from French Lick, Indiana, the same town as NBA legend Larry Bird.

In 2005, Jerry Reynolds wrote a book about his 20 years of experiences with the Kings called Reynolds Remembers Tales from the Sacramento Kings.

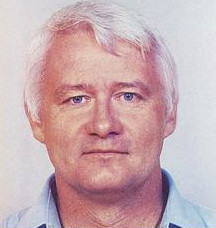
Reynolds, circa 1986

As of the 2016–17 NBA season, Reynolds is a broadcaster for the Kings, alongside Grant Napear, and its director of player personnel.

Prior to his NBA tenure, Reynolds enjoyed a successful coaching career in the college ranks as part of the staff at Vincennes University when the Trailblazers won the 1970 NJCAA National title. Later, he served on Roger Kaiser's staff at West Georgia College when the Braves won the 1974 NAIA Division I men's basketball tournament.

He began his coaching career as the Freshmen Head Coach during the 1965–66 season, while completing his undergraduate degree. He then returned to Vincennes as an assistant, before joining Roger Kaiser's staff at West Georgia. In 1975, he was named the head coach of the Rockhurst University Hawks; he joined the Kansas City Kings franchise in 1984.

Reynolds is a graduate of Vincennes University and Oakland City University. He was awarded an Honorary Doctorate in 1990 from Vincennes. He lives in Roseville, California with his wife Dodie whom he married in 1968.

He was inducted in the University of West Georgia Hall of Fame in 1991 and was selected for induction into the Indiana Basketball Hall of Fame in December, 2019. The ceremony was held in 2020.

== Head coaching record ==
Legend
Regular season	G	Games coached	W	Games won	L	Games lost	W–L %	Win–loss %
Playoffs	PG	Playoff games	PW	Playoff wins	PL	Playoff losses	PW–L %	Playoff win–loss %

Team	Year	G	W	L	W–L%	Finish	PG	PW	PL	PW–L%	Result
Sacramento	1986–87	36	15	21	.417	5th in Midwest	—	—	—	—	Missed Playoffs
Sacramento	1987–88	24	7	17	.292	6th in Midwest	—	—	—	—	Missed Playoffs
Sacramento	1988–89	82	27	55	.329	6th in Pacific	—	—	—	—	Missed Playoffs
Sacramento	1989–90	28	7	21	.250	7th in Pacific	—	—	—	—	Missed Playoffs
Career		170	56	114	.329		0	0	0	.0	
