= Springs Valley Community School Corporation =

School district in Indiana, United States

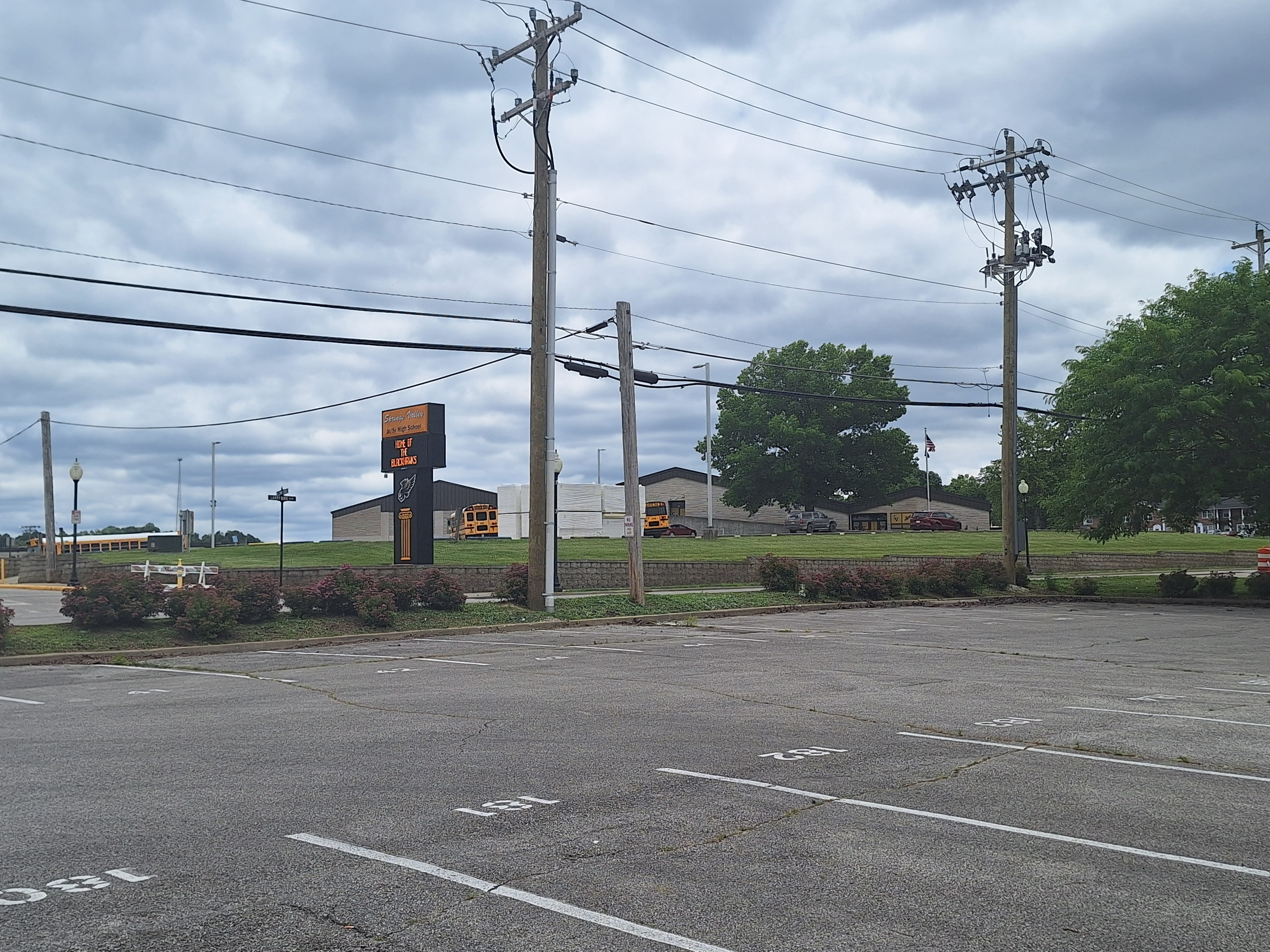
Springs Valley Junior-Senior High School

Springs Valley Community School Corporation is a school district headquartered in French Lick, Indiana. It operates two schools: Springs Valley Elementary School and Springs Valley Junior-Senior High School.

It covers French Lick Township, and includes French Lick and West Baden Springs.

== History ==
Circa 1938-1958 there had been discussions and proposals in the French Lick and West Baden Springs communities about forming a unified school district. In the summer of 1957 a special election put in place officials that were in favor of consolidating schools. Prior to that election, there was a group of people in French Lick who did not want consolidation and who had taken legal action to try to stop it.

The district was formed in 1957, and so the schools of French Lick and West Baden Springs consolidated. The anticipated number of high school students for the first school year was 375. Initially the district had properties in both cities, with elementary and junior high school students at West Baden and senior high school students in French Lick. In March 1958 the high school enrollment was 354.

Circa 1959, Marion Coplen, previously of the school district of Ohio Township-Rockport, became the superintendent of Springs Valley.

Tony Whitaker was superintendent until December 2018, when he retired. Trevor Apple became superintendent in January 2019.

By 2019, the Youth First organization made an agreement with the school district to send youth counselors to the schools.
