= Athletics at the 1995 Pan American Games – Men's high jump =

Men's high jump at the Pan American Games

The men's high jump event at the 1995 Pan American Games was held at the Estadio Atletico "Justo Roman" on 25 March.

== Results ==
Rank	Name	Nationality	2.00	2.05	2.10	2.15	2.20	2.23	2.26	2.29	2.32	2.36	2.40	2.46	Result	Notes
1st place, gold medalist(s)	Javier Sotomayor	Cuba	–	–	–	–	–	o	–	–	o	o	xo	xr	2.40	GR
2nd place, silver medalist(s)	Steve Smith	United States	–	–	–	o	o	o	–	o	xxx				2.29	
3rd place, bronze medalist(s)	Gilmar Mayo	Colombia	–	–	–	o	o	xxo	o	x–	xx				2.26	
4	Tony Barton	United States	–	–	–	o	o	o	–	xxx					2.23	
5	Cory Siermachesky	Canada	o	o	o	xo	xxx								2.15	
6	Charles Lefrançois	Canada	–	–	xo	xxo	xxx								2.15	
7	Fernando Moreno	Argentina	o	o	o	xxx									2.10	
8	Ricardo D'Andrilli	Argentina	xxo	xxx											2.00	
	Hugo Muñoz	Peru	–	–	xxx										NM	
	Troy Kemp	Bahamas													DNS	
