= Steve Smith (American high jumper) =

American former high jumper (born 1971)

Personal information
- Born: January 11, 1971 (age 55) Indianapolis, Indiana, United States

Sport
- Sport: Track and field
- Club: Indiana State Sycamores
Medal record
Representing United States
Pan American Games
Silver medal – second place	1995 Mar del Plata	High jump

Steve Smith (born January 11, 1971) is an American former high jumper.

At the 1999 Millrose Games he won gold; he won silver at the 1995 Pan American Games and placed second at the 1994 USA Outdoor Track and Field Championships. He also placed second at the 1995 and 1999 USA Indoor Track and Field Championships, and seventh at the 1995 IAAF World Indoor Championships.

He was educated at The Indiana State University, in Terre Haute, Indiana. A four-time NCAA All-American for Indiana State University in the men's high jump event, Smith finished 2nd in the NCAA Men's High Jump three times; He placed second at the 1994 NCAA Outdoor Championship and was named the MVP of the meet. He placed second at the 1991 and 1992 NCAA Indoor Championships, and fifth at the 1993 NCAA Outdoor Championships.

He still holds the Indiana State University high jump (indoor and outdoor) record(s) at 7’-4.5” (2.25 meters) - INDOOR and 7’-7” (2.31 meters) - OUTDOOR. A three-time All-Missouri Valley Conference Outdoor selection (1991, 1993, 1994), he won two outdoor MVC championships. Smith was ranked 3d in the United States in 1994 and 10th in the United States in 1993. In 1994, Indiana State awarded him the Hillman Outstanding Senior Athlete Award.

Smith is a student advisor at the University of Indianapolis.

== International competitions ==
Year	Competition	Venue	Position	Notes
1995	World Indoor Championships	Barcelona, Spain	7th	2.28 m
1995	Pan American Games	Mar del Plata, Argentina	2nd	2.29 m

== See also ==
- List of Indiana State University people
