= Palmyra Township, Knox County, Indiana =

Palmyra Township
- Township
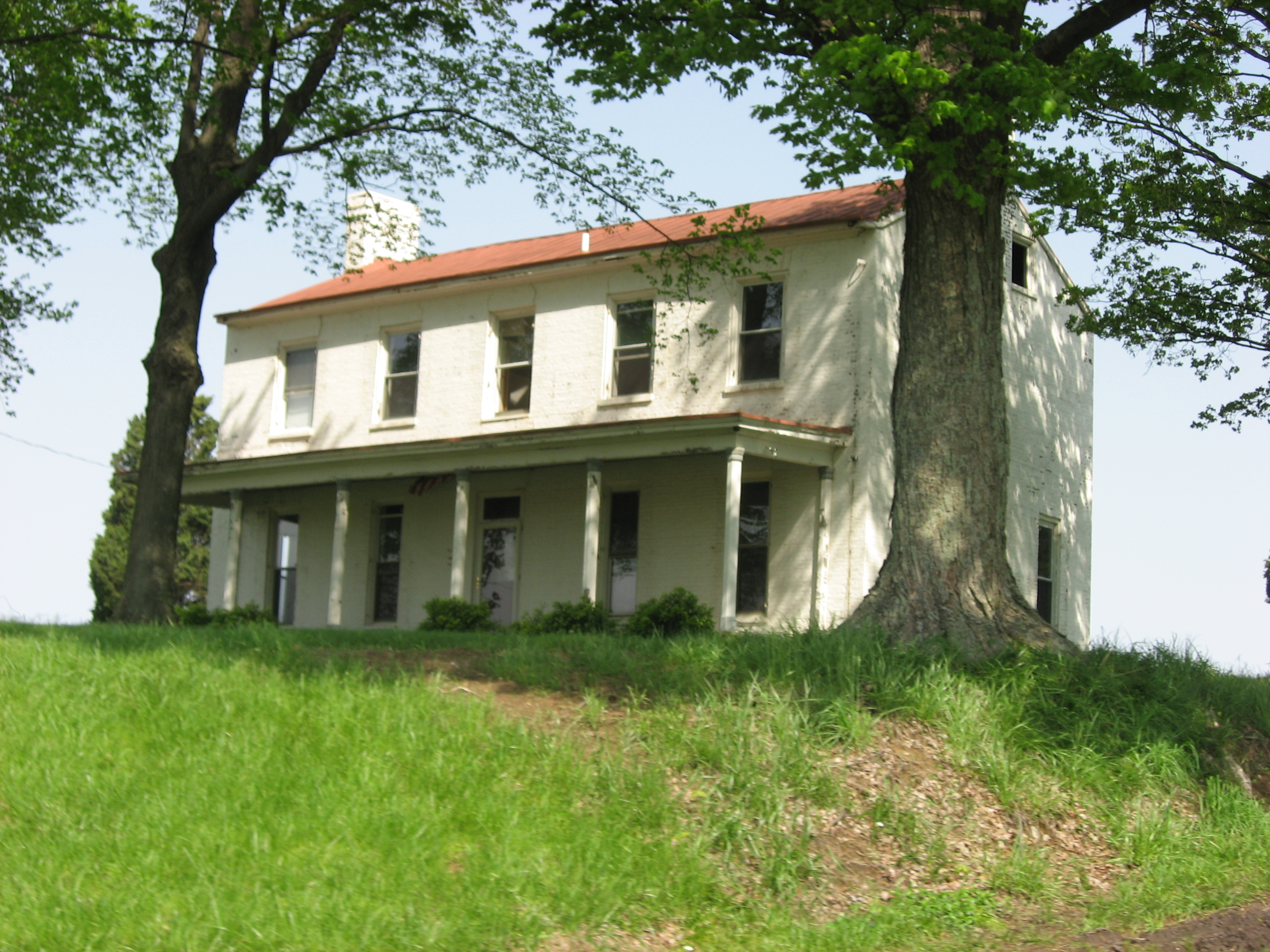
- Rose Hill Farmstead, a historic site in the township

- Coordinates: 38°40′49″N 87°24′34″W
- Country: United States
- State: Indiana
- County: Knox

Government
  - Type: Indiana township

Area
  - Total: 37.48 sq mi (97.1 km^{2})
  - Land: 37.47 sq mi (97.0 km^{2})
  - Water: 0.01 sq mi (0.026 km^{2})
- Elevation: 505 ft (154 m)

Population (2020)
  - Total: 1,512
  - Density: 40.35/sq mi (15.58/km^{2})
- FIPS code: 18-57744
- GNIS feature ID: 453704

Palmyra Township is one of ten townships in Knox County, Indiana. As of the 2020 census, its population was 1,512 (up from 1,466 at 2010) and it contained 632 housing units.

Historical population
Census	Pop.	Note	%±
1890	1,241		—
1900	1,364		9.9%
1910	1,201		−12.0%
1920	1,143		−4.8%
1930	1,102		−3.6%
1940	1,083		−1.7%
1950	1,136		4.9%
1960	1,204		6.0%
1970	1,188		−1.3%
1980	1,578		32.8%
1990	1,401		−11.2%
2000	1,593		13.7%
2010	1,466		−8.0%
2020	1,512		3.1%
Source: US Decennial Census

== History ==
Shadowwood was added to the National Register of Historic Places in 2001. Rose Hill Farmstead was formerly listed.

== Geography ==
According to the 2010 census, the township has a total area of 37.48 square miles (97.1 km^{2}), of which 37.47 square miles (97.0 km^{2}) (or 99.97%) is land and 0.01 square miles (0.026 km^{2}) (or 0.03%) is water.
