= Isaac K. Beckes =

Isaac Kelley Beckes (September 19, 1909 – July 13, 1988) was the president of Vincennes University from 1950 to 1980. Before going to Vincennes he was the executive secretary of the United Christian Youth Movement. He is considered one of the initial leaders of a nationwide educational movement to add occupational programs alongside college transfer programs at two-year post-secondary institutions. He was also the first president of a two-year college to gain an exemption from the North American Interfraternity Conference and have national fraternities established at his school.

== Early life ==
Beckes was born in Vincennes, Indiana to Arthur and Julia (Kelley) Beckes. His mother died when he was one year old. He completed his Associates degree at Vincennes University in 1933 and his Bachelor’s Degree from Indiana State Teachers College in 1935. In 1938 he received the Bachelor of Divinity from McCormick Theological Seminary and his Ph.D in 1943 from Yale University. He became an ordained Presbyterian minister.

On April 24, 1938, he married Ruth Laverne Alexander. They had two children, a son named Leland and a daughter named Kelley.

== United Christian Youth Movement ==
By 1944, Beckes was living in the Chicago, Illinois area and had become the director of the Young People’s Department of the International Council of Religious Education and the executive secretary of the United Christian Youth Movement. The movement represented forty different Protestant denominations with over ten million youths. He directed the nationwide programs of the member churches’ religious education activities in the United States and Canada.

In 1941 he wrote the book “Young Leaders In Action”. In 1946 he wrote the booklet “Weekday Religious Education : Help or Hindrance to Inter- Religious Understanding".

== Vincennes University ==
In 1950, Beckes returned to Vincennes to take over Vincennes University which was the only state supported junior college in Indiana. At the time, enrollment had dropped to 185 students and there was only one building in the downtown area. It was apparent that the university did not have the funding needed to match the needs of the returning World War II veterans. The budget that year $103,000.40.

Working with another VU alumnus and chairman of the college's Board of Trustees, Judge Curtis Shake, Beckes was able to make some rapid improvements with the university through a local capital funds drive. The city and the U.S. government donated Harrison Park to the school for use as a new campus and the new classroom and administration building was moved into in October 1953. The rest of the buildings were composed of the city water utilities’ old renovated pump house and some army surplus structures. Other nearby vacant industrial building were later bought and renovated causing Shake to comment that "the school had the best second-hand campus in the U.S."

In 1955 the Indiana Legislature agreed to provide two dollars of funding for every dollar that was raised by a Knox County tax that supported the university. The college and its two-year programs were approved and fully accredited by the North Central Association of Colleges and Schools in 1956, and the school grew rapidly thereafter. This allowed the school to build a new student union building in 1959 and a new library in 1960.

In 1957 he signed a trial (one year) transfer agreement with Frederick L. Hovde of Purdue University. The agreement allowed students at VU who completed as associate degree in Agriculture to transfer to Purdue to complete their bachelor's degree. VU students are treated the same as Purdue students who are entering their junior year. The agreement has been offered continuously since it was first signed.

When Colonel Eugene C. Wharf died his widow, Mrs. Stella C. Wharf, conveyed the family home, Shadowwood, to the university as a memorial. At the suggestion of Judge Shake, Beckes worked to transfer the property to the Grand Chapter of the Sigma Pi fraternity for use as its national headquarters in August 1961. The fraternity had been founded at the university in 1897. Mrs. Wharf heartily approved of the deal.

In 1964 Beckes appointed Fred Walker to create a journalism program for the college. VU also established its own cable television outlet.

With the growth and accreditation of the school, Beckes looked for other ways to enhance the university. Working with Sigma Pi, he was able to get an exemption from the North American Interfraternity Conference (NIC) in 1964. The NIC had forbidden fraternity chapters at junior colleges. He helped form an interest group known as the Corinthian Club that eventually became a colony of the fraternity. When the Alpha chapter’s charter was granted in 1965, he was initiated into the organization with the undergraduate members and their faculty advisor.

In the late 1960s and early 1970s, Beckes served as a director for the National League for Nursing. He was affiliated with the group into the early 1980s.

As the school grew, it began getting line-item funding in the Indiana state budget in 1965. It also grew more complex and Dr. Beckes, along with VU Director of Administrative Services Robert Stryzinski, worked with the legislature to revamp the school’s Board of trustees from twenty-four members to a more manageable number in 1976. That year the school’s budget was over $5 million.

== Retirement ==
When Beckes resigned as president in 1980, the school had grown to 4,600 students with a campus of 85 acres and fifty buildings. After retirement he continued to improve the university as head of the VU Alumni Foundation and as a member of the Vincennes Area Community Development Corporation. He died at Good Samaritan Hospital in Vincennes in 1988.

== Honors ==
In 1957, VU built a new student union which was named for him. It contained a student lounge, cafeteria, bookstore, and meeting rooms.
In 1964, Beckes was given the Indiana State University Distinguished Alumni Award.
On May 17, 1980, he received an Honorary LL.D Degree from Indiana State University - Muncee.
In the summer of 1980 he received Sigma Pi Fraternity’s Founders’ Award.
In 1981, he was given the Walter A. Davis Citation by the Vincennes University Alumni Association.
In 1992, VU built a new student union which was named for him. The original student union was renamed Governors Hall.
The Knox County Development Corporation named their industrial park in his honor.
