= Jerry Blemker =

Coach

Jerald William "Jerry" Blemker (October 2, 1944 – May 30, 2012) is a former coach of the Vincennes University baseball team. He finished his career with the most career wins (1,178) in NJCAA baseball. 180+ of his players continued their college careers elsewhere; 27 players went on to the professional ranks. Brad Pennington and Darek Braunecker are the most noteworthy; Pennington spent 6 seasons in the major leagues, while Braunecker achieved fame as a top agent for players such as Cliff Lee and A. J. Burnett; His son Zachary plays shortstop for Southeast Missouri State.
