= Luqman Jimoh =

Nigerian academic administrator

Lukman Jimoh

Vice-Chancellor of Kwara State University
- Incumbent
- Assumed office 5 January 2023
- Preceded by: Mustapha Akanbi

Personal details
- Born: Shaykh Luqman Jimoh
- Education: University of Ilorin; University of Ibadan; Lagos State University
- Profession: Academic; Educator; Administrator

Shaykh-Luqman Alade Jimoh is a Nigerian professor of Islamic medicine and theology who became the acting vice chancellor of Kwara State University, Malete, Kwara State, Nigeria, since 5 January 2023 following the death of former vice chancellor, Professor Mustapha Akanbi. He was the deputy vice-chancellor (academics) until his appointment as the vice-chancellor.

== Education and career ==
Jimoh had his first degree in Arabic from the University of Ilorin in the year 1988 and then obtained his master's degree in Arabic and Islamic studies from the University of Ibadan in 1995 while his Ph.D. was in Islamic studies from the Lagos State University 2007.

He was first a lecturer at the Department of Religion and Islamic Contemporary Studies of the Lagos State University, Nigeria, where he lectured for 16 years between 1996 and 2012. He joined Kwara State University as a member of the Faculty of Religion, History and Heritage Studies in 2012 and has since risen in rank to the position of the school's current vice chancellor.
