= Springs Valley High School =

Public high school in Indiana, United States

Springs Valley Junior-Senior High School
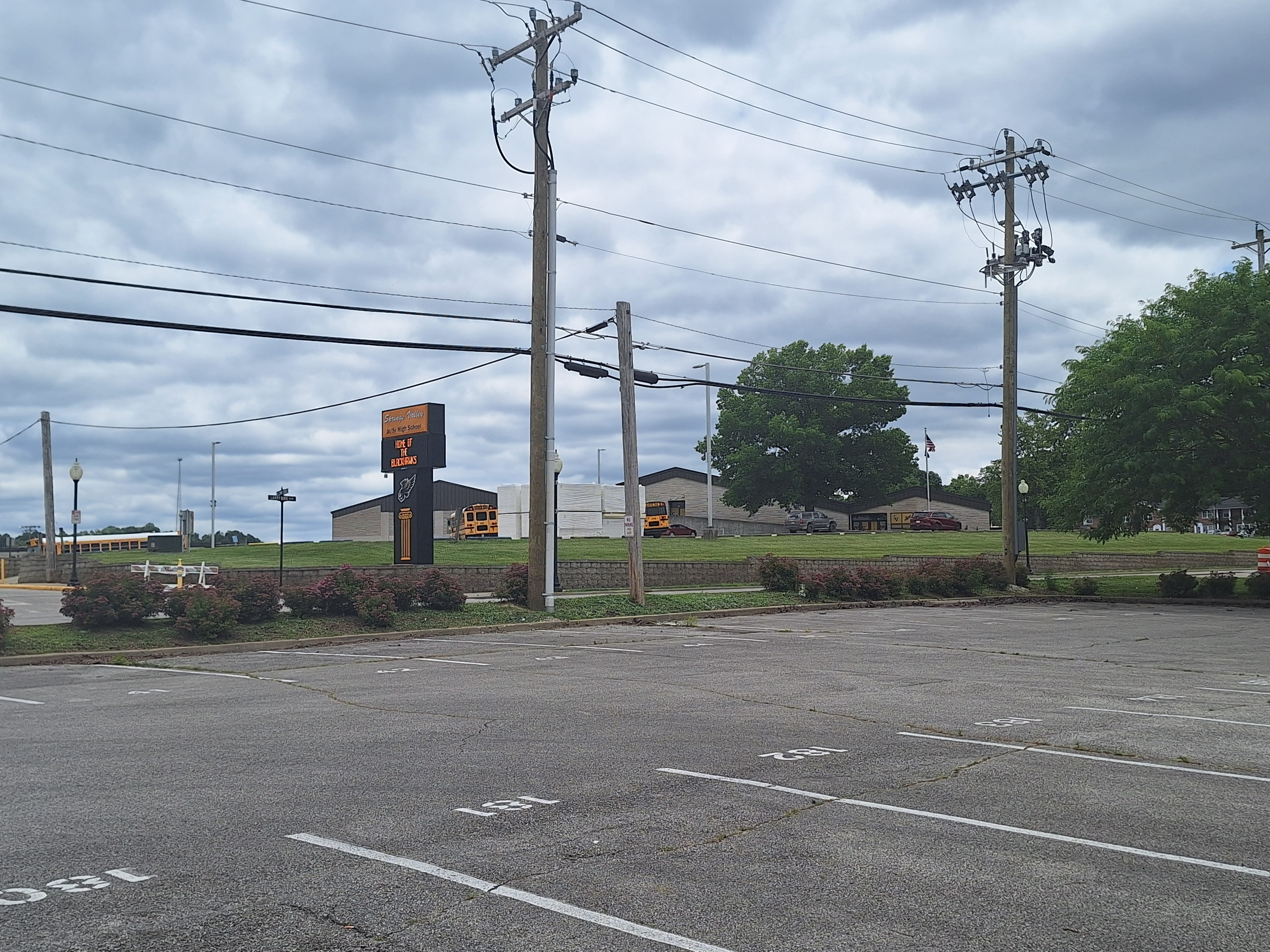

Location
- 326 South Larry Bird Boulevard; French Lick, Indiana 47432; United States
- 38.549648°N 86.616082°W

Information
- Type: Public high school
- Established: 1958
- School district: Springs Valley Community School Corporation
- Principal: Kyle Neukam
- Faculty: 28.50 (FTE)
- Grades: 6–12
- Enrollment: 452 (2023-24)
- Student to teacher ratio: 15.86
- Color
- Athletics: IHSAA Class A
- Athletics conference: Patoka Lake Conference
- Nickname: Blackhawks
- Website: Official Website Sports Website

Springs Valley Junior-Senior High School is a public high school located in French Lick, Indiana. The school is part of the Springs Valley Community School Corporation.

== About ==
The school opened in 1957 after the consolidation of French Lick and West Baden High Schools.

== Athletics and extracurriculars ==
Springs Valley Junior-Senior High School's athletic teams are nicknamed the "Blackhawks". In the Blackhawks' first season of 1957–58 in basketball, they advanced to the final four of the Indiana state tournament losing to the eventual state champion, Fort Wayne South Side, 55–42.

=== Blackhawk Brigade ===
The Junior High/High School band the "Blackhawk Brigade" was directed by Gilbert Aylsworth. His son John Aylsworth took over as director upon the Senior Aylsworth's retirement. After the 1994 season, John retired and during the next seven years, the band had three different directors. In 2001, Luke Aylsworth, John's son, took over as director for the band. The Blackhawk Brigade won the Class C state championship in 1977, the class D state championship in 2010, 2016, and 2017. The Brigade was State Champion Runner-Up in 1978, 1992, 2007, 2012, 2013, 2014 and 2015. In 2016 they had their first undefeated season in the history of the program. They have been to the state finals more than twenty times. The Brigade moved to Class D in 1981.

== Notable alumni ==
- Larry Bird - Hall of fame forward, former NBA player for the Boston Celtics, former coach and executive of the Indiana Pacers. Bird started for the boys basketball team, where he left as the school's all-time scoring leader.

== See also ==
- List of high schools in Indiana
- Patoka Lake Conference
- French Lick, Indiana
