= P. Pete Chalos =

Panagiotis Chalos (June 25, 1927 – June 4, 2006) sometimes known as Pete Panagiotis Chalos or P. Pete Chalos was the second-longest-serving mayor in the history of Terre Haute, Indiana, serving from 1980 to 1996. Chalos' four consecutive terms as mayor place him behind only Ralph Tucker, who served from 1948 to 1968.

== Biography ==
Chalos, the son of a Greek immigrant who operated a downtown Terre Haute hat shop and shoeshine parlor that employed future entertainer Scatman Crothers, ran track and cross country at Wiley High School in Terre Haute and later became a teacher and a successful coach in the Vigo County and Clay County public schools. An opponent of Indiana's 1959 law requiring school consolidation, Chalos stated that he favored small community schools. His view of the community school as a gathering place and source of identity for a town was (and is) shared by more than a few older Hoosiers who still bemoan their loss more than 45 years after the law was passed.

Chalos was elected to the Terre Haute City Council in 1971, serving eight years, and then won election as Terre Haute's mayor in 1979, serving in that office from 1980 to 1996. During his years in city politics, Terre Haute slowly shed its image as a Midwestern "Sin City" that had existed for many years since it once was home to a thriving "red light district" and, for a short time (between September and November 1957), an international gambling syndicate.

Chalos sought a fifth term as mayor in 1995, but was defeated by then-Vigo County Sheriff James Jenkins, who went on to win the general election that fall.

After leaving office, Chalos remained committed to the community. He took part in the ceremonial opening of Terre Haute's extended First Street corridor, a project which was initially proposed during his years as mayor, in June 2005. In addition, he published four books: "Growing Up in Terre Haute," about his childhood; "Just a Thought"; "Mayor"; and "Speak Out". Chalos also authored a column which was published regularly in the Terre Haute Tribune-Star newspaper.

Chalos died of natural causes on June 4, 2006.
