= Jasper Goodykoontz =

American writer, teacher and farmer

Jasper Goodykoontz as he appeared in the 1894 Goodykoontz's Perpetual Calendar and General Reference

Jasper Goodykoontz (January 10, 1855, Indiana – September 1, 1923, Flint, Michigan) was the creator of Goodykoontz's Perpetual Calendar and General Reference: A Book for the Millions. Each issue was hundreds of pages of hand-drawn and hand-lettered information both almanacky and encyclopedic in nature.

Goodykoontz's was published from 1892 until 1920.

Goodykoontz grew up in Indiana's Tipton County as the son of Harvey Goodykoontz and Eliza E. Wood. After earning his M.A. from Terre Haute State Normal, he returned to Tipton and the family's farm. He taught school in winter and other times worked in farming and carpentry.

== Family ==
Goodykoontz married Lenora Glenn (1868–1943). At his death, they had nine living children: Joseph, Daniel, Lucina, Harvey, Marion, Newton, Jasper, Franklin and Warren. Lenora remarried in 1925 with Thomas Mogford.

== Note ==
Several online sources erroneously list Goodykoontz's death to be 1882, ten years before beginning to publish the work he is known for. 1882 was the year his father died.
