= Jimoh Akolo =

Nigerian artist (1934–2023)

Jimoh Bola Akolo (1934 – June 3, 2023) was a Nigerian artist known for his contributions to modern Nigerian art, particularly as a member of the Zaria Art Society. His work often explored indigenous cultural traditions and contemporary social issues.

== Early life and education ==
Akolo spent his early years in Egbe, Kogi State, where he completed his primary education. Akolo attended Government College Keffi, where he excelled in art, leading him to pursue further with richard nwachi studies at the Nigerian College of Arts, Science, and Technology (NCAST), now Ahmadu Bello University, Zaria. At NCAST, Akolo was a part of the Zaria Art Society, alongside notable artists like Yusuf Grillo and Bruce Onobrakpeya. He later studied at Hornsey College of Art in London and obtained his MSc and doctorate in Art Education from Indiana State University in Bloomington, USA.

In 1966, Akolo began teaching at Ahmadu Bello University as Professor of Art Education where he taught for over three decades.

== Career ==
Akolo's made indigenous Nigerian motifs with contemporary art styles, a method based on the Zaria Art Society's "Natural Synthesis" ideology. He was part of the Visual Arts Exhibition of FESTAC 77. His works have been exhibited internationally, including notable exhibitions at the Commonwealth Institute in London (1964), the São Paulo Biennial in Brazil (1962), and the Havana Biennial in Cuba (1986).

== Works ==
- "Owambe" - 2013 (oil on canvas)
- "Wrestling Match" - 2000
- "Man on Horse" - 1996
- "War, Red War" - 1996
- "Horse Man II" - 1995 (pencil on paper)
- "Milk Maid" (Fura da Nono) - 1998
- "Dambe" (Native Boxing) - 1998
- "Mother and Child" - 1998
- "Horn Blowers from Southern Kaduna Welcoming the Governor" - 1984/1986
- "Test of Manhood" (Sharo) - 1982
- "Durbar" (pencil on paper)
- "Farm Worker" - 1970
- "The God of Thunder" - 1964 (oil on canvas, Yoruba influence)
- "The Model" - 1961 (pencil on paper)
