= Vincennes University =

Public university in Vincennes, Indiana, US

- Former names: Jefferson Academy (1801–1806)
- Motto: S'Instruire pour servir
- Motto in English: Learn in order to serve
- Type: Public baccalaureate college
- Established: 1801; 225 years ago
- Founder: William Henry Harrison
- Accreditation: Higher Learning Commission
- President: Charles R. "Chuck" Johnson
- Faculty: 722 (fall 2023)
- Students: 18,438 (fall 2023) (Note: System-wide, including 3,739 degree-seeking and 14,699 non-degree-seeking students.)
- Location: Vincennes, Indiana, United States; 38°41′18″N 87°31′12″W
- Campus: Remote town
- Colors: Blue and Gold
- Nickname: Trailblazers
- Sporting affiliations: NJCAA Division II; Mid-West Athletic Conference
- Website: vinu.edu
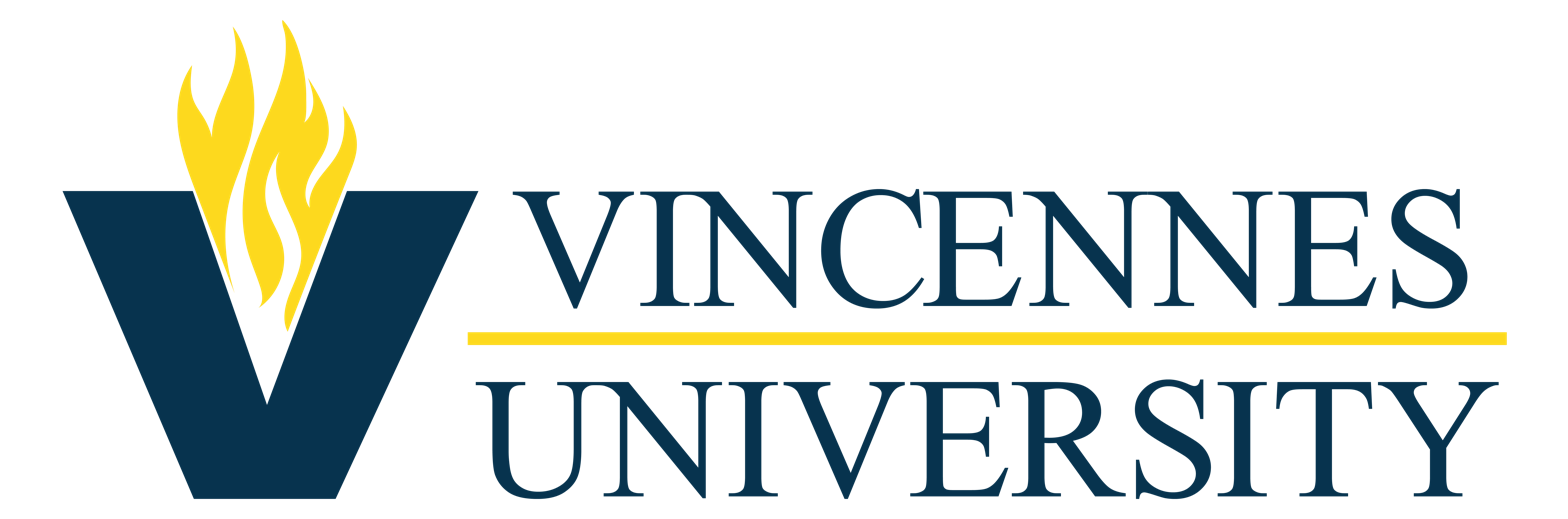

Vincennes University (VU) is a public college with its main campus in Vincennes, Indiana, United States. Founded in 1801 as Jefferson Academy, VU is the oldest public institution of higher learning in Indiana. It was chartered in 1806 as the Indiana Territory's four-year university and remained the state of Indiana's sole public university until the establishment of Indiana University in 1820. VU was rechartered as a two-year university in 1889 and began offering bachelor's degrees in 2005.

Vincennes University's campus is a residential campus on the banks of the Wabash River. Other VU sites include a campus in Jasper, Indiana, the Center for Advanced Manufacturing and Logistics in Fort Branch, Indiana, along with centers for Aviation, Logistics, Advanced Manufacturing, and American Sign Language, in the Indianapolis area.

== History ==
Vincennes University is one of the oldest universities north of the Ohio River and west of the Allegheny Mountains. The institution was founded in 1801 as Jefferson Academy and incorporated by the Indiana Territory legislature as Vincennes University on November 29, 1806. Founded by territorial governor and future U.S. president William Henry Harrison, VU is one of three colleges founded by U.S. presidents, along with the University at Buffalo and the University of Virginia. For over two hundred years, VU was the only two-year university in Indiana, although baccalaureate degrees in select areas were available before 1889.

Vincennes University, also known colloquially as Territorial University during the early 19th century, was the only public university established by the Indiana Territory prior to the formation of the states of Indiana and Illinois. The town of Vincennes was chosen as the location of both the capital of the Indiana Territory and of the university because it was centrally located at the approximate population-density center of the Indiana Territory. Father Jean Francois Rivet, former professor of Latin at the Royal College of Limoges, France, was the first headmaster of Jefferson Academy, with classes taking place in the main room of the church rectory. The university held its first classes in 1811 and taught courses in English, Latin, Greek, geography, and mathematics. It closed in 1818 while the university board attempted to raise funding after Indiana achieved statehood.

The new Indiana General Assembly established Indiana University in 1820. Its chartering started a legal and political battle was between Indiana University and Vincennes University as to which was the legitimate state university, culminating in the 1853 U.S. Supreme Court case Trustees for Vincennes University v. Indiana. The legal dispute arose in part because a portion of VU's status as a land-grant public university derived from the fact that VU is the inheritor of the land-grant and facilities of Territorial University.

The General Assembly converted the university into the temporary Knox County Seminary in 1824 to allow it to raise funding. It was reopened as a university in 1838. To clarify the mission of VU vis a vis Indiana's other institutions of higher education at the time (Purdue University, the State Normal School, and Indiana University), the state of Indiana rechartered VU in 1889 as a two-year university.

In 1897, a small literary society called Tau Phi Delta was started at VU, which soon after became the founding ("Alpha") chapter of Sigma Pi fraternity, making that organization the first of its kind to be founded west of the Ohio Valley. A clock tower on the VU campus commemorates the event.

In 1999, Indiana Governor Frank O'Bannon and Stan Jones, commissioner for higher education, persuaded the Indiana state legislature to mandate a "coordinated partnership" between Vincennes University and Ivy Tech State College. The arrangement was dissolved by the 2005 rechartering of Ivy Tech State College as a statewide system of comprehensive community colleges.

== Academics ==
Vincennes University offers a diverse set of majors that are focused on careers in teaching and industry. Vincennes University has a 35% graduation rate.

Vincennes University is organized into six colleges:

- Business and Public Service (includes Homeland Security and Law Enforcement)
- Health Sciences and Human Performance
- Humanities
- Science, Engineering, and Mathematics
- Social Science, Performing Arts, and Communications
- Technology

== Buildings ==
Buildings and facilities on the campuses of Vincennes University include:

=== Main campus ===
- Updike Hall of Science Engineering and Mathematics
- Jefferson Student Union (replaced Beckes Student Union in 2017).
- Construction Technology Building
- Shircliff Humanities Building
- Davis Hall (Public Service/Broadcasting)
- Homeland Security Building
- Governors Hall (Admissions) (Original Beckes Student Union, until 1992).
- Welsh Administration Building
- Beckes Student Union (built in 1992, it was the student union until 2017).
- Wathen Business Building
- Donald G. Bell Student Recreation Center
- PE Complex
- Police Department
- Phillip M. Summers Social Science Building
- Robert C. Beless Gym
- Robert E. Green Activities Center
- Dayson Alumni Center
- Della Young Building – Statewide Services
- Center for Health Sciences
- Tecumseh Dining Center
- Red Skelton Performing Arts Center / Red Skelton Museum
- Shake Learning Resource Center
- Automotive Technology Building
- Residence Halls
  - Clark Hall
  - Ebner Hall (College of Technology Learning Community)
  - Godare Hall
  - Morris Hall
  - Vanderburgh Hall
  - Vigo Hall
- Outlying Main Facilities
  - Indiana
    - John Deere Agriculture Tech Building (Immediately north of Vincennes on U.S. 41)
  - Illinois
    - O'Neal Airfield in Westport, Illinois
    - Mid America International Airport in Lawrenceville, Illinois
- State historic buildings
  - Jefferson Academy building

=== Jasper ===
- Ruxer Student Center
- Habig Technology Center
- Administrative Classroom Building
- New Classroom Building
- Center for Technology Innovation and Manufacturing (CTIM) Building

=== Indianapolis area ===
- Aviation Technology Center houses the Aviation Maintenance program and ground classes for the Aviation Flight Program on the grounds of the Indianapolis International Airport.
- Vincennes University Aviation located on the grounds of Eagle Creek Airpark is the base airport for all active Vincennes University aircraft. The fleet consists of 8 Cirrus SR20 aircraft and 2 Piper PA-44 Seminole aircraft.
- American Sign Language program at the Indiana School for the Deaf.
- Logistics Training and Education Center is in Plainfield, Indiana.
- Gene Haas Training and Education Center is in Lebanon, Indiana.

=== Fort Branch / Gibson County ===
- Center for Advanced Manufacturing, in cooperation with North American Crane Certifications (NACC), became an official training and testing site for Crane Institute Certification (CIC) in February 2016.

== Athletics ==
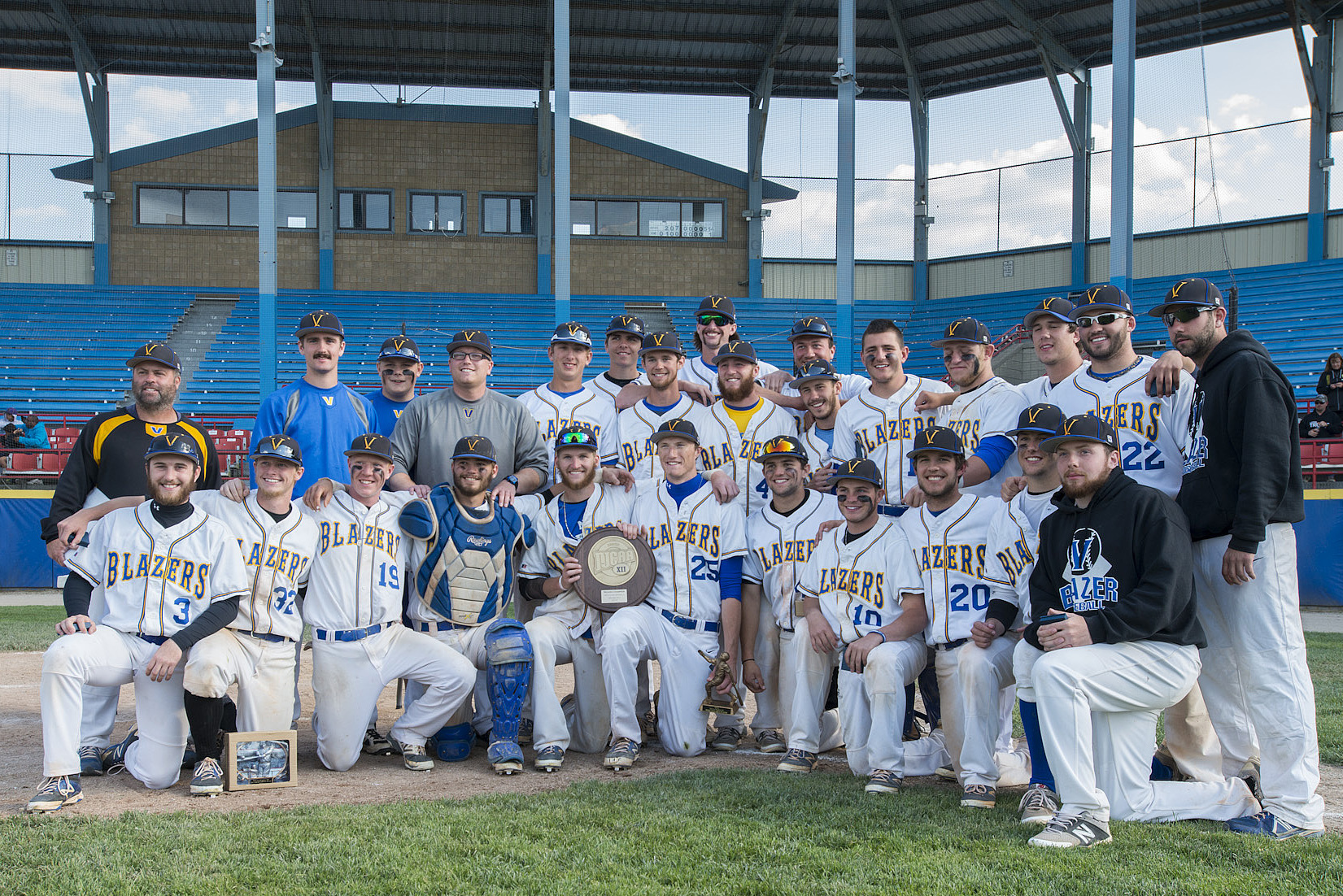
The Vincennes Trailblazers baseball team in 2014

VU is a member of the National Junior College Athletic Association (NJCAA). In honor of its local heritage, the VU team moniker is the Trailblazers. Trailblazers refers to the early years of Vincennes as a French fur-trading post and American outpost in the frontier of the Northwest Territory and its later period as capital of the Indiana Territory. When the Trailblazers moniker needs to be personified by a mascot, VU depicts a Trailblazer as minute man or woodsman-type frontier settler, inspired by such as George Rogers Clark who resided in Indiana after his military career.

The VU Trailblazers compete in baseball, bowling, golf, basketball, cross country, volleyball, and track and field. Its bowling team is particularly well known as it has won 21 NJCAA national championships. The men's bowling team won the 1983 USBC collegiate national championship. The men's basketball team is a national NJCAA power, winning national titles in 1965, 1970, 1972 and 2019; they were national finalists in 1986. The men's cross-country team won NJCAA titles in 1969 and 1971; they have 12 additional "Top Ten" finishes in the NJCAA National Finals.

== Broadcasting facilities ==
The university operates television station WVUT, a PBS affiliate, on channel 22. It also operates full-power radio stations WVUB at 91.1 MHz —WFML at 96.7 MHz.

== Notable faculty and staff ==
- Jerry Blemker, baseball coach

== Notable alumni ==
- Isaac K. Beckes – president of Vincennes University from 1950 to 1980
- DJ Brewton (born 2000) – basketball player in the Israeli Basketball Premier League
- James C. Denny – Indiana Attorney General from 1872 to 1874
- Max Mapes Ellis, physiologist and explorer.
- William Gainey – first Senior Enlisted Advisor to the Chairman (SEAC) of the Joint Chiefs of Staff
- David Goodnow – CNN news anchor, retired
- Chuck Goodrich – member of the Indiana House of Representatives
- Rickey Green – former NBA player; NBA All-Star, NCAA All-American
- Willie Humes – Idaho State; All-American basketball player; Indiana Basketball Hall of Fame inductee (2016)
- Mario Joyner – stand-up comedian and actor
- Carl Landry – former NBA player
- Newton Lee – computer scientist, author, futurist, and chairman of the California Transhumanist Party.
- Princess Lindiwe – Swazi royal and politician
- Shawn Marion – former NBA player; NBA Champion, NBA All-Star
- Bob McAdoo – former NBA player, Naismith Memorial Basketball Hall of Fame inductee; 1982 NBA Champion, 1985 NBA Champion, 1975 NBA MVP, five-time NBA All-Star
- John Mellencamp – musician
- Mychal Mulder – NBA player
- Brad Pennington – MLB player
- Jerry Reynolds – former NBA coach, General Manager; current broadcaster for Sacramento Kings
- Curtis G. Shake – jurist, politician, 72nd Justice of the Indiana Supreme Court, State Senator, and one of the Judges of the United States Nuremberg Military Tribunals
- Maurice Cole Tanquary – entomologist and explorer
- Eric Williams – former NBA player
- Clarence "Foots" Walker – former NBA player; NJCAA National Champion, NAIA National Champion
