= Harrison Township, Harrison County, Indiana =

Harrison Township
- Township
- Location in Harrison County
- Coordinates: 38°11′02″N 86°10′33″W
- Country: United States
- State: Indiana
- County: Harrison
- Named for: William Henry Harrison

Government
  - Type: Indiana township

Area
  - Total: 101.58 sq mi (263.1 km^{2})
  - Land: 101.33 sq mi (262.4 km^{2})
  - Water: 0.25 sq mi (0.65 km^{2}) 0.25%
- Elevation: 699 ft (213 m)

Population (2020)
  - Total: 13,469
  - Density: 132.92/sq mi (51.322/km^{2})
- GNIS feature ID: 0453387

Harrison Township is one of twelve townships in Harrison County, Indiana, United States. As of the 2010 census, its population was 13,469 and it contained 5,603 housing units. Corydon, the county seat of Harrison County, is in Harrison Township.

Historical population
Census	Pop.	Note	%±
1890	3,537		—
1900	4,288		21.2%
1910	4,231		−1.3%
1920	4,141		−2.1%
1930	4,429		7.0%
1940	4,786		8.1%
1950	5,400		12.8%
1960	5,892		9.1%
1970	6,241		5.9%
1980	7,727		23.8%
1990	8,239		6.6%
2000	10,303		25.1%
2010	12,484		21.2%
2020	13,469		7.9%
Source: US Decennial Census

== History ==
The township, like the county, is named for governor, general and ninth President William Henry Harrison. The majority of land in the township was in his possession in the first decade of the 19th century. He donated a parcel of land for the construction of Corydon and sold much of the rest of his land in the township by 1815 to the settlers who were rapidly occupying the countryside.

Corydon Battle Site was added to the National Register of Historic Places in 1979.

== Geography ==
According to the 2010 census, the township has a total area of 101.58 square miles (263.1 km^{2}), of which 101.33 square miles (262.4 km^{2}) (or 99.75%) is land and 0.25 square miles (0.65 km^{2}) (or 0.25%) is water. The streams of Blue River, Brush Heap Creek, Buck Creek, Hickman Branch, Little Indian Creek, Potato Run and Rock Creek run through this township.

=== Cities and towns ===
- Corydon (the county seat)

=== Unincorporated towns ===
- Harrison Grange
- Hillcrest
- Idlewild (historical)
- Kings Store
- White Cloud

(This list is based on USGS data and may include former settlements.)

=== Adjacent townships ===
- Jackson Township (northeast)
- Franklin Township (east)
- Boone Township (southeast)
- Webster Township (southeast)
- Heth Township (south)
- Washington Township (southwest)
- Jennings Township, Crawford County (west)
- Ohio Township, Crawford County (west)
- Spencer Township (northwest)

=== Major highways ===
- Interstate 64
- Indiana State Road 62
- Indiana State Road 135
- Indiana State Road 337
