= Blue River Township, Harrison County, Indiana =

Blue River Township
- Township
- Location in Harrison County
- Coordinates: 38°22′40″N 86°12′50″W
- Country: United States
- State: Indiana
- County: Harrison

Government
  - Type: Indiana township

Area
  - Total: 38.65 sq mi (100.1 km^{2})
  - Land: 38.44 sq mi (99.6 km^{2})
  - Water: 0.22 sq mi (0.57 km^{2}) 0.57%
- Elevation: 748 ft (228 m)

Population (2020)
  - Total: 2,016
  - Density: 52.45/sq mi (20.25/km^{2})
- GNIS feature ID: 0453118

Blue River Township is one of twelve townships in Harrison County, Indiana, United States. As of the 2020 census, its population was 2,016 and it contained 866 housing units.

Historical population
Census	Pop.	Note	%±
1890	1,196		—
1900	1,268		6.0%
1910	1,367		7.8%
1920	1,163		−14.9%
1930	1,057		−9.1%
1940	1,042		−1.4%
1950	1,078		3.5%
1960	1,128		4.6%
1970	1,218		8.0%
1980	1,471		20.8%
1990	1,867		26.9%
2000	1,923		3.0%
2010	2,064		7.3%
2020	2,016		−2.3%
Source: US Decennial Census

== Geography ==
According to the 2010 census, the township has a total area of 38.65 square miles (100.1 km^{2}), of which 38.44 square miles (99.6 km^{2}) (or 99.46%) is land and 0.22 square miles (0.57 km^{2}) (or 0.57%) is water. The stream of Baldy Creek runs through this township.

=== Cities and towns ===
- Milltown (east half)

=== Unincorporated towns ===
- Depauw
- Lowdell

(This list is based on USGS data and may include former settlements.)

=== Adjacent townships ===
- Posey Township, Washington County (north)
- Morgan Township (east)
- Jackson Township (southeast)
- Spencer Township (south)
- Whiskey Run Township, Crawford County (west)

=== Cemeteries ===
The township contains four major cemeteries: Boston, Breedlove, Mount Zion and Reno.

=== Major highways ===
- U.S. Route 150
- Indiana State Road 64
- Indiana State Road 337
