= Harrison Spring =

Largest natural spring in Indiana, U.S.

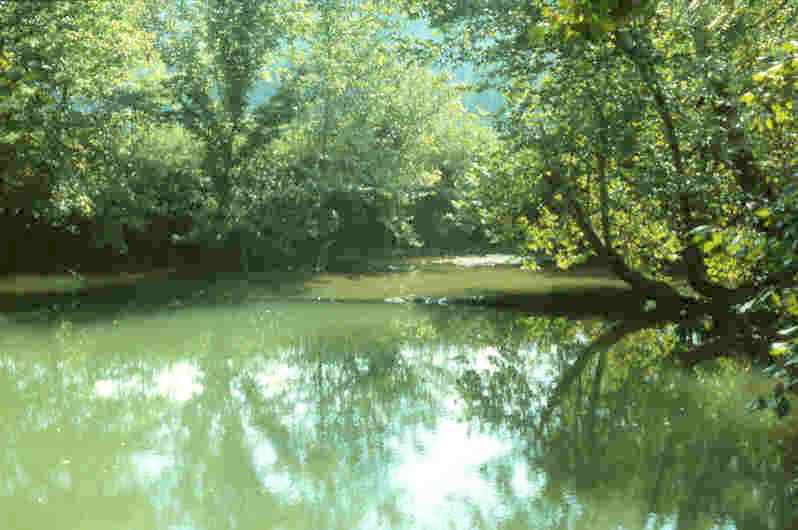
- Harrison Spring

- Location within Indiana
- Type: waterbody
- Location: Harrison County, Indiana
- Nearest city: White Cloud
- Coordinates: 38°14′39″N 86°13′30″W
- Area: 7 acres (2.8 ha)

U.S. National Natural Landmark
- Designated: 1980

Harrison Spring is the largest spring in the U.S. state of Indiana. It is located in west-central Harrison County, near the Blue River and just north of White Cloud.

== Physical characteristics ==
Several dye trace studies have shown that the drainage basin of Harrison Spring is, by Indiana standards, very large. Indian Creek is a major infeeder to the Harrison Springs drainage system as the entire summer flow of Indian Creek can disappear at the Sinks of Indian Creek and re-emerge at Harrison Springs in low-flow conditions, in about one hour. Given that Big Indian Creek – upstream of the Sinks of Indian Creek – drains an area between Corydon and Georgetown, and that Little Indian Creek (an infeeder to Big Indian) drains an area that runs east of Lanesville, the Indian Creek portion of the Harrison Spring drainage basin alone drains an area of at least 200 square miles (520 km^{2}).

The other major known drainage basin is nearly entirely subsurface karst drainage and includes a known area that runs from Harrison Spring to the north and northeast to Ramsey and Central Barren, just 2–3 miles (3.2–4.8 km) south of Palmyra and contains an area of at least 39 square miles (100 km^{2}).

While mapping parts of Binkley's Cave, the largest known cave in Indiana, the cavers of the Indiana Speleological Survey (ISS) have noted that according to their cave mapping data, water in the Blowing Hole section of Binkley's appears to flow under the bed of Indian Creek, near the Sinks of Indian Creek, and resurge at Harrison Spring. This is further proven by dye trace studies performed in the sinkhole plain containing Binkley's Cave.

Surface water that sinks into the sinkhole plain in areas near the intersection of Shiloh Road and Indiana State Road 135 south of Corydon has been observed to flow through known parts of Binkley's Cave, subterraneally under Indian Creek, exit to the surface at Harrison Spring, and flow to the Blue River. There may be a link under Indian Creek between Harrison Spring and Binkley's Cave. However the route would certainly involve many long cave dives – nothing of which on such a scale has ever been attempted in Indiana. Such a connection would likely greatly expand the known lengths of both caves as there are still significant gaps of unexplored cave in between the two systems. Binkley's currently measures around 44 miles (71 km) in length – the longest known cave in Indiana and the seventh longest cave known in the United States – and its known extent is increasing due to the efforts of the ISS. Cave divers led by Dave Strickland have mapped several thousand feet of cave in Harrison Spring – all of which was at a significant depth, and entirely underwater.

The rise pool at Harrison Spring measures approximately 120 feet (37 m) by 95 feet (29 m). It is within an abandoned meander loop of Blue River. Divers have measured its depth to be about 45 feet (14 m). Harrison Spring has an average discharge of 100 cubic feet per second (2.8 m^{3}/s) with a flood discharge of up to 900 cubic feet per second (25 m^{3}/s). The water from the spring overflows into an outlet that travels about 3/4 mile (1.2 km) before merging with Blue River as a tributary.

== History ==
The spring is privately owned. It was once part of a large 600-acre (2.4 km^{2}) farm owned by United States President William Henry Harrison, from whom it gains its name. The spring produced enough water to run a gristmill and sawmill downstream which began operating 1807, making it one of the first in the state. The farm was known as Harrison Valley. Harrison had planned to make it a plantation similar to Grouseland, and a shipyard. However, the outlawing of slavery by the Indiana Constitution of 1816 made this impossible.

The spring was registered as a National Natural Landmark in 1980, but is not open to the public.
