= Glidas, Indiana =

Unincorporated community in Indiana, United States

- Unincorporated community
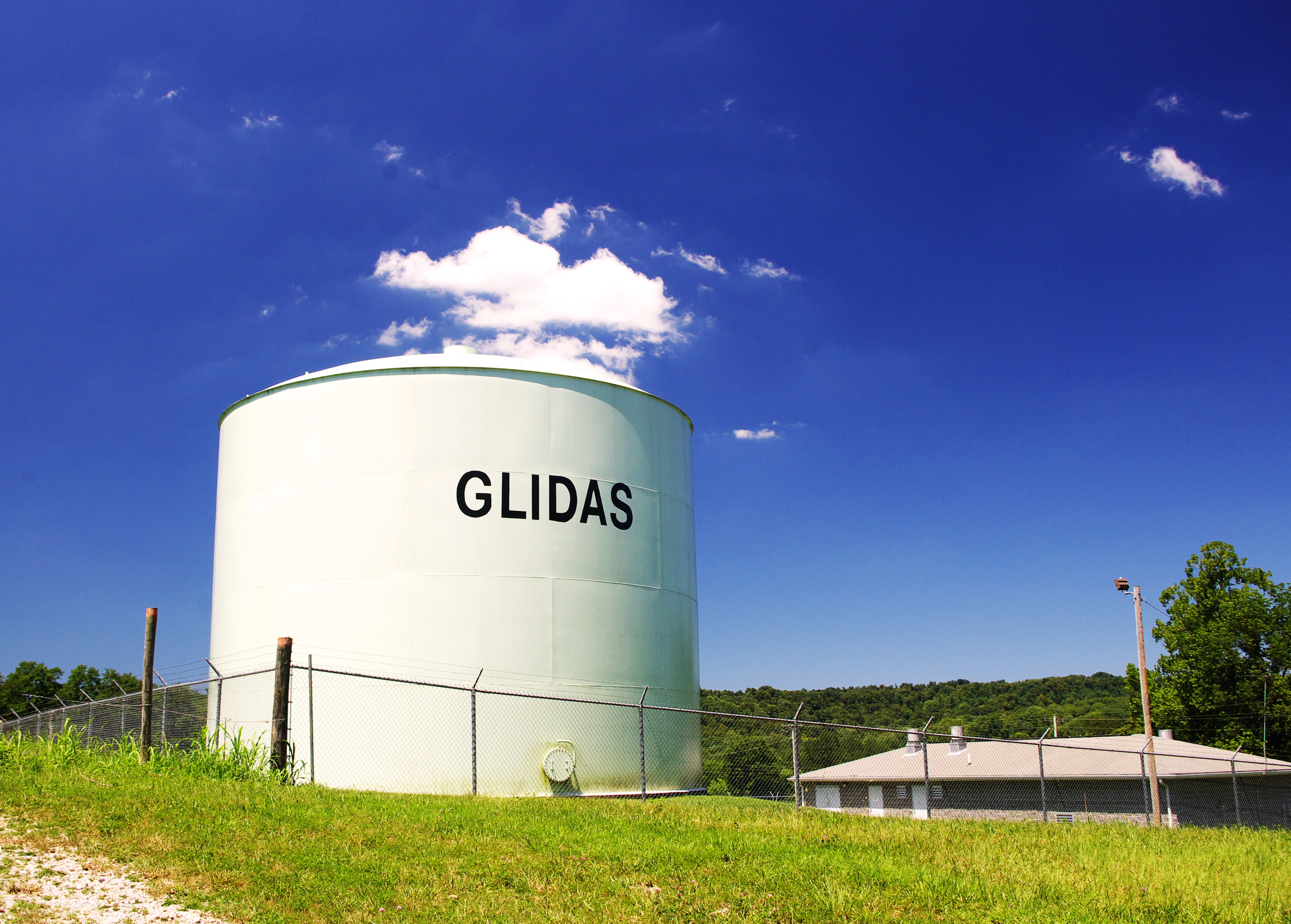
- Glidas water tower

- Harrison County's location in Indiana

- Glidas's location in Harrison County
- Coordinates: 38°03′24″N 86°11′04″W
- Country: United States
- State: Indiana
- County: Harrison
- Township: Heth
- Elevation: 679 ft (207 m)
- Time zone: UTC-5 (Eastern (EST))
  - Summer (DST): UTC-4 (EDT)
- Area code: 812
- GNIS feature ID: 435128

Glidas is an unincorporated community in the Heth Township of Harrison County, Indiana, United States. The community is concentrated around the intersection of Glidas Road SW and Hillcrest Drive, just off State Road 135 between Mauckport and Corydon. In earlier days, the community was an advance trading post for Mauckport where farm stores were collected for export on the Ohio River.

A post office was established at Glidas in 1899, and remained in operation until it was discontinued in 1905.
