= Whiskey Run Township, Crawford County, Indiana =

Whiskey Run Township
- Township
- Location of Whiskey Run Township in Crawford County
- Coordinates: 38°20′11″N 86°18′27″W
- Country: United States
- State: Indiana
- County: Crawford

Government
  - Type: Indiana township

Area
  - Total: 38.51 sq mi (99.7 km^{2})
  - Land: 38.51 sq mi (99.7 km^{2})
  - Water: 0 sq mi (0 km^{2})
- Elevation: 801 ft (244 m)

Population (2020)
  - Total: 1,937
  - Density: 50.30/sq mi (19.42/km^{2})
- FIPS code: 18-83690
- GNIS feature ID: 454051

Whiskey Run Township is one of nine townships in Crawford County, Indiana. As of the 2020 census, its population was 1,937 and it contained 871 housing units.

Historical population
| Census | Pop. | Note | %± |
|---|---|---|---|
| 1890 | 1,509 | | — |
| 1900 | 1,498 | | −0.7% |
| 1910 | 1,716 | | 14.6% |
| 1920 | 1,708 | | −0.5% |
| 1930 | 1,512 | | −11.5% |
| 1940 | 1,530 | | 1.2% |
| 1950 | 1,428 | | −6.7% |
| 1960 | 1,336 | | −6.4% |
| 1970 | 1,312 | | −1.8% |
| 1980 | 1,769 | | 34.8% |
| 1990 | 1,729 | | −2.3% |
| 2000 | 1,985 | | 14.8% |
| 2010 | 1,911 | | −3.7% |
| 2020 | 1,937 | | 1.4% |
Source: US Decennial Census

== Geography ==
According to the 2010 census, the township has a total area of 38.51 square miles (99.7 km^{2}), all land.

=== Cities and towns ===
- Milltown (west half)

=== Unincorporated towns ===
- Hogtown
- Idlewild (extinct)
- Wynnsboro (extinct)

=== Adjacent townships ===
- Posey Township, Washington County (northeast)
- Blue River Township, Harrison County (east)
- Spencer Township, Harrison County (southeast)
- Jennings Township (southwest)
- Sterling Township (west)
- Liberty Township (northwest)
- Southeast Township, Orange County (northwest)

=== Major highways ===
- Indiana State Road 64
- Indiana State Road 66

=== Cemeteries ===
The township contains four cemeteries: Saint Josephs, Union Chapel, Milltown Community and Totten.
