= Corydon Central High School =

Location
- 375 Country Club Road; Corydon, Harrison County, Indiana 47112; United States
- Coordinates: 38.200980°N 86.119405°W

Information
- Type: Public high school
- Established: 1911
- School district: South Harrison Community Schools
- Principal: Keith Marshall
- Teaching staff: 42.00 (FTE)
- Grades: 9-12
- Enrollment: 754 (2023-2024)
- Student to teacher ratio: 17.95
- Color
- Athletics conference: Mid-Southern
- Team name: Panthers
- Rivals: North Harrison Cougars
- Website: Official Website

Corydon Central High School is a public high school located in Corydon, Indiana. The school is part of the South Harrison Community School System. The school serves high school age students of Harrison Township, Washington Township, Heth Township, and Webster Township. It is the largest school in Harrison County.

In the 2007–2008 school year the school has a 79.2% graduation rate, and is attended by 786 students. The school is staffed by 45 certified teachers, two administrators, and 4 non certified teachers with an average salary of $44,706 during the 2007–2008 school year. The school has performed slightly below the statewide academic average for the last five years while meeting or surpassing statewide averages during the two years prior to that.

Corydon Central serves as the central high school for the consolidated South Harrison Community School System. Students from Corydon Elementary School, Heth-Washington Elementary School and New Middletown Elementary School are bused to Corydon Central for the high school education.

On December 5, 2008, around 200 students protested the removal of their principal. The protest attracted many local media outlets in the Southern Indiana area.

The Class of 2009 recently received approximately $1.3 million in scholarship money, an all-time high for a graduating class.

== See also ==
- List of high schools in Indiana
