= Mott Station, Indiana =

Unincorporated community in Indiana, United States

- Unincorporated community
- Harrison County's location in Indiana

- Mott Station's location in Harrison County
- Coordinates: 38°17′53″N 86°05′26″W
- Country: United States
- State: Indiana
- County: Harrison
- Township: Jackson
- Elevation: 728 ft (222 m)
- ZIP code: 47161
- FIPS code: 18-51246
- GNIS feature ID: 439510

Mott Station is an unincorporated community in Jackson Township, Harrison County, Indiana.

== History ==
Mott Station was founded in 1883. A post office was established in the community in 1888, and remained in operation until it was discontinued in 1897.
