= Hogtown =

Hogtown or Hog Town may refer to certain places in Canada or the United States:

- Hogtown, Florida, a former community in Alachua County, Florida
- Hogtown, Indiana

Nicknames:

- a historic nickname for Toronto, Ontario (see Name of Toronto)
- a historic nickname for Cincinnati, Ohio
- Hog Town, early name for King City, California

== Other uses ==
- Hogtown (film), 2016
