= Depauw, Indiana =

Unincorporated community in Indiana, United States

- Census-designated place
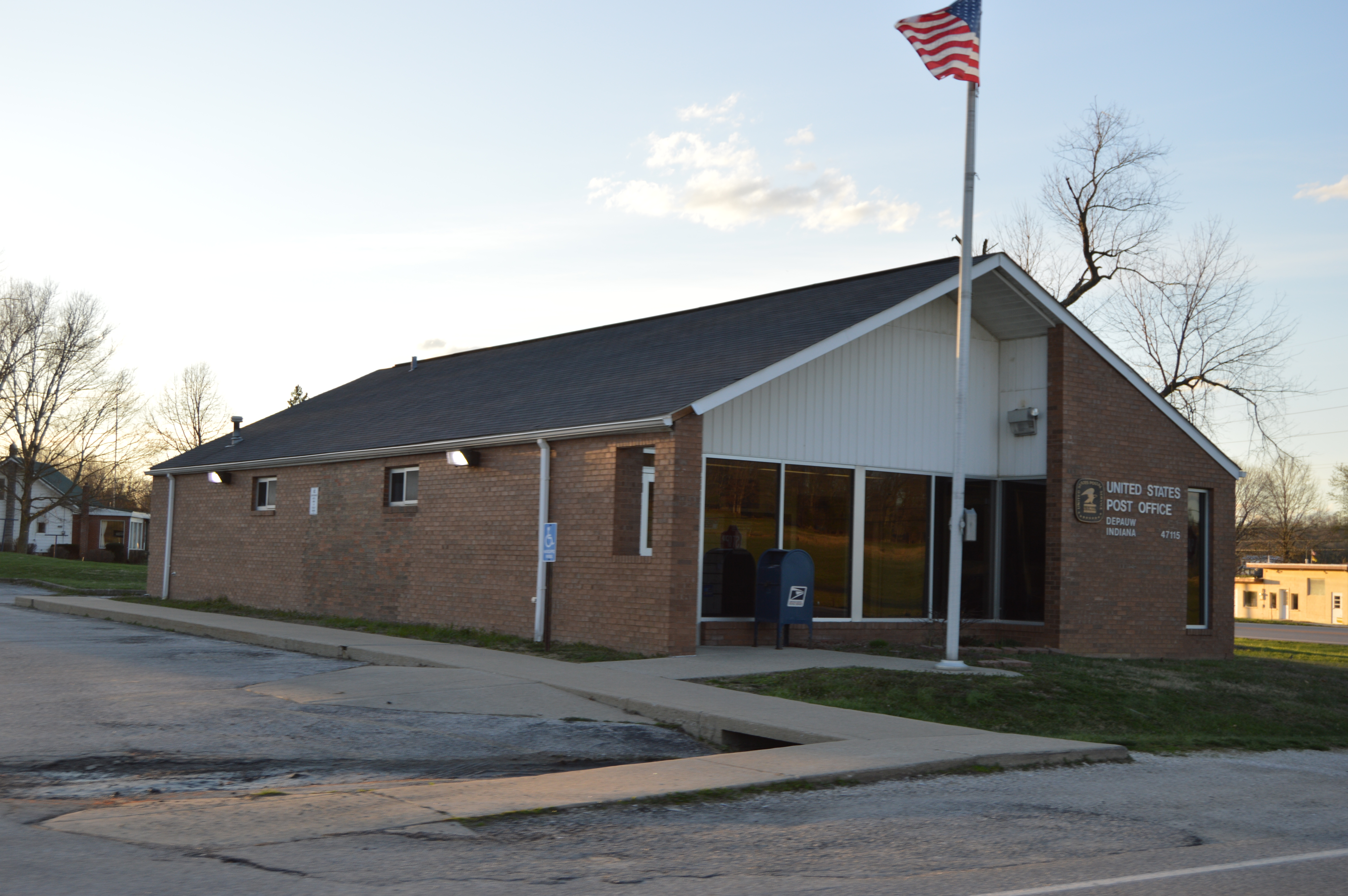
- Post Office

- Harrison County's Location In Indiana

- Depauw's Location In Harrison County
- Coordinates: 38°19′58″N 86°13′18″W
- Country: United States
- State: Indiana
- County: Harrison
- Township: Blue River, Spencer

Area
  - Total: 1.58 sq mi (4.10 km^{2})
- Elevation: 666 ft (203 m)

Population
  - Estimate (2020): 120
- Time zone: UTC-4:00 (EDT)
- ZIP code: 47115
- FIPS code: 18-17794
- GNIS feature ID: 2830404

Depauw is an unincorporated community in Blue River Township and Spencer Township, Harrison County, Indiana. The population of Depauw is officially unknown but is estimated to be 120 as of 2020 and is slowly decreasing.

== History ==
Depauw was platted by Felician Henriott on April 8, 1884. According to one source, the community may be named for Washington C. DePauw. Violent tornadoes that were recorded in Depauw include one on April 3, 1903, two on April 3, 1974, one on April 5, 1985, and one on June 2, 1990. On April 3, 1974, at around 3:20 PM, an F5 tornado hit Depauw, leaving some of the mobile homes and houses completely demolished. This tornado had formed near New Boston, IN. It kept heading east passing just west of Frenchtown, IN and then the tornado hit Depauw. Many of the Depauw locals who didn't have a basement quickly rushed to people's homes that did have one. The tornado went through Depauw and then it headed northeast towards Palmyra, IN after Depauw. The tornado killed 6 people and injured 76 people in the 68 miles (110 km) it was on the ground. The Depauw tornado was 1.6 miles (2.5 km) wide and was the first of many other F5 tornadoes that were to form on that same day in the midwest. The series of tornadoes that occurred on that day was part of what was known as the 1974 Super Outbreak.

== Geography ==
Depauw is located in northwest Harrison County.

== Demographics ==
The United States Census Bureau first delineated Depauw as a census designated place in the 2022 American Community Survey.
