= New Middletown =

New Middletown is the name of several towns in the United States:

- New Middletown, Indiana
- New Middletown, Ohio
