= Indiana State Road 337 =

State highway in Indiana, United States

State Road 337
- SR 337 highlighted in red

Route information
- Maintained by INDOT
- Length: 35.545 mi (57.204 km)

Southern segment
- Length: 22.103 mi (35.571 km)
- South end: SR 11 near Dogwood
- North end: SR 64 in Depauw

Northern segment
- Length: 13.442 mi (21.633 km)
- South end: SR 56 in Livonia
- North end: SR 37 near Orleans

Location
- Country: United States
- State: Indiana
- Counties: Harrison, Orange, Washington

Highway system
- Indiana State Highway System; Interstate; US; State; Scenic
← SR 335	→ SR 340

State Road 337 in the U.S. state of Indiana is divided into a northern section and a southern section.

== Route description ==
=== Southern section ===
The southern section is about 20 miles (32 km) long. Starting at State Road 64 in Depauw it runs along rolling hills toward Corydon. The Harrison County Hospital is located on the stretch next to Interstate 64 . An interchange with Interstate 64 is proposed to relieve traffic flow on nearby State Road 135. From Corydon, State Road 337 runs south-southeast for about twelve miles (19 km) to its southern terminus with State Road 11.

=== Northern section ===
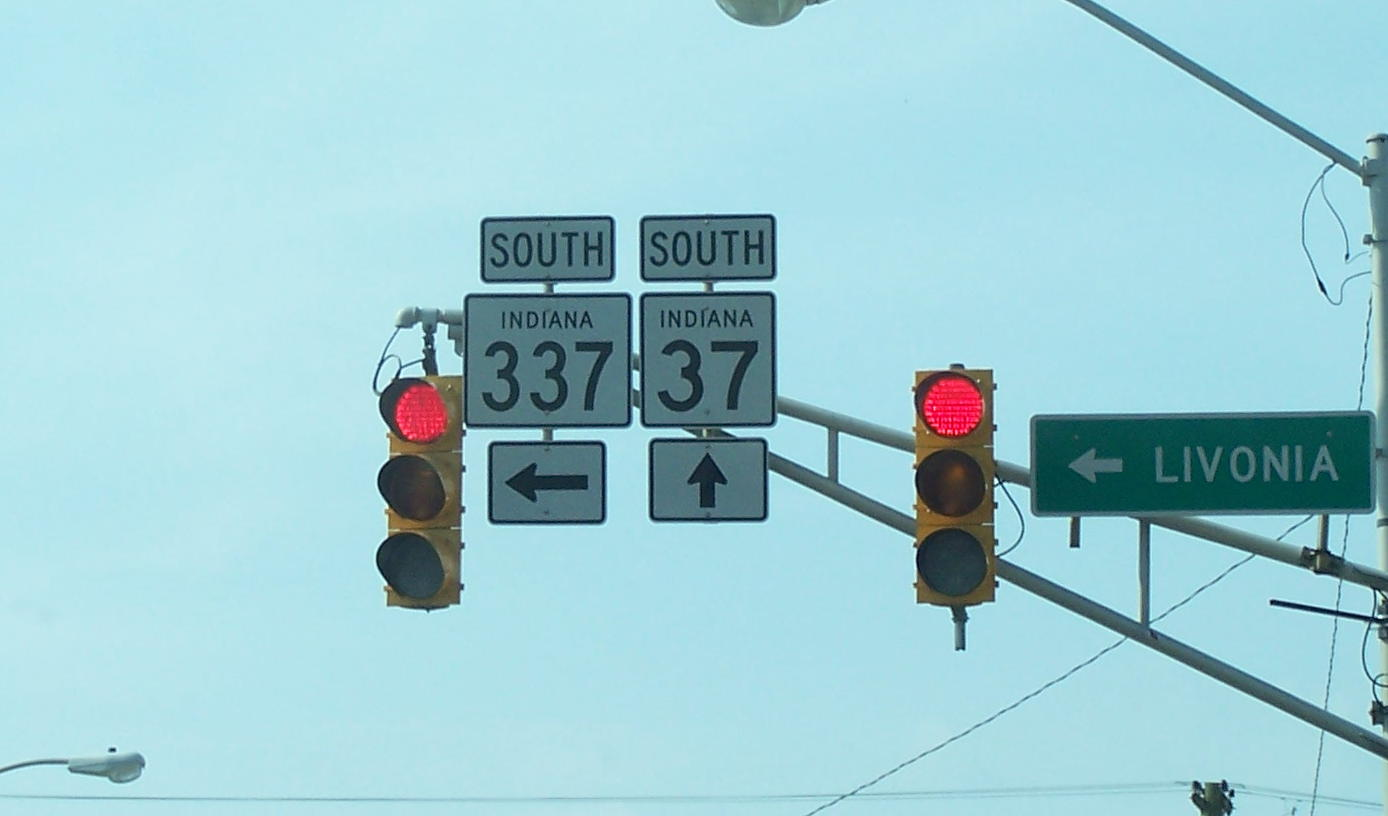
SR 337 turns left in Livonia.

The northern section begins at State Road 37 (its parent route) in Orleans, where it is concurrent with East Washington Street. Upon reaching the east edge of town, the road begins winding to the southeast. It passes through the small community of Bromer and terminates at State Road 56 just west of Livonia. It covers a distance of about 12 miles (19 km).

== Major intersections ==
County	Location	mi	km	Destinations	Notes
Harrison	Boone Township	0.000	0.000	SR 11 – Mauckport, Elizabeth	Southern terminus of SR 337
Harrison	Corydon	10.417	16.765	SR 62 east – New Albany	Southern end of SR 62 concurrency
Harrison	Corydon	10.531	16.948	SR 62 west – Dale	Northern end of SR 62 concurrency
Harrison	Corydon	12.068	19.422	SR 135 – Mauckport, Salem	
Harrison	Depauw	22.103	35.571	SR 64 – Marengo, Georgetown	Northern terminus of the southern section of SR 337
Gap in route
Washington	Livonia	22.103	35.571	SR 56 – Paoli, Salem	Southern terminus of the northern section of SR 337
Orange	Orleans	35.545	57.204	SR 37 – Paoli, Mitchell, Bedford	Northern terminus of SR 337
1.000 mi = 1.609 km; 1.000 km = 0.621 mi: Concurrency terminus
