= Byrneville, Indiana =

Unincorporated community in Indiana, United States

- Unincorporated community
- Harrison County's location in Indiana

- Location in Harrison County
- Coordinates: 38°19′39″N 86°02′37″W
- Country: United States
- State: Indiana
- County: Harrison County
- Elevation: 702 ft (214 m)
- ZIP code: 47122
- GNIS feature ID: 0431925

Byrneville is an unincorporated community in Jackson Township, Harrison County, Indiana.

== History ==
Byrneville was platted in 1838 by Temple C. Byrn, who had settled there in 1809. A post office was established at Byrneville in 1851, and remained in operation until it was discontinued in 1906.
