= Milltown, Indiana =

- Town
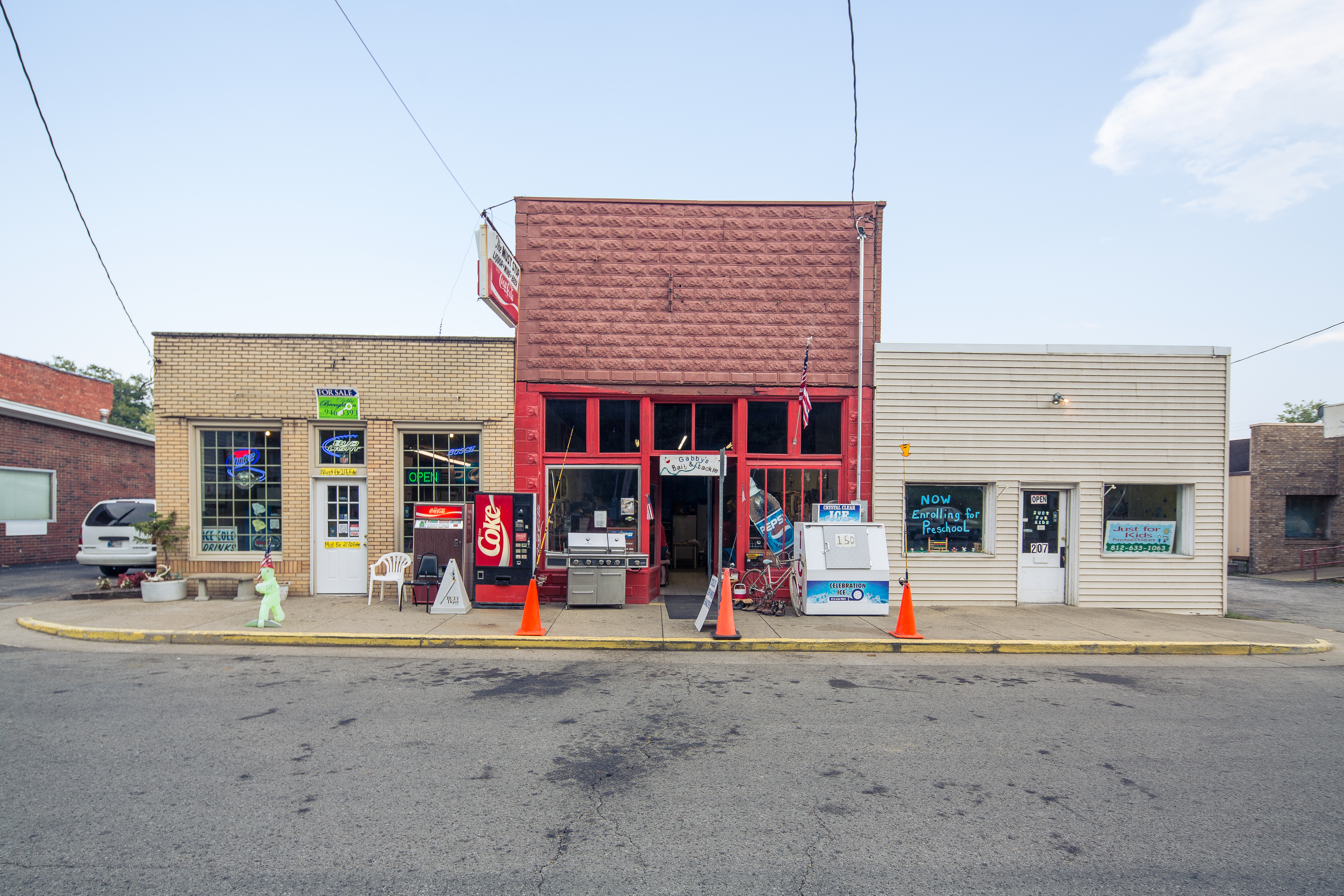

- Location of Milltown in Crawford County and Harrison County, Indiana.
- Coordinates: 38°20′32″N 86°16′32″W
- Country: United States
- State: Indiana
- Counties: Crawford, Harrison
- Townships: Whiskey Run, Blue River, Spencer

Area
  - Total: 1.33 sq mi (3.45 km^{2})
  - Land: 1.33 sq mi (3.45 km^{2})
  - Water: 0 sq mi (0.00 km^{2})
- Elevation: 597 ft (182 m)

Population (2020)
  - Total: 790
  - Density: 592.6/sq mi (228.82/km^{2})
- Time zone: UTC-5 (Eastern (EST))
  - Summer (DST): UTC-4 (EDT)
- ZIP code: 47145
- Area code: 812
- FIPS code: 18-49716
- GNIS feature ID: 2396766
- Website: Town of Milltown

Milltown is a town in Whiskey Run Township in Crawford County, Indiana and in Blue River and Spencer townships in Harrison County. As of the 2020 census, Milltown had a population of 790.

== History ==
Milltown was laid out in 1839. The community was named from the presence of a mill.

== Geography ==
According to the 2010 census, Milltown has a total area of 1.41 square miles (3.65 km^{2}), all land.

== Demographics ==
Historical population
Census	Pop.	Note	%±
1870	87		—
1880	106		21.8%
1910	586		—
1920	615		4.9%
1930	795		29.3%
1940	760		−4.4%
1950	760		0.0%
1960	793		4.3%
1970	829		4.5%
1980	1,006		21.4%
1990	917		−8.8%
2000	932		1.6%
2010	818		−12.2%
2020	790		−3.4%
U.S. Decennial Census

=== 2010 census ===
As of the census of 2010, there were 818 people, 340 households, and 221 families living in the town. The population density was 580.1 inhabitants per square mile (224.0/km^{2}). There were 396 housing units at an average density of 280.9 per square mile (108.5/km^{2}). The racial makeup of the town was 97.7% White, 0.1% Native American, 0.4% Asian, and 1.8% from two or more races.

There were 340 households, of which 30.6% had children under the age of 18 living with them, 49.7% were married couples living together, 11.2% had a female householder with no husband present, 4.1% had a male householder with no wife present, and 35.0% were non-families. 32.4% of all households were made up of individuals, and 15.6% had someone living alone who was 65 years of age or older. The average household size was 2.41 and the average family size was 3.02.

The median age in the town was 39.2 years. 24.8% of residents were under the age of 18; 8.1% were between the ages of 18 and 24; 22.9% were from 25 to 44; 26.9% were from 45 to 64; and 17.2% were 65 years of age or older. The gender makeup of the town was 48.2% male and 51.8% female.

=== 2000 census ===
As of the census of 2000, there were 932 people, 369 households, and 260 families living in the town. The population density was 662.2 inhabitants per square mile (255.7/km^{2}). There were 408 housing units at an average density of 289.9 per square mile (111.9/km^{2}). The racial makeup of the town was 97.85% White, 0.64% Native American, and 1.50% from two or more races. Hispanic or Latino of any race were 0.54% of the population.

There were 369 households, out of which 29.8% had children under the age of 18 living with them, 55.8% were married couples living together, 10.0% had a female householder with no husband present, and 29.3% were non-families. 23.8% of all households were made up of individuals, and 13.3% had someone living alone who was 65 years of age or older. The average household size was 2.51 and the average family size was 2.94.

In the town, the population was spread out, with 26.3% under the age of 18, 8.4% from 18 to 24, 27.6% from 25 to 44, 20.4% from 45 to 64, and 17.4% who were 65 years of age or older. The median age was 37 years. For every 100 females, there were 96.2 males. For every 100 females age 18 and over, there were 87.2 males.

The median income for a household in the town was $37,344, and the median income for a family was $41,339. Males had a median income of $31,125 versus $22,625 for females. The per capita income for the town was $17,746. About 8.2% of families and 13.5% of the population were below the poverty line, including 21.9% of those under age 18 and 13.6% of those age 65 or over.

== Notable people ==
- Charles Wilson Greene, professor of physiology and pharmacology
- Richard D. Young, former member of the Indiana Senate
