= Frenchtown, Indiana =

Unincorporated community in Indiana, United States

- Unincorporated community
- Harrison County's location in Indiana

- Frenchtown's location in Harrison County
- Coordinates: 38°18′53″N 86°12′52″W
- Country: United States
- State: Indiana
- County: Harrison
- Township: Spencer
- Elevation: 879 ft (268 m)
- ZIP code: 47115
- FIPS code: 18-26008
- GNIS feature ID: 434836

Frenchtown is an unincorporated community in Spencer Township, Harrison County, Indiana.

== History ==
Frenchtown was first settled in 1840 by a colony of French immigrants. A post office was established at Frenchtown in 1873, and remained in operation until it was discontinued in 1905.
