= Crandall, Indiana =

Town of Crandall, Indiana
- Town
- Location of Crandall in Harrison County, Indiana.
- Coordinates: 38°17′17″N 86°03′57″W
- Country: United States
- State: Indiana
- County: Harrison
- Township: Jackson

Area
  - Total: 0.10 sq mi (0.27 km^{2})
  - Land: 0.10 sq mi (0.27 km^{2})
  - Water: 0 sq mi (0.00 km^{2})
- Elevation: 663 ft (202 m)

Population (2020)
  - Total: 134
  - Density: 1,288.1/sq mi (497.33/km^{2})
- Time zone: UTC-5 (EST)
  - Summer (DST): UTC-4 (EDT)
- ZIP code: 47114
- Area code: 812
- FIPS code: 18-15634
- GNIS feature ID: 2396666
- Website: www.townofcrandall.org

Crandall is a town in Jackson Township, Harrison County, Indiana, United States. As of the 2020 census, Crandall had a population of 134.

== Geography ==
According to the 2010 census, Crandall has a total area of 0.1 square miles (0.26 km^{2}), all land.

== Demographics ==
Historical population
Census	Pop.	Note	%±
1900	137		—
1910	133		−2.9%
1920	133		0.0%
1930	132		−0.8%
1940	146		10.6%
1950	149		2.1%
1960	166		11.4%
1970	188		13.3%
1980	176		−6.4%
1990	147		−16.5%
2000	131		−10.9%
2010	152		16.0%
2020	134		−11.8%
U.S. Decennial Census

=== 2010 census ===
As of the census of 2010, there were 152 people, 66 households, and 43 families residing in the town. The population density was 1,520.0 inhabitants per square mile (586.9/km^{2}). There were 73 housing units at an average density of 730.0 per square mile (281.9/km^{2}). The racial makeup of the town was 98.0% White, 1.3% Native American, and 0.7% Asian. Hispanic or Latino of any race were 2.6% of the population.

There were 66 households, of which 30.3% had children under the age of 18 living with them, 45.5% were married couples living together, 12.1% had a female householder with no husband present, 7.6% had a male householder with no wife present, and 34.8% were non-families. 27.3% of all households were made up of individuals, and 10.6% had someone living alone who was 65 years of age or older. The average household size was 2.30 and the average family size was 2.70.

The median age in the town was 45.5 years. 25% of residents were under the age of 18; 4.6% were between the ages of 18 and 24; 19.7% were from 25 to 44; 32.9% were from 45 to 64; and 17.8% were 65 years of age or older. The gender makeup of the town was 50.0% male and 50.0% female.

=== 2000 census ===
As of the census of 2000, there were 131 people, 56 households, and 38 families residing in the town. The population density was 1,276.6 inhabitants per square mile (492.9/km^{2}). There were 62 housing units at an average density of 604.2 per square mile (233.3/km^{2}). The racial makeup of the town was 99.24% White, and 0.76% from two or more races. Hispanic or Latino of any race were 0.76% of the population.

There were 56 households, out of which 26.8% had children under the age of 18 living with them, 55.4% were married couples living together, 8.9% had a female householder with no husband present, and 32.1% were non-families. 32.1% of all households were made up of individuals, and 14.3% had someone living alone who was 65 years of age or older. The average household size was 2.34 and the average family size was 2.92.

In the town, the population was spread out, with 19.8% under the age of 18, 8.4% from 18 to 24, 26.0% from 25 to 44, 29.0% from 45 to 64, and 16.8% who were 65 years of age or older. The median age was 42 years. For every 100 females, there were 92.6 males. For every 100 females age 18 and over, there were 84.2 males.

The median income for a household in the town was $33,333, and the median income for a family was $41,250. Males had a median income of $31,875 versus $17,292 for females. The per capita income for the town was $15,224. There were 7.5% of families and 9.6% of the population living below the poverty line, including 8.0% of under eighteens and 23.8% of those over 64.

== History ==
=== Etymology ===
The name Crandall is derived from its founder Cornelius F. Crandall. It is often pronounced with the d belonging to the first syllable (e.g. Crand•all). The first syllable has a soft 'a'. The second syllable is stressed with a soft 'a' and a long 'l'.

=== Founding ===
Crandall was laid out in 1872 by its namesake, Cornelius F. Crandall. Cornelius persuaded the builders of the Southern Railway (US) to move the planned route for their line through the area from its original surveyed path north of the present day State Highway 64 to its present path through the town of Crandall. Cornelius later moved to Texas where he founded Crandall, Texas

=== The Great Fire ===
In 1921 there was a great fire that destroyed a store and warehouse, the post office, and several houses on the east side of town; eleven buildings were destroyed in all. The town sprang back from the destruction, and by 1936 Al Gerdon of the Corydon Democrat writes of the businessmen of Crandall. He tells of an insurance salesman, the Crandall branch of the Harrison County Bank, the feed store, two general stores, the main office for the Harrison County Farm Bureau Corporation, Incorporated, and the well-known fox chasing conventions consisted of about seventy-five dogs that would chase the foxes on the outskirts of town.

=== Early years ===
During the 1930s Crandall became known for its saw mill and hatcheries that used the train to ship the baby chicks. Clarence A. Sims, the owner of the Thornwood Poultry Yards, introduced the world's largest incubator at that time. It was fifty-eight by ten feet and took a carload of eggs to fill its 315,000-egg capacity that enabled the hatchery to set 105,000 eggs every week. Sixteen breeds of chickens were hatched and delivered to "every state east of the Rocky Mountains." In June 1953 the passenger service ended thus leaving a freight line as the only rail service between Louisville and St. Louis.
