= Fairdale =

Fairdale may refer to one of the following places:

== Australia ==
- Fairdale, Queensland, a locality in the South Burnett Region, Queensland

== South Africa ==
- Fairdale, Cape Town

== United States ==
- Fairdale, Illinois
- Fairdale, Indiana
- Fairdale, Louisville, Kentucky
- Fairdale, North Dakota
- Fairdale, Pennsylvania

== See also ==
- Fairfield (disambiguation)
