= Harrison County, Indiana =

County in Indiana, United States

- County
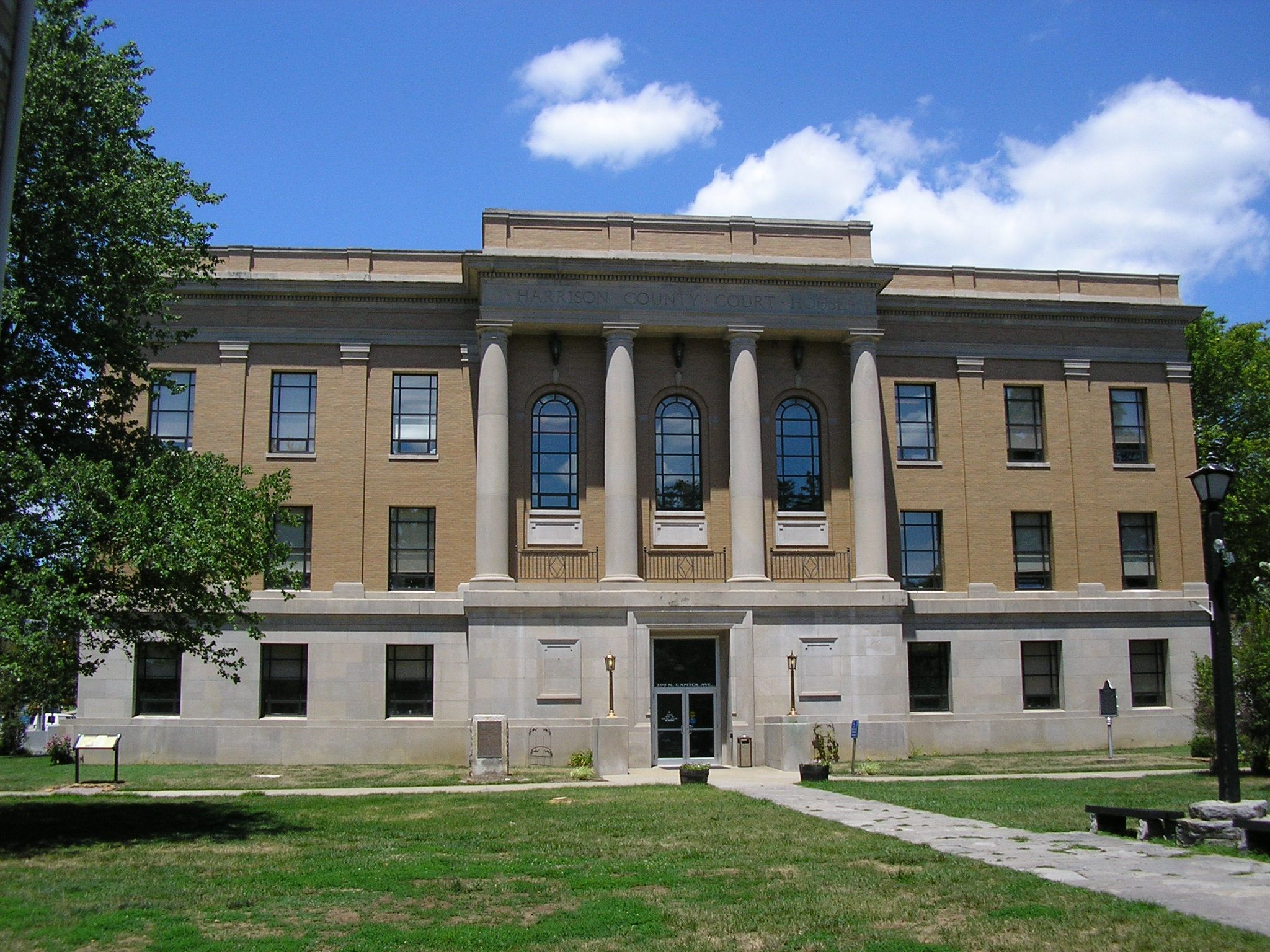
- Harrison County Courthouse in Corydon, built in 1928

- Location within the U.S. state of Indiana
- Coordinates: 38°12′N 86°07′W
- Country: United States
- State: Indiana
- Founded: December 1, 1808
- Named for: William Henry Harrison
- Seat: Corydon
- Largest city: Corydon

Area
  - Total: 486.52 sq mi (1,260.1 km^{2})
  - Land: 484.52 sq mi (1,254.9 km^{2})
  - Water: 2.00 sq mi (5.2 km^{2}) 0.41%

Population (2020)
  - Total: 39,654
  - Estimate (2025): 40,437 ▲
  - Density: 81.842/sq mi (31.599/km^{2})
- Time zone: UTC−5 (Eastern)
  - Summer (DST): UTC−4 (EDT)
- Congressional district: 9th
- Website: in.gov/counties/harrison
- Indiana county #31; Fourth oldest county in state FIPS Code 061

Harrison County is located in the far southern part of the U.S. state of Indiana along the Ohio River. The county was officially established in 1808. Its population was 39,654 as of the 2020 United States census. Its county seat is Corydon, the former capital of Indiana.

Harrison County is part of the Louisville-Jefferson County, KY-IN Metropolitan Statistical Area.

The county has a diverse economy with no sector employing more than 13% of the local workforce. Caesars Southern Indiana is the largest employer, and the Harrison County Hospital being the second largest. Tourism plays a significant role in the economy and is centered on the county's many historic sites. County government is divided among several bodies including the boards of the county's three school districts, three elected commissioners who exercise legislative and executive powers, an elected county council that controls the county budget, a circuit and superior court, and township trustees in the county's 12 townships. The county has 10 incorporated towns with a total population of over 5,000, as well as many small unincorporated towns. One Interstate highway and one U. S. Route run through the county, as do eight Indiana State Roads and two railroad lines.

Migratory groups of Native Americans inhabited the area for thousands of years. The first European settlements in what would become Harrison County were created by American settlers in the years after the American Revolutionary War. The population grew rapidly during first decade of the 19th century. Corydon was platted in 1808 and became the capital of the Indiana Territory in 1813. Many of the state's early important historic events occurred in the county, including the writing of Indiana's first constitution. Corydon was the state capital until 1825, but in the years afterward remained an important hub for southern Indiana. In 1859 there was a major meteorite strike. In 1863 the Battle of Corydon was fought, the only battle of the American Civil War to occur in Indiana.

== History ==
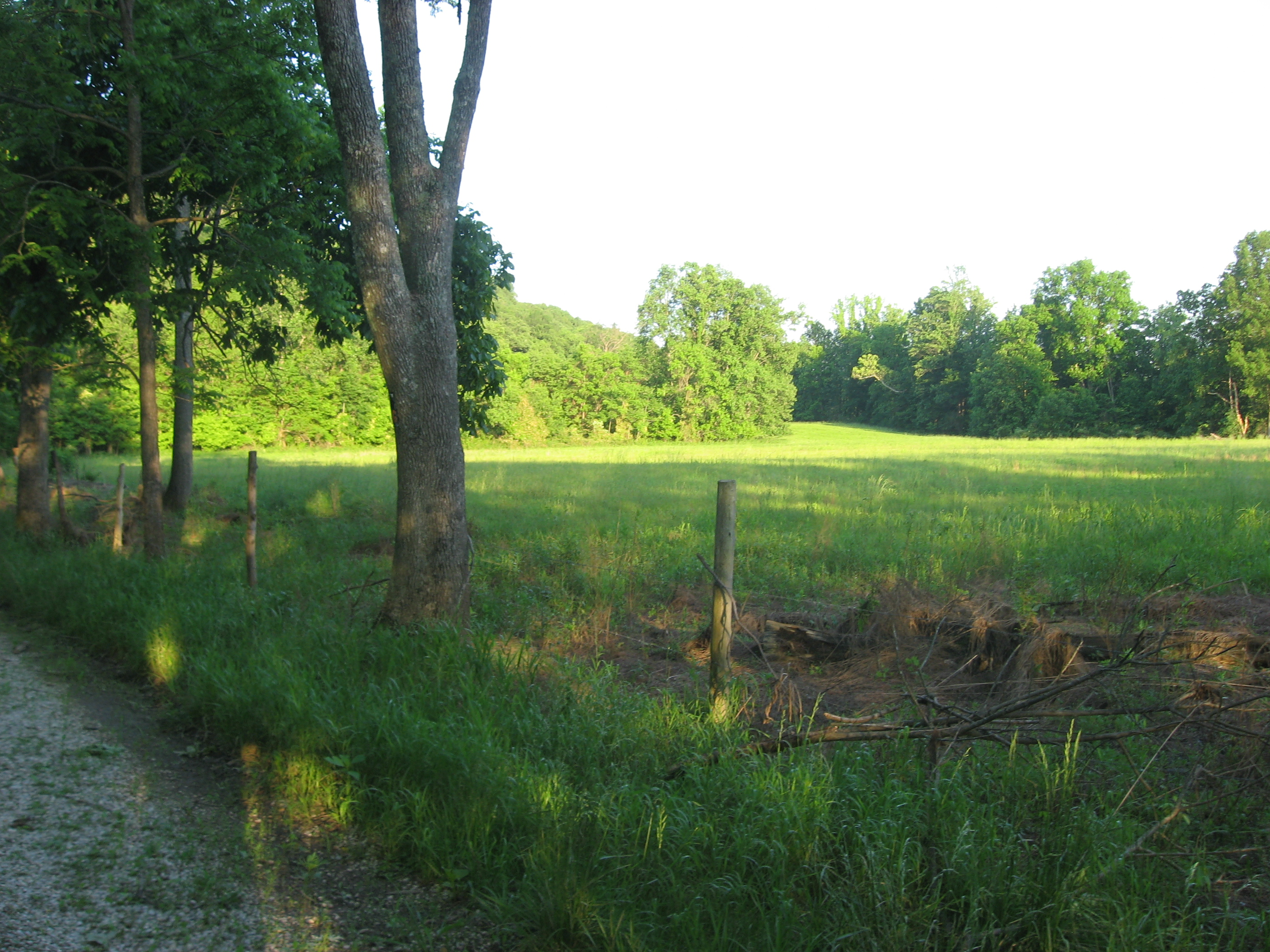
Swan's Landing Site

Humans first entered what would become Indiana near the end of the last ice age. This region was of particular value to the early humans because of the abundance of flint. There is evidence of flint mining in local caves as early as 2000 BCE; the stone was used to produce crude tools. Passing migratory tribes frequented the area which was influenced by succeeding groups of peoples including the Hopewells and Mississippians. One flint-working and camping location is the Swan's Landing Archeological Site, one of the most important Early Archaic archaeological sites in eastern North America. Permanent human settlements in the county began with the arrival of American settlers in the last decade of the 18th century.

The area became part of the United States following its conquest during the American Revolutionary War. Veterans of the revolution received land grants in the eastern part of the county as part of Clark's Grant. Daniel Boone and his brother Squire Boone were early explorers of the county, entering from Kentucky in the 1780s. Harvey Heth, Spier Spencer, and Edward Smith were among the first to settle in the county beginning in the 1790s. Smith built the first home in the area of Corydon.

Harrison County was originally part of Knox County and Clark County but was separated in 1808. It was the first Indiana county formed by the Indiana territorial legislature instead of the Governor, and the fourth to be formed in the future state of Indiana (after Knox and Clark; also Dearborn County was formed in 1803 when the eastern territory borderline with Ohio was adjusted to transfer the "Gore" to Indiana Territory). Portions of the county were later separated into parts of Crawford, Floyd, Washington, Jackson, Clark, Lawrence, Perry, Scott and Orange Counties. The county was named for William Henry Harrison, the first governor of Indiana Territory, a General in War of 1812, hero of Tippecanoe, and the 9th U.S. President. Harrison was the largest land holder in the county at the time and had a small estate at Harrison Spring.

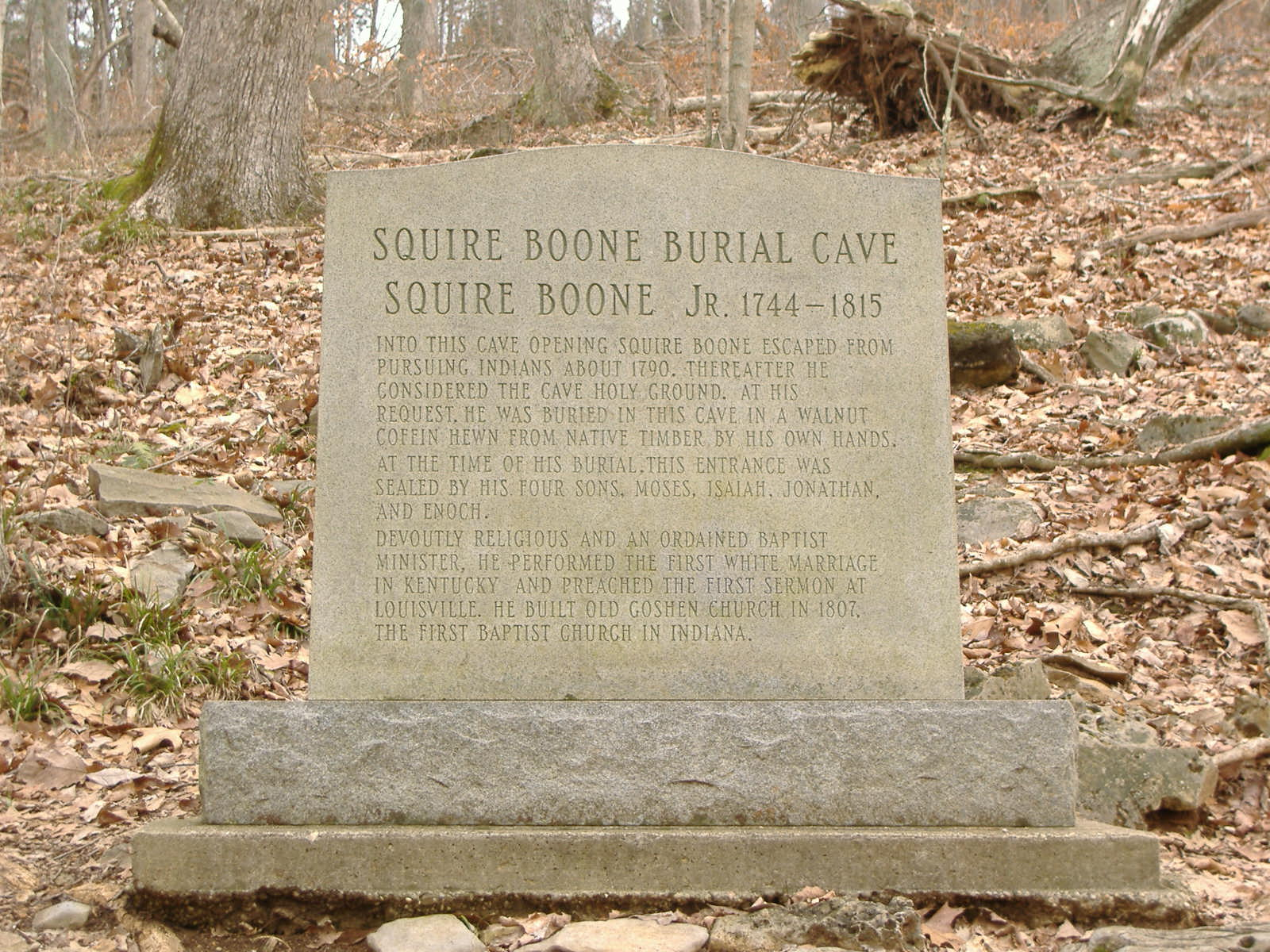
Original burial site marker of Squire Boone

Squire Boone settled in what is now Boone Township in 1806. He died in 1815 and is buried in a cave near his home, Squire Boone Caverns. James, Isaiah, and Daniel (son of Squire) Boone settled in Harrison County's Heth Township during the first decade of the 1800s. The county's first church was built by Boone east of present-day Laconia. The church, which has been reconstructed, is known as Old Goshen. Jacob Kintner settled near Corydon in about 1810. He was one of the wealthiest settlers and amassed a 700-acre (2.8 km^{2}) tract of land around Corydon, built a large home, and maintained an inn. Paul and Susannah Mitchem became Quakers and immigrated to Harrison County from North Carolina in 1814, bringing with them 107 slaves whom they freed after arriving. Although some of the former slaves left, the group became one of the largest communities of free black people in the state.

The first road was built in Harrison County in 1809 connecting Corydon with Mauckport on the Ohio River. A tow-and-ferry line was operated there by the Mauck family bringing settlers into the county from Kentucky. This road and ferry greatly expanded the county's economic viability and ease of access to the outside world, leading to a rapid settlement of the area. The county's population more than doubled in the following decade.

Dennis Pennington, who lived near Lanesville, became one of the county's early leading citizens and speaker of the territory's legislature. Corydon began competing with other southern Indiana settlements to become the new capital of the territory after its reorganization in 1809. Hostilities broke out in 1811 with the Native American tribes on the frontier, and the territorial capital was moved to Corydon on May 1, 1813, after Pennington suggested that it would be safer than Vincennes. For the next twelve years, Corydon was the political center of the territory and subsequent state. A state constitution was drafted in Corydon during June 1816 and after statehood (December 1816) the town served as the state capital until 1825.

The first division of the county occurred in 1814 when the northern portion of the county was separated to become Washington County. In 1818 the western part of the county was partitioned off to become Crawford County. In 1819 Floyd County was created out of the eastern part of the county. Since that time, Harrison County's eastern border has had minor adjustments through land transactions with Floyd County; the last change occurred in 1968.

The northern part of the county is known as the barrens, named by the early settlers for its scarce timber. At first, settlers preferred the southern areas where wood was available. The barrens were swept by annual wildfires that prevented the growth of trees. The largest barren ran from the northern edge of Corydon northward to Palmyra, and from the Floyd Knobs in the east, westward to the Blue River. The Central Barren covered most of the upper middle part of the county. As settlement expanded and farming grew in the early 19th century, settlers found the barrens to be fertile farmland, and they were quickly settled. As settlement increased, the wildfires were stopped and by the start of the 20th century the uninhabited parts of the barrens had become forested and have remained so until modern times. A large meteorite fell near Buena Vista on March 28, 1859. The impact site and a part of the meteorite have been preserved.

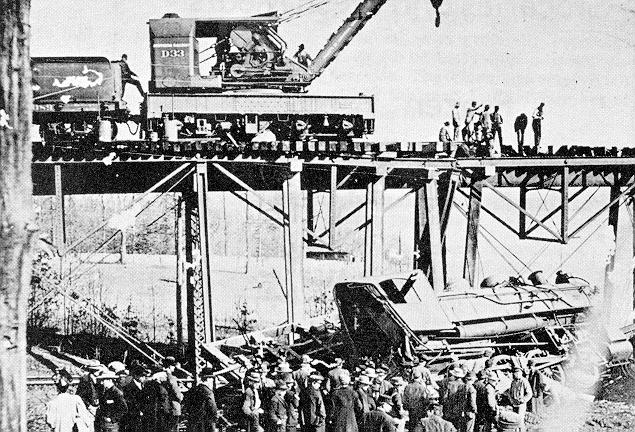
A train wreck at the Corydon Junction's southern trestle (January 19, 1902)

The first Harrison County fair was held in Corydon in 1860; it has been an annual event since then and is the state's longest continuously running fair. The county fairground was built in Corydon on Edward Smith's former homesite. The original grandstand burned in 1960 and the county purchased a new grandstand from the minor league baseball team at Parkway Field in Louisville, Kentucky.

The only Civil War battle fought in Indiana occurred in Harrison County on July 9, 1863, between the Harrison County Legion and a Confederate group under Brigadier General John Hunt Morgan, during Morgan's Raid. Morgan crossed the Ohio River into Harrison County in the early hours of daylight, resisted by artillery fire from the Indiana shore and an armed river boat. Confederate artillery returned fire from the opposite shore, and the Legion retreated towards Corydon. The citizens of Mauckport fled the town carrying their valuables. Morgan landed on the east side of Mauckport with two thousand cavalry and marched north burning homes, farms, and mills. The county militia made a stand to block his advance on the county seat and the resulting conflict is known as the Battle of Corydon. The battle was won by the Confederates and the town of Corydon was then sacked and stores were looted and ransomed. The battle left 4 dead, 12 wounded, and 355 captured. After the battle, Morgan continued into northern Harrison County where he looted the New Salisbury area with the main body of troops. Crandall and Palmyra were robbed and sacked by detachments. His forces left the county the following day; they were eventually defeated and captured by Union Army forces.

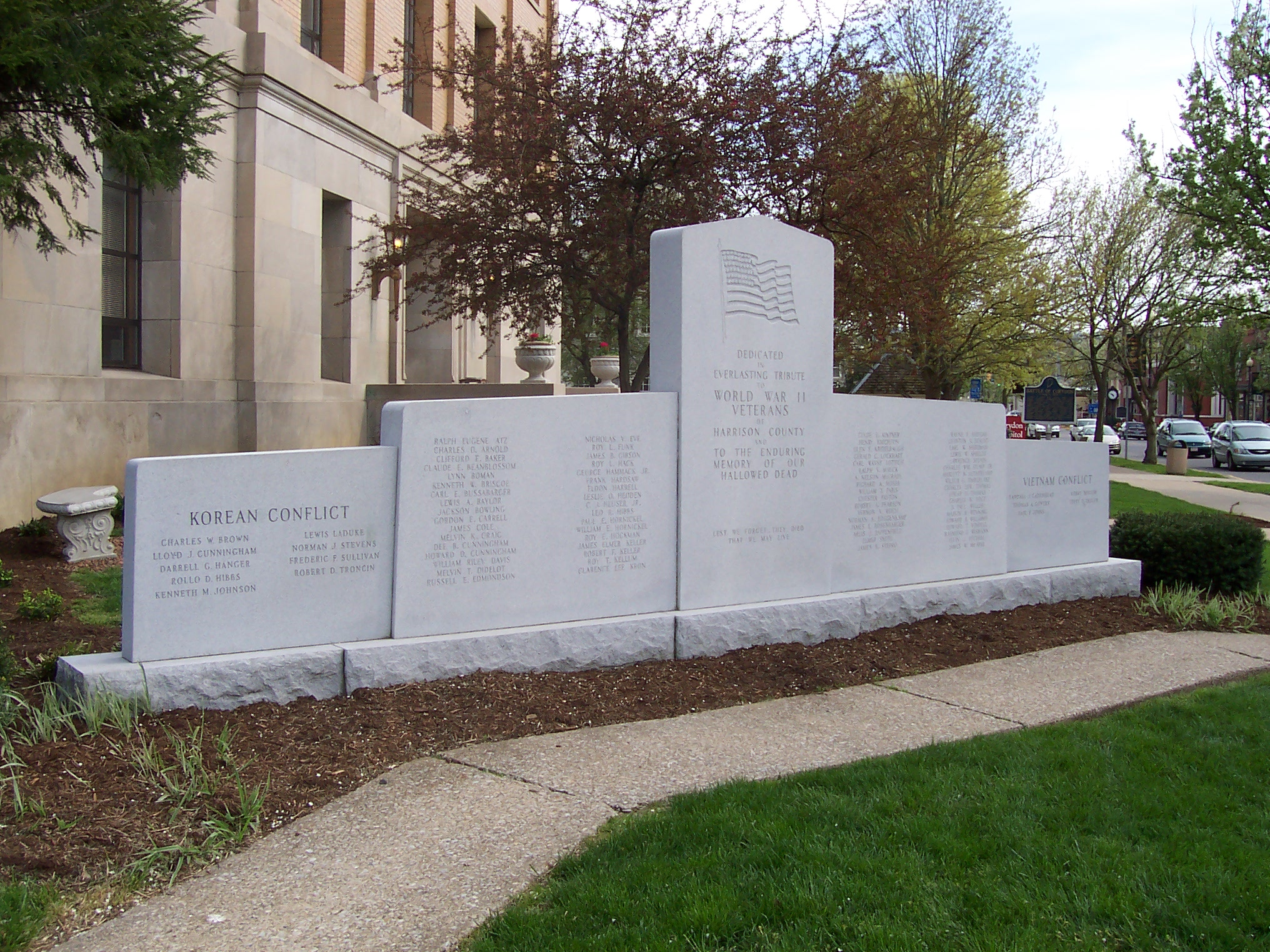
The Harrison County memorial to the county's war casualties

The railroad reached Harrison County in 1869. A line was completed across the northern half of county in 1874 running from Floyd County connecting Crandall and then continuing west into Crawford County. A southward extension connecting Corydon to Crandall was completed in 1882. A train wreck killed three in 1902. The southern extension connecting Corydon was purchased by the Corydon Scenic Railroad Company in 1989. It operated as a tourist attraction until its 2003 closing, which ended passenger service in the county.

The first county courthouse was a small log building. When Corydon became the territory capital in 1813, county and territorial officials shared the building. By 1816 a stone building had been constructed, and it served as both Harrison County Courthouse and the state capital building until the capital was moved in 1825. As more space was needed, other buildings were constructed to supplement the courthouse. In the 1920s, the latest of these office buildings was razed to make way for a new courthouse; the old building was acquired by the State of Indiana and preserved as the first state capitol building. The new courthouse was completed in 1928 at a cost of about $250,000. (Note: A $250,000 capital expense in 1928 would be roughly equivalent to $14,500,000 in 2010.) The building was designed by Fowler and Karges of Evansville and was constructed by J. Fred Beggs and Company of Scottsburg. The Harrison-Crawford State Forest was started in 1932 when the State of Indiana purchased land in western Harrison County. The 26,000-acre (110 km^{2}) park is the largest state forest in Indiana and surrounds the O'Bannon Woods State Park, as well as the Wyandotte Caves located in eastern Crawford County.

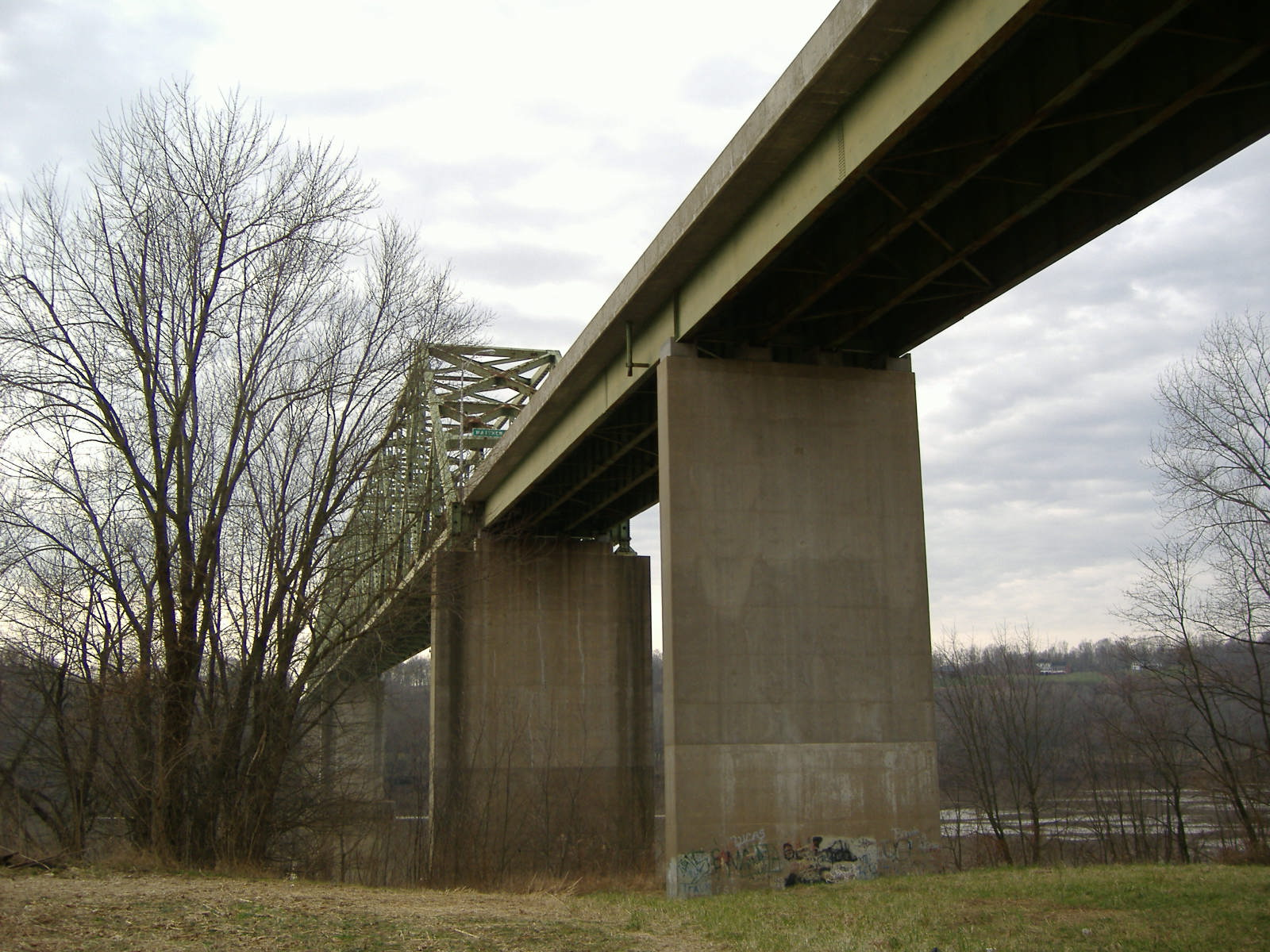
The Matthew E Welsh Bridge

The Matthew E. Welsh Bridge was completed in 1966 in Mauckport, to connect Harrison County with neighboring Meade County in Kentucky. This is the only bridge over the Ohio River between Tell City and New Albany. In 1969 Samuel Hays donated the 311-acre (1.26 km^{2}) Hayswood Nature Reserve to the county. It was developed in 1973 by the Harrison County Park Board by adding public facilities to the western part of the preserve. It is the second-largest nature reserve in the county.

Caesars Indiana opened a casino river boat, hotel complex, and golf course in 1998, boosting the county's tourism industry. The casino complex was purchased and became Horseshoe Southern Indiana on July 11, 2008.

== Geography ==
Map of Harrison County, showing townships, settlements, and major highways

Harrison County is located in the far southern part of Indiana, about halfway between the state's east and west borders. The Ohio River defines the county's southern border; across the river lies the state of Kentucky and the city of Louisville. The Blue River defines most of the county's western border; a straight north–south section of the border exists near the line's midpoint.

The county terrain was heavily forested in its lower half when settlers arrived. At present, a portion is still wooded, with the remainer devoted to agriculture or urban development. The terrain slopes to the south and west, with its highest point (972 feet/296 meters ASL) on Lagle Ridge, 2 miles (3.2 km) NE of Depauw.

The western part of the county is drained by the Blue River, flowing southward. The central part is drained by the southwest-flowing Indian Creek, and the lower part of the county is drained by the three forks of Indian Creek. There are only large two bodies of water (other than rivers) within the county's borders, and both are man-made: Lake Coleman is part of Buffalo Trace Park near Palmyra, and the middle fork of Buck Creek has been dammed in Posey Township. There are also smaller bodies, such as the pool at the discharge of Harrison Spring, an abandoned stretch of the Ohio River near the discharge point of Indian Creek, known as "Overflow Pond", and a small pond one mile (1.6 km) ESE of Lanesville.

According to the 2010 United States census, the county has a total area of 486.52 square miles (1,260.1 km^{2}), of which 484.52 square miles (1,254.9 km^{2}) (or 99.59%) is land and 2.00 square miles (5.2 km^{2}) (or 0.41%) is water.

Harrison Spring is located west of Corydon; it is 60 feet (18 m) in diameter and is over 40 feet (12 m) deep, making it the largest and deepest spring in Indiana. It rises from a solid rock in a level spot of land, and its flow was sufficient to power flour mills in the past. Is the largest spring by volume in Indiana producing over 3 million gallons (11 million liters) of water daily. The name recognizes William Henry Harrison, who owned this area.

Harrison County is hilly in parts. The Knobstone Escarpment begins in the southeastern part of the county, rises sharply at the Ohio River, and runs along the eastern edge of the county. The "knobs" are the most significant series of hills in Indiana, with the highest knobs near the Ohio River towering 610 feet (190 m) over the surrounding valley. This is the greatest local relief difference in the state.

Although the county was largely forested prior to settlement, an island prairie existed in the county's southern half. This was the most isolated and furthest south occurrence of prairie habitat in Indiana. A remnant section of this prairie, adjoining by a larger section of restored prairie, comprises the easternmost section of O'Bannon Woods State Park. A 0.8 mile guided trail through the prairie is open to the public.

The western part of the county is preserved as the Harrison-Crawford State Forest and the O'Bannon Woods State Park. The county has extensive cave systems including Squire Boone Caverns, the Binkley Cave System (Indiana Caverns) and smaller, highly decorated caves such as Jewel Box and Devil's Graveyard caves.

=== Adjacent counties ===
- Washington County – north
- Floyd County – east
- Hardin County, Kentucky – southeast
- Jefferson County, Kentucky – east
- Meade County, Kentucky – southwest
- Crawford County – west

=== Towns and incorporated communities ===
- Corydon (county seat)
- Crandall
- Elizabeth
- Laconia
- Lanesville
- Mauckport
- Milltown
- New Amsterdam
- New Middletown
- Palmyra

=== Unincorporated communities ===
- Bradford
- Bridgeport
- Buena Vista
- Byrneville
- Central
- Central Barren
- Corydon Junction
- Depauw
- Dogwood
- Evans Landing
- Fairdale
- Fishtown
- Frenchtown
- Glidas
- Moberly
- Mott
- New Boston
- New Salisbury (Census-designated place)
- Ramsey
- Rosewood
- Valley City
- White Cloud

=== Townships ===
- Blue River
- Boone
- Franklin
- Harrison
- Heth
- Jackson
- Morgan
- Posey
- Spencer
- Taylor
- Washington
- Webster

=== Ghost towns ===
- Wynnsboro

=== Incorporated communities by population ===
Town	Township	Population	Founded
Corydon	Harrison	2,715	1808
Crandall	Jackson	131	1872
Elizabeth	Posey	137	1812
Laconia	Boone	73	1837
Lanesville	Franklin	614	1817
Mauckport	Heth	83	1827
Milltown	Blue River	932*	1827
New Amsterdam	Washington	27	1815
New Middletown	Webster	77	1860
Palmyra	Morgan	930	1810

== Climate and weather ==
Corydon, Indiana

Climate chart (precipitation, max. and min. temperature)
J	F	M	A	M	J	J	A	S	O	N	D
3.7 41 21	3.5 48 24	4.8 59 33	4.7 69 41	5.1 77 49	4.8 85 59	4.2 88 63	3.9 87 61	3.6 81 53	3.1 70 41	4.4 57 34	4 46 25
- █ Average max. and min. temperatures in °F
- █ Precipitation totals in inches
- Source: The Weather Channel
Metric conversion
J	F	M	A	M	J	J	A	S	O	N	D
93 5 −6	89 9 −4	122 15 1	120 21 5	129 25 9	122 29 15	108 31 17	99 31 16	90 27 12	80 21 5	110 14 1	101 8 −4
- █ Average max. and min. temperatures in °C
- █ Precipitation totals in mm

Harrison County is in the humid subtropical climate region of the United States along with most of Southern Indiana. Its Köppen climate classification is Dfa, meaning that it is cold, has no dry season, and has a hot summer. However, it is close to the southern edge of this region. In recent years, average temperatures in Corydon have ranged from a low of 21 °F (−6 °C) in January to a high of 88 °F (31 °C) in July, although a record low of −31 °F (−35 °C) was recorded in January 1977 and a record high of 104 °F (40 °C) was recorded in July 1983. Average monthly precipitation ranged from 3.13 inches (80 mm) in October to 5.06 inches (129 mm) in May.

== Government ==
The county government is a constitutional body and is granted specific powers by the Constitution of Indiana and by the Indiana Code. Executive and legislative power is vested in the Board of Commissioners, and fiscal power is vested in the County Council.

The seven member county council controls spending and revenue collection in the county. Four representatives are elected from county districts and three are elected at-large. The council members serve four-year terms. They are responsible for setting salaries, the annual budget, and special spending. The council has limited authority to impose local income, property, excise and service taxes. County income and property taxes are subject to state level approval.

The Board of Commissioners consists of three commissioners who are elected county-wide in four–year staggered terms. One commissioner serves as president of the board. The commissioners manage the budget set forth by the council, collect revenue, enact and repeal ordinances, and manage the county government.

Harrison County has a Circuit Court and a Superior Court. The Superior Court handles adult criminal cases, small claims cases, traffic tickets, and infractions. The Circuit Court handles the rest of the cases in the county, including most of the divorce cases, juvenile matters, CHINS cases, civil proceedings, probate, estates, adoptions and civil commitments. Judges in each court serve a six-year term. The Judge of the Circuit Court appoints a referee to handle family law cases.

The county has other elected offices, including sheriff, coroner, auditor, treasurer, recorder, surveyor and circuit court clerk. Each serves a four–year term. Members elected to county government positions are required to declare party affiliations and to be residents of the county.

Each township has a trustee who administers rural fire protection and ambulance service, provides poor relief and manages cemetery care, among other duties. The trustee is assisted in these duties by a three-member township board. The trustees and board members are elected to four-year terms.

Most of Harrison County lies in State House District 70. Blue River Township is part of State House District 73. The entire county is part of State Senate District 47. The county is part of Indiana's 9th congressional district.

United States presidential election results for Harrison County, Indiana
Year	Republican		Democratic		Third party(ies)	
Year	No.	%	No.	%	No.	%
1888	2,133	44.76%	2,529	53.07%	103	2.16%
1892	2,114	43.75%	2,464	50.99%	254	5.26%
1896	2,486	46.48%	2,813	52.59%	50	0.93%
1900	2,482	45.92%	2,824	52.25%	99	1.83%
1904	2,544	48.09%	2,530	47.83%	216	4.08%
1908	2,419	46.17%	2,646	50.51%	174	3.32%
1912	900	20.23%	2,106	47.34%	1,443	32.43%
1916	2,086	44.97%	2,373	51.15%	180	3.88%
1920	4,271	51.45%	3,898	46.96%	132	1.59%
1924	3,896	48.31%	4,005	49.67%	163	2.02%
1928	4,440	54.43%	3,664	44.91%	54	0.66%
1932	3,553	40.36%	5,128	58.25%	123	1.40%
1936	3,885	43.23%	5,025	55.92%	76	0.85%
1940	4,650	49.26%	4,725	50.06%	64	0.68%
1944	4,397	50.05%	4,285	48.77%	104	1.18%
1948	4,104	46.90%	4,465	51.02%	182	2.08%
1952	5,069	53.62%	4,213	44.56%	172	1.82%
1956	5,299	54.92%	4,266	44.22%	83	0.86%
1960	5,374	53.80%	4,566	45.71%	49	0.49%
1964	3,671	37.81%	5,949	61.28%	88	0.91%
1968	4,410	45.32%	3,725	38.28%	1,596	16.40%
1972	5,910	59.77%	3,927	39.71%	51	0.52%
1976	4,911	45.90%	5,685	53.14%	103	0.96%
1980	6,287	54.23%	4,865	41.96%	442	3.81%
1984	7,255	60.61%	4,634	38.72%	80	0.67%
1988	6,702	57.47%	4,933	42.30%	26	0.22%
1992	5,403	39.52%	5,768	42.19%	2,500	18.29%
1996	6,073	43.74%	5,900	42.49%	1,912	13.77%
2000	8,711	58.48%	5,870	39.41%	315	2.11%
2004	11,015	63.63%	6,171	35.65%	124	0.72%
2008	10,551	58.06%	7,288	40.10%	335	1.84%
2012	10,640	60.21%	6,607	37.39%	424	2.40%
2016	12,943	69.74%	4,783	25.77%	832	4.48%
2020	14,565	71.98%	5,343	26.40%	328	1.62%
2024	14,830	72.53%	5,233	25.59%	385	1.88%

== Demographics ==
Historical population
Census	Pop.	Note	%±
1810	3,595		—
1820	7,875		119.1%
1830	10,273		30.5%
1840	12,459		21.3%
1850	15,286		22.7%
1860	18,521		21.2%
1870	19,913		7.5%
1880	21,326		7.1%
1890	20,786		−2.5%
1900	21,702		4.4%
1910	20,232		−6.8%
1920	18,656		−7.8%
1930	17,254		−7.5%
1940	17,106		−0.9%
1950	17,858		4.4%
1960	19,207		7.6%
1970	20,423		6.3%
1980	27,276		33.6%
1990	29,890		9.6%
2000	34,325		14.8%
2010	39,364		14.7%
2020	39,654		0.7%
2025 (est.)	40,437	▲	2.0%

=== Racial and ethnic composition ===
Harrison County, Indiana – Racial and ethnic composition Note: the US Census treats Hispanic/Latino as an ethnic category. This table excludes Latinos from the racial categories and assigns them to a separate category. Hispanics/Latinos may be of any race.
Race / Ethnicity (NH = Non-Hispanic)	Pop 1980	Pop 1990	Pop 2000	Pop 2010	Pop 2020	% 1980	% 1990	% 2000	% 2010	% 2020
White alone (NH)	26,967	29,547	33,518	37,984	36,702	98.87%	98.85%	97.65%	96.49%	92.56%
Black or African American alone (NH)	145	123	123	167	185	0.53%	0.41%	0.36%	0.42%	0.47%
Native American or Alaska Native alone (NH)	21	58	93	84	92	0.08%	0.19%	0.27%	0.21%	0.23%
Asian alone (NH)	32	34	70	153	189	0.12%	0.11%	0.20%	0.39%	0.48%
Native Hawaiian or Pacific Islander alone (NH)	x	x	4	9	17	x	x	0.01%	0.02%	0.04%
Other race alone (NH)	4	2	5	29	107	0.01%	0.01%	0.01%	0.07%	0.27%
Mixed race or Multiracial (NH)	x	x	181	357	1,434	x	x	0.53%	0.91%	3.62%
Hispanic or Latino (any race)	107	126	331	581	928	0.39%	0.42%	0.96%	1.48%	2.34%
Total	27,276	29,890	34,325	39,364	39,654	100.00%	100.00%	100.00%	100.00%	100.00%

=== 2020 census ===
As of the 2020 census, the county had a population of 39,654. The median age was 42.2 years. 22.8% of residents were under the age of 18 and 18.5% of residents were 65 years of age or older. For every 100 females there were 100.2 males, and for every 100 females age 18 and over there were 98.1 males age 18 and over.

The racial makeup of the county was 93.2% White, 0.5% Black or African American, 0.3% American Indian and Alaska Native, 0.5% Asian, <0.1% Native Hawaiian and Pacific Islander, 1.1% from some other race, and 4.4% from two or more races. Hispanic or Latino residents of any race comprised 2.3% of the population.

14.4% of residents lived in urban areas, while 85.6% lived in rural areas.

There were 15,541 households in the county, of which 30.8% had children under the age of 18 living in them. Of all households, 55.1% were married-couple households, 17.1% were households with a male householder and no spouse or partner present, and 20.9% were households with a female householder and no spouse or partner present. About 24.8% of all households were made up of individuals and 11.4% had someone living alone who was 65 years of age or older.

There were 16,686 housing units, of which 6.9% were vacant. Among occupied housing units, 81.2% were owner-occupied and 18.8% were renter-occupied. The homeowner vacancy rate was 1.4% and the rental vacancy rate was 5.8%.

=== 2010 census ===
As of the 2010 United States census, there were 39,364 people, 15,192 households, and 11,031 families in the county. The population density was 81.2 inhabitants per square mile (31.4/km^{2}). There were 16,534 housing units at an average density of 34.1 per square mile (13.2/km^{2}). The racial makeup of the county was 97.4% white, 0.5% black or African American, 0.4% Asian, 0.2% American Indian, 0.5% from other races, and 1.0% from two or more races. Those of Hispanic or Latino origin made up 1.5% of the population. In terms of ancestry, 31.1% were German, 16.5% were American, 12.8% were Irish, and 12.8% were English.

Of the 15,192 households, 33.7% had children under the age of 18 living with them, 58.5% were married couples living together, 9.5% had a female householder with no husband present, 27.4% were non-families, and 22.8% of all households were made up of individuals. The average household size was 2.56 and the average family size was 2.99. The median age was 40.2 years.

The median income for a household in the county was $47,697 and the median income for a family was $59,316. Males had a median income of $40,884 versus $31,808 for females. The per capita income for the county was $23,539. About 7.8% of families and 10.0% of the population were below the poverty line, including 15.7% of those under age 18 and 5.1% of those age 65 or over.

== Economy ==
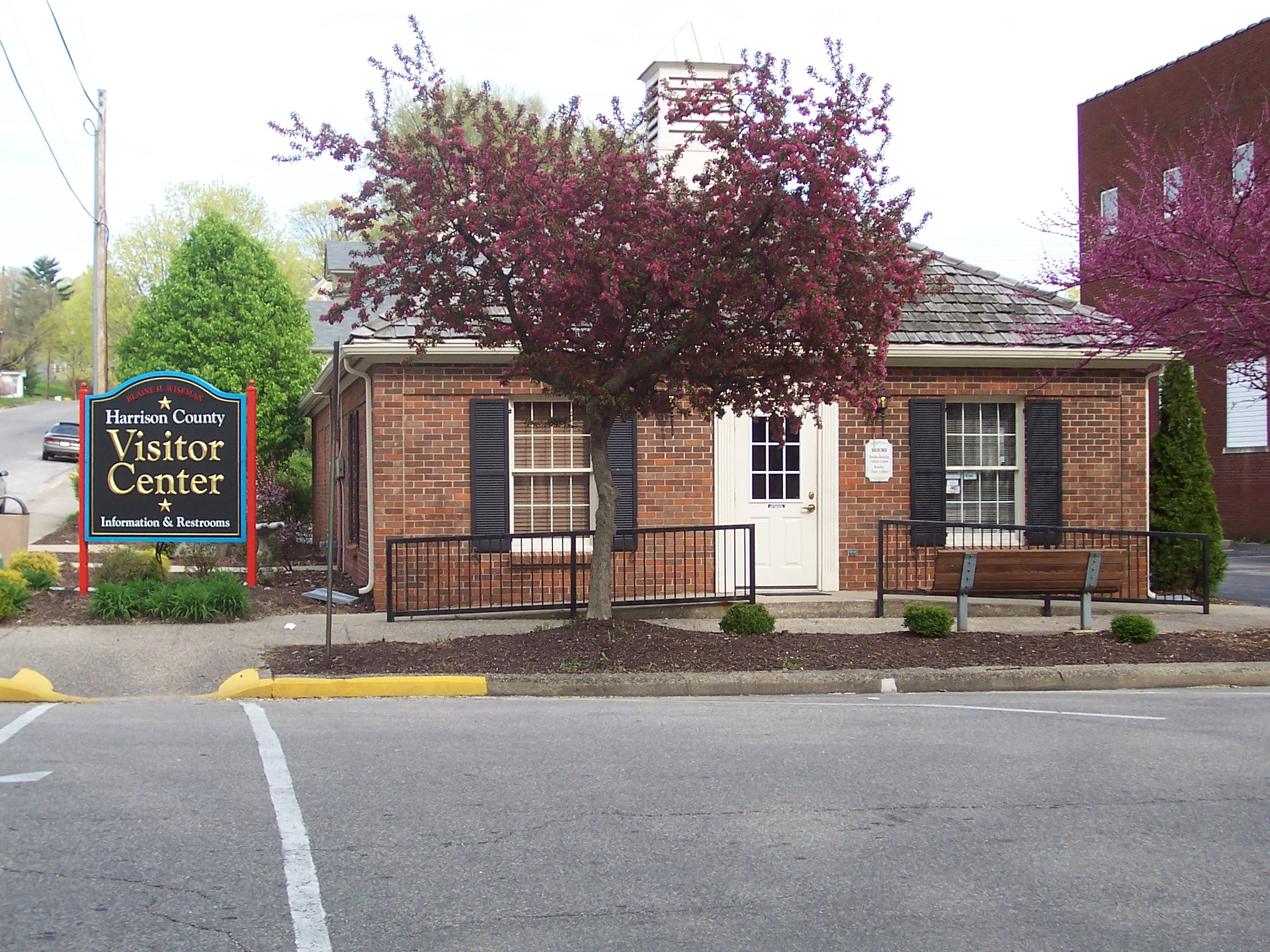
Harrison County Visitors Center

Harrison County has a diverse economy. Manufacturing industry is centered in the Corydon Industrial Park where automobile-related manufacturing is most prevalent. There is large–scale farming throughout the rural areas of the county; corn and soybeans are the county's largest crops. A service and shopping district is centered in Corydon. There are several medical facilities in the county including the Harrison County Hospital, two nursing facilities operated by Kindred Healthcare, and a number of private practices.

The county has a developed tourism industry. The main attractions are the historic sites of Corydon, the county's golf courses, the Horseshoe Riverboat Casino and Hotel, and the area's two famous caves: Squire Boone Caverns near Mauckport and Wyandotte Caves in adjoining Crawford County. The casino is the county's single largest source of tax revenue and produced $23.5 million in tax revenue during 2007.

Multiple utility companies serve the county. Electricity is provided by the Harrison Rural Electric Membership Cooperative (REMC) and Duke Energy. Natural gas is provided by the Indiana Utilities Corporation in Corydon and several small distributors provide rural service. Land-line telephone service is provided exclusively by Verizon. Cable television is provided by Insight Communications in some parts of the county. Water is pumped from a number of corporations, the largest being South Harrison Water Corporation and Ramsey Water Inc.

As of July 2009, the county's largest employer was the Horseshoe Southern Indiana casino with 1,600 employees. Other large employers: Harrison County Hospital employs 504, South Harrison Community School Corporation employs 425, Blue River Services employs 405, Wal-Mart employs 400, North Harrison Community School Corporation employs 311, ICON Metal Forming employs 200, Darmic Inc. employs 120, Kindred Healthcare employs 115, Smith Store Fixtures and Lucas Oil Products each employs 80, Norstam Veneers employs 50, and Speed Flex employs 41. An additional 92 businesses employ 5 to 40 workers. 13% of the workforce is in retail, 12% in government, 12% in manufacturing, 11% in services, 8% in accommodations and food services, 8% in agriculture, 7% in construction, 7% working for local utilities, 6% in finance, insurance, and real estate, and 6% in other trades. The Louisville, Jefferson County, KY-IN Metropolitan statistical area to which Harrison County belongs had an unemployment rate of 10.2% in December 2009.

== Transportation ==
=== Transit ===
- Southern Indiana Transit System

=== Highways ===
- Interstate 64 runs east–west through Harrison County, connecting Corydon and Lanesville.
- US Route 150 crosses the northern part of the county following the route of the Buffalo Trace.
- State Road 135 runs north–south through the county.
- State Road 62 runs east–west through the county, crossing State Road 135 at Corydon.
- State Road 64 runs east–west across northern Harrison County. It crosses State Road 135 in New Salisbury.
- State Road 111 connects Elizabeth with New Albany in neighboring Floyd County; the Horseshoe Riverboat Casino is located on the route.
- State Road 337 runs northwest–southeast across the county, passing through Corydon.
- State Road 211 runs for about 2 miles (3.2 km) east of Elizabeth in the southeast part of county, connecting State Roads 11 and 111.
- State Road 462 connects the Harrison-Crawford State Forest with State Road 62 in the southwest part of the county, running for about 3 miles (4.8 km).

=== Railroads ===
- Lucas Oil Rail Line – a 7-mile (11 km) shortline railroad from Corydon northward through the industrial park where Lucas Oil's bottling facilities are located, to its intersection with east–west Norfolk Southern Railway line near New Salisbury.
- Norfolk Southern line – crosses northern Harrison County, through Crandall, Ramsey, and Depauw. It has a small depot in Ramsey.

=== Airport ===
There is one airport in Harrison County, a general-aviation (gravel east–west strip) port one mile (1.6 km) NNW of Elizabeth: Robinson Airpark.

== Education ==
The county has 22 schools; 15 are public schools in 3 school districts, and 7 are private. South Harrison Community Schools is the largest district with 3,141 pupils in 2010. The district covers the southern half of the county and includes Corydon Central High School, Corydon Central Junior High School, South Central Junior & Senior High School, Corydon Intermediate, Corydon Elementary, Heth-Washington Elementary, and New Middletown Elementary. North Harrison Community School Corporation had 2,324 pupils in 2010 enrolled in North Harrison High School, North Harrison Middle School, North Harrison Elementary, and Morgan Elementary. Lanesville Community School Corporation is the smallest district serving only Franklin Township. It consists of Lanesville Junior Senior High School and Lanesville Elementary. In 2010, teachers in the North Harrison district averaged $50,800 in annual salary; South Harrison teachers averaged $48,500; Lanesville teachers averaged $51,500. North Harrison had a 2010 graduation rate of 81.5%; South Harrison 84.6%; Lanesville 91.5%. Lanesville and North Harrison students performed above average on 2010 statewide ISTEP+ tests, while South Harrison students performed below average.

The county has several private schools supported by local churches. St. John's, a Lutheran school near Lanesville, has 77 pupils. St. Joseph's, a Catholic school in Corydon, has 87 pupils. County high school students, including those in public, private, and home schools, may attend the vocational school C. A. Prosser school of Technology in neighboring Floyd County as part of their high school curriculum.

The 2017 Lanesville Eagles’ baseball program captured the school's first state title in any sport and the first state crown in Harrison County history by way of a 5–1 win over Rossville in the Class 1A final at Victory Field in Indianapolis.

The county is served by the Harrison County Public Library system. All county residents have free access.

== Notable people ==
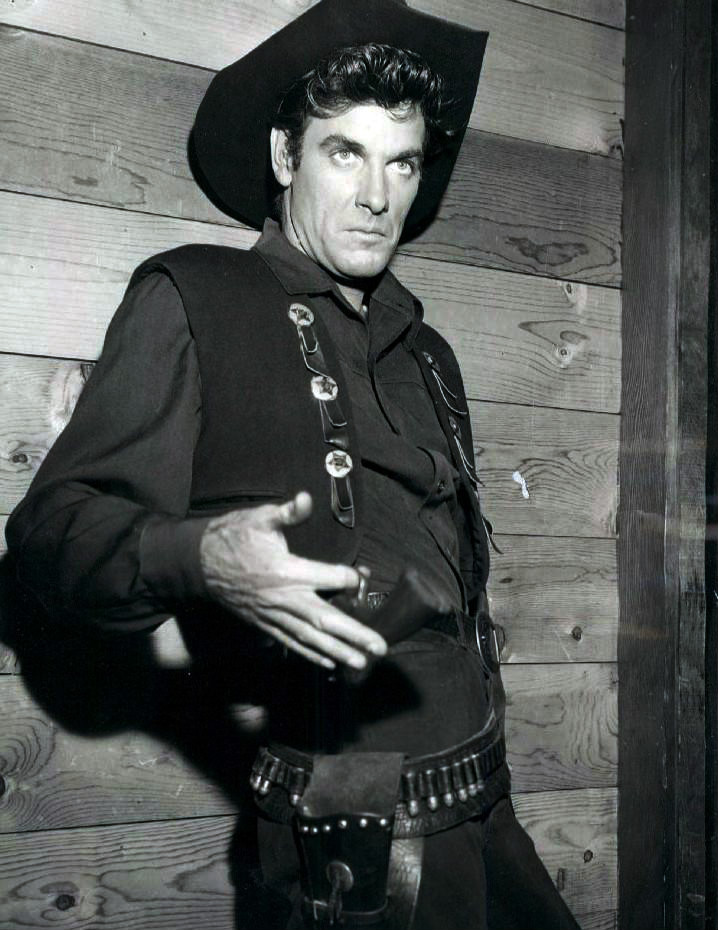
James Best

William Taylor Zenor – born in 1846 near Corydon. Practiced law in Corydon and Leavenworth. Judge, third judicial circuit (1885–1897). Indiana representative in US House of Representatives (1897–1907). Buried in Corydon.

James Best – born in 1926 in Kentucky; at the age of three he went to an orphanage, then was adopted and was raised in Corydon. After his Army service he became a movie and television actor. Best known as Sheriff Rosco P. Coltrane on The Dukes of Hazzard.

Arville Funk – born in Harrison County in 1929 and attended school in Corydon. He taught high school history for 10 years starting in 1955. Practiced law in Corydon. He was active with Indiana historical and genealogical societies, and wrote about Indiana history. He is buried in Corydon.

Frank O'Bannon – born in 1930 in Corydon. After an Air Force stint he was state senator, lieutenant governor, and then governor (1997–2003). Buried in Corydon.

== See also ==
- National Register of Historic Places listings in Harrison County, Indiana
