= Lanesville Jr/Sr High School =

Location
- 2725 Crestview Avenue Northeast; Lanesville, Harrison County, Indiana 47112; United States; 38.239417°N 85.988889°W

Information
- Type: Public high school
- Established: 1939
- School district: Lanesville Community School Corporation
- Principal: Aric Miller
- Teaching staff: 18.50 (FTE)
- Grades: 7–12
- Enrollment: 393 (2025-2026)
- Student to teacher ratio: 16.92
- Color
- Athletics conference: Southern
- Team name: Eagles
- Website: lhs.lanesville.k12.in.us

Lanesville Jr/Sr High School is a public school in Lanesville, Indiana, United States.

== About ==
Lanesville Jr/Sr High School serves grades 7–12 and is part of the Lanesville Community School Corporation. It is attended by students from Lanesville and surrounding Franklin Township. The school is adjacent to Lanesville Elementary School in the Little Indian Creek valley.

The school is staffed by 20 teachers with an average salary of $52,070. There were 340 students enrolled during the 2009–2010 school year.

== Athletics ==
Lanesville's athletic teams are known as the Eagles, and the school colors are purple and white.

The 2017 baseball team, led by Harvey, Bube, and Peele, won the state 1A championship.

The 2019 baseball team, led by Fink, Lockman, Bailey, and Gowens, won the 2A sectional championship.

The 2023 women's basketball team won the state 1A championship.

The 2024 women's basketball team won the state 1A championship. This championship was the second for the Lady Eagles, both coming in back-to-back years, and the third overall IHSAA State Championship for the Lanesville Eagles athletic department.

Lanesville's athletics is directed by Zach Payne, who has achieved many accomplishments. Prior to accepting the athletic director role at Lanesville, Payne had led the Eagles baseball program to 3 sectional championships (2016, 2017, and 2019), 2 regional championships, 2 regional championships, 2 semi-state championships, 1 IHSAA State runner-up, and 1 IHSAA State Baseball championship. Along with his highly successful tenure as head coach of Lanesville, Payne also had success leading Providence High School's baseball team, located in Clarksville, Indiana. Payne won the 2017 Indiana Coach of the Year award.

== See also ==
- List of high schools in Indiana
