= Franklin Township, Harrison County, Indiana =

Franklin Township
- Township
- Location in Harrison County
- Coordinates: 38°14′23″N 86°00′20″W
- Country: United States
- State: Indiana
- County: Harrison

Government
  - Type: Indiana township

Area
  - Total: 34.91 sq mi (90.4 km^{2})
  - Land: 34.89 sq mi (90.4 km^{2})
  - Water: 0.02 sq mi (0.052 km^{2}) 0.06%
- Elevation: 830 ft (253 m)

Population (2020)
  - Total: 4,161
  - Density: 119.3/sq mi (46.05/km^{2})
- GNIS feature ID: 0453303

Franklin Township is one of twelve townships in Harrison County, Indiana, United States. As of the 2020 census, its population was 4,161 and it contained 1,728 housing units.

Historical population
| Census | Pop. | Note | %± |
|---|---|---|---|
| 1890 | 1,602 | | — |
| 1900 | 1,599 | | −0.2% |
| 1910 | 1,467 | | −8.3% |
| 1920 | 1,458 | | −0.6% |
| 1930 | 1,347 | | −7.6% |
| 1940 | 1,309 | | −2.8% |
| 1950 | 1,439 | | 9.9% |
| 1960 | 1,736 | | 20.6% |
| 1970 | 1,952 | | 12.4% |
| 1980 | 2,872 | | 47.1% |
| 1990 | 3,087 | | 7.5% |
| 2000 | 3,642 | | 18.0% |
| 2010 | 4,104 | | 12.7% |
| 2020 | 4,161 | | 1.4% |
Source: US Decennial Census

== Geography ==
According to the 2010 census, the township has a total area of 34.91 square miles (90.4 km^{2}), of which 34.89 square miles (90.4 km^{2}) (or 99.94%) is land and 0.02 square miles (0.052 km^{2}) (or 0.06%) is water. The streams of Lazy Creek, Little Indian Creek, Smith Creek and Woertz Creek run through this township.

=== Cities and towns ===
- Lanesville

=== Unincorporated towns ===
- Utan

(This list is based on USGS data and may include former settlements.)

=== Adjacent townships ===
- Georgetown Township, Floyd County (northeast)
- Franklin Township, Floyd County (east)
- Posey Township (southeast)
- Webster Township (southwest)
- Harrison Township (west)
- Jackson Township (northwest)

=== Cemeteries ===
The township contains one cemetery, Lanesville.

=== Major highways ===
- Interstate 64
- Indiana State Road 62
- Indiana State Road 64

=== Airports and landing strips ===
- Greenridge KLA Airport
- Lanesville Skyways Airport
