= Moberly, Indiana =

Unincorporated community in Indiana, United States

Coordinates: 38°16′11″N 86°12′34″W

Moberly is an unincorporated community in Spencer Township, Harrison County, Indiana, in the United States.

== History ==
Moberly was first settled in about 1850.
