= Rosewood, Indiana =

Unincorporated community in Indiana, United States

Coordinates: 38.03813°N 85.92913°W

Rosewood is an unincorporated community in Harrison County, Indiana, in the United States.

== History ==
A post office was established at Rosewood in 1854, and remained in operation until it was discontinued in 1905.
