= Harvey Heth =

American politician

Harvey Heth (1770–1816) was born on April 28, 1770, in Virginia. He was the son of Agnes McMahon Heth and Captain Henry Heth, an Irish immigrant to the Thirteen Colonies who later served in the American Revolutionary War. He was also the brother of several other Revolutionary War veterans, including Henry Heth.

== Biography ==
Harvey moved to Indiana Territory in the late 18th century and was one of the first settlers in Harrison County, Indiana. He later purchased a large tract of land from William Henry Harrison. The land included much of present-day Heth Township and the south eastern corner of Corydon. He built a mill on Buck Creek, one of the first in the state.

Harvey was among the first elected to the Indiana Territory Legislative Council in 1809 when Congress forced the dissolution of the existing legislature and permitted the state to begin electing their own representatives. It was his only participation in the legislature.

Harvey surveyed much of the county for the Territorial Legislature including the new capital of Corydon. Heth was part of the commission to select the new capital in 1810. He favored Corydon which was near his home and donated a portion of land he owned for the town.

Heth was a close friend of Squire Boone. He helped to create Boone's original burial tomb and was going to be buried with Boone. Heth's family objected though and instead buried on the west side of Buck Creek.

Heth died in 1816 and is buried in the western part of Heth Township.
