= New Middletown, Indiana =

- Town
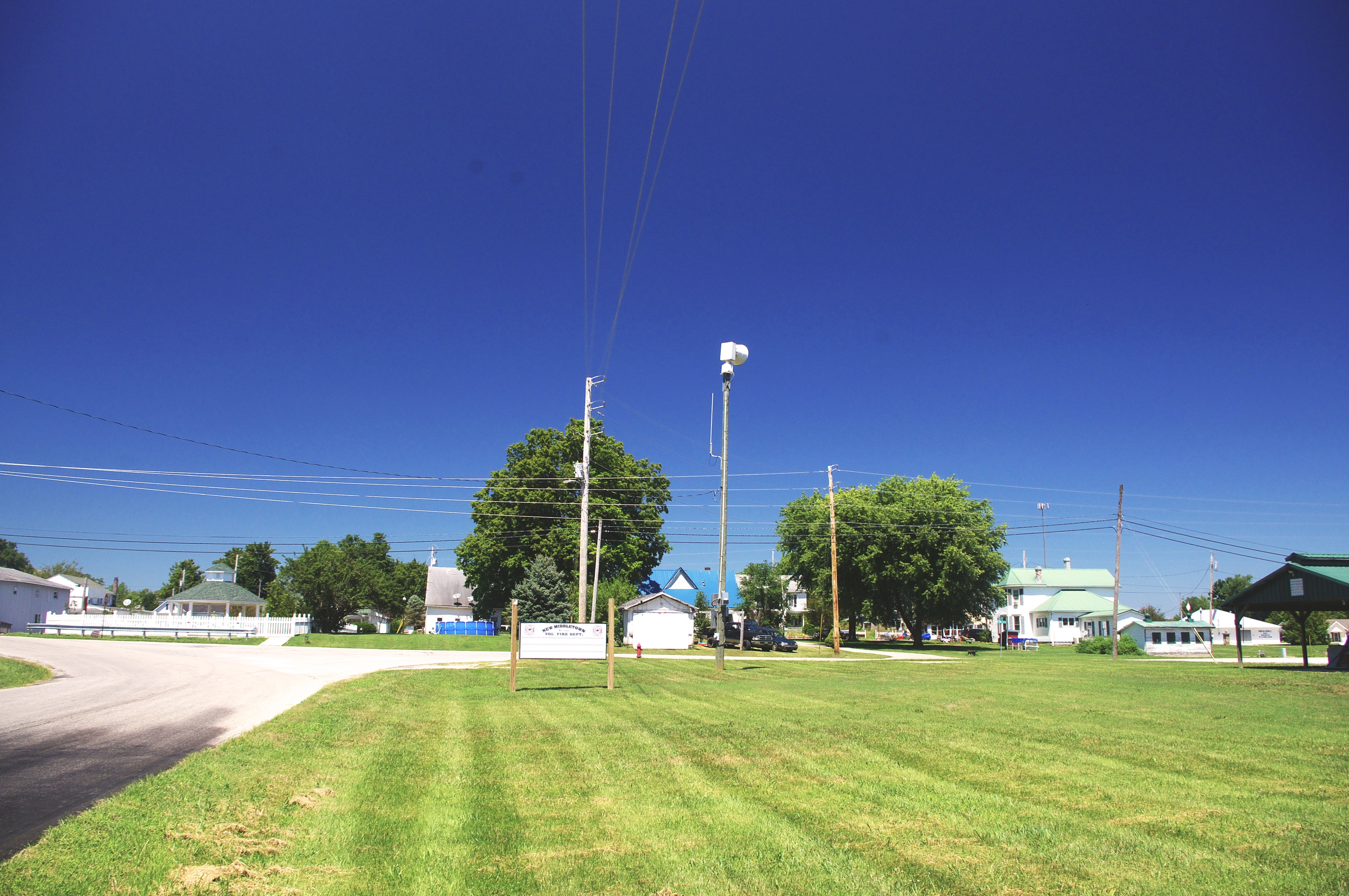
- New Middletown

- Location of New Middletown in Harrison County, Indiana.
- Coordinates: 38°9′49″N 86°3′2″W
- Country: United States
- State: Indiana
- County: Harrison
- Township: Webster

Area
  - Total: 0.035 sq mi (0.09 km^{2})
  - Land: 0.035 sq mi (0.09 km^{2})
  - Water: 0 sq mi (0.00 km^{2})
- Elevation: 699 ft (213 m)

Population (2020)
  - Total: 90
  - Density: 2,578.7/sq mi (995.64/km^{2})
- Time zone: UTC-5 (Eastern (EST))
  - Summer (DST): UTC-4 (EDT)
- ZIP code: 47160
- Area code: 812
- FIPS code: 18-53298
- GNIS feature ID: 0440086

New Middletown is a town in Webster Township, Harrison County, Indiana, United States. As of the 2020 census, New Middletown had a population of 90.

== History ==
New Middletown was laid out in 1860.

== Geography ==
New Middletown is located at 38°9′49″N 86°3′2″W (38.163481, -86.050667). The town is situated in a hilly area of central Harrison County, southeast of Corydon and northwest of Elizabeth.

According to the 2010 census, New Middletown has a total area of 0.04 square miles (0.10 km^{2}), all land.

== Demographics ==
Historical population
Census	Pop.	Note	%±
1880	171		—
1890	212		24.0%
1900	167		−21.2%
1910	145		−13.2%
1920	119		−17.9%
1930	118		−0.8%
1940	115		−2.5%
1950	153		33.0%
1960	132		−13.7%
1970	133		0.8%
1980	115		−13.5%
1990	82		−28.7%
2000	77		−6.1%
2010	93		20.8%
2020	90		−3.2%
U.S. Decennial Census

=== 2010 census ===
As of the census of 2010, there were 93 people, 32 households, and 24 families living in the town. The population density was 2,325.0 inhabitants per square mile (897.7/km^{2}). There were 39 housing units at an average density of 975.0 per square mile (376.4/km^{2}). The racial makeup of the town was 95.7% White, 2.2% African American, and 2.2% from two or more races.

There were 32 households, of which 46.9% had children under the age of 18 living with them, 46.9% were married couples living together, 12.5% had a female householder with no husband present, 15.6% had a male householder with no wife present, and 25.0% were non-families. 25.0% of all households were made up of individuals. The average household size was 2.91 and the average family size was 3.17.

The median age in the town was 29.5 years. 29% of residents were under the age of 18; 15.2% were between the ages of 18 and 24; 17.2% were from 25 to 44; 31.3% were from 45 to 64; and 7.5% were 65 years of age or older. The gender makeup of the town was 54.8% male and 45.2% female.

=== 2000 census ===
As of the census of 2000, there were 77 people, 30 households, and 18 families living in the town. The population density was 1,833.9 inhabitants per square mile (708.1/km^{2}). There were 35 housing units at an average density of 833.6 per square mile (321.9/km^{2}). The racial makeup of the town was 96.10% White. Hispanic or Latino of any race were 3.90% of the population.

There were 30 households, out of which 30.0% had children under the age of 18 living with them, 53.3% were married couples living together, 3.3% had a female householder with no husband present, and 36.7% were non-families. 23.3% of all households were made up of individuals, and 10.0% had someone living alone who was 65 years of age or older. The average household size was 2.57 and the average family size was 3.05.

In the town, the population was spread out, with 22.1% under the age of 18, 11.7% from 18 to 24, 33.8% from 25 to 44, 23.4% from 45 to 64, and 9.1% who were 65 years of age or older. The median age was 37 years. For every 100 females, there were 102.6 males. For every 100 females age 18 and over, there were 100.0 males.

The median income for a household in the town was $45,000, and the median income for a family was $45,833. Males had a median income of $33,750 versus $17,500 for females. The per capita income for the town was $33,423. There were no families and 6.3% of the population living below the poverty line, including no under eighteens and 100.0% of those over 64.
