= Bradford, Indiana =

Unincorporated community in Indiana, United States

- Unincorporated community
- Location in Harrison County
- Coordinates: 38°22′04″N 86°03′43″W
- Country: United States
- State: Indiana
- County: Harrison County
- Elevation: 840 ft (260 m)
- ZIP code: 47164
- GNIS feature ID: 0431435

Bradford is an unincorporated community in Morgan Township, Harrison County, Indiana.

== History ==
Bradford was platted in 1838. The Bradford post office was established in 1844.
