= Dogwood, Indiana =

Unincorporated community in Indiana, United States

- Unincorporated community
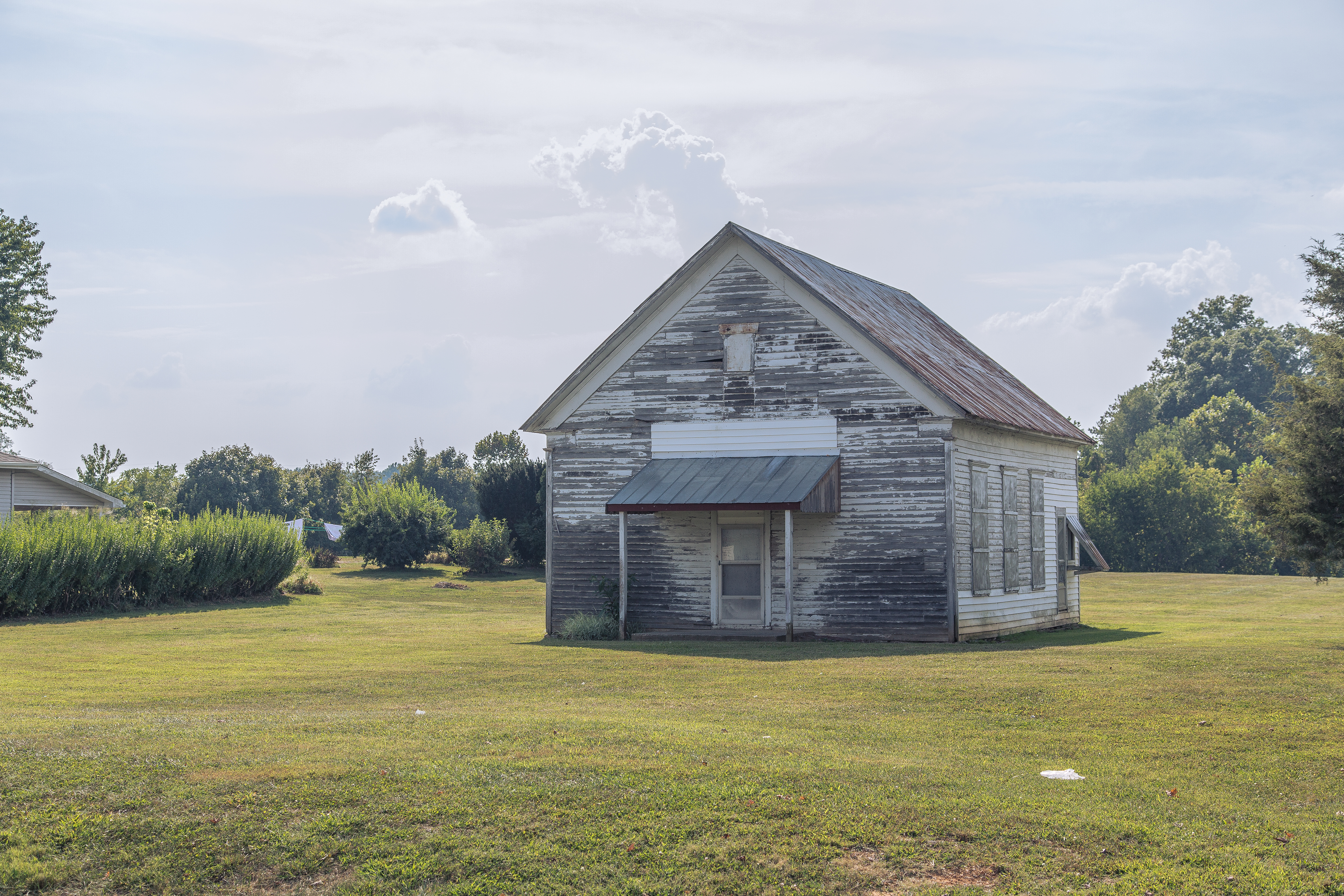
- Old schoolhouse near Dogwood

- Harrison County's location in Indiana

- Dogwood's location in Harrison County
- Coordinates: 38°06′19″N 86°05′04″W
- Country: United States
- State: Indiana
- County: Harrison
- Township: Webster
- Elevation: 666 ft (203 m)
- Time zone: UTC-5 (EST)
  - Summer (DST): UTC-4 (EDT)
- ZIP code: 47135
- FIPS code: 18-18316
- GNIS feature ID: 433609

Dogwood is an unincorporated community in Webster Township, Harrison County, Indiana.

== History ==
A post office was established at Dogwood in 1890, and remained in operation until it was discontinued in 1922. The community was likely named after the dogwood tree.
