= Central Barren, Indiana =

Unincorporated community in Indiana, United States

- Unincorporated community
- Harrison County's location in Indiana

- Location in Harrison County
- Coordinates: 38°21′51″N 86°05′47″W
- Country: United States
- State: Indiana
- County: Harrison
- Township: Morgan
- Elevation: 791 ft (241 m)
- ZIP code: 47161
- FIPS code: 18-11872
- GNIS feature ID: 432350

Central Barren is an unincorporated community in Morgan Township, Harrison County, Indiana.

== History ==
The Harrison County barrens were so named by the early settlers for the lack of timber coverage. They were large tracts of prairie-like land, with only grass and small bushes. For the first decades of settlement, no one would live on the barrens because they were considered too far from the timber needed to build homes, fires, fences, and other necessities. The barrens were also swept by annual field fires, which would burn off most of the growth. As settlement expanded and farming grew in the early nineteenth century, settlers began to discover that because of the fires, the barrens were among the most fertile farmlands in the state, and they quickly filled with landholders. As settlement increased, the settlers were able to stop and prevent the wild fires that hindered forest growth and by the start of the 20th century, much of the barrens that were uninhabited began to grow up in Forrest, as it has remained until modern times.

A post office was established at Central Barren in 1890, and remained in operation until it was discontinued in 1905.
