= Hogtown, Indiana =

Hogtown
- Unincorporated community
- Location within Crawford County, Indiana
- Coordinates: 38°21′30″N 86°19′04″W
- Country: United States
- State: Indiana
- County: Crawford
- Township: Whiskey Run
- Elevation: 574 ft (175 m)
- ZIP code: 47140
- FIPS code: 18-34240
- GNIS feature ID: 436299

Hogtown is an unincorporated community in Whiskey Run Township, Crawford County, Indiana.
