= Fairdale, Indiana =

Unincorporated community in Indiana, United States

Coordinates: 38.32618°N 86.17109°W

Fairdale is an unincorporated community in Harrison County, Indiana, in the United States.

== History ==
Fairdale was founded in 1867.
