= Morgan Township, Harrison County, Indiana =

Morgan Township
- Township
- Coordinates: 38°22′11″N 86°05′13″W
- Country: United States
- State: Indiana
- County: Harrison

Government
  - Type: Indiana township

Area
  - Total: 35.78 sq mi (92.7 km^{2})
  - Land: 35.72 sq mi (92.5 km^{2})
  - Water: 0.06 sq mi (0.16 km^{2})
- Elevation: 817 ft (249 m)

Population (2020)
  - Total: 3,994
  - Density: 111.8/sq mi (43.17/km^{2})
- FIPS code: 18-51030
- GNIS feature ID: 453653

Morgan Township is one of twelve townships in Harrison County, Indiana. As of the 2020 census, its population was 3,994 and it contained 1,713 housing units.

Historical population
Census	Pop.	Note	%±
1890	1,333		—
1900	1,397		4.8%
1910	1,386		−0.8%
1920	1,271		−8.3%
1930	1,257		−1.1%
1940	1,456		15.8%
1950	1,636		12.4%
1960	1,789		9.4%
1970	1,958		9.4%
1980	2,965		51.4%
1990	3,250		9.6%
2000	3,819		17.5%
2010	4,153		8.7%
2020	3,994		−3.8%
Source: US Decennial Census

== Geography ==
According to the 2010 census, the township has a total area of 35.78 square miles (92.7 km^{2}), of which 35.72 square miles (92.5 km^{2}) (or 99.83%) is land and 0.06 square miles (0.16 km^{2}) (or 0.17%) is water.

=== Cities and towns ===
- Palmyra

=== Unincorporated towns ===
- Bradford
- Central Barren
- Sennville

(This list is based on USGS data and may include former settlements.)
