= White Cloud, Indiana =

Unincorporated community in Indiana, United States

- Unincorporated community
- Harrison County's location in Indiana

- White Cloud's location in Harrison County
- Coordinates: 38°13′41″N 86°13′28″W
- Country: United States
- State: Indiana
- County: Harrison
- Township: Harrison
- Elevation: 433 ft (132 m)
- ZIP code: 47112
- FIPS code: 18-83780
- GNIS feature ID: 449745

White Cloud is an unincorporated community in Harrison Township, Harrison County, Indiana.

== History ==
White Cloud was named for the frequent fog in the area. A post office was established at White Cloud in 1884, and remained in operation until it was discontinued in 1934.
