= Wynnsboro, Indiana =

Extinct town in Indiana, United States

Coordinates: 38°17′13″N 86°15′23″W

Wynnsboro is a ghost town in Harrison County, Indiana, in the United States.

== History ==
Wynnsboro was laid out in 1820 by John R. Wynn, and named for him. There's no post office left in Wynnsboro.
