= Palmyra, Indiana =

- Town
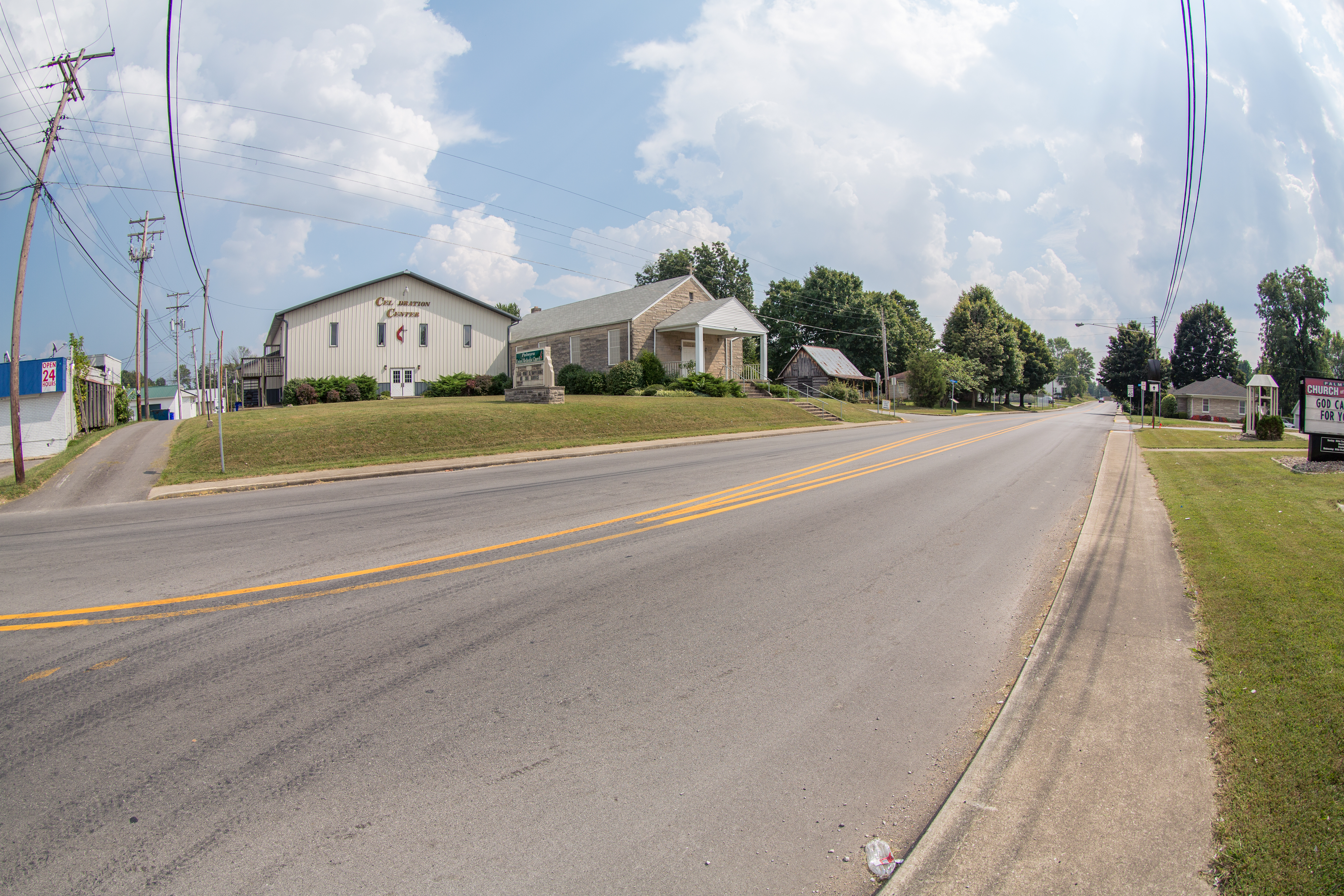

- Location of Palmyra in Harrison County, Indiana.
- Coordinates: 38°24′28.53″N 86°6′35.77″W
- Country: United States
- State: Indiana
- County: Harrison
- Township: Morgan
- Founded: 1836
- Incorporated: 1906

Area
  - Total: 1.24 sq mi (3.21 km^{2})
  - Land: 1.20 sq mi (3.10 km^{2})
  - Water: 0.042 sq mi (0.11 km^{2})
- Elevation: 774 ft (236 m)

Population (2020)
  - Total: 898
  - Density: 750/sq mi (290/km^{2})
- Time zone: UTC-5 (Eastern (EST))
  - Summer (DST): UTC-4 (EDT)
- ZIP code: 47164
- Area code: 812
- FIPS code: 18-57726
- GNIS feature ID: 0440849
- Website: www.townofpalmyra.com

Palmyra is a town in Morgan Township, Harrison County, Indiana, United States. As of the 2020 census, Palmyra had a population of 898.

== History ==
Palmyra was originally called Carthage, and under the latter name was laid out in 1836. Because there was already another Carthage in Indiana, the town was renamed Palmyra in 1839 to avoid repetition. The present name most likely is a transfer from the ancient city of Palmyra.

A Confederate force led by Brigadier General John Hunt Morgan camped in Palmyra on the night of July 9, 1863, after the Battle of Corydon. The army took ransoms from the businesses and commandeered all the town's horses for the Confederate cavalry. The army left the town on the morning of July 10, riding north towards Salem. The town had two previous names: McClellan's Crossroad and Carthage.

Palmyra was incorporated in 1906.

== Geography ==
Palmyra is located at 38°24′27″N 86°6′38″W (38.407458, -86.110636).

According to the 2010 census, Palmyra has a total area of 1.28 square miles (3.32 km^{2}), of which 1.24 square miles (3.21 km^{2}) (or 96.88%) is land and 0.04 square miles (0.10 km^{2}) (or 3.13%) is water.

== Government ==
Palmrya has a three-member Town Council and a Clerk Treasurer.

== Demographics ==
Historical population
Census	Pop.	Note	%±
1910	252		—
1920	227		−9.9%
1930	288		26.9%
1940	274		−4.9%
1950	327		19.3%
1960	470		43.7%
1970	483		2.8%
1980	692		43.3%
1990	621		−10.3%
2000	633		1.9%
2010	930		46.9%
2020	898		−3.4%
U.S. Decennial Census

=== 2010 census ===
As of the census of 2010, there were 930 people, 388 households, and 261 families residing in the town. The population density was 750.0 inhabitants per square mile (289.6/km^{2}). There were 423 housing units at an average density of 341.1 per square mile (131.7/km^{2}). The racial makeup of the town was 96.1% White, 0.1% African American, 0.2% Native American, 1.6% Asian, and 1.9% from two or more races. Hispanic or Latino of any race were 1.0% of the population.

There were 388 households, of which 35.6% had children under the age of 18 living with them, 48.7% were married couples living together, 12.6% had a female householder with no husband present, 5.9% had a male householder with no wife present, and 32.7% were non-families. 28.1% of all households were made up of individuals, and 11.4% had someone living alone who was 65 years of age or older. The average household size was 2.40 and the average family size was 2.90.

The median age in the town was 37.4 years. 24.2% of residents were under the age of 18; 9.4% were between the ages of 18 and 24; 27.2% were from 25 to 44; 24.7% were from 45 to 64; and 14.4% were 65 years of age or older. The gender makeup of the town was 48.0% male and 52.0% female.

=== 2000 census ===
As of the census of 2000, there were 633 people, 238 households, and 169 families residing in the town. The population density was 682.5 inhabitants per square mile (263.5/km^{2}). There were 253 housing units at an average density of 272.8 per square mile (105.3/km^{2}). The racial makeup of the town was 98.42% White, 0.16% Asian, and 1.42% from two or more races.

There were 238 households, out of which 36.1% had children under the age of 18 living with them, 59.2% were married couples living together, 8.8% had a female householder with no husband present, and 28.6% were non-families. 23.1% of all households were made up of individuals, and 10.5% had someone living alone who was 65 years of age or older. The average household size was 2.63 and the average family size was 3.12.

In the town, the population was spread out, with 26.9% under the age of 18, 8.4% from 18 to 24, 31.6% from 25 to 44, 19.3% from 45 to 64, and 13.9% who were 65 years of age or older. The median age was 35 years. For every 100 females, there were 95.4 males. For every 100 females age 18 and over, there were 96.2 males.

The median income for a household in the town was $36,964, and the median income for a family was $42,083. Males had a median income of $30,000 versus $22,321 for females. The per capita income for the town was $15,114. About 4.7% of families and 7.8% of the population were below the poverty line, including 4.5% of those under age 18 and 6.7% of those age 65 or over.

== Education ==
Palmyra has a public library, a branch of the Harrison County Public Library. The public school district serving the area is the North Harrison Community Schools Corporation. Residents feed into Morgan Elementary school, North Harrison Middle School, and North Harrison High School. Morgan Elementary is located just south of the town and houses grades Kindergarten through 5th grades; North Harrison Middle and High are located in nearby Ramsey.
