= Heth Township, Harrison County, Indiana =

Heth Township
- Township
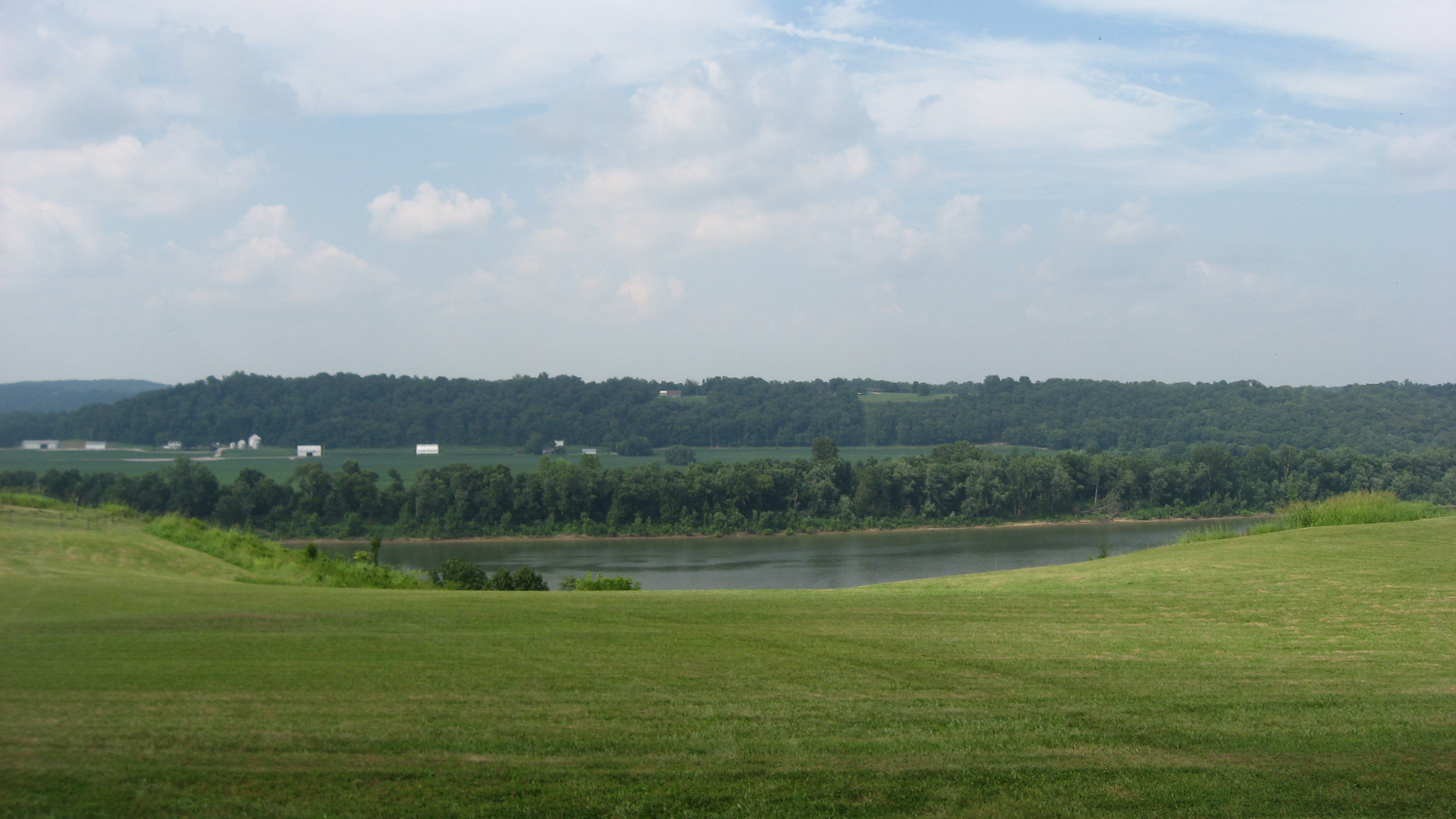
- The township's Ohio River shoreline, seen from Kentucky

- Coordinates: 38°03′39″N 86°10′57″W
- Country: United States
- State: Indiana
- County: Harrison

Government
  - Type: Indiana township

Area
  - Total: 34.35 sq mi (89.0 km^{2})
  - Land: 33.62 sq mi (87.1 km^{2})
  - Water: 0.73 sq mi (1.9 km^{2})
- Elevation: 633 ft (193 m)

Population (2020)
  - Total: 1,172
  - Density: 34.86/sq mi (13.46/km^{2})
- FIPS code: 18-33268
- GNIS feature ID: 453409

Heth Township is one of twelve townships in Harrison County, Indiana, United States. As of the 2020 census, its population was 1,172 and it contained 542 housing units.

Historical population
Census	Pop.	Note	%±
1890	1,775		—
1900	1,795		1.1%
1910	1,611		−10.3%
1920	1,452		−9.9%
1930	1,213		−16.5%
1940	1,055		−13.0%
1950	932		−11.7%
1960	843		−9.5%
1970	726		−13.9%
1980	880		21.2%
1990	961		9.2%
2000	1,199		24.8%
2010	1,278		6.6%
2020	1,172		−8.3%
Source: US Decennial Census

== History ==
The township was named for Harvey Heth, who surveyed much of Southern Indiana. He is buried in the western part of the township and was a major landholder in the area during the early 19th century.

It contains Squire Boone Caverns and Historic Village where Squire Boone, the brother of Daniel Boone, is buried. In the early 19th century, the township was also home to Isiah and James Boone.

== Geography ==
According to the 2010 census, the township has a total area of 34.35 square miles (89.0 km^{2}), of which 33.62 square miles (87.1 km^{2}) (or 97.87%) is land and 0.73 square miles (1.9 km^{2}) (or 2.13%) is water. The township includes the incorporated town of Mauckport, as well as the unincorporated town of Central. The township is bordered to the south by the Ohio River and Kentucky. It contains the only bridge over the Ohio River in Harrison County.

Mail is delivered from a post office in Mauckport; the township's ZIP codes are 47142 and 47143.

The township is part of the South Harrison School District and its children attend Heth-Washington Elementary, which is also attended by Washington Township children. Middle and high-school age children attend Corydon Central High School in Corydon.
