= Mauckport, Indiana =

- Town
- Location of Mauckport in Harrison County, Indiana.
- Coordinates: 38°1′25″N 86°12′7″W
- Country: United States
- State: Indiana
- County: Harrison
- Township: Heth

Area
  - Total: 0.21 sq mi (0.55 km^{2})
  - Land: 0.20 sq mi (0.52 km^{2})
  - Water: 0.012 sq mi (0.03 km^{2})
- Elevation: 427 ft (130 m)

Population (2020)
  - Total: 46
  - Density: 229.8/sq mi (88.73/km^{2})
- Time zone: UTC-5 (Eastern (EST))
  - Summer (DST): UTC-4 (EDT)
- ZIP code: 47142
- Area code: 812
- FIPS code: 18-47628
- GNIS feature ID: 0438737

Mauckport is a town in Heth Township, Harrison County, Indiana, United States, along the Ohio River. As of the 2020 census, Mauckport had a population of 46.

== History ==
In the earliest times Daniel Boone and his brothers, most notably Squire Boone, were regularly in the area of Mauckport. Squire Boone settled in the area in 1806. Squire Boone's remains are just north of Mauckport in the Squire Boone Caverns.

The Mauckport area's earliest permanent settlers came from the Shenandoah Valley and Lancaster County, Pennsylvania. The town was named after the Maucks, a German immigrant family who first settled in that area. The town itself is built upon land granted to John Peter Mauck in an 1811 land grant. It was his son, Fredrick, who filed the original plat for the town on May 7, 1827; the town was called Mauck's Port. The original town had three streets running north to south and four streets running east to west. The original town was divided into 107 lots.

The first road from the state capital to the Ohio River, the region's central means of transportation, was built in 1809 connecting the river at Mauckport with Corydon.

It was John Peter Mauck who started the state's first ferry, a raft and tow line crossing from Mauckport to Brandenburg, Kentucky on the opposite side of the river. It was operating at least as early as 1808. In the early days of the state it was considered the best means of entering the region by immigrants. In the earliest days, packetboats hauled timber and farm products from the port to other stops along the river. Very early after the development of the steam ship, the town had a wharf and was a frequent stop for steam ships and river barges, as it being the closest river port to the original state capital of Corydon.

In 1847, the citizens of the town filed a petition to change the name of Mauckport to New Market. The petition was granted and it remained New Market until 1850, when it was changed back to Mauckport because of another New Market post office in Indiana. The town was first incorporated in 1853.

Mauckport was the site of a small skirmish in July 1863 during "Morgan's Raid" in the American Civil War. Mauckport was where Morgan and his men, aided by the citizens of neighboring Brandenburg, Kentucky, crossed the Ohio River to start his raid in earnest. When he first attempted to cross, he was confronted by a small group of men from the Harrison County Legion, firing artillery from the shore and armed men aboard the riverboat Lady Pike. When Morgan returned fire with his own artillery the home guard quickly retreated back toward Corydon, leaving Mauckport undefended. Upon landing his army on the east side of Mauckport, Morgan burnt the steam boat Alice Dean. The citizens of Mauckport, having plenty of forewarning, abandoned the town and fled to the west until Morgan's army passed.

In 1900, the Ohio River froze solid during the winter, destroying the town's ships. In 1905 the river froze again, this time destroying the town's wharf. This began the decline of the town, whose importance had been declining since the war.

The first car arrived in Mauckport in 1913, a "Maxwell" car, owned by Daniel Baker Beanblossom.

During the Ohio River flood of 1937, Mauckport was decimated. The largest part of the town was destroyed, leading to the majority of the population abandoning it. The Mauckport High School was discontinued in 1950 and in 1957, its use as an elementary school was also discontinued. The building was razed in 1958. Other factors contributing to the decline of the town's population included the rise of the railroad, which led to less reliance on the river for transportation.

According to the US census, the population of Mauckport peaked in 1900 with a population of 290. It then decreased to 209 by 1930, and then declined following the 1937 flood to 154 in the 1940 census.

Today, Mauckport is the site of the Matthew E. Welsh Bridge, built in 1966, the only bridge crossing the Ohio River between New Albany, Indiana and Tell City, Indiana. Formerly a toll bridge, it is of through truss design and provides a link between Harrison County, Indiana and Meade County, Kentucky. Frederick Mauck is buried in an unmarked grave near the same bridge.

The oldest house in Mauckport was built in 1850 by James H. Miller and is located on Back Street.

The town still celebrates "Mauckport Days" every spring with a parade, and weekend of activities, bazaar style booths, and competitions. It is attended by most of the townships residents and many from neighboring Washington and Posey Townships.

== Geography ==
Mauckport is located at 38°1′25″N 86°12′7″W (38.023486, -86.202038). According to the 2010 census, Mauckport has a total area of 0.2 square miles (0.52 km^{2}), of which 0.19 square miles (0.49 km^{2}) (or 95%) is land and 0.01 square miles (0.03 km^{2}) (or 5%) is water.

== Demographics ==
Historical population
Census	Pop.	Note	%±
1880	278		—
1890	272		−2.2%
1900	290		6.6%
1910	279		−3.8%
1920	239		−14.3%
1930	203		−15.1%
1940	154		−24.1%
1950	154		0.0%
1960	107		−30.5%
1970	119		11.2%
1980	109		−8.4%
1990	95		−12.8%
2000	83		−12.6%
2010	81		−2.4%
2020	46		−43.2%
U.S. Decennial Census

=== 2010 census ===
As of the census of 2010, there were 81 people, 36 households, and 15 families residing in the town. The population density was 426.3 inhabitants per square mile (164.6/km^{2}). There were 44 housing units at an average density of 231.6 per square mile (89.4/km^{2}). The racial makeup of the town was 100.0% White.

There were 36 households, of which 36.1% had children under the age of 18 living with them, 16.7% were married couples living together, 25.0% had a female householder with no husband present, and 58.3% were non-families. 47.2% of all households were made up of individuals, and 25% had someone living alone who was 65 years of age or older. The average household size was 2.25 and the average family size was 3.20.

The median age in the town was 34.2 years. 32.1% of residents were under the age of 18; 7.3% were between the ages of 18 and 24; 24.6% were from 25 to 44; 19.7% were from 45 to 64; and 16% were 65 years of age or older. The gender makeup of the town was 50.6% male and 49.4% female.

=== 2000 census ===
As of the census of 2000, there were 83 people, 40 households, and 22 families residing in the town. The population density was 610.8 inhabitants per square mile (235.8/km^{2}). There were 44 housing units at an average density of 323.8 per square mile (125.0/km^{2}). The racial makeup of the town was 96.39% White, 2.41% from other races, and 1.20% from two or more races. Hispanic or Latino of any race were 2.41% of the population.

There were 40 households, out of which 15.0% had children under the age of 18 living with them, 40.0% were married couples living together, 10.0% had a female householder with no husband present, and 45.0% were non-families. 32.5% of all households were made up of individuals, and 5.0% had someone living alone who was 65 years of age or older. The average household size was 2.08 and the average family size was 2.59.

In the town, the population was spread out, with 16.9% under the age of 18, 6.0% from 18 to 24, 28.9% from 25 to 44, 42.2% from 45 to 64, and 6.0% who were 65 years of age or older. The median age was 43 years. For every 100 females, there were 102.4 males. For every 100 females age 18 and over, there were 115.6 males.

The median income for a household in the town was $36,964, and the median income for a family was $36,250. Males had a median income of $25,000 versus $20,313 for females. The per capita income for the town was $15,946. There were 20.0% of families and 18.0% of the population living below the poverty line, including 12.5% of under eighteens and none of those over 64.

== Notable people ==
- Strother M. Stockslager

== See also ==
- List of cities and towns along the Ohio River
- Ohio River flood of 1937
