= Webster Township, Harrison County, Indiana =

Webster Township
- Township
- Coordinates: 38°08′36″N 86°03′19″W
- Country: United States
- State: Indiana
- County: Harrison

Government
  - Type: Indiana township

Area
  - Total: 30.21 sq mi (78.2 km^{2})
  - Land: 30.21 sq mi (78.2 km^{2})
  - Water: 0 sq mi (0 km^{2})
- Elevation: 669 ft (204 m)

Population (2020)
  - Total: 1,703
  - Density: 56.37/sq mi (21.77/km^{2})
- FIPS code: 18-82106
- GNIS feature ID: 454044

Webster Township is one of twelve townships in Harrison County, Indiana. As of the 2020 census, the population was 1,703.

== Geography ==
According to the 2021 census, the township has a total area of 30.21 square miles (78.2 km^{2}), all land with 46.6 people per square mile. It is located in Indiana in the United States of America.

== Demographics ==
As of the 2021 census, its population was 1,408 and it contained 512 housing units. The unified school district is South Harrison, with 49% of the population attaining a high school graduate degree and 17.9% receiving a bachelor's degree. Within the town, there are an estimated 92.0% White, 4.0% Black, 0% Native, 4% Asian, 0% Pacific Islander, 0% Two or more races, 0% Hispanic or Latino, and 0% Other. The median household income averages $57,326 with $39, 422 per capita income. An estimated 3.9% of the population live below the poverty line, with children under 18 encompassing 9% of it.

Historical population
Census	Pop.	Note	%±
1890	1,251		—
1900	1,279		2.2%
1910	1,178		−7.9%
1920	1,072		−9.0%
1930	981		−8.5%
1940	997		1.6%
1950	998		0.1%
1960	1,123		12.5%
1970	1,232		9.7%
1980	1,493		21.2%
1990	1,490		−0.2%
2000	1,616		8.5%
2010	1,781		10.2%
2020	1,703		−4.4%
Source: US Decennial Census
