= Jackson Township, Harrison County, Indiana =

Jackson Township
- Township
- Coordinates: 38°17′55″N 86°05′35″W
- Country: United States
- State: Indiana
- County: Harrison

Government
  - Type: Indiana township

Area
  - Total: 36.16 sq mi (93.7 km^{2})
  - Land: 36.16 sq mi (93.7 km^{2})
  - Water: 0 sq mi (0 km^{2})
- Elevation: 720 ft (220 m)

Population (2020)
  - Total: 5,990
  - Density: 166/sq mi (64.0/km^{2})
- FIPS code: 18-37080
- GNIS feature ID: 453448

Jackson Township is one of twelve townships in Harrison County, Indiana. As of the 2020 census, its population was 5,990 and it contained 2,409 housing units. It contains the census-designated place of New Salisbury.

Historical population
Census	Pop.	Note	%±
1890	1,527		—
1900	1,714		12.2%
1910	1,637		−4.5%
1920	1,478		−9.7%
1930	1,352		−8.5%
1940	1,497		10.7%
1950	1,673		11.8%
1960	2,010		20.1%
1970	2,331		16.0%
1980	3,977		70.6%
1990	4,627		16.3%
2000	5,213		12.7%
2010	6,042		15.9%
2020	5,990		−0.9%
Source: US Decennial Census

== Geography ==
According to the 2010 census, the township has a total area of 36.16 square miles (93.7 km^{2}), all of which is land.
