= Spencer Township, Harrison County, Indiana =

Spencer Township
- Township
- Coordinates: 38°17′18″N 86°13′47″W
- Country: United States
- State: Indiana
- County: Harrison

Government
  - Type: Indiana township

Area
  - Total: 38.33 sq mi (99.3 km^{2})
  - Land: 38.33 sq mi (99.3 km^{2})
  - Water: 0 sq mi (0 km^{2})
- Elevation: 801 ft (244 m)

Population (2020)
  - Total: 1,770
  - Density: 46.2/sq mi (17.8/km^{2})
- FIPS code: 18-71936
- GNIS feature ID: 453860

Spencer Township is one of twelve townships in Harrison County, Indiana. As of the 2020 census, its population was 1,770 with 769 housing units.

Historical population
Census	Pop.	Note	%±
1890	1,272		—
1900	1,282		0.8%
1910	1,253		−2.3%
1920	1,184		−5.5%
1930	1,062		−10.3%
1940	1,053		−0.8%
1950	1,053		0.0%
1960	1,025		−2.7%
1970	1,033		0.8%
1980	1,625		57.3%
1990	1,687		3.8%
2000	1,694		0.4%
2010	1,855		9.5%
2020	1,770		−4.6%
Source: US Decennial Census

== Geography ==
According to the 2010 census, the township has a total area of 38.33 square miles (99.3 km^{2}), all land.
