= List of National Natural Landmarks in Indiana =

There are 30 National Natural Landmarks in Indiana.

Indiana National Natural Landmarks (clickable map)

Name	Image	Date	Location	County	Ownership	Description
Big Walnut Creek		1985	Bainbridge; 39.796749°N 86.777474°W	Putnam	State & private	Contains one of the few stands in Indiana where beech, sugar maple, and tulip poplar grow on alluvial Genesee soil.
Cabin Creek Raised Bog		1974	Farmland; 40.1368101°N 85.1257457°W	Randolph	Private	One of the few known inland raised bogs in the United States. It has a very rich flora including many species at or near their range limits.
Calvert and Porter Woods		1974	New Ross; 40.0228369°N 86.7218275°W	Montgomery	State	One of the finest near-virgin remnant forests in the Tipton Till Plain of central Indiana.
Cowles Bog	Cowles Bog	1965	Chesterton; 41.6375°N 87.092222°W	Porter	Federal	Part of the Indiana Dunes National Lakeshore, this is the sole remaining remnant of the Central Dunes where Henry Chandler Cowles performed his pioneering field studies of plant succession and species diversity.
Davis-Purdue Agriculture Center Forest		1974	Farmland; 40.2533425°N 85.1480344°W	Randolph	State	The best old growth oak-hickory forest on the Tipton Till Plain.
Donaldson Cave System and Woods		1972	Mitchell; 38.73022°N 86.4153307°W	Lawrence	State	Located in Spring Mill State Park. A stream flows from a cave through the bottom of a gorge.
Dunes Nature Preserve		1974	Porter; 41.660°N 87.040°W	Porter	State	A part of Indiana Dunes State Park. Inter-dunal wetlands and blowouts along Lake Michigan
Fern Cliff Nature Preserve		1980	Greencastle; 39.610985°N 86.96366°W	Putnam	Private	Contains exceptional occurrences of mosses and liverworts, including a noteworthy number of rare species.
Hanging Rock and Wabash Reef	Hanging Rock	1986	Lagro; 40.83°N 85.70722°W	Wabash	Private	Contains an impressive natural exposure of fossilized coral reef dating from the Silurian Period some 400 million years ago. The limestone reef deposit rises 75 feet (23 m) above the river and is being undercut by it, giving the site its "hanging" appearance.
Harrison Spring	Harrison Spring	1980	Depauw; 38.244755°N 86.225143°W	Harrison	Private	A portion of the water that feeds the spring originates from Indian Creek, and then goes underground until it reaches the spring area. It produces at least three million US gallons (11,000,000 L; 2,500,000 imp gal) of water a day at an average of 18,000 US gallons per minute (1,100 L/s), enough to supply water to an average town of 12,000
Hemmer Woods		1973	Oakland City; 38.230768°N 87.370935°W	Gibson	State & private	Original southwestern Indiana oak-hickory forest.
Hoosier Prairie	Hoosier Prairie	1974	Griffith; 41.522683°N 87.457572°W	Lake	Federal	Part of the Indiana Dunes National Lakeshore. Wetland prairie remnant of sand plains, sedge meadows, and marshes.
Hoot Woods		1973	Freedom; 39.249897°N 86.889462°W	Owen	Private	A relatively undisturbed, isolated beech-maple forest in which near climax conditions prevails.
Kramer Woods		1973	Reo; 37.843932°N 87.137981°W	Spencer	State	The only example of a Shumard's red oak-pin oak-hickory dominated stand of lowland mixed forest of any size in Indiana.
Marengo Cave		1984	Marengo; 38.37555°N 86.33993°W	Crawford	Private	One of only four show caves in Indiana, public tours of the cave have been given since 1883. Tours commenced just days after the cave's discovery by two school children.
Meltzer Woods		1973	Shelbyville; 39.5028°N 85.6678°W	Shelby	Private	Contains two contrasting forest types and exceptionally large individuals of several tree species.
Officer's Woods		1974	Seven miles northwest of Madison	Jefferson	Private	One of the finest remnants of beech-maple forest south of the Wisconsin-age glacial boundary in Indiana. Contains two stands which differ slightly in composition, one of which contains an exceptionally high density of black gum.
Ohio Coral Reef	Fossil beds, Ohio Coral Reef	1966	Clarksville; 38.27665°N 85.76544°W	Floyd	Federal	A classic example of a Silurian and Devonian coral community. Extends into Kentucky. Part of Falls of the Ohio National Wildlife Conservation Area.
Pine Hills Natural Area	Honeycomb Rock, Pine Hills Nature Preserve	1968	Waveland; 39.94276°N 87.049348°W	Montgomery	State	A unit of Shades State Park. Deep gorges, the result of the last glacial meltwaters.
Pinhook Bog	Pinhook Bog	1965	Michigan City; 41.615°N 86.848333°W	LaPorte	Federal	Part of Indiana Dunes National Lakeshore. A bog formed from a postglacial kettle moraine left behind about 14,000 years before the present by the melting of the ice sheet during the end of the Wisconsin glaciation. The acidic bog is noted for pitcher plants and other wetland species.
Pioneer Mothers Memorial Forest		1974	Paoli; 38.536°N 86.459°W	Orange	Federal	One of the best examples of an original, undisturbed presettlement forest in Indiana. Part of Hoosier National Forest.
Portland Arch Nature Preserve		1973	Covington; 40.218611°N 87.335833°W	Fountain	State	The preserve encompasses the wooded valleys, ravines, and rocky cliffs around the lowest section of Bear Creek. The name comes from a natural sandstone bridge carved by a small tributary of Bear Creek.
Rise at Orangeville		1972	West Baden Springs; 38.63115°N 86.55711°W	Orange	Private	Orangeville Rise of Lost River Nature Preserve is the second-largest spring in the state of Indiana.
Rocky Hollow Falls Canyon Nature Preserve	Rocky Hollow Falls Canyon	1974	Marshall; 39.893739°N 87.204589°W	Parke	State	Rocky Hollow and Falls Canyon are two of a series of canyons cut into the sandstone of Turkey Run. Located in Turkey Run State Park.
Shrader-Weaver Woods	Shrader-Weaver Woods	1974	Bentonville; 39.720309°N 85.222321°W	Fayette	State	Old growth beech-maple forest with a pioneer homestead. Includes tulip, wild black cherry, and black walnut trees.
Tamarack Bog		1973	Mongo; 41.676361°N 85.262314°W	LaGrange	State	A large tamarack tree swamp located within the Pigeon River Fish and Wildlife Area.
Tolliver Swallowhole		1972	Orleans; 38.616197°N 86.494599°W	Orange	Private	An extraordinary example of the disappearing stream aspect of karst topography.
Wesley Chapel Gulf (Elrod Gulf)	Wesley Chapel Gulf	1972	Orleans; 38.622452°N 86.521906°W	Orange	Federal	Probably the largest sinkhole in Indiana. Located in Hoosier State Forest.
Wesselman Woods Nature Preserve	Wesselman Woods Nature Preserve	1973	Evansville; 37.984722°N 87.506111°W	Vanderburgh	Municipal	A southern old growth forest
Wyandotte Caves	Entrance to Wyandotte Cave	1972	Leavenworth; 38.228056°N 86.296111°W	Crawford	State	Straddles O'Bannon Woods State Park and Harrison-Crawford State Forest. Caves began to form in the Pliocene Era, about 2 million years ago. Like most of Southern Indiana's caves, the caves were formed when water dissolved limestone, causing hollow caves to form.

== See also ==
- List of National Historic Landmarks in Indiana
