= Orangeville, Indiana =

Orangeville, Indiana may refer to:

- Orangeville, DeKalb County, Indiana, an unincorporated community in Concord Township
- Orangeville, Orange County, Indiana, an unincorporated community in Orangeville Township

== See also ==
- Orangeville (disambiguation)
