= Orangeville Township =

Orangeville Township may refer to the following places in the United States:

- Orangeville Township, Orange County, Indiana
- Orangeville Township, Michigan

== See also ==
- Orangeville (disambiguation)
