= Indiana State Road 462 =

State highway in Indiana, United States

State Road 462
- SR 462 highlighted in red

Route information
- Maintained by INDOT
- Length: 2.946 mi (4.741 km)

Major junctions
- South end: O'Bannon Woods State Park
- North end: SR 62 in Harrison Township

Location
- Country: United States
- State: Indiana
- Counties: Harrison

Highway system
- Indiana State Highway System; Interstate; US; State; Scenic
← SR 458	→ I-465

State Road 462 is a short three-mile (4.8 km) spur route in southwestern Harrison County, Indiana.

== Route description ==
State Road 462 begins at State Road 62 and runs generally south through heavily wooded country. It crosses the Blue River just 0.02 miles (0.032 km) south of State Road 62 (which follows the line of the river here), and crosses Rock Creek after another 0.9 miles (1.4 km). It terminates at the O'Bannon Woods State Park and Cold Friday Road.

== Major intersections ==
The entire route is in Harrison Township, Harrison County.

mi	km	Destinations	Notes
0.000	0.000	SR 62 – Wyandotte Caves, Corydon	Northern terminus of SR 462
2.946	4.741	O'Bannon Woods State Park	Southern terminus of SR 462
1.000 mi = 1.609 km; 1.000 km = 0.621 mi
