= 468 (disambiguation) =

468 AD/CE is a year of the Julian calendar.

468 may also refer to:

- 468 (number)
- 468 BC, /BCE; a year (ISO year -467; Holocene calendar year 9533; 2417 BP)

== Places ==
- 468 Lina, a main-belt asteroid, the 468th asteroid registered
- Area code 468, a telephone area code for Quebec, Canada
- Route 468, see List of highways numbered 468
- Rural Municipality of Meota No. 468 (RM 468), Saskatchewan, Canada
- Chung Fu stop, Hong Kong, station code

== Military ==
=== Military units numbered 468 ===
- 468th (2/1st North Midland) Field Company, Royal Engineers, UK
- 468th Bombardment Group, a WWII U.S. Army Air Force unit
- 468th Strategic Fighter Squadron, a U.S. Air Force unit
- 468th Marine Brigade (South Vietnam)

=== Naval ships with pennant number 468 ===
- USS Taylor (DD-468), a U.S. Navy WWII Fletcher-class destroyer
- HMS Braithwaite (K468), a UK Royal Navy WWII Captain-class frigate
- USS LST-468, a U.S. Navy WWII landing ship
- German submarine U-468, a Nazi Germany WWII Type VIIC submarine

== Other uses ==
- Braille pattern dots-468
- 468 (New Jersey bus), a public bus route in New Jersey, United States
- London Buses route 468, a public bus route in London, England, UK

== See also ==
- United Nations Security Council Resolution 468 (1980)
- 46800 (disambiguation)
- 4680 (disambiguation)
