= Gmündertobelbrücke =

- Coordinates: 47°23′16″N 9°20′53″E

Characteristics
- No. of lanes: 1

History
- Construction start: March 1907
- Construction end: November 7, 1908

Location
- Interactive map of Gmündertobelbrücke

The Gmündertobelbrücke (literally "Gmündertobel Bridge") in the Swiss canton of Appenzell Ausserrhoden connects the Steinerstrasse (Route 463) between the towns of Stein and Teufen across the gorge of the Sitter river. It is located a few kilometers south of the city of St. Gallen, but is not part of the St. Gallen bridge trail because it is not located in the Canton of St. Gallen. The bridge is an important example of early concrete arch bridges and, when completed in 1908, was briefly the longest concrete arch bridge span in the world. It is classified by the Swiss government as a cultural property of national importance.

== Structure ==
The Gmündertobelbrücke spans the Sitter with a large concrete arch 79 m wide, featuring two round arches on the east side and four on the west side, each with a span of 10.25 m. The bridge deck, elevated above the arch, is about 70 m above the bed of the Sitter. Originally, the bridge had a 5.70 m wide lane and two 0.60 m wide sidewalks, for a total width of 6.90 m between the concrete parapets. During a renovation in 1960 and 1961, the road deck was renewed and extended to a total width of 10.50 m.

== History ==
A wooden crossing over the Sitter in the area of the present bridge was first mentioned in the 1530s. In 1710, a covered wooden bridge was built. After a flood in 1783, it was elevated; during this renovation, the roof trusses were raised so that riders no longer had to dismount. In 1856, it was replaced by the old Gmündertobelbrücke, a truss bridge made of wrought iron on high cast iron pillars, which spanned the gorge at about 55 m above sea level. By 1900, the bridge had fallen into disrepair, and since there was enough gravel and sand in the Sitter valley, it was decided to build a concrete bridge that would span about 100 m downstream from the old iron bridge, at a point where it almost perfectly coincided with the surrounding elevation.

The new bridge was designed by Emil Mörsch, then a professor at the Swiss Federal Institute of Technology Zurich, assisted by the cantonal engineer of Appenzell Ausserrhoden Andreas D. Sutter, who subsequently also assumed the construction management. Construction began in March 1907 and was completed on November 7, 1908, with the handover of the bridge to the canton. Construction costs were significantly higher than the bid price, partly due to the sharp rise in labor and material costs. This resulted in a loss of 25,000 francs for the construction company and its subsequent bankruptcy. The access roads were built with considerable delay, so the bridge was not opened to traffic until November 22, 1909.

Major renovations were carried out first in 1960 and 1961, along with the widening of the road deck, and then from 2011 to 2013, during which, among other things, the road deck was reinforced to meet current requirements.

== Technical details ==
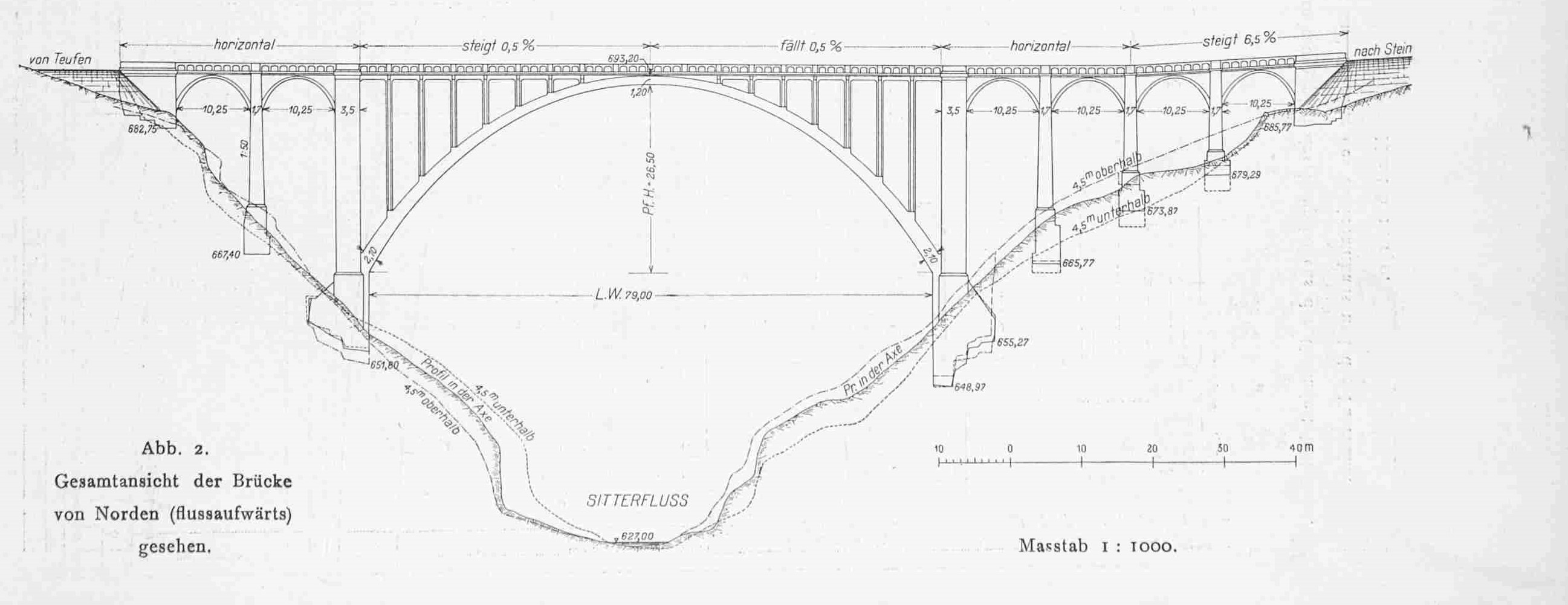
Design of the Gmündertobelbrücke

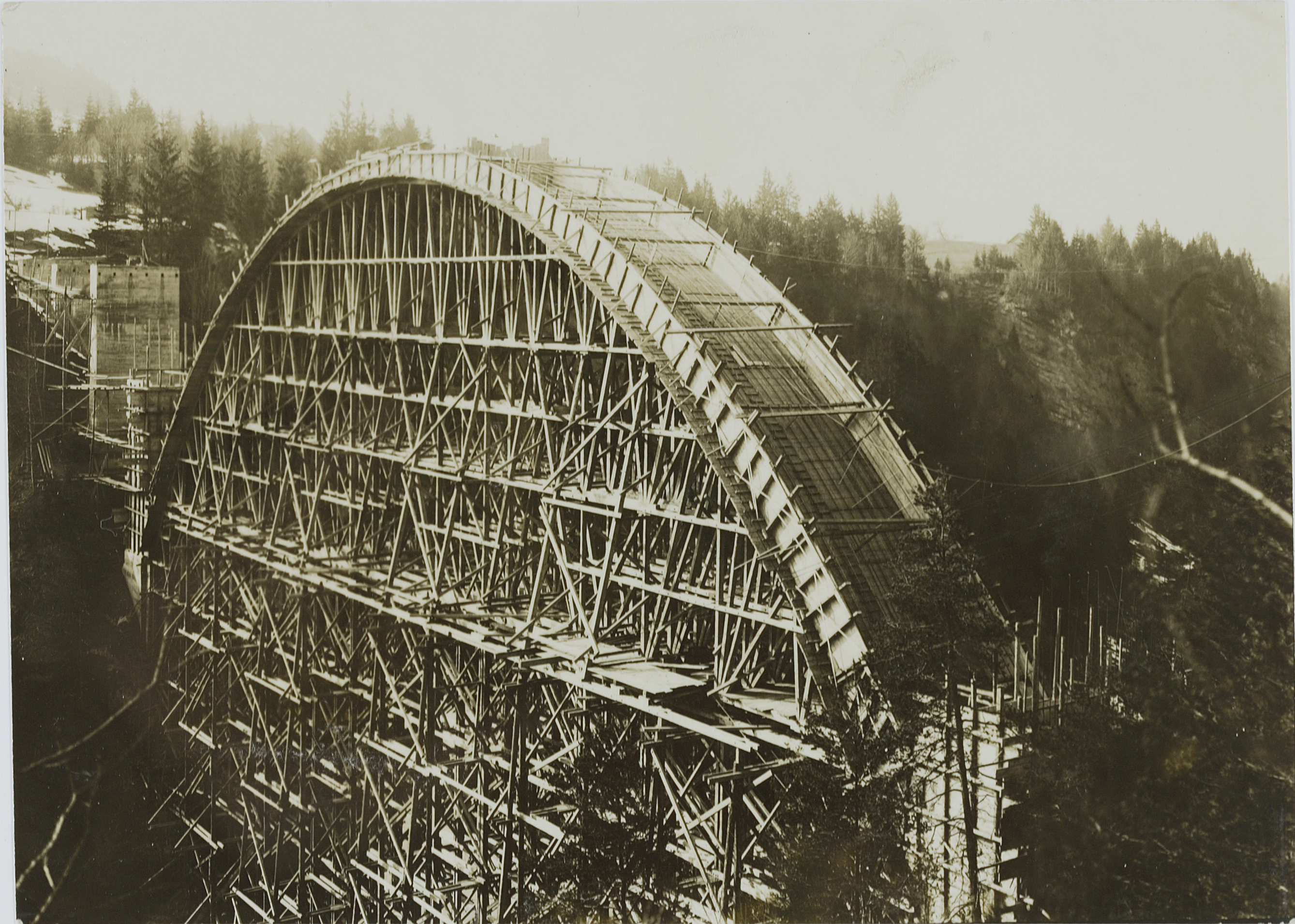
Gmündertobelbrücke under construction (1907/08)

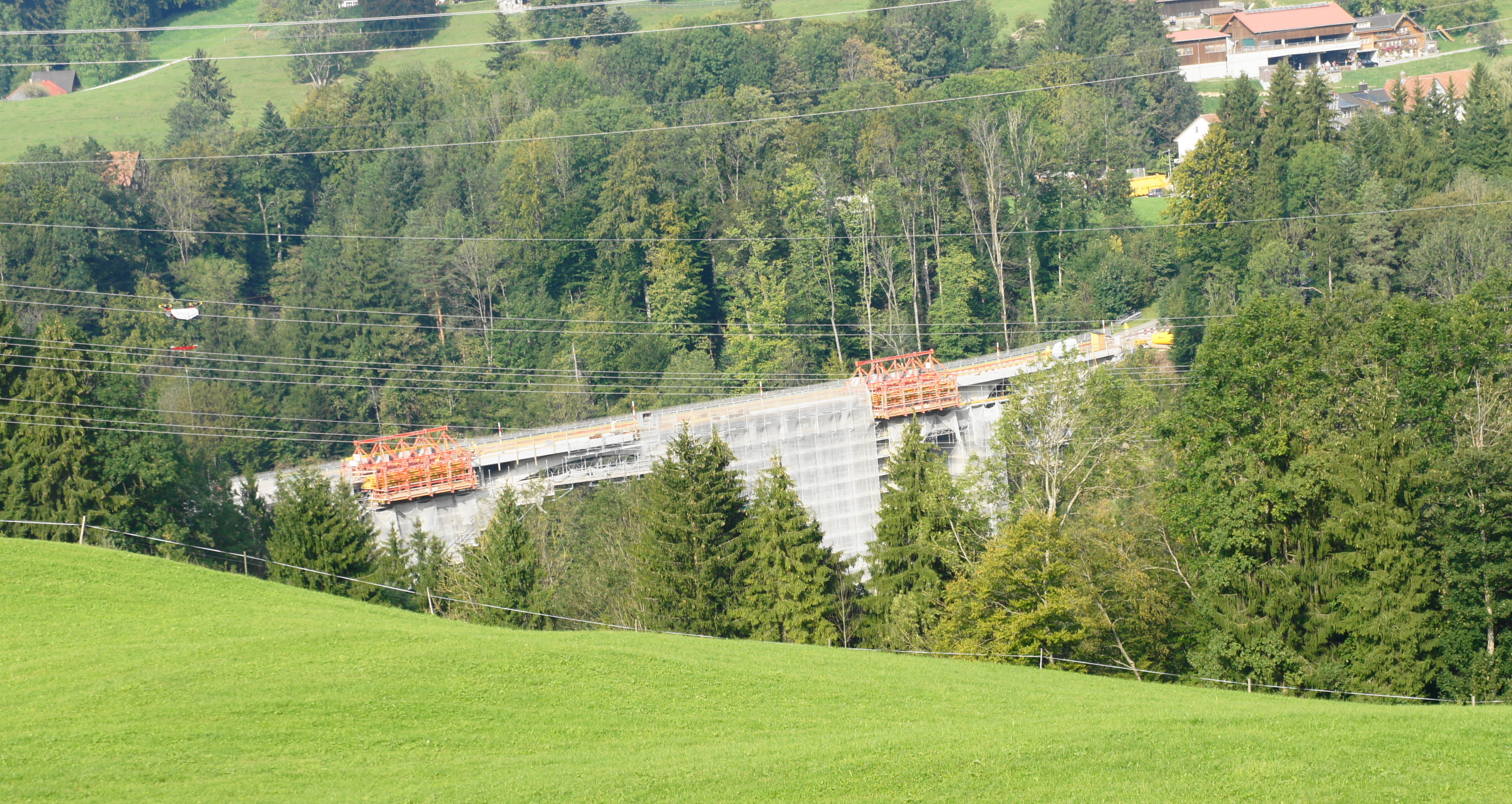
Renovation (2011)

In 1904, Emil Mörsch completed the Grünwalder bridge, with two three-hinged arches with spans of 70 m, at that time the largest concrete arches in the world. For the Gmündertobelbrücke, he designed a fixed elastic arch without joints of 79 m, significantly larger. Although the design had to be based on the 1906 Swiss standard for reinforced concrete with its still very cautious estimates of permissible stresses, Mörsch calculated these estimates according to his theory or method of elasticity, which he presented in an article published in 1906. Today, the Gmündertobelbrücke is considered an outstanding example of an integral concrete bridge, in which the structural components are connected to form monolithic structures characterized by integral load-bearing behavior, economic execution, and high aesthetics.

The arch has a rise of 26.5 m. Its width is 6.50 m at the apex and 7.50 m at the abutments. The thickness of the arch increases from 1.20 m at the apex to 2.13 m at the abutments. Theoretically, the arch did not need to be reinforced, but for safety reasons, an iron reinforcement was inserted into the upper and lower spandrels of the vault. The arch rests on deeply cemented abutments in the slopes about halfway up the gorge, which also form the foundations for the large piers on either side of the arch. There are 6 rows of four supports each on both halves of the arch, supporting the road deck, with the positions of the supports corresponding to the beams under the roadway. The inner supports have a square cross-section of 0.50 m × 0.50 m, while for architectural reasons, the outer piers have a T-shaped cross-section, giving them a wider viewing area of 0.80 cm. In addition, the outer supports follow the contour of the front surface of the large arch. All supports are firmly connected to both the arch and the road deck.

The road deck is divided into sections 49.3 m long on the openings on the western side, into sections 81.8 m above the main arch, and into sections 25.5 m above the two openings on the eastern side, connected to each other originally by sheet metal plates and today by expansion joints. The central section does not rest on the large piers. Instead, Mörsch had a 0.25 m thick reinforced concrete wall 12 m high inserted in the recesses of the upper area of the piers, firmly connected to the road deck. This reinforced concrete wall is sufficiently elastic to allow for the linear expansions of the 81.8 m road deck (1 cm was necessary on both sides, but up to 2 cm is possible). A space of 12 cm was provided between the wall and the pier for the formwork, but this was increased to 20 cm during construction to facilitate the work.

The roadway is slightly raised above the main arch towards the apex of the arch to give it a more pleasing appearance and to allow rainwater to drain more easily. The entire bridge was originally covered with a jute asphalt covering to protect it from water ingress. With the renovation of the road deck, the waterproofing was also renewed and the original concrete parapet was replaced with a steel railing.

For the construction of the bridge arch, Richard Coray erected falsework that rested on concrete foundations specially built on the valley floor and the side slopes. The process used 1.5 m^{3} of wood per 1 m^{3} of the concrete arch. However, in the end, it was possible to reuse the wooden beams for another viaduct over the Sitter.

Before the start of the concreting work, detailed tests were carried out to determine the best mixing ratios of sand and gravel. As with the Iller bridge in Kempten, it was demonstrated that certain types of unwashed sand, i.e. with the finest particles, gave greater compressive strength, and similarly when the stone dust produced during stone breaking was not washed. Fine unwashed quarry sand, washed coarse river sand and gravel, and unwashed limestone gravel with grain sizes from 1 to 25 mm were therefore used. For transporting gravel and sand from the riverbed, an aerial tramway was used, while the concrete was transported to the construction site by a cable crane.
