= List of highways numbered 461 =

The following highways are numbered 461:

== International ==
- European route E461

== Canada ==
- Newfoundland and Labrador Route 461

== Cuba ==
- Remedios–Placetas Road (4–461)

== Japan ==
- Japan National Route 461

== Spain ==
- Autovía A-461

== United States ==
- Iowa Highway 461
- Kentucky Route 461
- Maryland Route 461
- New Mexico Highway 461
- North Carolina Highway 461
- Puerto Rico Highway 461
- South Carolina Highway 461
- Tennessee State Route 461
- Texas State Highway Loop 461

Preceded by 460	Lists of highways 461	Succeeded by 462
