= Orangeville =

Orangeville may refer to:

== Places ==
Orangeville is the name of several places:

In Australia:

- Orangeville, New South Wales

In Canada:

- Orangeville, Ontario

In the United States:

- Orangeville, Illinois
- Orangeville, DeKalb County, Indiana, hamlet in DeKalb County
- Orangeville, Orange County, Indiana
- Orangeville, New York
- Orangeville, Ohio
- Orangeville, Pennsylvania
- Orangeville, Utah
- Orangeville Township, Orange County, Indiana
- Orangeville Township, Michigan
- Rise at Orangeville, a natural spring in Orange County, Indiana
- Orangeville, Baltimore, Maryland, a neighborhood in Baltimore

== Schools ==
- Orangeville District Secondary School, Orangeville, Ontario, Canada
- Orangeville High School, Orangeville, Illinois, USA; a combined elementary-middle-high school

== Other uses ==
- HMCS Orangeville (K491), a WWII Castle class corvette
- Orangeville Junction, Utah, USA; a road junction
- Orangeville Brampton Railway, Ontario, Canada

== See also ==
- Orangeville Aerodrome
- Orange (disambiguation)
- ville (disambiguation)
