= List of highways numbered 462 =

The following highways are numbered 462:

== Canada ==
- Manitoba Provincial Road 462
- Newfoundland and Labrador Route 462

== Japan ==
- Japan National Route 462

== United States ==
- Indiana State Road 462
- Kentucky Route 462
- Maryland Route 462
- Montana Secondary Highway 462
- Pennsylvania Route 462
- Puerto Rico Highway 462
- South Carolina Highway 462
- Tennessee State Route 462
- Texas State Highway Loop 462 (former)

Preceded by 461	Lists of highways 462	Succeeded by 463
