= Hanging Rock =

Hanging Rock may refer to:

== Australia ==
- Hanging Rock, New South Wales, a mining village on the Northern Tablelands
- Hanging Rock, Victoria, a rock formation
  - Picnic at Hanging Rock (novel), a 1967 novel by Australian author Joan Lindsay
  - Picnic at Hanging Rock (film), a 1975 film adaptation of the novel

== United Kingdom ==
- Hanging Rock, County Fermanagh, a cliff in Northern Ireland

== United States ==
- Hanging Rock, Ohio, a village
- Hanging Rock Energy Facility, a natural-gas power plant near Hanging Rock, Ohio
- Hanging Rock, Virginia, an unincorporated community in Roanoke County
- Hanging Rock, West Virginia, an unincorporated community
- Hanging Rock (North Carolina), a mountain in Western North Carolina, also known as Bear's Paw
- Hanging Rock (Upper Merion Township, Pennsylvania), a formation
- Hanging Rock National Natural Landmark, Wabash County, Indiana
- Hanging Rock State Park, a North Carolina State Park in the Piedmont
- Hanging Rock (Wabash River), rock formation overlooking the Wabash River in Wabash County, Illinois

== See also ==
- Hanging Rocks, perpendicular cliffs in Hampshire County, West Virginia
- Hanging Stone, Granite rock feature in Siberia, Russia
