= List of highways numbered 470 =

The following highways are numbered 470:

== Brazil ==
- BR-470

== Canada ==
- Manitoba Provincial Road 470
- New Brunswick Route 470
- Newfoundland and Labrador Route 470

== Japan ==
- Japan National Route 470

== United States ==
- Interstate 470
- Colorado State Highway 470
  - E-470
- Florida State Road 470
- Iowa Highway 470
- Kentucky Route 470
- Maryland Route 470
- New York State Route 470
- Puerto Rico Highway 470

Preceded by 469	Lists of highways 470	Succeeded by 471
