= 471 (disambiguation) =

- For the year, see 471 or 471 BC
- For mathematical properties, see under 400 (number)

471 may also refer to:

- Highways numbered 471
- ČD Class 471 The Class 471 electric motor unit
- E471 glyceryl mono/distearate (food additive)
