= List of highways numbered 464 =

The following highways are numbered 464:

== Canada ==
- Manitoba Provincial Road 464

== Japan ==
- Japan National Route 464

== United States ==
- Interstate 464
- Arizona State Route 464 (former)
- Florida State Road 464
- Kentucky Route 464
- Maryland Route 464
- Puerto Rico Highway 464
- Texas:
  - Texas State Highway Loop 464
  - Farm to Market Road 465

Preceded by 463	Lists of highways 464	Succeeded by 465
