= List of highways numbered 467 =

== Canada ==
- Manitoba Provincial Road 467

== Japan ==
- Japan National Route 467

== United States ==
- Kentucky Route 467
- Louisiana Highway 467
- Maryland Route 467 (former)
- Pennsylvania Route 467
- Puerto Rico Highway 467
- Farm to Market Road 467

Preceded by 466	Lists of highways 467	Succeeded by 468
