= 4680 =

4680 may refer to:

- 4680 (number)
- 4680s (decade), and the year 4680 AD/CE
- IBM 4680 OS, a POS operating system based on Digital Research's Concurrent DOS 286 since 1986
- Round One Corporation (TYO: 4680), a Japan-based amusement store chain
- 4680 Lohrmann, an asteroid
- 4680 cell, a size of cylindrical rechargeable lithium-ion battery cell 46 millimetres in diameter, and 80 millimetres high

== See also ==
- 46800 (disambiguation)
- 468 (disambiguation)
- 468 (number)
