= List of highways numbered 466 =

The following highways are numbered 466:

== Canada ==
- Manitoba Provincial Road 466

== Japan ==
- Japan National Route 466

== United States ==
- U.S. Route 466 (former)
- Florida State Road 466 (former)
- Louisiana Highway 466

- Louisiana Highway 466-1 (former)
- Louisiana Highway 466-2 (former)
- Louisiana Highway 466-3 (former)
- Louisiana Highway 466-4 (former)
- Louisiana Highway 466-5 (former)
- Louisiana Highway 466-6 (former)
- Louisiana Highway 466-7 (former)
- Louisiana Highway 466-8 (former)
- Louisiana Highway 466-9 (former)
- Louisiana Highway 466-10
- Louisiana Highway 466-11 (former)
- Louisiana Highway 466-12 (former)
- Louisiana Highway 466-13 (former)
- Louisiana Highway 466-14 (former)
- Louisiana Highway 466-15 (former)
- Louisiana Highway 466-16 (former)

- Montana Secondary Highway 466
- Pennsylvania Route 466 (former)
- Puerto Rico Highway 466
- Farm to Market Road 466

Preceded by 465	Lists of highways 466	Succeeded by 467
