= Orangeville Aerodrome =

Orangeville Aerodrome, Orangeville Airport, Orangeville Airfield, or variation, may refer to:

- Orangeville/Brundle Field Aerodrome (TC id: COB4), Orangeville, Dufferin, Ontario, Canada
- Orangeville/Castlewood Field Aerodrome (TC id: CPV2), Orangeville, Dufferin, Ontario, Canada
- Orangeville/Laurel Aerodrome (TC id: COL2), Amaranth, Dufferin, Ontario, Canada
- Orangeville/Rosehill Aerodrome (TC id: COR8), Orangeville, Dufferin, Ontario, Canada

== See also ==
- Search for ... Orangeville Aerodrome
- Search for ... Orangeville Aeroport
- Search for ... Orangeville Airport
- Search for ... Orangeville Airfield
- Search for ... Orangeville Field
- Orangeville (disambiguation)
