= Lost River (Indiana) =

River in Indiana, United States

Coordinates: 38°32′14″N 86°49′14″W

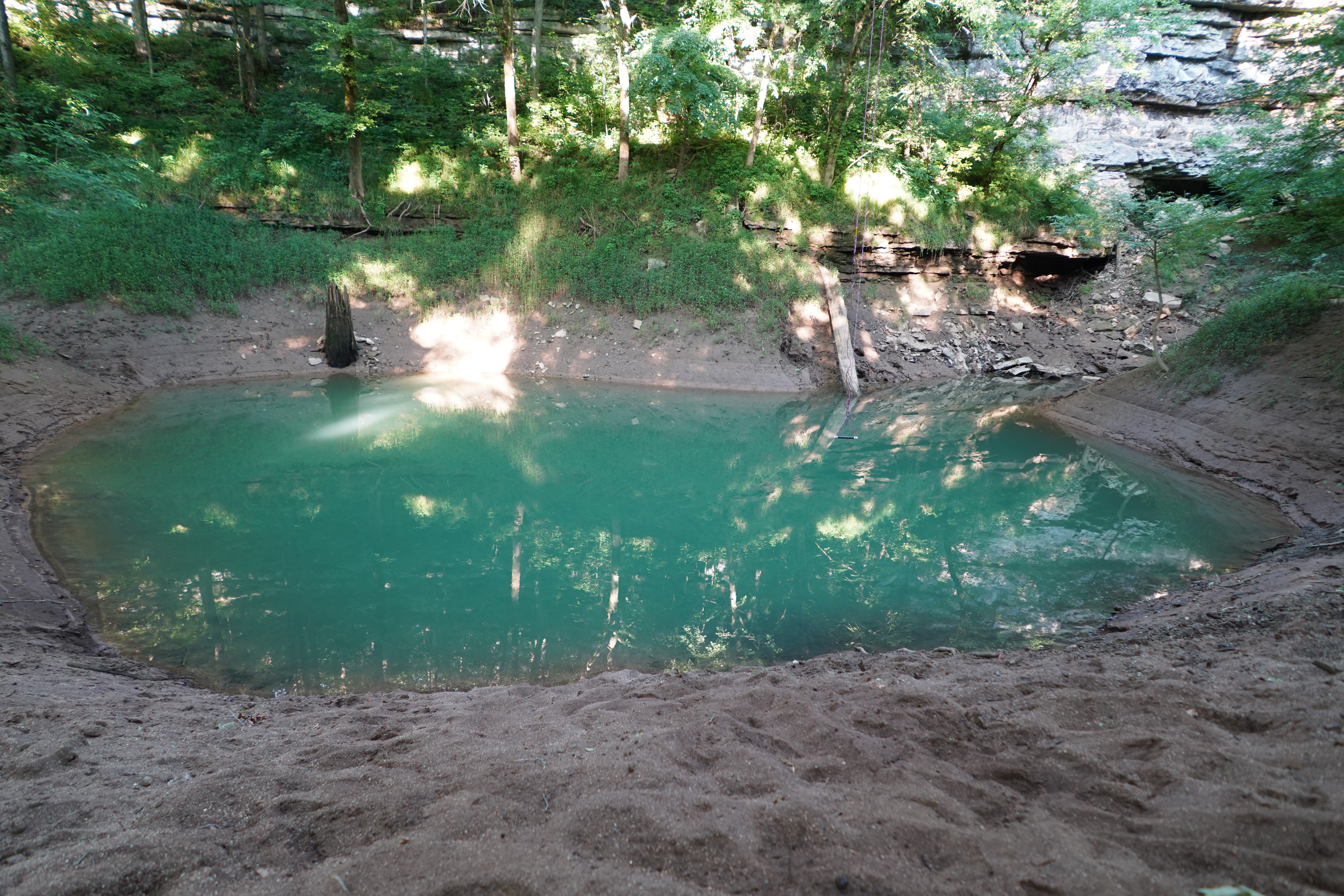
Wesley Chapel Gulf

The Lost River is a river that rises in Vernon Township, Washington County, Indiana, and discharges into the East Fork of the White River in Lost River Township, Martin County, Indiana. The river's unusual hydrology has led to two of its features being named as National Natural Landmarks.

== Description ==
The Lost River is about 87 miles (140 km) long, and its name is derived from the fact that at least 23 miles (37 km) of the primary course of the river flows completely underground. The river's underground channels may in fact cover hundreds of miles, as the caverns have never been fully explored. The river disappears into a series of sink holes of the type that are abundant in the karstland of southern Indiana. In one square mile there are as many as 1,022 sink holes. The river slips into and out of these sink holes at various points flowing into hidden caverns that connect with multiple other streams, rivers, and springs.

The Lost River begins as a normal river in Washington County, but soon after rising, the river flows over and into a limestone bed (karst) for several miles until the stream bed turns dry; the water is absorbed into the limestone and sinks beneath the surface to a hidden cavern.

The river then flows underground through a network of caves and channels through part of Orleans Township, Paoli Township, and part of Orangeville Township before reappearing on the surface near the village of Orangeville. Where the river rises to the surface in Orange County it produces a spring that is 165 feet (50 m) deep, with the very bottom connecting to the actual underground channel. This spring, the second largest in the state, is known as the True Rise, because many inaccurately believe that the Orangeville Rise is the main channel of the river. The Orangeville rise is a likely tributary of the underground Lost River. The river then continues its westward flow above ground.

At most times and under most conditions, other than extreme flooding, the westward-flowing Lost River vanishes into a series of sinkholes in a river bed located close to Indiana State Road 337 four miles (6 km) east of Orleans. The sinkholes into which the river flows are progressively the Stein Swallowhole, then Turner Swallowhole, and, by far the largest, the Tolliver Swallowhole. The river then flows underground to the National Natural Landmark Wesley Chapel Gulf, which is 8.3 acres (34,000 m^{2}) large and forms a box canyon with 30-to-100-foot-high (9.1 to 30.5 m) bedrock walls, where the river briefly appears before once again disappearing below the surface.

Approaching southern Martin County, the river resurfaces from another sink hole. It then flows westward past West Baden Springs and French Lick and flows into the East Fork of the White River.

At its mouth, the river's estimated mean annual flow rate is 432.1 cubic feet per second (12.24 m^{3}/s). A USGS stream gauge on the river near Prospect recorded a mean annual discharge of 282.3 cu ft/s (7.99 m^{3}/s) during water years 2010–2019. The highest daily mean discharge during that period was 6,030 cu ft/s (171 m^{3}/s) on May 3, 2011. The lowest daily mean discharge was 4.3 cu ft/s (0.12 m^{3}/s) on September 23, 2012.

== Underground segments ==
The submerged river and its tributaries probably flow through not one, but a multitude of different channels in the Orleans-Paoli area, most of which are unmapped or poorly understood. A significant number of sinkholes, some of them of significant dimensions in and of themselves, mark pathways of the underground river and its various channels. It is possible that the Lost River is carving a cave system for itself of dimensions similar to that of the Mammoth Cave system in nearby Kentucky.

Since 1996 a group from primarily the St. Joseph Valley Grotto has been surveying passages of what is now called the Lost River System. As of July 2008 the cave system stands at 20.91 miles (33.65 km) in length. This places it as the second longest cave in Indiana and the 26th longest in the US.

In addition to the underground channels that the Lost River uses for most of its flow, the river also possesses and utilizes a dry surface bed. During flood times all or part of the river's network of underground channels becomes saturated with water, and part of the Lost River flows in its surface bed in the same manner as a normal river.

== National Natural Landmarks ==
The Wesley Chapel Gulf in eastern Orangeville Township is a 8.3 acres (34,000 m^{2}) sinkhole which was caused by the collapse of the rock roof over one of the underground channels of the Lost River. It is part of Hoosier National Forest. In 1972, Wesley Chapel Gulf was designated as a National Natural Landmark by the National Park Service.

The Orangeville Rise in central Orangeville Township is a spring from which water wells up in one of the discharge points from the underground hydrological network that carries the flow of the Lost River. It is a tributary to the Lost River.

== See also ==
- List of rivers of Indiana
