= 46800 =

46800 may refer to:

- 46800 (number)
- 46800 (year)
- Xàtiva (postal code: 46800), a town in Valencia, Spain
- A postal code for several communes of the Lot department
- A main-belt asteroid
- A battery size for lithium-ion cylindrical rechargeable battery cells

== See also ==
- 4680 (disambiguation)
- 468 (disambiguation)
- 468 AD/CE (ISO year +468)
- 468 (number)
