= List of highways numbered 465 =

The following highways are numbered 465:

== Canada ==
- Manitoba Provincial Road 465
- New Brunswick Route 465

== Japan ==
- Japan National Route 465

== United States ==
- Interstate 465
- Missouri Route 465
- Pennsylvania Route 465
- Puerto Rico Highway 465
- Farm to Market Road 465

Preceded by 464	Lists of highways 465	Succeeded by 466
