= List of highways numbered 469 =

The following highways are numbered 469:

== Canada ==
- Manitoba Provincial Road 469

== Japan ==
- Japan National Route 469

== United States ==
- Interstate 469
- Florida State Road 469 (pre-1945) (former)
- Louisiana Highway 469
- Mississippi Highway 469
- Puerto Rico Highway 469

Preceded by 468	Lists of highways 469	Succeeded by 470
