= Pigeon River Fish and Wildlife Area =

Protected area in northeastern Indiana, U.S.

- IUCN category IV (habitat/species management area)
- Location within Indiana
- Location: LaGrange and Steuben counties, Indiana, United States
- Nearest city: Mongo, Indiana
- Coordinates: 41°40′40″N 85°15′12″W
- Area: 12,134 acres (49.1 km^{2})
- Established: 1956
- Governing body: Indiana Department of Natural Resources
- Website: www.in.gov/dnr/fishwild/3086.htm

Pigeon River Fish and Wildlife Area is a protected area in northeastern Indiana that covers 12,134 acres (4,910 ha) and is dedicated to providing hunting and fishing opportunities. The area includes 529 acres (214 ha) of lakes and 17 miles (27 km) along the Pigeon River. It is located on Indiana State Road 3, near Mongo in Lagrange County. The Fish and Wildlife Area contains Tamarack Bog Nature Preserve, a 150-acre (61 ha) wetland parcel that has been designated as a National Natural Landmark.

== Wildlife ==
During the spring and fall migrations, waterfowl are at their peak abundance. The area is open during the appropriate hunting seasons, and trapping in the wetlands is allowed but subject to selection through a drawing.

== Facilities ==
- Wildlife viewing
- Picnicking
- Ice fishing
- Hunting
- Trapping
- Shooting range
- Archery range
- Dog training area
- Boat ramp (electric trolling motors only)
- Dump station
- Primitive camping (44 sites)
