= Harrison–Crawford State Forest =

State forest in Indiana, U.S.

- Location within Indiana
- Location: Harrison County and Crawford, Indiana, USA
- Nearest city: Corydon, Indiana
- Coordinates: 38°12′0″N 86°18′0″W
- Area: 24,000 acres (97.12 km^{2})
- Established: 1932
- Governing body: Indiana Department of Natural Resources
- Website: www.in.gov/dnr/forestry/4826.htm

Harrison–Crawford State Forest is a large tract of protected forests in the far southern portion of the U.S. state of Indiana, straddling the border between Harrison and Crawford counties.

== History ==
Harrison–Crawford State Forest was established in 1932 when the state purchased a few hundred acres of badly eroded farmland from cash-strapped landowners during the depression. The total acreage has been expanded over the years to now include 24,000 acres (9,700 ha) in western Harrison County as well as parts of Crawford County and a little in Orange County. The state forest surrounds O'Bannon Woods State Park (created in 2005) and the Wyandotte Caves.

== Geography ==
The forest has large public-access areas, including C-class camping sites. There are 25 miles (40 km) of hiking trails ranging from beginner to advanced trails. In the state forest and O'Bannon Woods State Park combined, there are about 80 miles (130 km) of looped horse trails that run through two properties. There is fishing in the scenic Blue River, and limited picnicking at Stage Stop campground. The state forest also permits hunting to anyone with a hunting license. The forest is rich in wild game including white tail deer, wild turkey, and squirrel. Protected and threatened species such as the Eastern hellbender, cerulean warbler, woodrat, spadefoot toad, bobcat, bald eagle and Short's goldenrod are found here as well.

The Ohio River runs along the southern edge of the forest and there are many scenic views of the river. The Blue River bisects the forest running from the north into the Ohio River on the south side of the forest. Blue River is recognized as a state natural, scenic, and recreational river. The river takes on a beautiful aqua coloration during dry periods, owing to large amount of dissolved limestone in the water. Aquatic species that require relatively pollution free water such as mussels and hellbenders are found here.

A 100 feet (30 m) high fire tower overlooks the forest and was used in the early days to watch for wild fires.

Indiana State Road 62 runs through the center of the state forest with state road 462 branching off to connect to O'Bannon Woods State Park

O'Bannon Woods State Park was created in 2005 from land that was once part of the state forest and is surrounded by the state forest and sees many visitors each year. Wyandotte Caves is also within the boundaries of the forest.

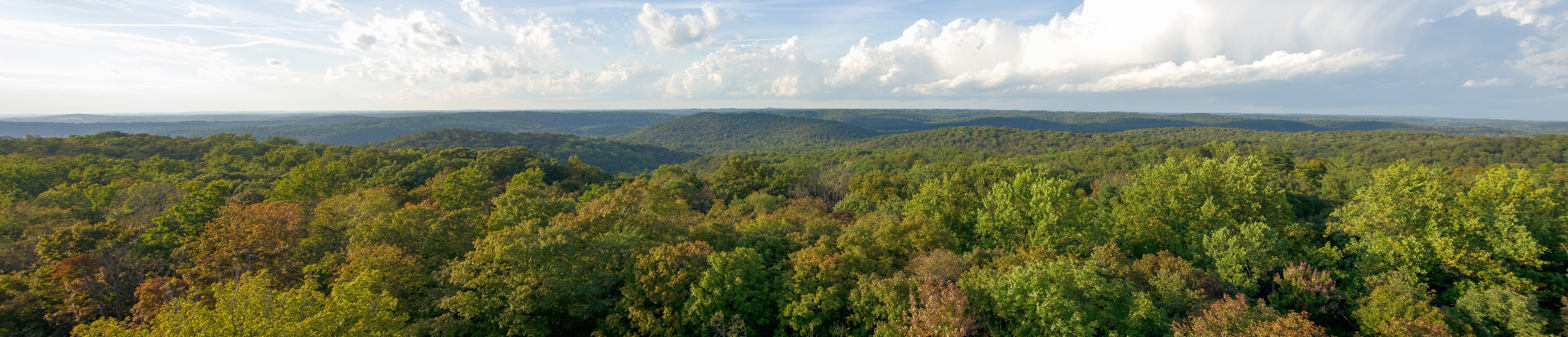
Harrison-Crawford State Forest viewed from the fire-tower at O'Bannon Woods State Park
