= USS LST-468 =

1942 LST-1-class tank landing ship

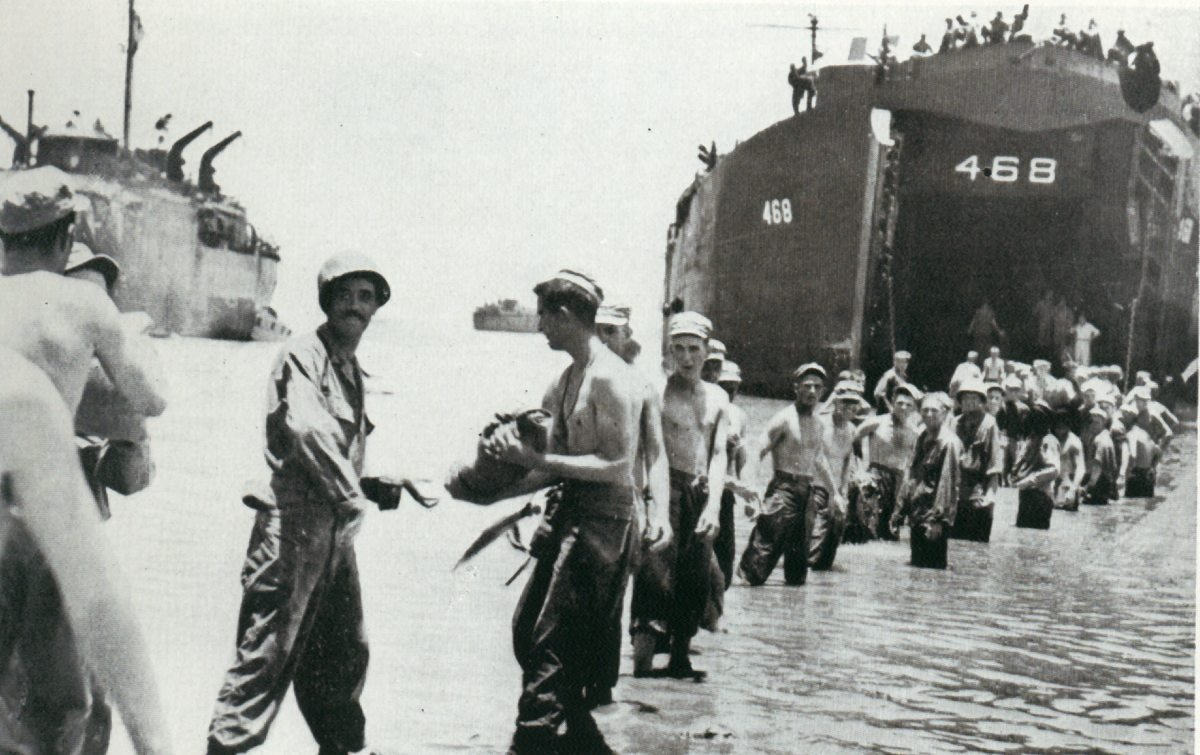
- A working party landing stores from USS LST-468 to the beach. Note two unidentified LST's in background.

History

United States
- Name: LST-468
- Ordered: as a Type S3-M-K2 hull, MCE hull 988
- Builder: Kaiser Shipbuilding Company, Vancouver, Washington
- Yard number: 172
- Laid down: 20 October 1942
- Launched: 24 November 1942
- Commissioned: 5 March 1943
- Decommissioned: 2 April 1946
- Stricken: 5 June 1946
- Identification: Hull symbol: LST-468; Code letters: NFUM
- Honors and awards: 7 × battle stars
- Fate: Sold for scrapping, 30 September 1947

General characteristics
- Class & type: LST-1-class tank landing ship
- Displacement: 4,080 long tons (4,145 t) full load; 2,160 long tons (2,190 t) landing
- Length: 328 ft (100 m) oa
- Beam: 50 ft (15 m)
- Draft: Full load: 8 ft 2 in (2.49 m) forward; 14 ft 1 in (4.29 m) aft; Landing at 2,160 t: 3 ft 11 in (1.19 m) forward; 9 ft 10 in (3.00 m) aft
- Installed power: 2 × 900 hp (670 kW) Electro-Motive Diesel 12-567A diesel engines; 1,700 shp (1,300 kW)
- Propulsion: 1 × Falk main reduction gears; 2 × Propellers
- Speed: 12 kn (22 km/h; 14 mph)
- Range: 24,000 nmi (44,000 km; 28,000 mi) at 9 kn (17 km/h; 10 mph) while displacing 3,960 long tons (4,024 t)
- Boats & landing craft carried: 2 or 6 x LCVPs
- Capacity: 2,100 tons oceangoing maximum; 350 tons main deckload
- Troops: 16 officers, 147 enlisted men
- Complement: 13 officers, 104 enlisted men
- Armament: Varied, ultimate armament; 2 × twin 40 mm (1.57 in) Bofors guns; 4 × single 40 mm Bofors guns; 12 × 20 mm (0.79 in) Oerlikon cannons

Service record
- Part of: LST Flotilla 7
- Operations: Eastern New Guinea operations; Lae occupation (4–10 September 1943); Saidor occupation (2–4, 5–7, 6–11 January, 12–14 February 1944); Bismarck Archipelago operations; Cape Gloucester, New Britain (26–29 December 1943, 23–26 February 1944); Admiralty Islands landings (4–8 March 1944); Hollandia operation (21–25 April 1944); Western New Guinea operations; Biak Islands operation (27–29 May, 31 May–4 June 1944); Noemfoor Island operation (12–18 July 1944); Cape Sansapor operation (21 July, 6, 8–14 August 1944); Morotai landing (15 September 1944); Leyte landings (13–27 October, 5–18 November 1944); Lingayen Gulf landings (4–16 January 1945); Consolidation and capture of Southern Philippines; Mindanao Island landings (17–23 April 1945)
- Awards: Navy Unit Commendation; American Campaign Medal; Asiatic–Pacific Campaign Medal; World War II Victory Medal; Philippine Republic Presidential Unit Citation; Philippine Liberation Medal

USS LST-468 was a United States Navy LST-1-class tank landing ship used in the Asiatic-Pacific Theater during World War II. As with many of her class, the ship was never named. Instead, she was referred to by her hull designation.

== Construction ==
The ship was laid down on 20 October 1942, under Maritime Commission (MARCOM) contract, MC hull 988, by Kaiser Shipyards, Vancouver, Washington; launched 24 November 1942; and commissioned on 5 March 1943.

== Service history ==
During World War II, LST-468 was assigned to the Asiatic-Pacific theater. She took part in the Eastern New Guinea operations, the Lae occupation in September 1943, and the Saidor occupation in January and February 1944; the Bismarck Archipelago operations, the Cape Gloucester, New Britain landings in December 1943 and February 1944, and the Admiralty Islands landings in March 1944; Hollandia operation in April 1944; the Western New Guinea operations, the Biak Islands operation in May and June 1944, the Noemfoor Island operation in July 1944, the Cape Sansapor operation in August 1944, and the Morotai landing in September 1944; the Leyte operation in October and November 1944; the Lingayen Gulf landings in January 1945; the consolidation and capture of the Southern Philippines, the Mindanao Island landings in April 1945.

Following the war, LST-468 returned to the United States and was decommissioned on 12 April 1946, and struck from the Navy list on 5 June, that same year. On 30 September 1947, the tank landing ship was sold to the Patapsco Scrap Corp., Baltimore, Maryland, and subsequently scrapped.

== Honors and awards ==
LST-468 earned seven battle stars for her World War II service.

== Notes ==
Citations

== Bibliography ==
Online resources

- "LST-468". Dictionary of American Naval Fighting Ships. Naval History and Heritage Command. This article incorporates text from this source, which is in the public domain.
- "Kaiser Vancouver, Vancouver WA". www.ShipbuildingHistory.com. 27 November 2010.
- "USS LST-468". NavSource. 16 May 2014.
