= Meltzer Woods =

Forest in Indiana, United States

- Location within Indiana
- Location: Liberty Township, Shelby County, Indiana
- Nearest city: Shelbyville
- Coordinates: 39°30′10″N 85°40′04″W
- Area: 48 acres (19 ha)

U.S. National Natural Landmark
- Designated: 1973

Meltzer Woods consists of 48 acres (19 ha) of old-growth forest located in Central Indiana. The woods have been included in Indiana's Classified Forest Program since 1928. They are currently protected by the Meltzer family in partnership with the Central Indiana Land Trust. The woods were designated a National Natural Landmark in 1973.

== History ==
- 1857 – John Frederick Meltzer purchases the first 160 acres (0.65 km^{2}) of farm land
- 1920 – Brady Meltzer (John's son) and Philip Meltzer (grandson) make additional purchases. The farm now totals 280 acres (1.1 km^{2}).
- 1928 – 48 acres (19 ha) of the Meltzer farm that were never cleared are added to Indiana's Classified Forest Program
- 1973 – Designated a National Natural Landmark

== Threats ==
Purple winter creeper (Euonymus fortunei) and garlic mustard (Alliaria petiolata) currently threaten the forest. It is expected to take thousands of hours of labor to control these invasive species.
