= Autovía A-461 =

Highway in Andalusia, Spain

The Autovía A-461 is a highway in Spain. It passes through Andalusia.
