= List of highways numbered 471 =

The following highways are numbered 471:

== Canada ==
- Manitoba Provincial Road 471

== Cuba ==
- Zulueta–Menesus Road (4–471)

== Israel ==
- Highway 471 (Israel)

== Japan ==
- Japan National Route 471

== United States ==
- Interstate 471
- Alabama
  - County Route 471 (Chilton County, Alabama)
  - County Route 471 (Dallas County, Alabama)
  - County Route 471 (Jackson County, Alabama)
  - County Route 471 (Lee County, Alabama)
  - County Route 471 (Randolph County, Alabama)
- Arkansas Highway 471
- Florida State Road 471
- Kentucky Route 471
- Louisiana Highway 471
- Maryland Route 471
- Mississippi Highway 471
- North Carolina Highway 471
- Pennsylvania Route 471
- Puerto Rico Highway 471
- South Dakota Highway 471
- Texas:
  - Texas State Highway Loop 471
  - Texas State Highway Spur 471
  - Farm to Market Road 471

Preceded by 470	Lists of highways 471	Succeeded by 472
