= List of highways numbered 463 =

The following highways are numbered 463:

== Canada ==
- Manitoba Provincial Road 463
- Newfoundland and Labrador Route 463

== Japan ==
- Japan National Route 463

== United States ==
- Arkansas Highway 463
- Louisiana Highway 463
- Mississippi Highway 463
- Pennsylvania Route 463
- Puerto Rico Highway 463
- South Carolina Highway 463 (former)
- Texas:
  - Texas State Highway Loop 463
  - Farm to Market Road 463

Preceded by 462	Lists of highways 463	Succeeded by 464
