= Blue River (Indiana) =

Coordinates: 38°10′55″N 86°19′44″W

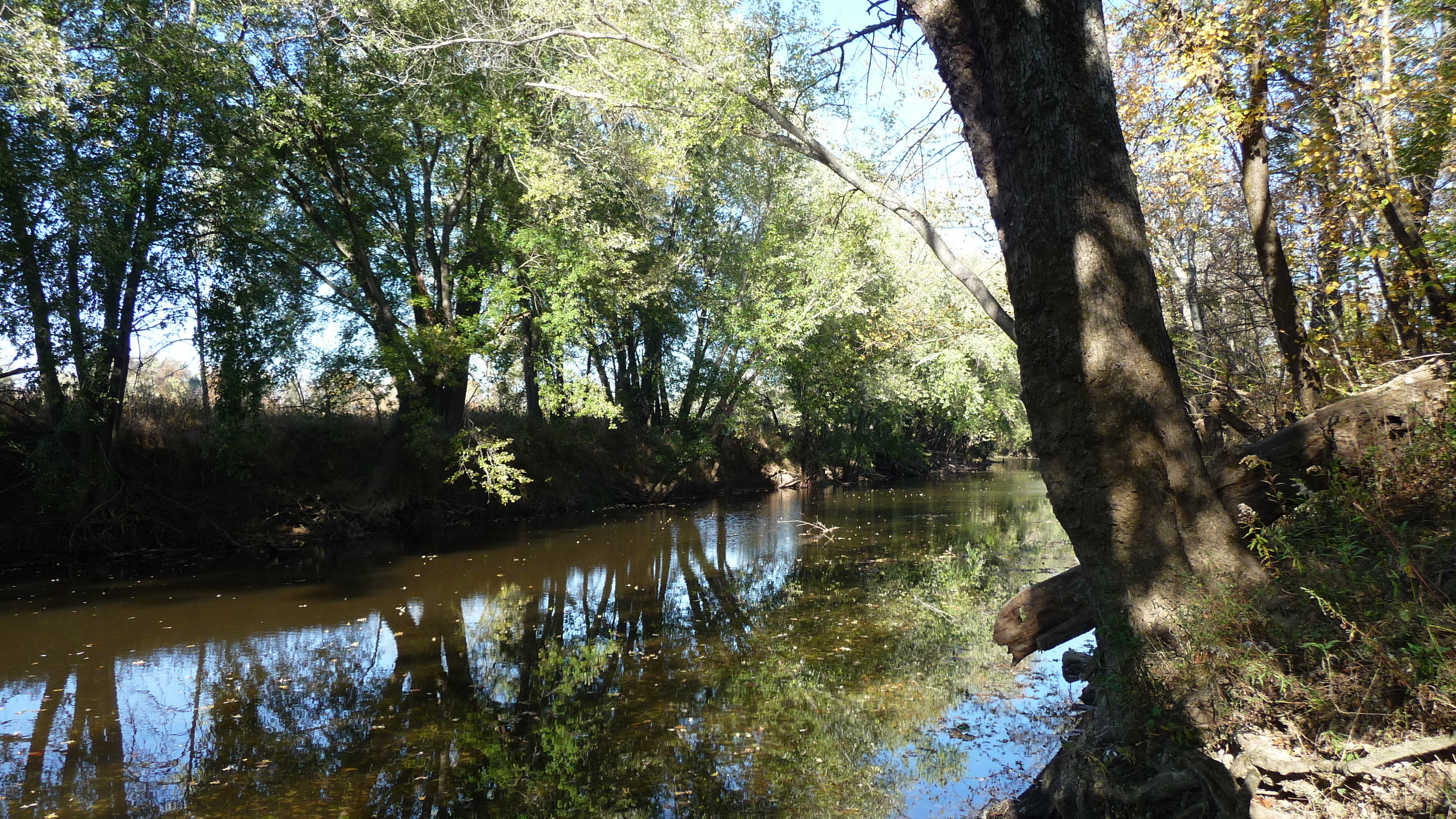

Location
- Country: United States

Physical characteristics
- Source
  - location: near Salem, Indiana
- Mouth
  - location: Ohio River
- Discharge
  - location: Leavenworth, Indiana
  - average: 696 cu/ft. per sec.

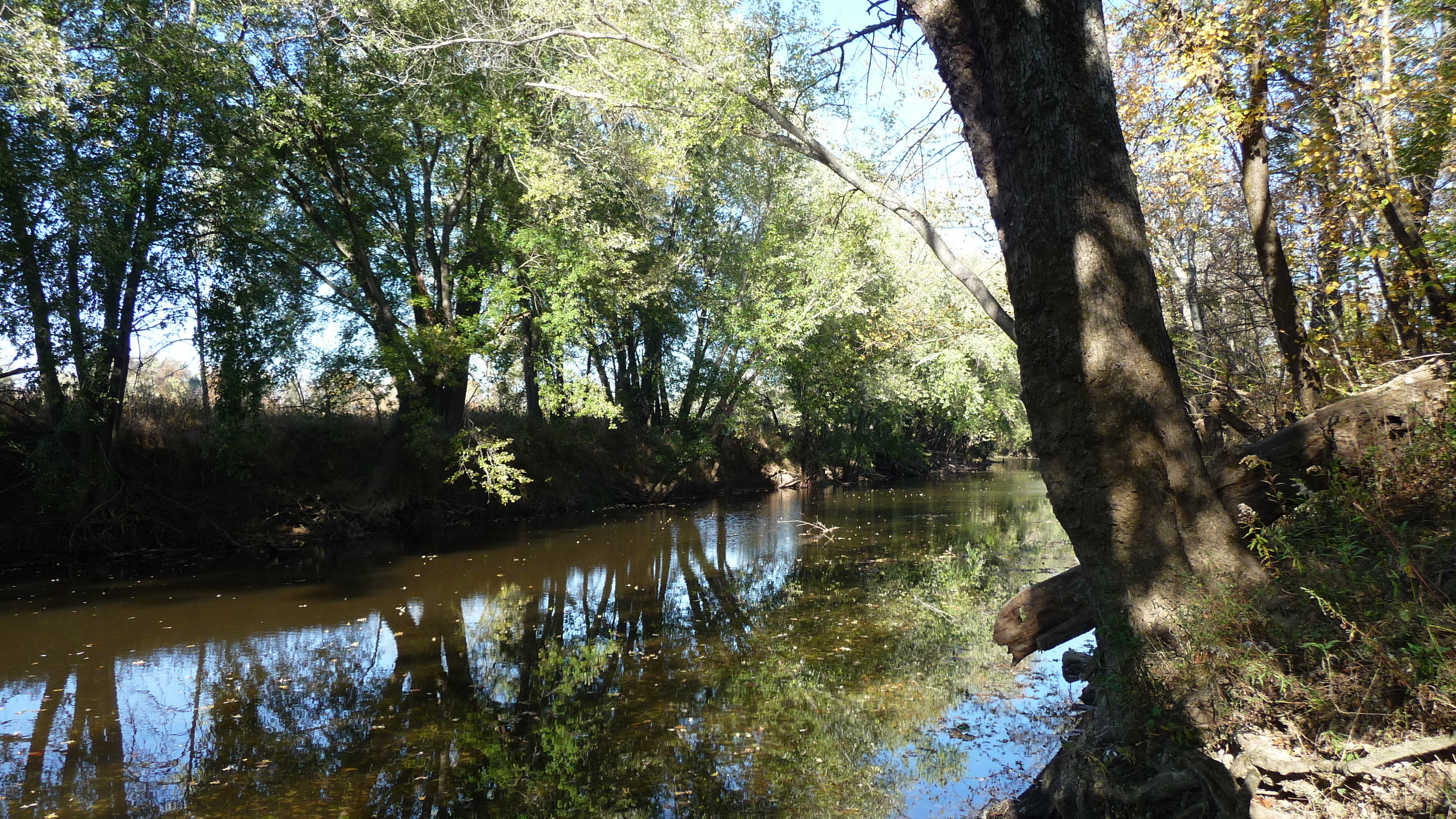
The Blue River in late summer, just south of Fredericksburg, Indiana.

The Blue River is a 57-mile-long (92 km), two-forked stream that runs through Harrison, Crawford and Washington counties in Indiana. The headwaters of the North Fork arise near Salem in Washington County and flow south, and the headwaters of the South Fork arise near New Liberty and flow southwest. The two small forks converge in Fredericksburg. From the confluence, the river flows south until it joins Ohio River in the Harrison-Crawford State Forest, just upstream from Leavenworth.

The Blue River is known for its scenery and is one of the main destinations in Southern Indiana for canoeing and kayaking. Receiving a sizeable amount of water from subterranean sources, the Blue River was named for the blueish cast of its clear waters which remain clear, except in times after heavy rain. The area surrounding the main course of the river is relatively undeveloped and heavily wooded. Many large hills, limestone bluffs, and caves can be seen from the river.

The river is divided into four segments, designating the river as scenic, recreational and natural, and is managed by the Blue River Commission.

== Course ==
=== Headwaters ===
==== North Fork and South Fork ====
The North Fork begins north of Salem and flows southwards through the town. It then continues south, passing through farmland until joining the South Fork in Fredericksburg. The South Fork has its headwaters in New Liberty at the confluence of Springle Creek and Poplar Branch. The stream then flows southwest, through New Pekin, and continues southwest through rolling hills and farmland until it meets with the North Fork in Fredericksburg.

Both forks of the river – essentially large creeks – are small and not navigable, even to small boats. Neither fork has a major tributary but only small streams that minimally add to their size. Beck's Mill, a restored 19th century gristmill, is located on Mill Creek, a tributary of the North Fork.

=== Main River ===
The main river starts its 57.15 mile journey to the Ohio at the confluence of its two forks in Fredericksburg. From here the river is navigable by canoe and has several public access points. From Fredericksburg the river heads south, meandering from farmland into increasingly wooded areas surrounded by large bluffs. Gentle rapids that characterize the river are present until the river nears Milltown, the largest settlement on the river. There, at the site of an old mill, a large dam pools the water of the river for over a mile. The dam deepens the water so that larger boats, such as small fishing boats, can access and navigate a portion of the river; however, it requires canoes traveling the river to portage, and put in directly below the dam.

From Milltown, the river continues south. A small dam at the site of Rothrock's Mill requires portage from travelers, but it is the last obstruction on the river. The river briefly turns southeast and is joined by the waters from Harrison Spring, the largest spring in Indiana. It continues to White Cloud where the river turns Southwest.

From White Cloud, the river continues unobstructed through the Harrison-Crawford State Forest. The last section of the river is in dense and protected forests, but it is also very accessible from multiple points in the state forest and in O'Bannon Woods State Park. The mouth of the Blue River is on the Ohio River, just upstream of Leavenworth.

== Recreation ==
Blue River is a popular destination for canoeing and kayaking. Adventurers may enter the river at one of several public access points. Additionally, Cave Country Canoes in Milltown and Old Mill Canoe Rental in Fredericksburg rent equipment and provide lodging to visitors.

Blue River Access Points
Access Site	Type	Milage	Location
Old Mill	Private	57	Fredericksburg, IN
Totten Ford Bridge	Private	40	Milltown, IN
Milltown Dam	Public	33.5	Milltown, IN
Rothrock's Mill	Public	20.5	Milltown, IN
Blue River Chapel	Public	11	Corydon, IN
Stage Stop	Public	10	Corydon, IN
Old Iron Bridge	Public	3	Leavenworth, IN
Mouth of Blue (on the Ohio River)	Public	0	Leavenworth, IN

== Ecology ==
The Blue River supports varieties of species typical to Indiana. Varieties of fish include smallmouth bass, largemouth bass, bluegill, and crappie. Many birds, including ducks, geese, bald eagles, and herons are also frequently seen near the river. Indiana Bats, an endangered species, live in many caves nearby the river.

== Settlements ==
In pre-Columbian times, Native Americans mined the blueish-gray chert and flint in the Ohio Valley for arrowheads, spearheads, and other weapons and tools. The first European and American Explorers came to the region traveling along the Ohio River. Squire Boone, the younger brother of Daniel Boone, is considered the first modern explorer of the river. In the 1800s, American settlers came to the Ohio Valley to build towns, businesses, and trade by riverboat. Water mills were built along the Blue River to supply demand from local farms. Towns such as Fredericksburg and Milltown flourished. As watermills in the United States went into decline after the arrival of electricity, so did many of the towns alongside the river. Fredericksburg, incorporated in 1859, was especially prone to flooding. The town disincorporated in 2012. In the absence of a mill, Milltown's main industry has shifted to tourism, as many tourists embark on their river journeys from Milltown.

== See also ==
- List of rivers of Indiana
- Wyandotte Caves
- Squire Boone Caverns
- Indiana Caverns
