= Interstate 470 =

Interstate 470 may refer to:

- Interstate 470 (Kansas), a loop around Topeka
- Interstate 470 (Missouri), a connection at Kansas City
- Interstate 470 (Ohio–West Virginia), a loop around Wheeling, West Virginia
- Three highways which are part of what was once proposed as an Interstate 470 around Denver, Colorado:
  - Colorado State Highway 470
  - E-470
  - Northwest Parkway
