= Rise at Orangeville =

Spring in Indiana, United States

Orangeville Rise
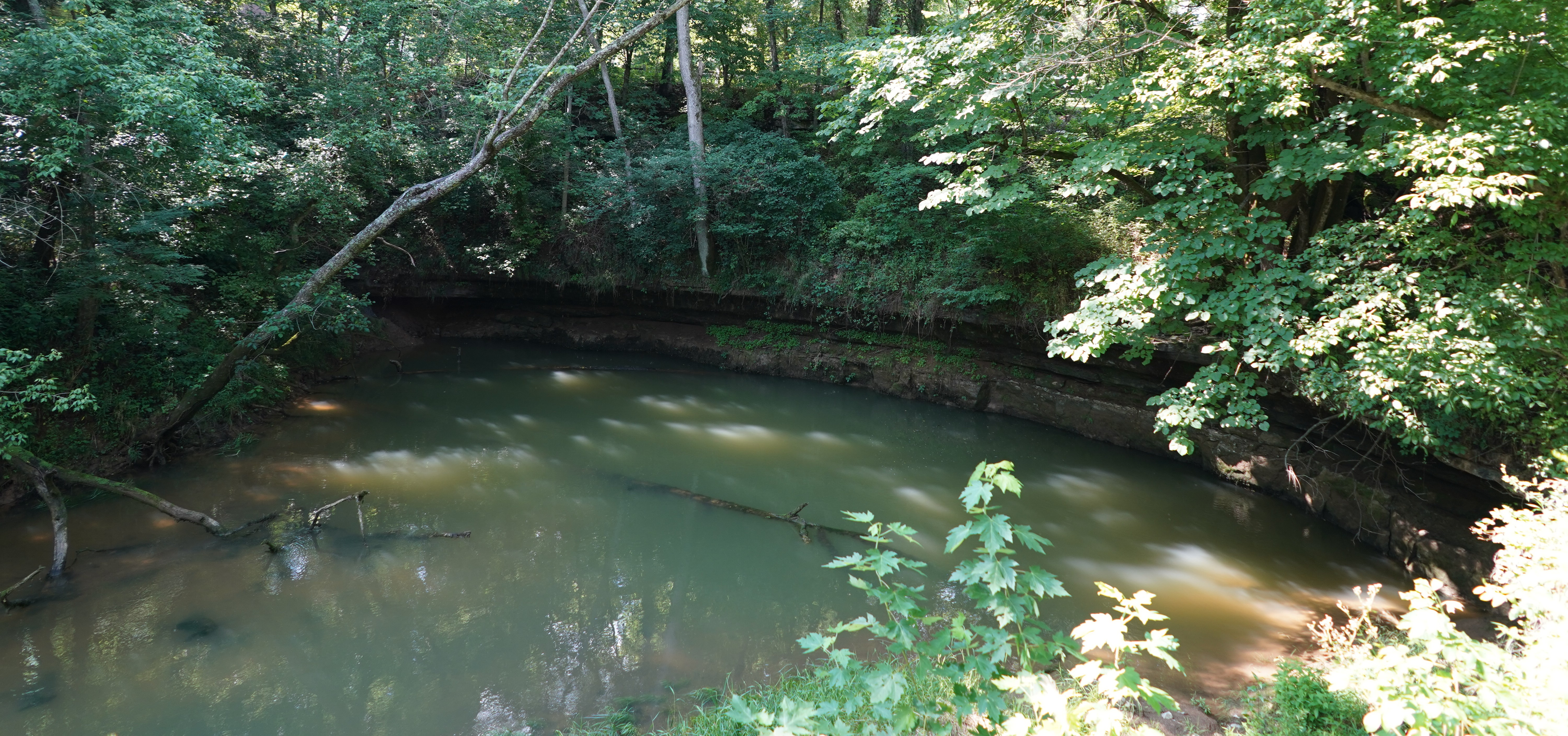
- Orangeville Rise

- Location within Indiana Location within the United States
- Location: Orange County, Indiana
- Nearest city: Orangeville
- Coordinates: 38°37′52″N 86°33′26″W
- Area: 3 acres (1.2 ha)

U.S. National Natural Landmark
- Designated: 1972

Orangeville Rise is the second largest spring in the U.S. state of Indiana, in Orange County near Orangeville. It was designated a National Natural Landmark in June 1972. It is owned and managed by The Nature Conservancy and the Indiana Karst Conservancy.

== Geology ==
Contrary to popular belief, the spring is not a rise of the Lost River which surfaces approximately 2 miles (3.2 km) south of Orangeville. Water emerging at Orangeville Rise comes from approximately 48 square miles (120 km^{2}) of the highly karstified Mitchell Plain to the northeast. The spring fluctuates wildly in response to drought and rain events, with storm discharge appearing less than 24 hours following an event.

== See also ==
- Lost River (Indiana)
