= List of highways numbered 468 =

The following highways are numbered 468:

== Canada ==
- Manitoba Provincial Road 468

== Japan ==
- Japan National Route 468

== United States ==
- Florida State Road 468 (former)
- Louisiana Highway 468
- Maryland Route 468
- Mississippi Highway 468
- Puerto Rico Highway 468
- Farm to Market Road 468

Preceded by 467	Lists of highways 468	Succeeded by 469
