= Fern Cliff Nature Preserve =

Protected area in Indiana, United States

- IUCN category V (protected landscape/seascape)
- Location within Indiana Location within the United States
- Location: Putnam County, Indiana, US
- Nearest city: Greencastle
- Coordinates: 39°36′36″N 86°57′54″W
- Area: 157 acres (0.64 km^{2})
- Governing body: Nature Conservancy

The Fern Cliff Nature Preserve is a 157 acres (64 ha) land parcel of steep and near-vertical rock and stone surfaces located in Putnam County, Indiana, near Greencastle. It is a National Natural Landmark. The Nature Conservancy has custody over this nature preserve, and operates it as a botanical refuge. Parking for the trailhead is at the southwest corner of the Preserve.

== Description ==
The Fern Cliff Nature Preserve, with its steep slopes, exposed rock surfaces, and significant areas that get little or no direct sunlight, is a place of non-standard plant life, including many ferns and bryophytes. The Nature Conservancy calls the land parcel "a botanists' floral paradise".

Fern Cliff's geology is characterized by thick, crumbling layers of sandstone. Its wooded ravines contains oak, beech, hickory, sugar maple, ash, wild cherry, tuliptree, and other Eastern Woodland trees. Several of these tree types have, however, been hit hard by epidemic blights. The Nature Preserve's non-standard botany is highly vulnerable to invasive species. The Indiana Department of Natural Resources (IDNR) works as ally and partner with the Natural Conservancy in the labor-intensive work of maintaining the parcel.

Fern Cliff has a hiking trail, but sandstone rockclimbing is dangerous and not allowed. A section of the Nature Preserve is a repurposed sandstone quarry. High-quality container sand was extracted from crushed quarry stone, and a glass manufacturer in nearby Terre Haute used the sand to make the first bottles in which packaged Coca-Cola was sold.
