= Calvert and Porter Woods =

Protected area in Indiana, United States

- IUCN category V (protected landscape/seascape)
- Location within Indiana Location within the United States
- Location: Montgomery County, Indiana
- Nearest city: Crawfordsville, Indiana
- Coordinates: 40.023°N 86.722°W
- Area: 40 acres (16 ha)
- Website

U.S. National Natural Landmark
- Designated: 1974

The Calvert and Porter Woods Nature Preserve is a 40-acre old-growth forest located in Montgomery County, Indiana, near Crawfordsville. Identified as a surviving fragment of virgin Central Hardwood forest, a woodland type that largely vanished in the 1800s, it was designated as a National Natural Landmark in 1974.

== Description ==
The old-growth Calvert and Porter Woods Nature Preserve is located on the Tipton Till Plain, a morphological biome that contains mesic soil types and a significant moisture gradient for the preservation of numerous microecosystems. The U.S. National Park Service characterizes the woodlot as a significant tree-mature location for the great blue heron.

Most old-growth forest has vanished from Indiana. Long usage during the Industrial Revolution has ensured that most large trees have been cut down for timber or firewood. On this woodlot, several surviving trees measure over five feet (60 inches) in diameter. The Indiana Division of Forestry classifies the Calvert and Porter land parcel as "40 acres of one of the highest quality old growth woods in the state".

The Calvert and Porter Woods Nature Preserve is owned by the Indiana Department of Natural Resources (IDNR). As of 2023 IDNR has not, however, taken active steps to encourage visitation to the woods. There is no direct road access to the property parcel, no trails have been built on the woodlot, and prior permission is required for property access. Periodic opportunities create rare, but recurring, opportunities for those who are interested in signing up for a group hike led by a guide with site-oriented experience.
