= Hanging Rock and Wabash Reef National Natural Landmark =

Protected area in Indiana, United States

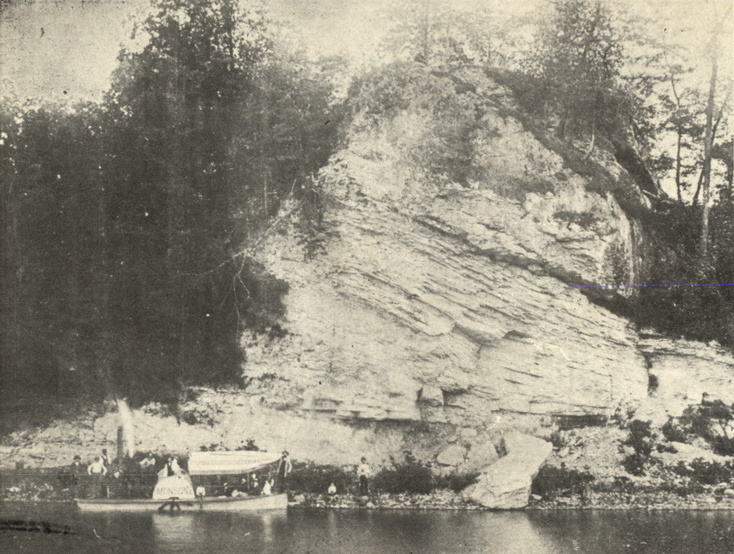
- Early postcard photo of Hanging Rock

- Location within Indiana
- Location: Wabash County, Indiana, United States
- Coordinates: 40.83°N 85.70722°W
- Area: 4 acres (1.6 ha)
- Established: 2009

U.S. National Natural Landmark
- Designated: 1986

Hanging Rock National Natural Landmark is a 4-acre (1.6 ha) site in Wabash County, Indiana, that was designated a National Natural Landmark in May 1986. The site, located on the southern bank of the Wabash River near the town of Lagro, contains an impressive natural exposure of fossilized coral reef dating from the Silurian Period some 400 million years ago. The limestone reef deposit rises 75 feet (23 m) above the river and is being undercut by it, giving the site its "hanging" appearance.

Hanging Rock is owned by Acres Land Trust, and is open to the public from sunrise to sunset. Camping and littering at Hanging Rock are prohibited.
