= O'Bannon Woods State Park =

State park in Harrison County, Indiana, US

- IUCN category III (natural monument or feature)
- Location within Indiana
- Location: Harrison County, Indiana, USA
- Nearest city: Corydon, Indiana
- Coordinates: 38.2281°N 86.2961°W
- Area: 2,000 acres (8.1 km^{2})
- Established: 2004
- Visitors: 121,880 (in 2018–2019)
- Governing body: Indiana Department of Natural Resources
- Operator: Stanley Baelz (park manager)
- Website: Official website

O'Bannon Woods State Park is a 2,000-acre (8 km^{2}) state park in the state of Indiana, 32 miles (51 km) west of Louisville, Kentucky.

O'Bannon Woods was originally known as the Wyandotte Woods State Recreation Area, which was part of the Harrison-Crawford State Forest. Its main attraction is Wyandotte Caves, which contain over nine miles of caverns and one of the world's largest underground "mountains". The Blue River runs through the park. Indiana DNR lists it as one of their "Seven Hidden Jewels".

The park was named for former governor Frank O'Bannon and houses the O'Bannon Woods Interpretive Center, which offers exhibits and nature programs year-round. The park receives about 120,000 visitors annually.

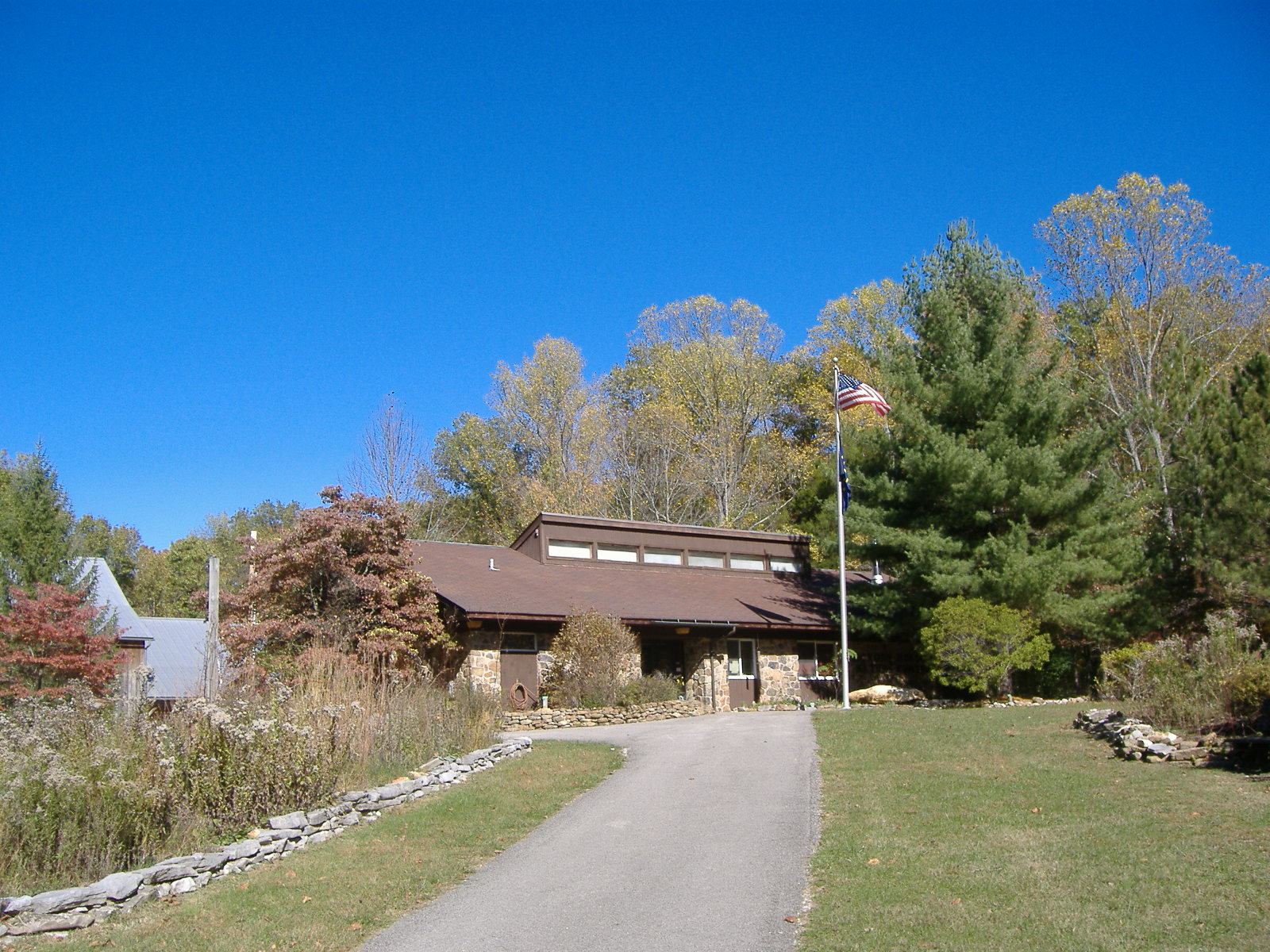
Nature Center

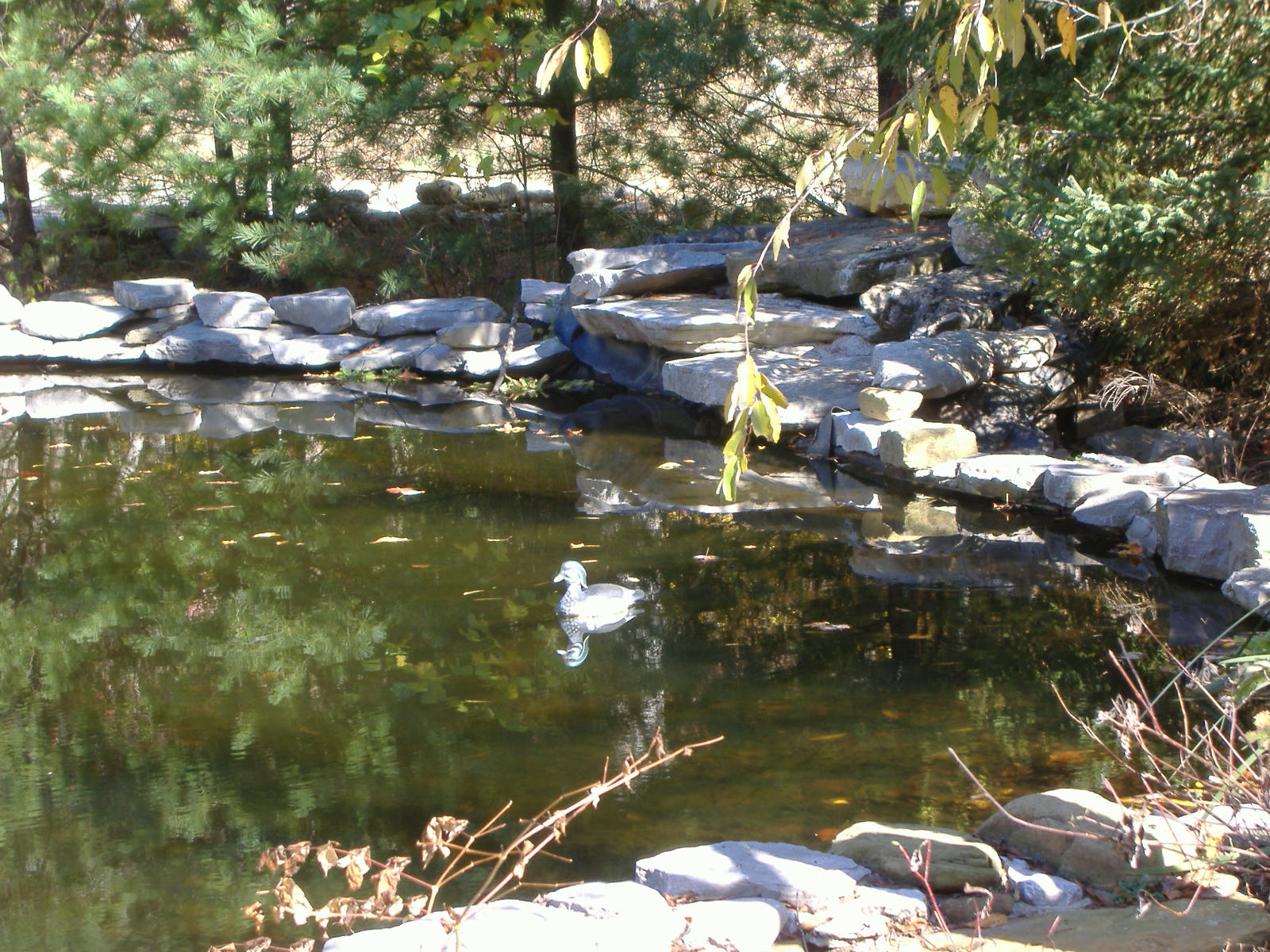
Duck pond by the O'Bannon Woods Interpretive Center
