= Wyandotte Caves =

Two caves in southern Indiana, US

- Historic Cave and Siberts Cave
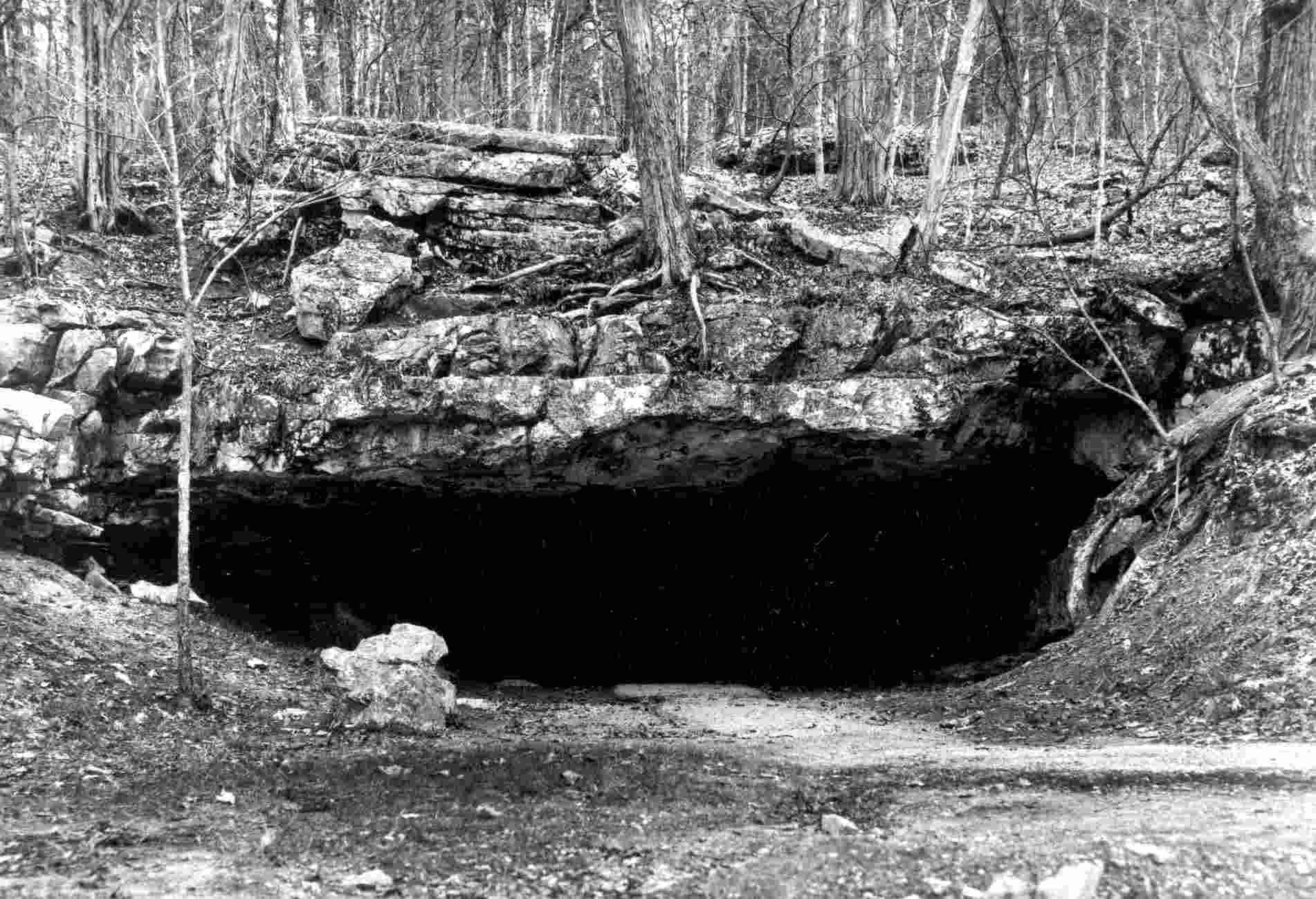
- An old photo of the entrance to Wyandotte Cave

- Location within Indiana
- Location: Wyandotte Caves 7315 S Wyandotte Cave Rd Leavenworth, IN 47137
- Nearest city: Leavenworth
- Coordinates: 38°13′41″N 86°17′46″W
- Website: www.in.gov/dnr/parklake/2976.htm

U.S. National Natural Landmark
- Designated: 1972

The Wyandotte Caves is a pair of limestone caves located on the Ohio River in Harrison–Crawford State Forest in Crawford County, Indiana, 5 miles (8 km) northeast of Leavenworth and 12 miles (19 km) from Corydon. Wyandotte Caves were designated a National Natural Landmark in 1972, and they are now part of O'Bannon Woods State Park. The cave system is the fifth largest in the state of Indiana, and it is a popular tourist attraction.

The term "Wyandotte Caves" is used to refer to Wyandotte Cave (sometimes called the "Historic Cave") and Little Wyandotte Cave (also called Siberts Cave and sometimes the "New Cave"), but while they are close geographically and owned and managed by the same entity, the two are very different from each other.

== Geological history and formations ==
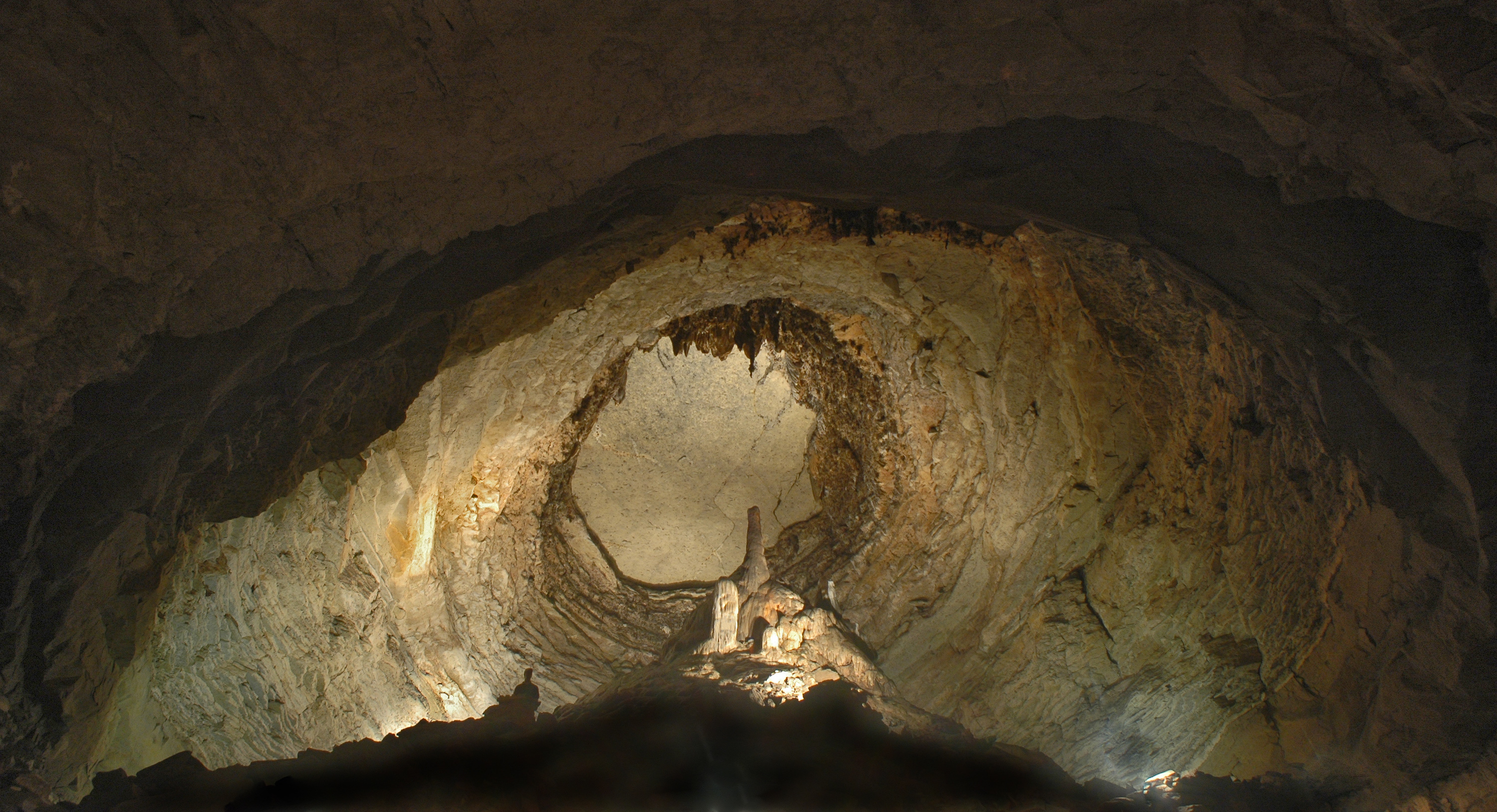
The Monument Mountain in Wyandotte Caves, Indiana, is a cluster of large stalagmites on a breakdown pile. The ceiling is a classic tension dome.

Wyandotte Caves began to form in the Pliocene Era, about 2 million years ago. Like most of Southern Indiana's caves, the caves were formed when water dissolved limestone, causing hollow caves to form.

The limestone which forms much of Southern Indiana's bedrock, and from which Wyandotte and other local caves are formed, was first deposited in the Mississippian epoch (360 Ma to 325 Ma), when Indiana was covered by a shallow inland sea.

Although the glaciers of the Pliocene and Pleistocene periods did not quite reach as far south as the area now known as Crawford County, where Wyandotte and Marengo Caves are located, they dramatically influenced the development of those caves.

The Ohio River was formed at this time, and today flows only minutes from Wyandotte Caves. The advancing and retreating glaciers destroyed the pre-existing Teays River, and the Ohio River was formed, draining the land that the Teays once drained. As the glaciers melted, the icy cold water flowing towards the Ohio River (which was then much higher than it is now) dissolved the limestone which is the bedrock for much of Southern Indiana, hollowing out caves such as Wyandotte.

The main entrance to Wyandotte Cave is 220 feet (67 m) above the level of the Blue River. Wyandotte Cave is known for its long open passageways and large rooms. With 9.2 miles (14.8 km) of passageways on five levels it is the fifth longest cave in Indiana. Included in its formations is Monument Mountain. At 135 feet (41 m) tall, Monument Mountain is considered to be the world's largest underground mountain. Wyandotte Cave is also home to a great many helictites, which are considered rare. The cave is also home to the tallest stalagmite in the world, known as the Pillar of the Constitution, but this is only visible on crawling tours.

Long speleothems, formed by rainwater dissolving calcium carbonate, abound in Siberts Cave. The cave exhibits a wide variety of speleothems including; stalactites, stalagmites, columns, flowstone, flowstone colored with iron oxide known as cave bacon, flowstone known as cave draperies, soda straws, popcorn, and rimstone dams.

The temperature inside both caves maintains a constant 52 °F (11 °C).

== History of human use ==
Wyandotte Cave was used by Native Americans for nearly 4000 years before Europeans arrived in the area; carbon dating of artifacts provided evidence of human activity potentially as far back as 8000 BC. The Native Americans used torches made of hickory bark and grape vines to light the cave where they mined for aragonite, which they used for pipes and necklaces, and chert, which they used to make stone tools. The remains of their mining explorations can be seen on tours to this day.

The discovery of Wyandotte Cave by European settlers is believed to have occurred around 1798. Shortly thereafter Wyandotte Cave became known as an excellent source of saltpeter, an integral component of gunpowder, and of Epsom salts, which have medical uses. Saltpeter mining in the cave reached a peak under a man by the name of Dr. Benjamin Adams during the War of 1812. Modern tours feature Dr. Adams' vats and hoppers, and point out where magnesium sulfate (the chemical name of Epsom salt) is visible as a glittery substance lining the cave walls. The cave was also used to store supplies for the army of William Henry Harrison.

Wyandotte Cave was named by Governor David Wallace after the river which was then known as the Wyandotte, but which is currently known as the Blue River. Before receiving its current name it was variously called the Mammoth Cave of Indiana, the Epsom Salts Cave, and the Indiana Saltpetre Cave.

The land beneath which the caves are located was bought by Henry Peter Rothrock in 1819. The Rothrocks seemed to have had little to do with the cave until 1850, when they offered the first commercial tours of the cave after the discovery of a large new section of cavern. This date of 1850 makes Wyandotte cave the fourth oldest commercial cave in the United States. Siberts Cave was discovered in 1851 and named after the person who discovered it.

The caves were sold to the Department of Natural Resources, Division of Forestry in 1966, along with 1,174 acres (4.75 km^{2}) of woodland.

The caves were closed to visitation from 2009 to 2016 in order to slow the spread of white-nose syndrome affecting the bat population. After eight years, the agencies studying the bats gave the "okay" to open up the caves, as long as "decontamination stations" were walked through at the end of each tour. The eight-year closure of the caves drastically affected the buildings on site, and many were taken down due to structural damage. State Representative Lloyd Arnold (R-74) and Lieutenant Governor Eric Holcomb showcased the $1.7 million project to replace the main building on-site and re-wire the interior of the cave. As of 2018, the lights in the cave have been repaired and replaced and a temporary gatehouse has been built.

== Cave Tours (2018) ==
=== Little Wyandotte Cave ===
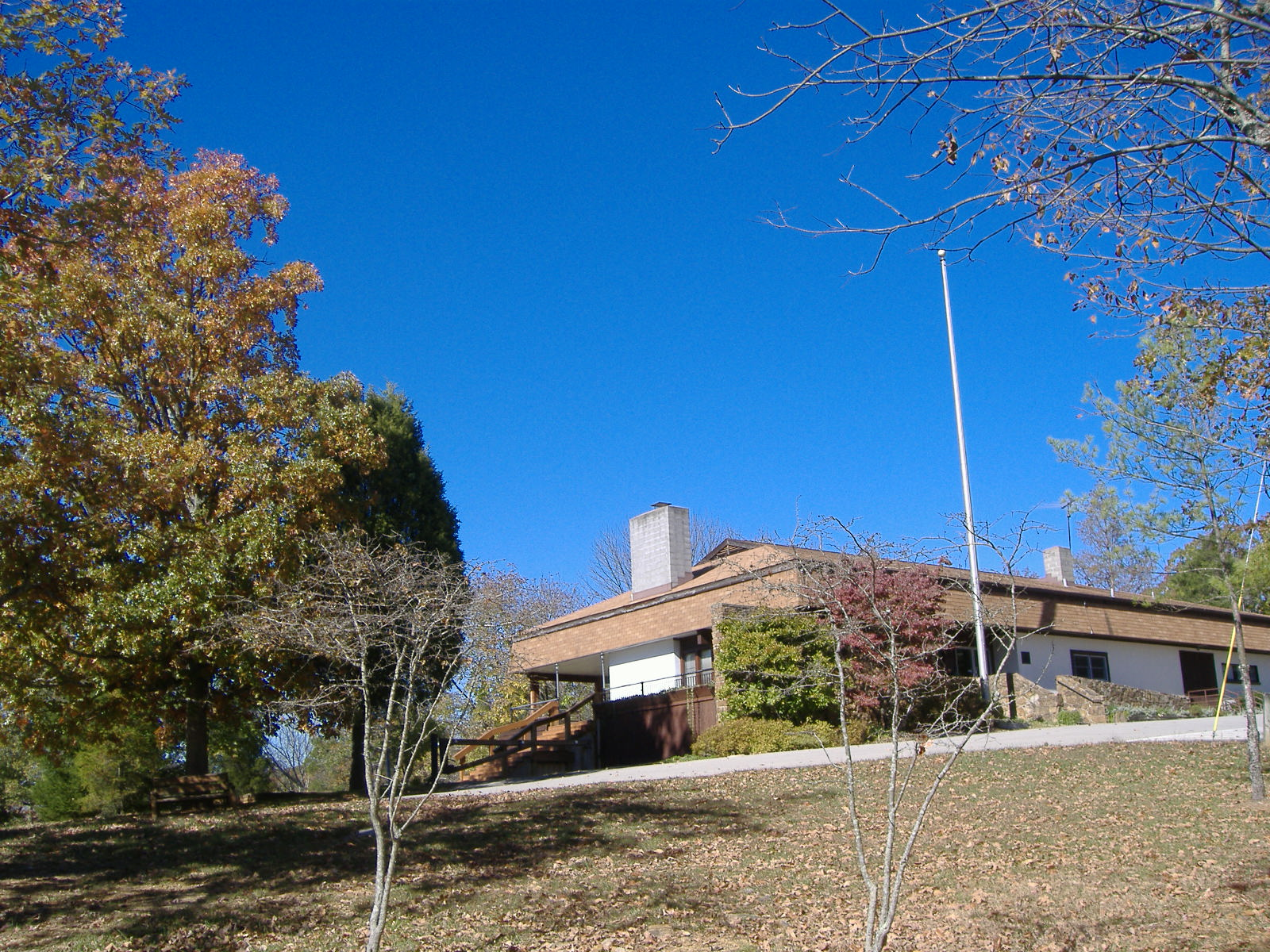
Wyandotte Cave Visitor Center (removed pre-2016)

Little Wyandotte Cave is entirely separate from Big Wyandotte Cave and contains many flowstone and dripstone formations. The park tour of this cave, open to all ages and 30–45 minutes long, involves no long stairways and is considered the least difficult of tours offered at Wyandotte Caves.

=== Big Wyandotte Cave ===
A demanding 2 hour/1.5 miles (2.4 km) tour deep into Big Wyandotte Cave allows visitors to see the rare formations called helictites, gypsum, epsomite, prehistoric flint quarries, and a formation called "Monument Mountain".

== Cave life ==
Both Wyandotte Caves are believed to home more than 20 known animal species, including bats, cave salamanders, crayfish, and crickets. Bones of larger wildlife have also been found in both caves.

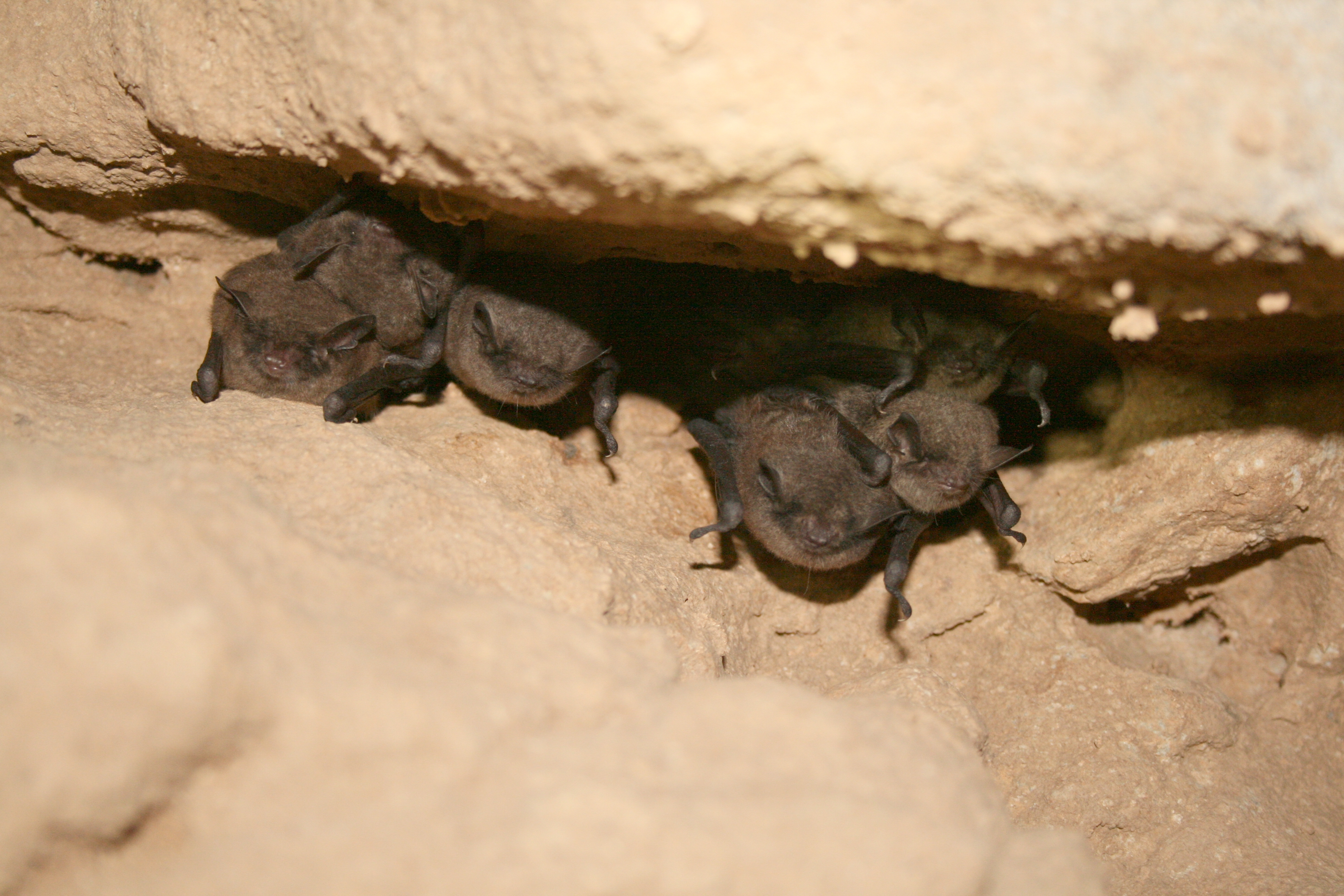
Cluster of Endangered Indiana bats

=== Bats ===
Indiana is home to 12 native species of bats. Wyandotte Cave is occupied by members of nine of those 12 species; the total bat population is over 30,000. The most common bat in the cave is the endangered Myotis sodalis (commonly known as the Indiana bat), followed by the Myotis lucifugus (commonly known as the little brown bat).

Little Wyandotte cave rarely gets bats, as the only entrance to that cave is less than 200 years old, and humans have been present in that cave on a regular basis since it first opened. However, the occasional adventurous bat will venture in.

The presence of hibernating bats in the winter is the main reason that the caves are closed to the public from the first of November until February 28. Bats can occasionally be seen by the lucky visitor during the rest of the year, but they are far less numerous and less likely to be disturbed in the warmer months.

=== Salamanders ===
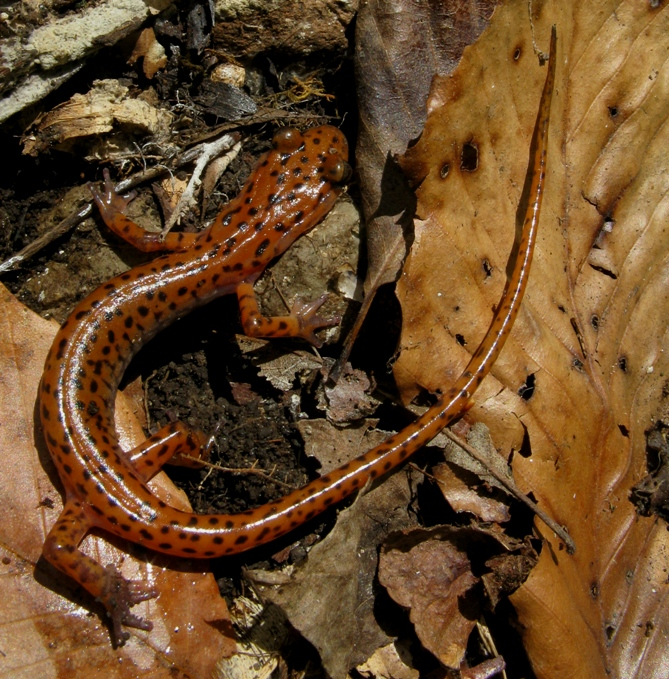
Cave salamander commonly found around Wyandotte Caves

Cave salamanders can often be seen in the entrance area of Wyandotte cave and inside of Little Wyandotte Cave.

=== Fish ===
Blind cavefish are rarely seen in the larger of Wyandotte Caves, as it is very dry in modern times. Little Wyandotte Cave, however, is much wetter than the historic cave, but still contains no fish. The only living aquatic life found is bacteria.

=== Crickets ===
Cave crickets abound in the smaller cave, and some occasionally enter the larger cave. They are often eaten by snakes.

== Gallery ==
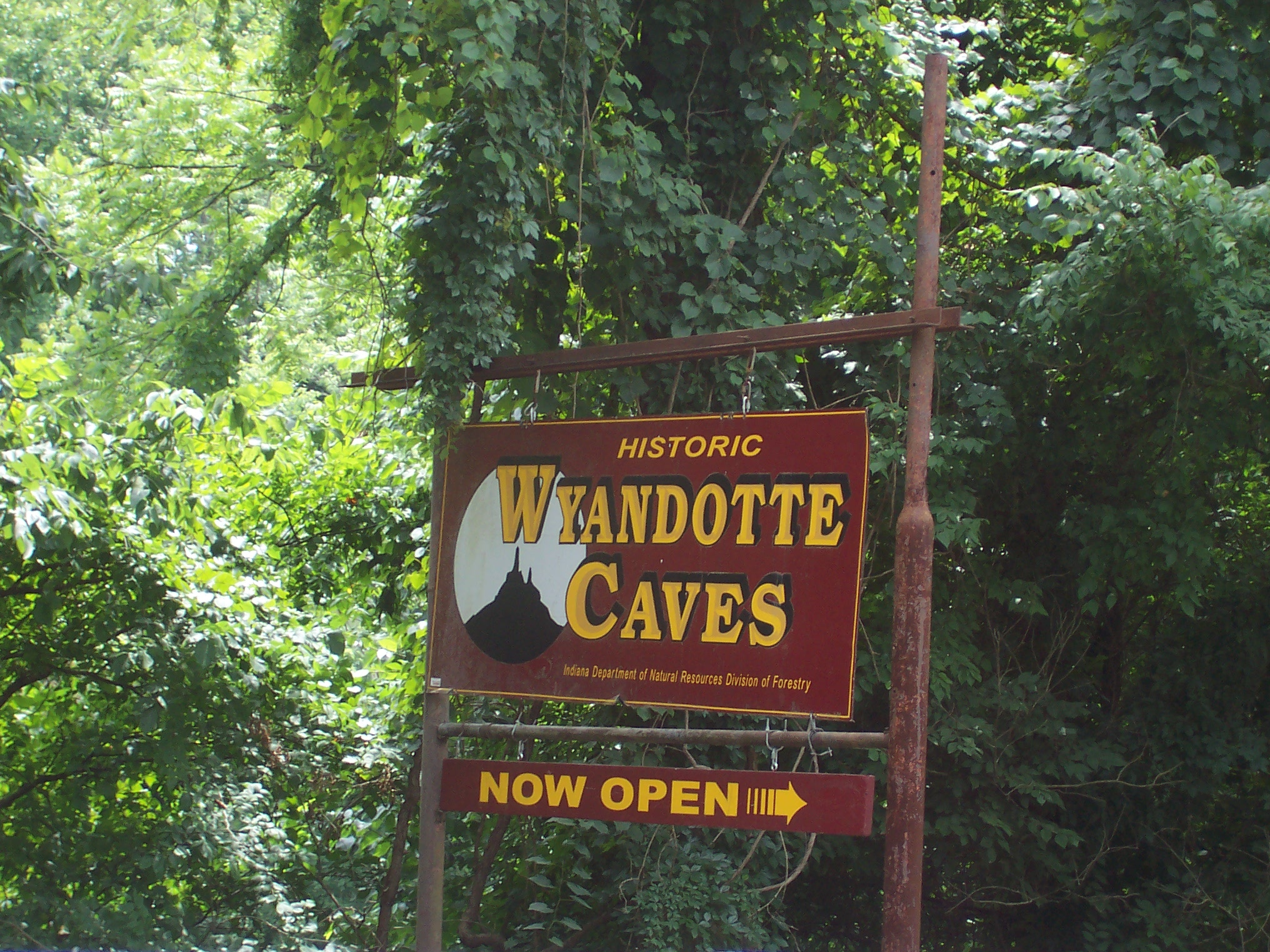
Park Entrance

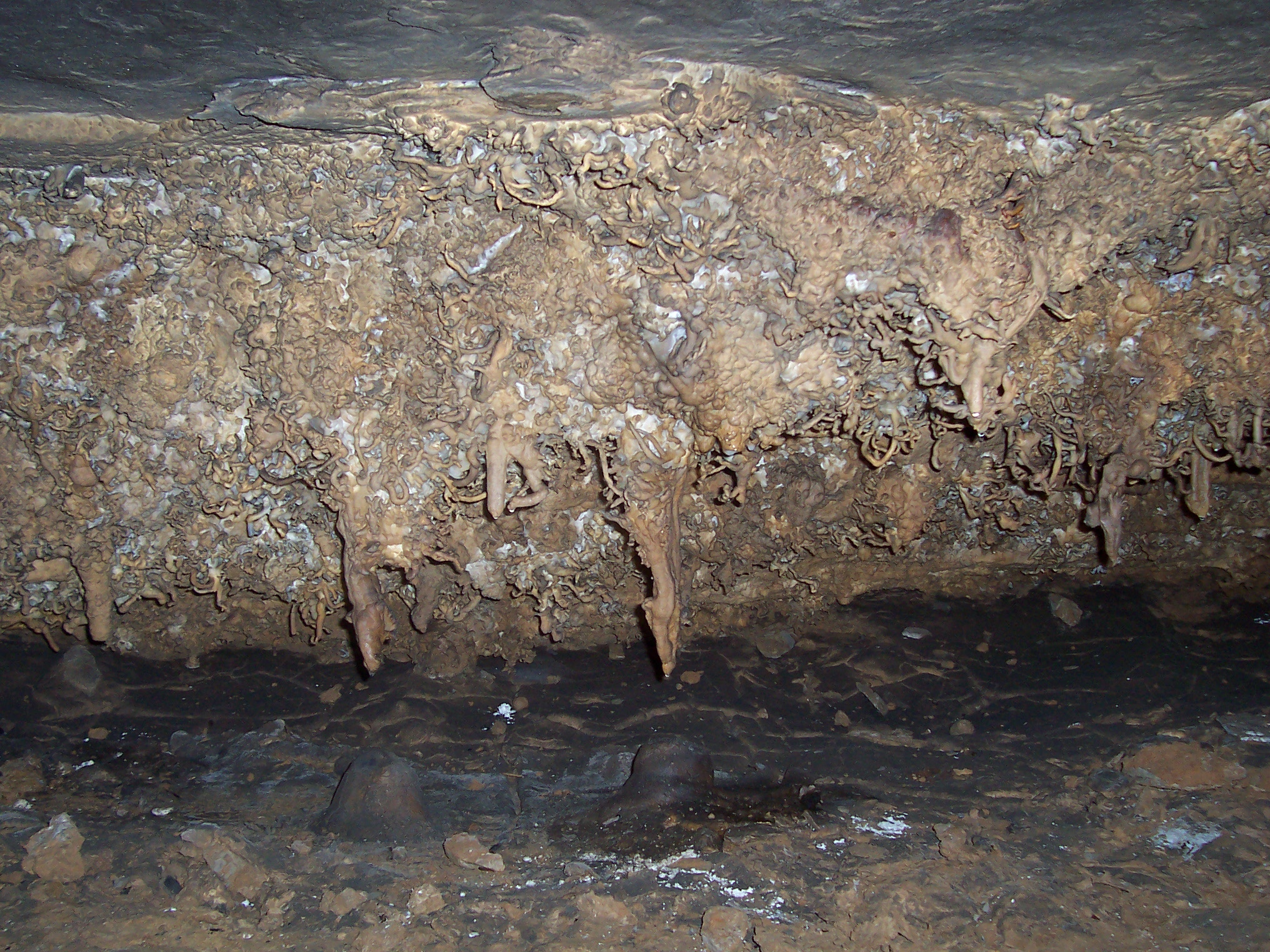
Rare helictite formations

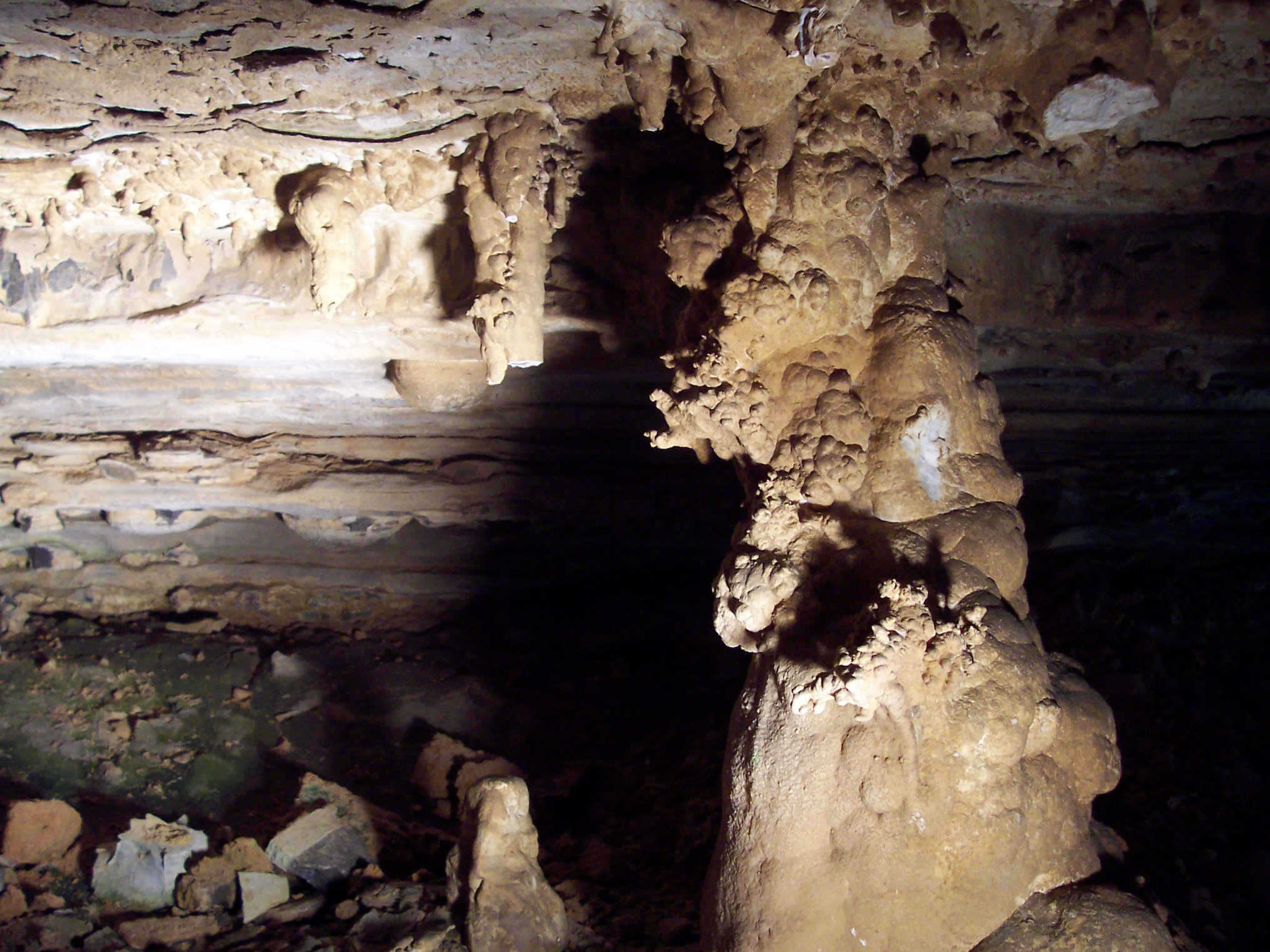
Column formation

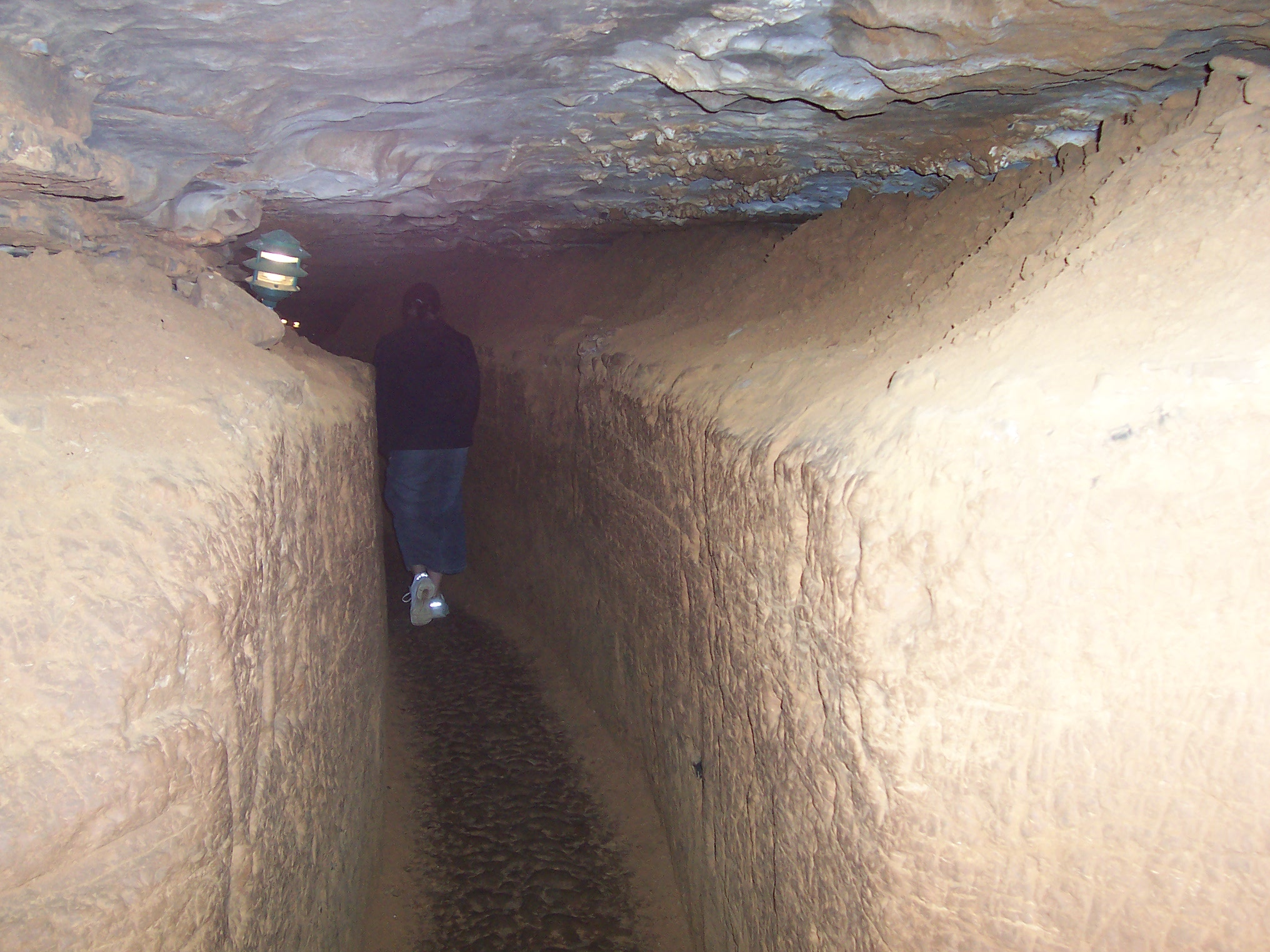
Narrow passageway in the cave

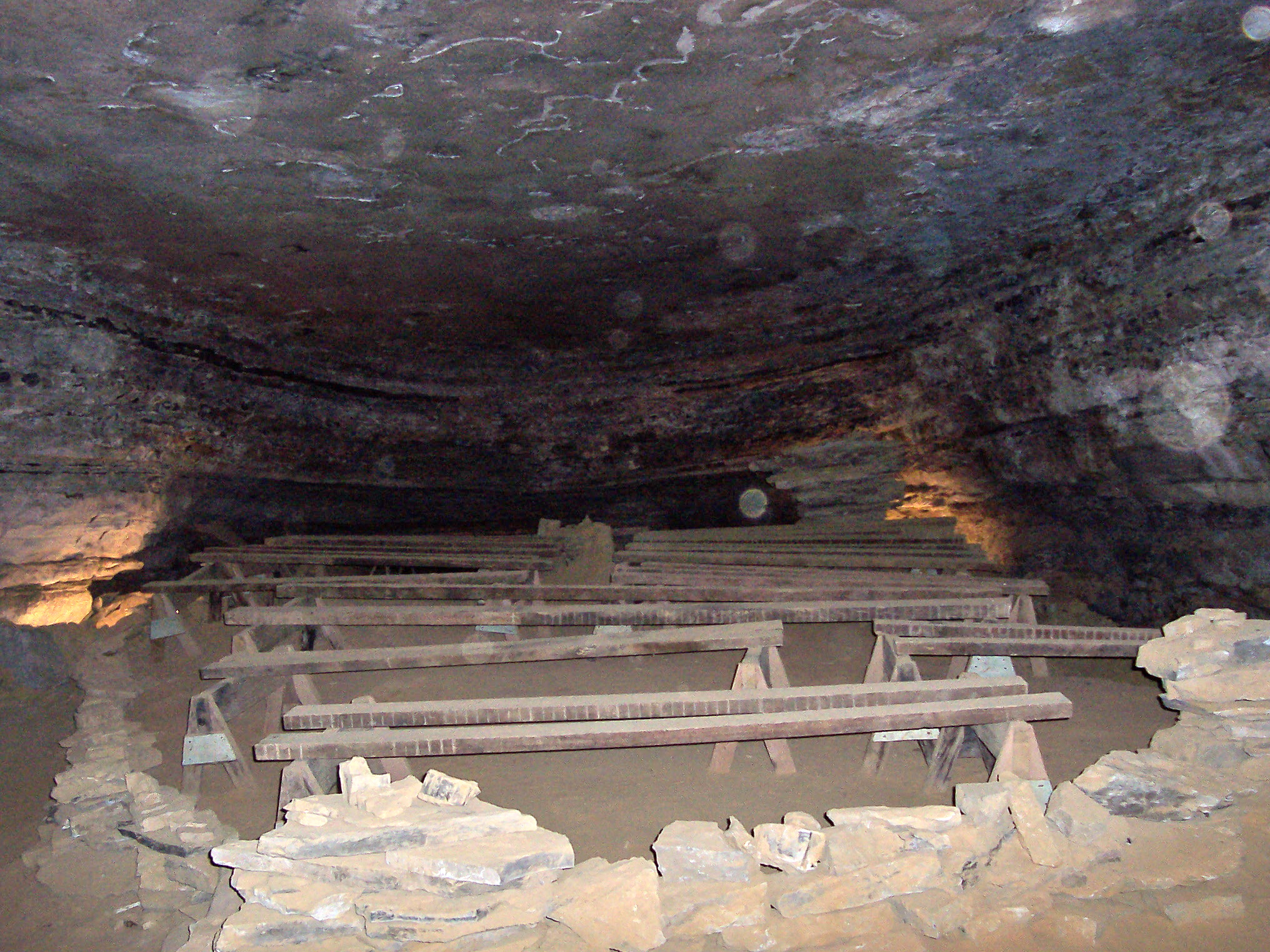
An Oddfellows meeting hall, used in the mid-1800s

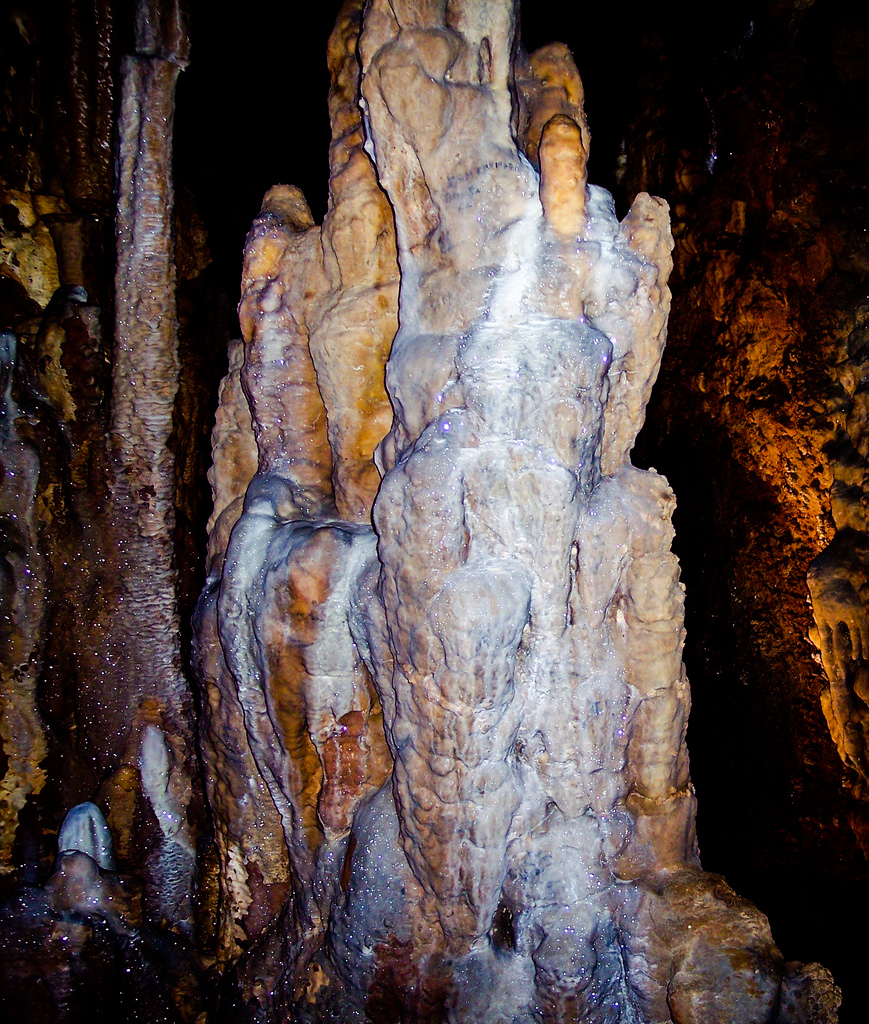
Wyandotte Cave stalagmite
