= Orangeville, Orange County, Indiana =

Orangeville
- Unincorporated community
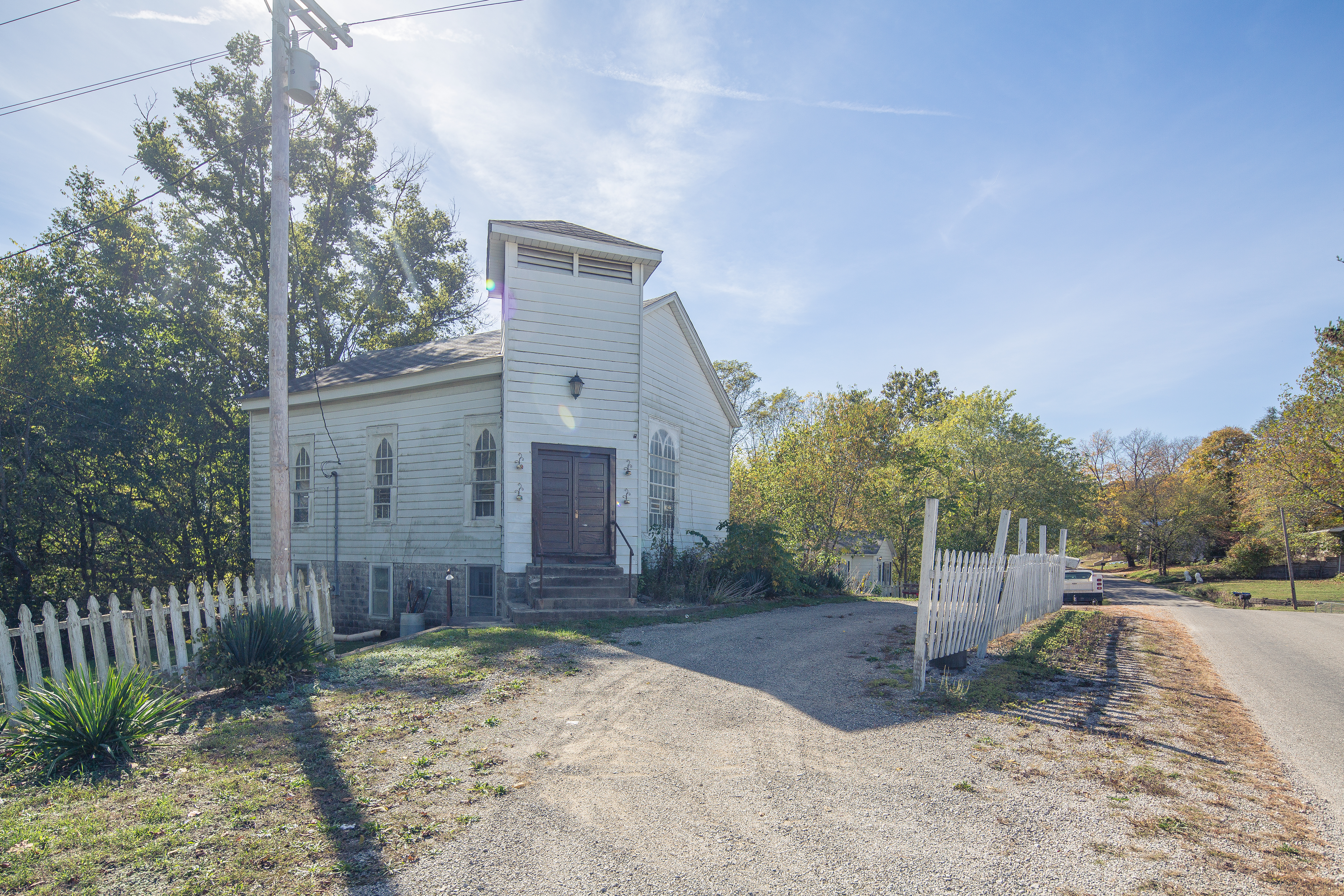

- Location within Indiana Location within the United States
- Coordinates: 38°37′53″N 86°33′24″W
- Country: United States
- State: Indiana
- County: Orange
- Township: Orangeville
- Elevation: 522 ft (159 m)
- Time zone: UTC-5 (Eastern (EST))
  - Summer (DST): UTC-4 (EDT)
- ZIP code: 47452
- Area codes: 812, 930
- GNIS feature ID: 451304

Orangeville is an unincorporated community in Orangeville Township, Orange County, in the U.S. state of Indiana.

== History ==
Orangeville was laid out in 1849. The community took its name from Orange County. A post office was established at Orangeville in 1849, and remained in operation until it was discontinued in 1907.
