= Orangeville Township, Orange County, Indiana =

Orangeville Township
- Township
- Location in Orange County
- Coordinates: 38°38′14″N 86°33′13″W
- Country: United States
- State: Indiana
- County: Orange

Government
  - Type: Indiana township

Area
  - Total: 28.11 sq mi (72.8 km^{2})
  - Land: 28.01 sq mi (72.5 km^{2})
  - Water: 0.1 sq mi (0.26 km^{2}) 0.36%
- Elevation: 522 ft (159 m)

Population (2020)
  - Total: 726
  - Density: 25.9/sq mi (10.0/km^{2})
- Time zone: UTC-5 (Eastern (EST))
  - Summer (DST): UTC-4 (EDT)
- ZIP codes: 47452, 47454, 47469
- Area codes: 812, 930
- GNIS feature ID: 453692

Orangeville Township is one of ten townships in Orange County, Indiana, United States. As of the 2020 census, its population was 726 and it contained 275 housing units.

Historical population
Census	Pop.	Note	%±
1890	749		—
1900	739		−1.3%
1910	665		−10.0%
1920	626		−5.9%
1930	628		0.3%
1940	635		1.1%
1950	583		−8.2%
1960	517		−11.3%
1970	463		−10.4%
1980	521		12.5%
1990	559		7.3%
2000	613		9.7%
2010	658		7.3%
2020	726		10.3%
Source: US Decennial Census

== Geography ==
According to the 2010 census, the township has a total area of 28.11 square miles (72.8 km^{2}), of which 28.01 square miles (72.5 km^{2}) (or 99.64%) is land and 0.1 square miles (0.26 km^{2}) (or 0.36%) is water.

=== Unincorporated towns ===
- Orangeville at 38.631442°N 86.556658°W

(This list is based on USGS data and may include former settlements.)

=== Cemeteries ===
The township contains Independent Order of Odd Fellows Cemetery.

== School districts ==
- Orleans Community Schools

== Political districts ==
- Indiana's 9th congressional district
- State House District 62
- State Senate District 48
