= Northland Conference (IHSAA) =

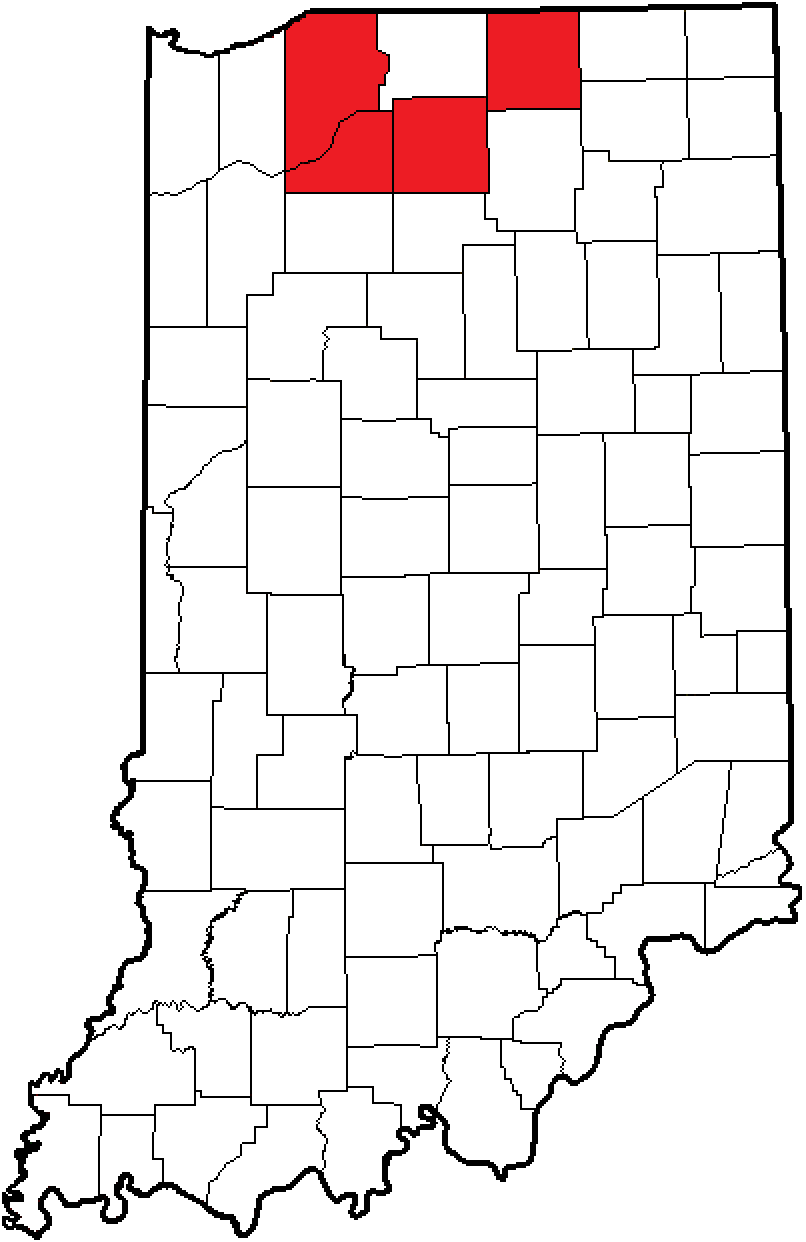
The Northland Conference within Indiana

The Northland Conference was an IHSAA-sanctioned conference in Northern Indiana. The conference formed in 1998 with six schools, and disbanded in 2008, after two schools left to join the Greater South Shore Conference.

== History ==
The conference formed in 1998, when Westville left the Porter County Conference to join with four independents: Argos, Michigan City Marquette, Oregon-Davis and South Central (Union Mills), and River Forest, which previously competed in the defunct Northwest Hoosier Conference. South Central left for the Porter County Conference after the 2002–03 school year, and was replaced for the 2004–05 season by Elkhart Christian. The conference shrank to four members when Marquette and River Forest left to co-found the Greater South Shore Conference after the 2006–07 school year. Unable to find suitable replacements, the remaining schools decided to disband the conference after the 2007–08 school year.

== Membership ==
School	Location	Mascot	Colors	County	Year joined	Previous conference	Year left	Conference joined
Argos	Argos	Dragons		50; Marshall	1998	Independents (MCC 1966)	2008	Independents
Marquette Catholic	Michigan City	Blazers		46; LaPorte	1998	Independents (SLMC 1975)	2007	Greater; South Shore
Oregon-Davis	Hamlet	Bobcats		75; Starke	1998	Independents (SLMC 1975)	2008	Independents
River Forest	Lake Station	Ingots		45; Lake	1998	Northwest Hoosier	2007	Greater; South Shore
South Central (Union Mills)	Union Mills	Satellites		46; La Porte	1998	Independents (SLMC 1975)	2003	Porter County
Westville	Westville	Blackhawks		46; La Porte	1998	Porter County	2008	Independents (PCC 2015)
Elkhart; Christian	Elkhart	Eagles		20; Elkhart	2004	new IHSAA school	2008	Independents

== Resources ==
- IHSAA Conferences
- IHSAA Directory
