= South Central High School =

South Central High School may refer to:

- South Central High School, South Central School District 401, Farina, Illinois
- South Central USD 300, Coldwater, Kansas
- South Central High School (North Carolina), Winterville, North Carolina
- South Central High School (Ohio), Greenwich, Ohio
- South Central Alternative School, Bismarck, North Dakota
- South Central Career Center, West Plains, Missouri
- South Central Junior & Senior High School, Elizabeth, Indiana
- South Central Junior-Senior High School, Union Mills, Indiana
