= Indiana State Road 211 =

State highway in Indiana, United States

State Road 211
- SR 211 highlighted in red

Route information
- Maintained by INDOT
- Length: 2.031 mi (3.269 km)

Major junctions
- West end: SR 11 in Posey Township
- East end: SR 111 in Posey Township

Location
- Country: United States
- State: Indiana
- Counties: Harrison

Highway system
- Indiana State Highway System; Interstate; US; State; Scenic
← SR 205	→ SR 212

State Road 211 is a short east–west connector route in southeast Harrison County in the U.S. state of Indiana.

== Route description ==
State Road 211 begins at an intersection with State Road 11 northeast of the town of Elizabeth. SR 211 proceeds east through a rural portion of Posey Township, soon turning southeast and winding down a hill, the route reaches a junction with State Road 111 in Sugar Grove, which marks the eastern terminus of the route, just 2.04 miles (3.28 km) east of where it started. The terminus is a short distance away from the Ohio River.

No section of SR 211 is listed on the National Highway System, a system of routes determined to be the most important for the nation's economy, mobility and defense. The highway is maintained by the Indiana Department of Transportation (INDOT) like all other state roads in the state. The department tracks the traffic volumes along all state highways as a part of its maintenance responsibilities using a metric called average annual daily traffic (AADT). This measurement is a calculation of the traffic level along a segment of roadway for any average day of the year. In 2010, INDOT figured that the traffic levels present on SR 211 were 2,490 vehicles and 60 commercial vehicles daily.

== Major intersections ==
The entire route is in Posey Township, Harrison County.

mi	km	Destinations	Notes
0.000	0.000	SR 11	Western terminus of SR 211
2.031	3.269	SR 111	Eastern terminus of SR 211
1.000 mi = 1.609 km; 1.000 km = 0.621 mi
