= South Lake Michigan Conference =

The South Lake Michigan Conference was an IHSAA-sanctioned conference situated in LaPorte and Starke counties. Started in 1907 as the LaPorte County Conference, the county had only five non-city schools left by 1965. The league then decided to rebrand itself as the SLMC and add Michigan City Marquette and Oregon-Davis. However, continuing consolidation would leave the league unstable, and the conference was back down to five schools by 1969. The end came when two of those schools joined the Porter County Conference, leaving the three remaining schools to become independents.

The league can be considered a predecessor to the Northland Conference, which was started 23 years later by four of the five SLMC members at the time of its disbanding. That conference was also plagued by a lack of stability, and folded in 2010.

== Members ==
School	Location	Mascot	Colors	County	Year joined	Previous conference	Year left	Conference joined
Clinton Township	Wanatah	Trojans		46; LaPorte	1907	Independents	1962	none (consolidated into South Central (UM))
Hanna	Hanna	Fishermen		46; LaPorte	1907	Independents	1962	none (consolidated into South Central (UM))
Kingsbury	Kingsbury	Kings		46; LaPorte	1907	Independents	1964	none (consolidated into LaPorte)
LaCrosse^{1}	LaCrosse	Tigers		46; LaPorte	1907	Independents	1975	Porter County
Mill Creek	Mill Creek	Creekers		46; LaPorte	1907	Independents	1964	none (consolidated into LaPorte)
Rolling Prairie	Rolling Prairie	Bulldogs		46; LaPorte	1907	Independents	1968	none (consolidated into New Prairie)
Springfield Township	Michiana Shores	Indians		46; LaPorte	1907	Independents	1950	none (consolidated into Michigan City)
Stillwell	Stillwell	Vikings		46; LaPorte	1907	Independents	1964	none (consolidated into LaPorte)
Union Mills	Union Mills	Millers		46; LaPorte	1907	Independents	1962	none (consolidated into South Central (UM))
Union Township	South Center	Tigers		46; LaPorte	1907	Independents	1965	none (consolidated into LaPorte)
Wanatah	Wanatah	Midgets		46; LaPorte	1907	Independents	1969	none (consolidated into LaCrosse
Westville	Westville	Blackhawks		46; LaPorte	1907	Independents	1975	Porter County
South Central (Union Mills)	Union Mills	Satellites		46; LaPorte	1962	none (new school)	1975	Independents (NLC 1998)
Marquette Catholic	Michigan City	Blazers		46; LaPorte	1965	Independents (joined IHSAA 1942)	1975	Independents (NLC 1998)
Oregon-Davis^{2}	Hamlet	Bobcats		75; Starke	1965	Tippecanoe Valley	1975	Independents (NLC 1998)

1. Played concurrently in LCC and Kankakee Valley Conference 1943–49.
2. Played concurrently in SLMC and TVAC 1965–67.

== Resources ==
E.T. Pearl's Basketball Corner
