= Sean Manaea =

American baseball player (born 1992)

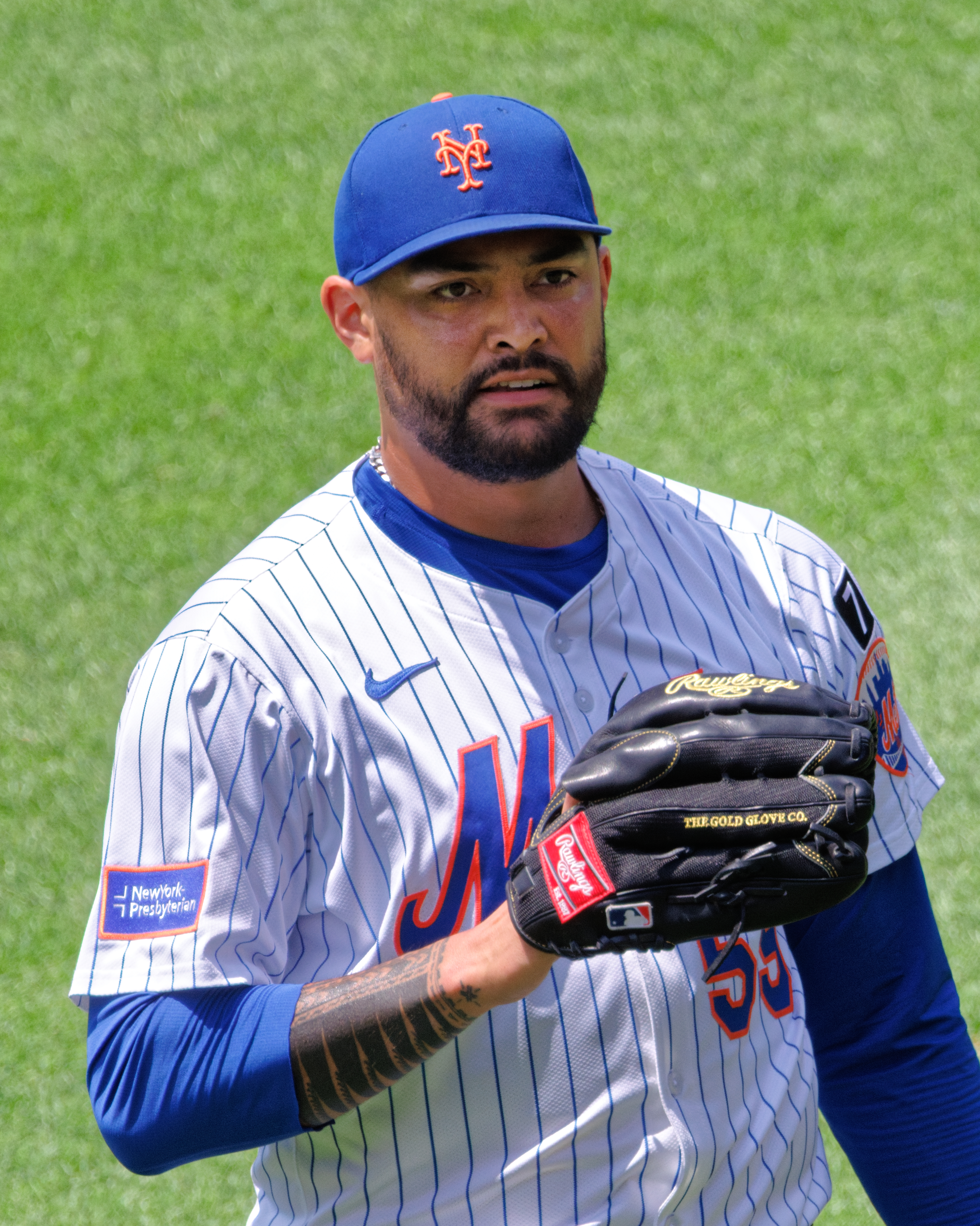
- Manaea with the Mets in 2025

New York Mets – No. 59
- Pitcher
- Born: February 1, 1992 (age 34); Valparaiso, Indiana, U.S.
- Bats: Right Throws: Left

MLB debut
- April 29, 2016, for the Oakland Athletics

MLB statistics (through 2026 season)
- Win–loss record: 85–74
- Earned run average: 4.16
- Strikeouts: 1,328
- Stats at Baseball Reference

Teams
- Oakland Athletics (2016–2021); San Diego Padres (2022); San Francisco Giants (2023); New York Mets (2024–present)

Career highlights and awards
- Pitched a no-hitter on April 21, 2018

Sean Anthony Manaea (/məˈnaɪə/ mə-NY-ə; born February 1, 1992) is an American professional baseball pitcher for the New York Mets of Major League Baseball (MLB). He has previously played in MLB for the Oakland Athletics, San Diego Padres, and San Francisco Giants. Manaea played college baseball for the Indiana State Sycamores. He made his MLB debut in 2016 with the Athletics.

While attending Indiana State, Manaea was named the best prospect in the Cape Cod Baseball League in 2012. The Kansas City Royals selected Manaea with the 34th pick in the 2013 MLB draft, and traded him to the Athletics during the 2015 season. He debuted in MLB in 2016, and pitched a no-hitter on April 21, 2018. Oakland traded Manaea to the Padres before the 2022 season, and he signed with the Giants for the 2023 season. After opting out of his contract and becoming a free agent, Manaea signed with the Mets for the 2024 season. He opted out again after the season, and re-signed with the Mets on a three-year contract.

== Amateur career ==
Manaea was raised in Wanatah, Indiana, a town with a population of 1,000. He attended South Central Junior-Senior High School in Union Mills, Indiana, for his first three years of high school. After his junior year, he competed in the first All-Indiana Crossroads Showcase Series. Manaea transferred to Andrean High School in Merrillville, Indiana. Playing for the baseball team at Andrean, Manaea was part of the state champions in 2010, his senior year. He threw a fastball between 82–85 miles per hour (132–137 km/h).

Not selected in the Major League Baseball (MLB) draft out of high school, Manaea enrolled at Indiana State University (ISU), where he played college baseball for the Indiana State Sycamores baseball team, competing in the Missouri Valley Conference of NCAA's Division I. After his freshman year at ISU, Manaea played collegiate summer baseball for the Dubois County Bombers of the Prospect League. Manaea was 5–3 with a 3.34 ERA and recorded 115 strikeouts (13th in the nation) in 105 innings pitched for the Sycamores as a sophomore.

Following his sophomore year at Indiana State, he competed for the Hyannis Harbor Hawks in the Cape Cod Baseball League, where he went 5–1 with a 1.22 earned run average (ERA) and a league-leading 85 strikeouts (setting the modern record for a single summer) in 51 2/3 innings pitched, and won the league's Outstanding Prospect Award, and was named the B.F.C Whitehouse Top Pitcher, Summer National Player of the Year by Perfect Game USA, and the Cape Cod League's top prospect by Baseball America. In 2013, Manaea was named a Preseason All-American and added to the National Pitcher of the Year Watch List. He compiled a 5–4 record, a 1.47 ERA, and 93 strikeouts in 73 1/3 innings, ranking fourth in the nation in strikeouts per 9 innings pitched (11.4), while leading the league with 5 balks. By the end of his collegiate career, his fastball reached as high as 97 miles per hour (156 km/h).

== Professional career ==
=== Kansas City Royals ===
Considered a top prospect in the 2013 Major League Baseball draft, Manaea was scouted by the Houston Astros, who had the first overall pick. However, he had a hip injury that he pitched through during his junior year at Indiana State. Misdiagnosed as a hip impingement that he could play through as it healed, Manaea pitched through pain and saw his velocity decrease. He was not selected until the Kansas City Royals took him with the 34th pick of the draft. The Royals signed Manaea to a $3.55 million signing bonus, above the recommended value for the 34th pick of $1,623,000. He had surgery to repair a torn acetabular labrum in his hip and missed the remainder of the 2013 season.

With Manaea healthy in time for spring training in 2014, the Royals assigned him to the Wilmington Blue Rocks of the High-A Carolina League, with the plan to limit him to 150 innings pitched for the 2014 season. Manaea had a 7–8 record with a 3.11 ERA in 25 games started, leading the Carolina League with 146 strikeouts in 121 2/3 innings (10.8 strikeouts per 9 innings). He was named an MiLB Organization 2014 All Star.

He missed the beginning of the 2015 season with abdominal and groin injuries. After making four starts for Wilmington, Manaea received a promotion to the Northwest Arkansas Naturals of the Double-A Texas League in July, for whom he pitched seven innings.

=== Oakland Athletics ===
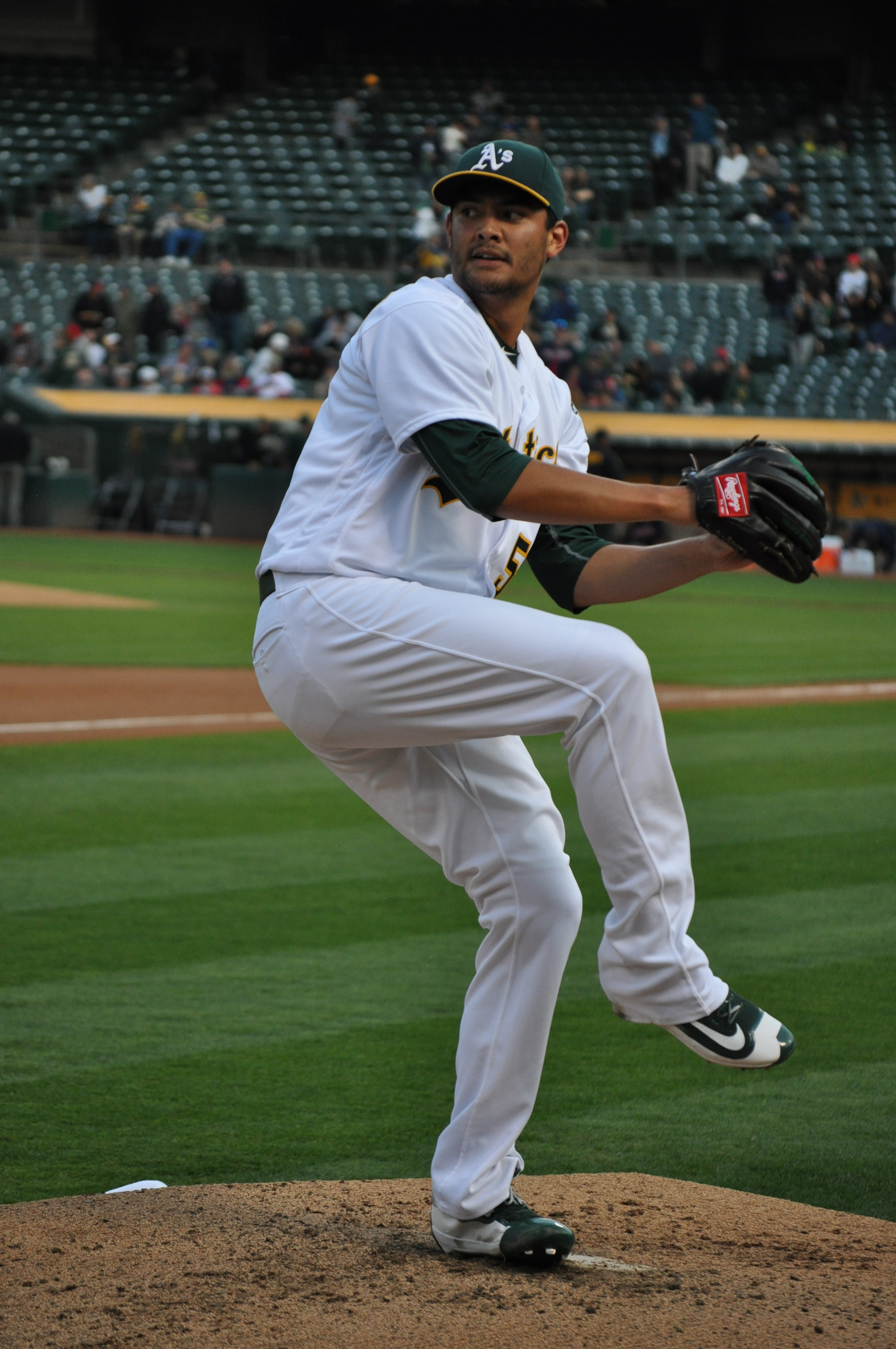
Manaea with the Athletics in 2016

The Royals traded Manaea and Aaron Brooks to the Oakland Athletics on July 28, 2015, in exchange for Ben Zobrist. The Athletics assigned him to the Midland RockHounds of the Texas League. With Midland, Manaea made seven starts, and had a 1.90 ERA with 51 strikeouts in 42 2/3 innings pitched. He was named an MiLB Organization 2015 All Star. Pitching for the Mesa Solar Sox in 2015, he was named an AFL Rising Star and to the AFL All-Prospect Team.

He began the 2016 season with the Nashville Sounds of the Triple-A Pacific Coast League.

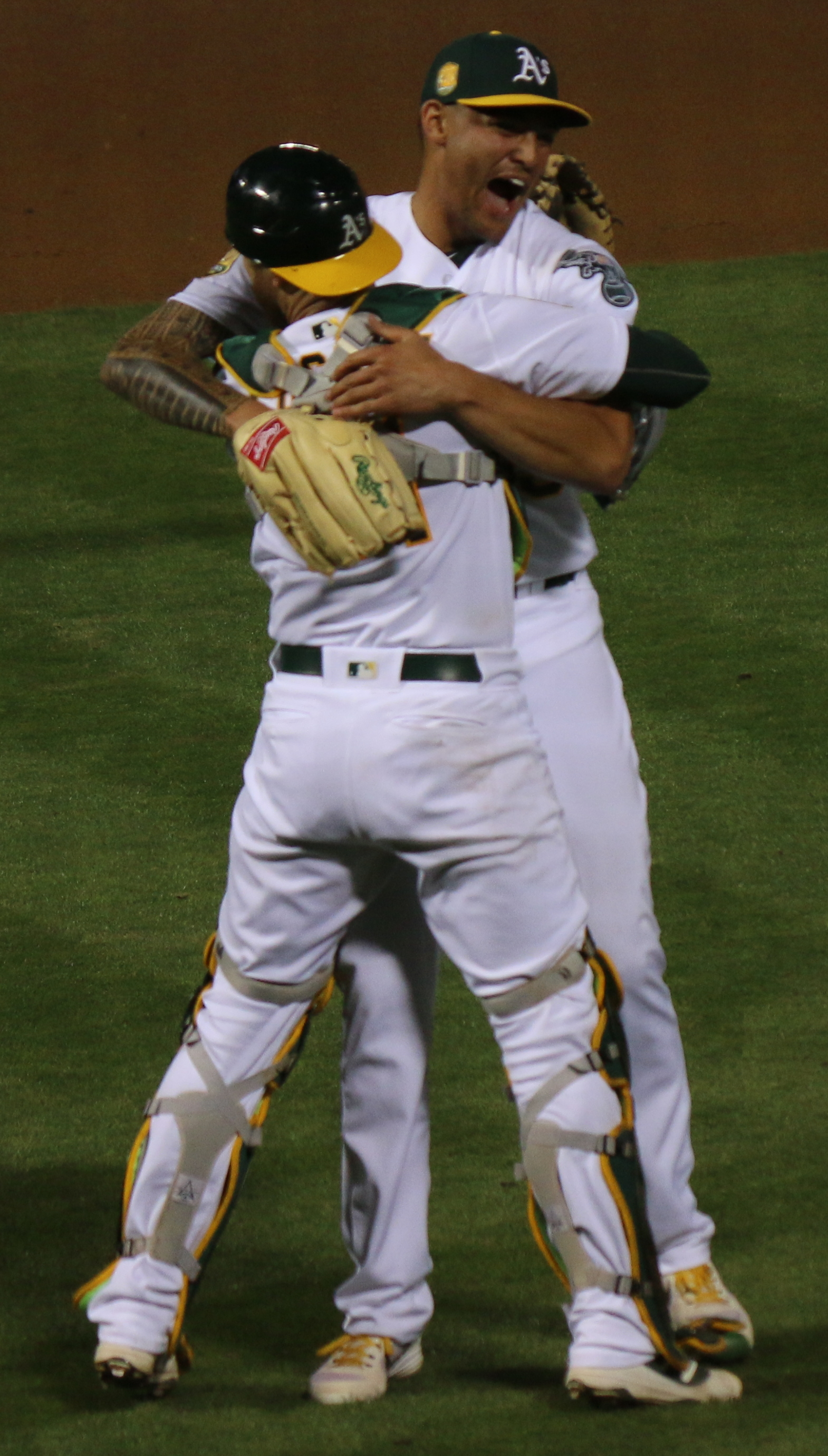
Manaea and Jonathan Lucroy celebrating Manaea's no hitter on April 21, 2018

After he made three starts for Nashville, with whom he was 2–0 with a 1.50 ERA in 18 innings with 21 strikeouts, the Athletics promoted Manaea to the major leagues to make his debut on April 29. In his rookie season in 2016, Manaea pitched to a 7–9 win–loss record and a 3.86 ERA in 25 games (24 starts) covering 144 2/3 innings. Manaea was placed on the 10-day disabled list due to a left shoulder strain on April 30, 2017.

Manaea completed his 16th consecutive outing in which he pitched at least two innings allowing no more than five hits on June 5. Manaea surpassed Tom Gordon's streak of 15 games (June 24 – September 2, 1992), becoming the longest such streak by an American League (AL) pitcher since 1913. In 16 starts prior to the All-Star break, Manaea had a 3.76 ERA. He struggled with weight loss during the season due to changing dosage of an attention deficit hyperactivity disorder medication he was prescribed in the spring, going from 255 to 230 pounds (116 to 104 kg). He ended the 2017 season with a 12–10 record and a 4.37 ERA in 29 starts covering 158 2/3 innings.

On April 21, 2018, Manaea no-hit the Boston Red Sox 3–0 at Oakland-Alameda County Coliseum, becoming the first Athletics pitcher to throw a no-hitter since Dallas Braden's perfect game in 2010. He struck out 10 and walked two. With a .894 winning percentage, the Red Sox had the best record, at the time, of any team to be no-hit in baseball history. Manaea and Manny Machado were named the AL's Co-Players of the Week for the week ending April 22. In his next start against the Houston Astros on April 27, Manaea pitched seven scoreless innings and struck out seven as the A's won 8–1. In August, Manaea went on the disabled list due to an impingement in his left shoulder. On September 11, he was ruled out for the rest of the season due to arthroscopic surgery to repair the impingement. He ended the 2018 season with a 12–9 record in 27 starts covering 160 2/3 innings in which he averaged 7.9 hits and 1.8 walks per 9 innings, with a 1.077 WHIP, and his 9 wild pitches were 10th in the AL. He tied for the major league lead in bunt hits given up, with six.

Manaea began the 2019 season rehabilitating his shoulder, aiming to return to the Athletics at midseason. He made his season debut in September. In five starts, he was 4–0 with 30 strikeouts in 29 2/3 innings. Earning the start in the 2019 AL Wild Card Game against the Tampa Bay Rays. He allowed four runs on four hits, including three home runs, despite striking out five, leading to his exit after two-plus innings in an eventual 5–1 Oakland loss.

In 2020, Manaea and the Athletics agreed to a $3.75 million salary. He finished the pandemic-shortened season with a record of 4–3 and a 4.50 ERA in 11 starts covering 54 innings. As Oakland advanced in the playoffs, Manaea pitched against the Houston Astros in Game 2 of the 2020 American League Division Series. He took the loss as he allowed four runs in 4 1/3 innings.

Manaea and the Athletics agreed on a $5.95 million salary for the 2021 season. He led the AL with 32 starts and two shutouts for the Athletics in 2021, and went 11–10 with a 3.91 ERA (10th in the AL) with 194 strikeouts (8th) in 179 2/3 innings (8th), with 4.732 strikeouts/walk (4th), 2.058 walks per 9 innings (6th), 9.736 strikeouts per 9 innings (7th), 8.983 hits per 9 innings (9th), 1.255 home runs/9 innings (9th), and a 1.227 WHIP (10th). On March 22, 2022, Manaea signed a $9.75 million contract with Oakland, avoiding salary arbitration.

=== San Diego Padres ===
On April 3, 2022, the Athletics traded Manaea and Aaron Holiday to the San Diego Padres for Adrián Martínez and Euribiel Angeles. In 2022 with San Diego he was 8–9 with a 4.96 ERA in 30 games (28 starts) in which he pitched 158 innings and struck out 156 batters.

Manaea became a free agent following the conclusion of the 2022 season.

=== San Francisco Giants ===
On December 16, 2022, Manaea signed a two-year, $25 million contract with the San Francisco Giants. He made 37 appearances (10 starts) for the Giants in 2023, compiling a 7–6 record and 4.44 ERA with 128 strikeouts across 117 2/3 innings pitched. On November 5, 2023, Manaea opted out of the second year of his contract and became a free agent.

=== New York Mets ===
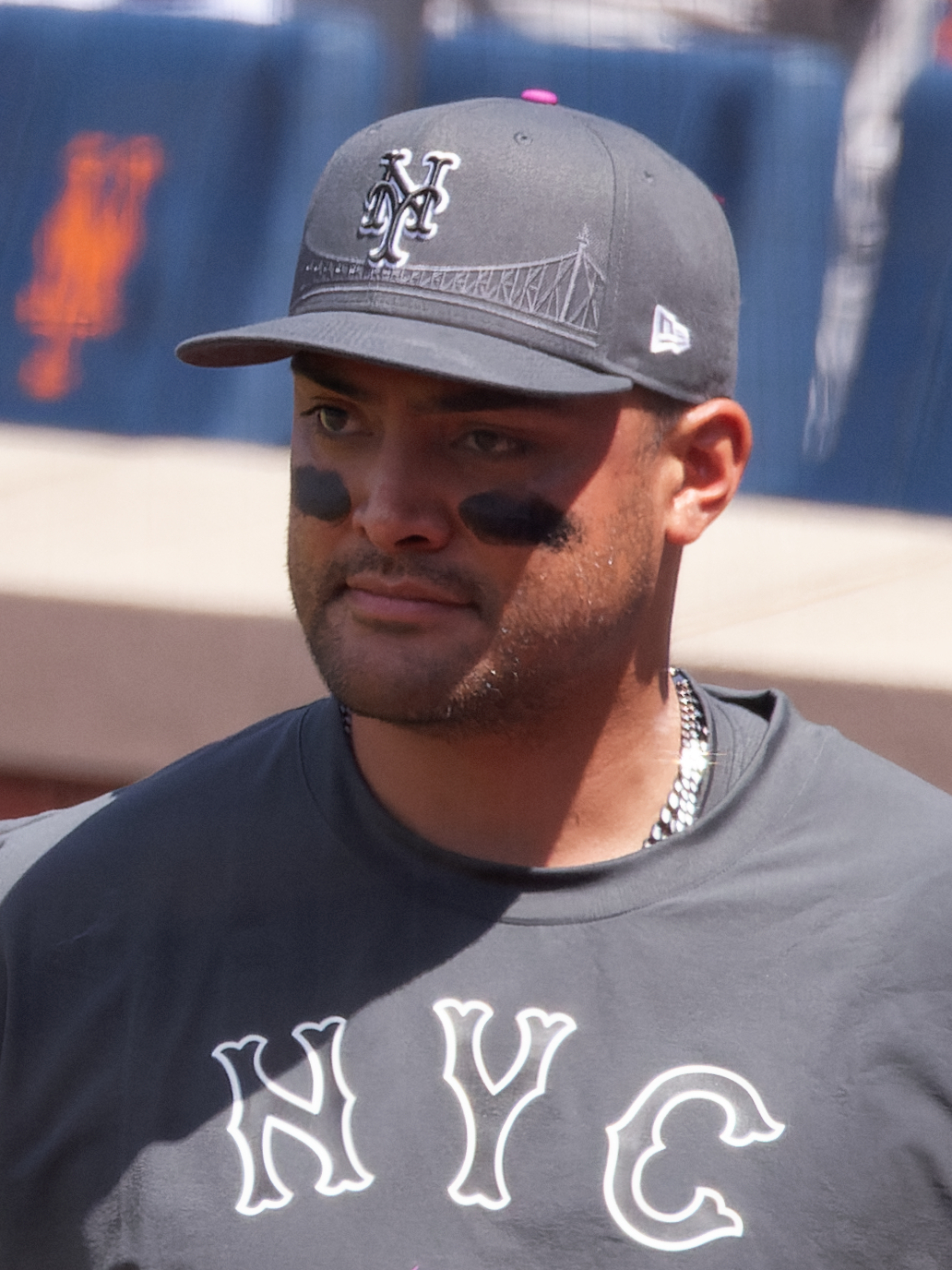
Manaea with the Mets in 2024

On January 12, 2024, Manaea signed a two-year, $28 million contract with the New York Mets including an opt-out after the 2024 season. On June 26, Manaea recorded the 1,000th strikeout of his career, fanning Juan Soto in the third inning of a 12–2 victory over the New York Yankees. Manaea made 32 starts for the Mets in 2024, posting a 12–6 record and a 3.47 ERA with 184 strikeouts across 181^{2}/_{3} innings pitched, setting a career high.

Manaea earned the first postseason win of his career on October 8, pitching seven innings of one-run ball against the Philadelphia Phillies in Game 3 of the National League Division Series at Citi Field. After the 2024 season, Manaea opted out of his contract with the Mets and became a free agent. The Mets offered him a qualifying offer, but he declined. On December 27, 2024, Manaea signed a three-year, $75 million contract to remain with the Mets.

On February 24, 2025, the Mets announced that Manaea had suffered a right oblique strain and would be expected to begin the season on the injured list. He was transferred to the 60-day injured list on April 29. He made his season debut on July 13 against the Kansas City Royals in relief, but allowed a walk-off hit to Nick Loftin in the bottom of the 9th inning. Manaea was moved to the bullpen on September 14, after struggling to a 5.76 ERA across 10 starts. Across 15 games in 2025, 12 of which were starts, Manaea posted a 2–4 record with a 5.64 ERA and 75 strikeouts.

Manaea began the 2026 season as a relief pitcher. He began the season with a 6.85 ERA as of May 10, but then pitched to a 3.09 ERA over his next 11 2/3 innings. The Mets returned Manaea to the starting rotation on May 30. Across 33 games in 2026, 19 of which were starts, Manaea posted a 6–8 record with a 4.78 ERA and 144 strikeouts.

== Personal life ==
Manaea's father, Faaloloi, was born in Lauliʻi, American Samoa, moved to Hawaii, served in the Vietnam War, and was then stationed in Indiana, where he settled and worked for the Inland Steel Company following his military service. His mother, Opal, is a factory worker. Manaea's older half-brother from his father's first marriage, David, died in January 2024 from cancer. Manaea took David's age at his death, 59, as his number with the Mets. His other older brother, Dane, is in the United States Navy.

Growing up in Indiana, Manaea was isolated from his father's Samoan culture. Manaea first visited American Samoa in 2014. There, he began his sleeve tattoo, using traditional Samoan symbols. Some of the tattoo signifies knowledge, wisdom and strength.

Manaea and Talat Mirmalek, a former San Francisco Fire Department paramedic, were married in Indianapolis on November 16, 2024.

== See also ==
- List of Major League Baseball no-hitters

Achievements
Preceded by Edinson Vólquez	No-hitter pitcher April 21, 2018	Succeeded by Walker Buehler, Tony Cingrani, Yimi Garcia, Adam Liberatore
