= Caesars Southern Indiana =

American casino hotel

Coordinates: 38°10′48″N 85°54′18″W

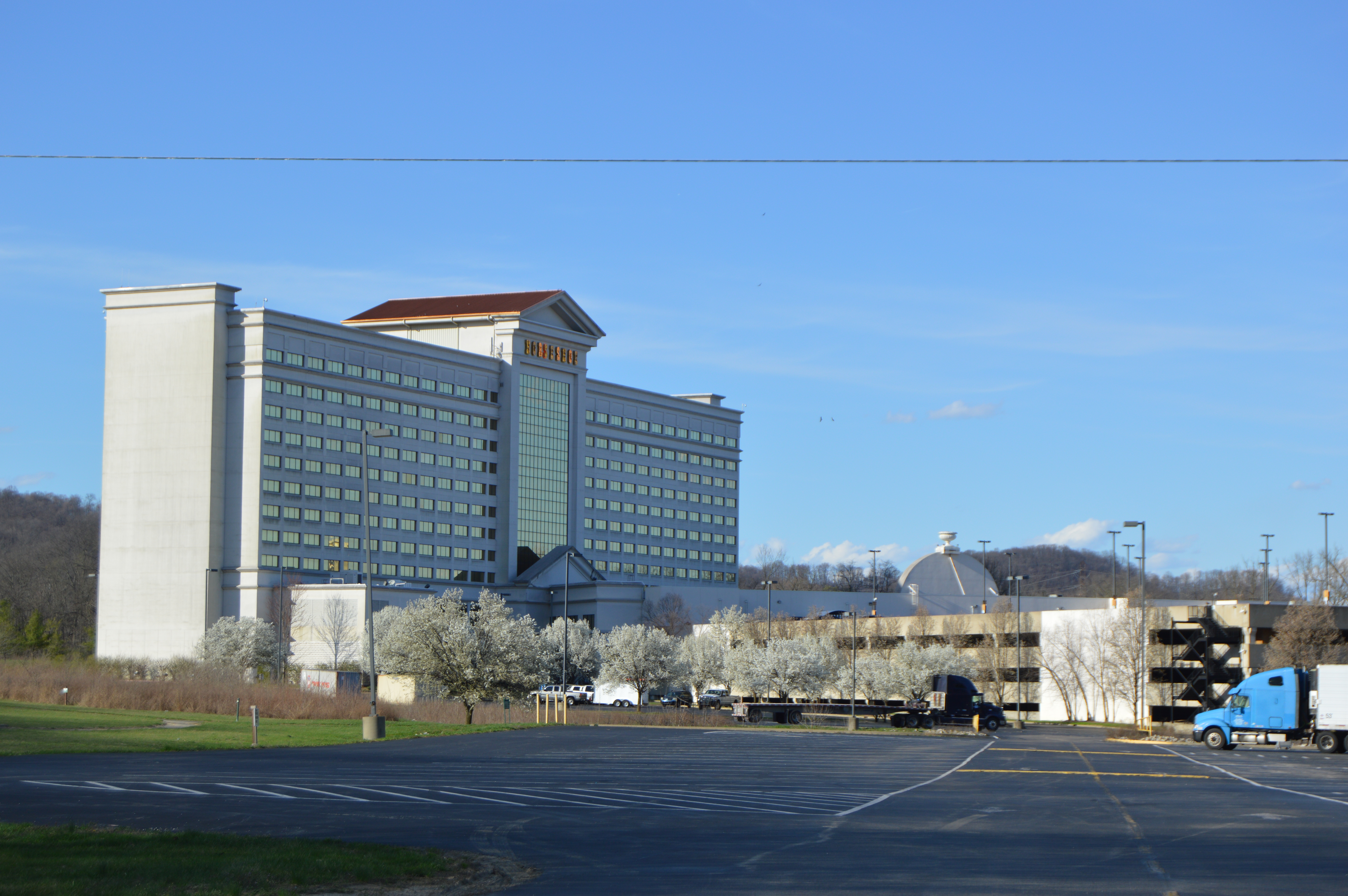
- View from the west
- Interactive map of Caesars Southern Indiana
- Location: Elizabeth, Indiana; 11999 Casino Center Drive SE
- Opened: December 12, 2019
- Theme: Romanesque
- No. of rooms: 503
- Gaming space: 110,000-square-foot (10,000 m^{2})
- Casino type: Land-based
- Owner: Vici Properties
- Operating license holder: EBCI Holdings, LLC
- Previous names: Caesars Indiana (1998-2008); Horseshoe Southern Indiana (2008-2019)
- Renovated in: 2008, 2016, 2019
- Website: caesars.com/caesars-southern-indiana

Caesars Southern Indiana (formerly Caesars Indiana and Horseshoe Southern Indiana) is a casino hotel in Southern Indiana. Opened in 1998, it is owned by Vici Properties and operated by the Eastern Band of Cherokee Indians, using the Caesars name under license from Caesars Entertainment. It is located outside the community of Elizabeth, Indiana at the Harrison County line, across the Ohio River from Louisville, Kentucky. This is the closest casino to Louisville because casino gambling is not allowed in neighboring Floyd County. Locals often simply call it "The Boat", a reference to the former riverboat that was the main focus of the complex.

The complex includes over 100,000 square feet (9,300 m^{2}) of gaming space, a sports betting lounge, and several restaurants. Other amenities include a hotel, a pavilion, a showroom, two parking decks, and a golf course. Steelman Partners designed the hotel.

== History ==
On November 8, 1994, a ballot proposal to allow riverboat gambling was passed by the residents of Harrison County, Indiana, following legislation passed by the General Assembly to allow such gambling in the Hoosier state. In January 1995 five different proposals were given to the Indiana Gaming Commission in order to begin a riverboat gambling organization in Harrison County. Over a year passed before the proposition by the partnership of ITT Corporation's Caesars division and Riverboat Development Incorporated (RDI) was approved, granting the Caesars World/RDI partnership the preliminary license in May 1996.

The initial plan of the Caesars/RDI partnership was for the complex to cost $228 million, but by early 1998 the projected cost was raised to $275 million. They chose a site near Bridgeport, Indiana, an unincorporated town located immediately on the Harrison County side of the Harrison County/Floyd County border; the site is 15 miles (24 km) southwest of Louisville, Kentucky (Kentucky's largest metropolis), and was selected after performing a study to determine the nearest accessible location (to the city) that would permit a riverboat casino to operate legally. Louisville officials attempted to delay the construction of Caesars Indiana, to protect the gambling revenue of Churchill Downs and other Kentucky horse racing interests. Environmental groups lodged similar complaints due to concerns regarding the potential negative impact of the proposed development on local air quality, waterways, and wildlife. The Caesars/RDI partnership had already spent $11 million on making necessary improvements to use the newly acquired property. A preliminary study by the United States Army Corps of Engineers in February 1998 determined that further environmental studies, which would have delayed the building of the necessary facilities for Caesars Indiana, were not necessary. However, the United States Army Corps of Engineers did caution the Caesars/RDI partnership to carefully consider the number of trees to be cleared and the impact on runoff water.

Caesars Indiana was finally opened to the public on November 20, 1998. The riverboat was initially slated to begin operating in the summer of 1998, but interference by three different Indiana environmental groups issuing lawsuits, the United States Environmental Protection Agency (due to the Army Corps of Engineers concluding that a full environmental study was unnecessary), and heavy rains in the spring of 1998 delayed the opening. A VIP cruise on November 16, 1998, was the first sailing of the riverboat.

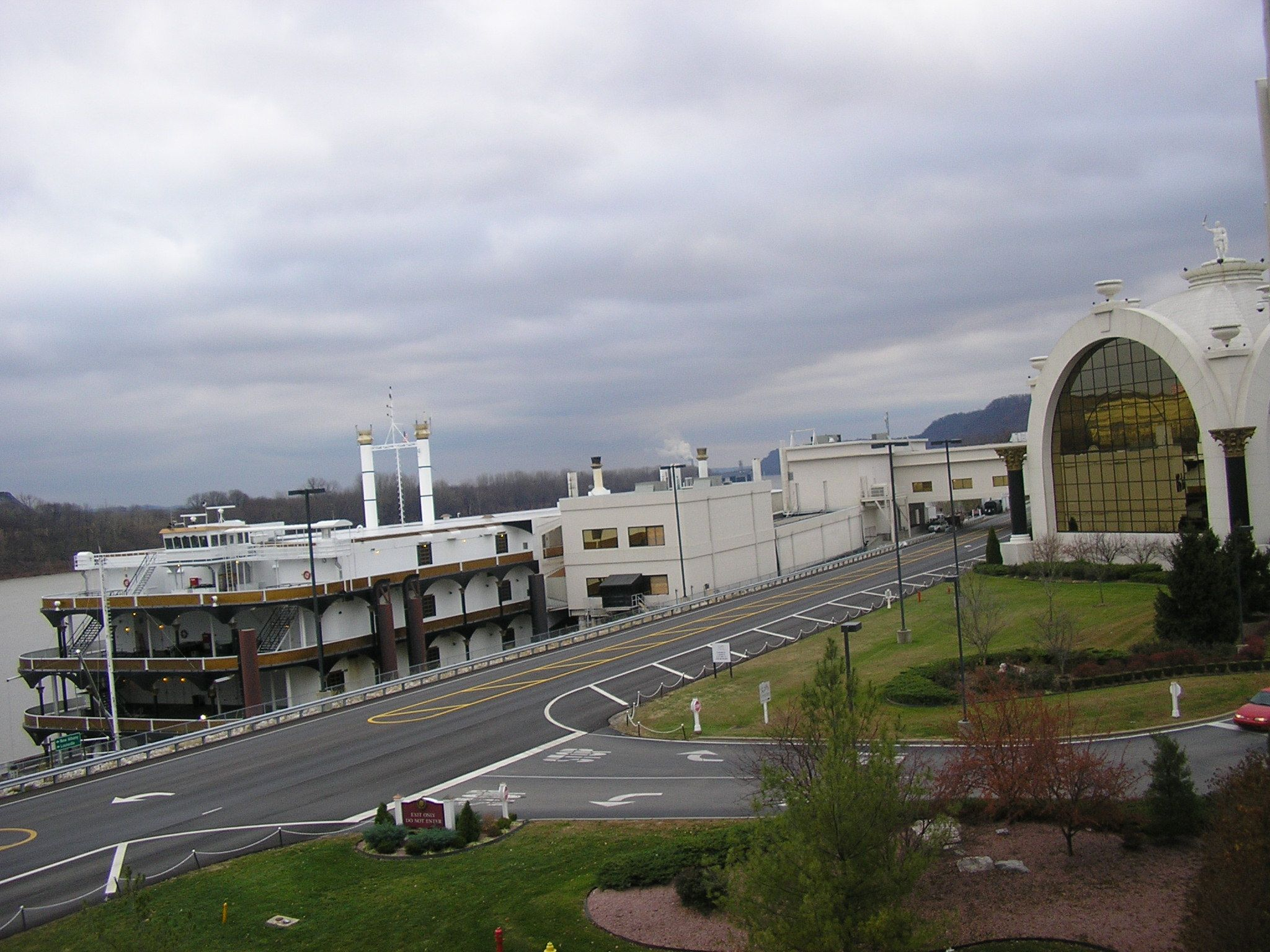
Horseshoe Southern Indiana

Since 1998, Horseshoe Southern Indiana has employed 2,400 people. It has been estimated that Horseshoe Southern Indiana has diverted $12 million in lottery revenue annually from the state of Kentucky. Because the original charter of the Colony of Virginia gave Virginia ownership of the entire Ohio River, which now forms the border between Kentucky and Indiana, Kentucky (which was split from Virginia in 1792) claims ownership of the entire river, and has often threatened to stop operations of riverboat casinos on the Ohio in neighboring states. Notably, a resolution proposed in the Kentucky House in 2002 called for "the purchase of a submarine to patrol the waters of the Commonwealth and search and destroy all casino riverboats." However, the non-binding resolution was never on the docket for a vote, and its sponsor said the resolution was in jest to protest Kentucky's ongoing prohibition of casino gambling.

Due to the ownership of Caesars World having changed hands, Caesars Indiana was run by Starwood Hotels and Resorts, and then by Park Place Entertainment.

From June 7 to June 19, 1999, the casino was shut down due to a river barge hitting the riverboat and due to excessive silt at its mooring site. It shut down again from March 20 to March 23, 2008, due to unusually high river levels. High river levels again caused them to close in March 2011, April 2011 and March 2015, each for a handful of days.

As part of its continual existence, the State of Indiana requires the casino to give money to two different charitable foundations in Harrison and Floyd Counties.

In 2002, the Indiana legislature voted to allow casino riverboats to dock permanently. From 2002 to 2019, the riverboat never left the dock, except for once per year to prove to the United States Coast Guard that the vessel was seaworthy and could move under its own power.

Horseshoe Southern Indiana was given as an example to discredit Kentucky governor Ernie Fletcher's claims that Kentucky casinos would facilitate prostitution during the 2007 Kentucky governors race.

In recent years, Horseshoe Southern Indiana has co-sponsored Thunder Over Louisville.

An earthquake on April 18, 2008, caused the complex to lose electrical power, and it had to rely on backup generators.

Completed in April 2017, a $13-million renovation refurbished all 503 guest rooms, suites and the hotel lobby. The hotel remained fully operational during the renovation.

In October 2017, ownership of the property was transferred to Vici Properties as part of a corporate spin-off, and it was leased back to Caesars Entertainment.

In 2015, the Indiana legislature amended the law to allow casino gambling on land. In 2018, construction began on a land-based casino to replace the riverboat. On December 9, 2019, the riverboat was permanently closed. On December 12, 2019, a $90-million 110,000-square-foot (10,000 m^{2}) land-based casino replaced the riverboat after 18 months of construction. The property's name was changed to Caesars Southern Indiana to coincide with the opening. The new venue includes dining, shopping, gaming, and entertainment. Sports wagering was also added to the venue following Indiana's legalization of sports betting earlier in 2019.

In September 2021, Caesars sold the operating business of Caesars Southern Indiana to the Eastern Band of Cherokee Indians (EBCI) for $250 million. The tribe would lease the complex from Vici for $33 million per year. The property would keep its existing name, under license from Caesars.

== Facilities ==
The former main focus of the Horseshoe Southern Indiana complex was the M/V Glory of Rome riverboat, a four-story boat that was the largest riverboat in North America. It was also the largest riverboat casino in the world. It cost $50 million to construct. It is 452 feet (138 m) long, 100 feet (30 m) wide, with a total area of 173,200 square feet (16,090 m^{2}). It has four 1,000 horsepower (750 kW) Z-Drives. The smokestacks rise 100 feet (30 m) from the waterline, with eight feet below the waterline. The riverboat had 93,000-square-foot (8,600 m^{2}) of casino space with a maximum capacity of 5,030 "persons" (passengers and crew combined), with 3,600 gaming positions, 2,800 slot machines, and over 140 gaming tables. Since the casino has now moved onto dry land, and the riverboat is no longer part of the casino complex, Caesars announced plans to sell the riverboat.

In a year 2000 study by the state of Indiana, 51.4% of casino employees are female, 12.9% are minorities, and 42.3% of employees coming from places other than Harrison, Floyd, and Clark County, Indiana. Only 30% of the 4.5 million entrants to the casino were of Indiana residents. There were 68 arrests that year, mostly due to public drunkenness.

Caesars Southern Indiana also includes a nature preserve, over 10 restaurants, a conference center, hotel, shopping center, and a nearby golf course with an equestrian theme called Chariot Run.

In September 2022 it was announced that a Gordon Ramsay Steak restaurant will be opened at Caesars Southern Indiana before the end of the year.

== Transportation ==
Bus shuttles to Caesars Southern Indiana from Indianapolis and Louisville are made available, with reservations available.

The facility includes a four-level parking garage, and is primarily accessed by Indiana 111. Although it is located directly across the river from Southwest Louisville, due to the lack of a bridge, Louisvillians must drive north first through New Albany to reach Caesars. During various parts of the planning of the Ohio River Bridges Project, a bridge connecting Louisville directly to Indiana 111 has been proposed, with a primary advantage being easier access to Caesars. However, as of 2019, no plans existed for such a bridge.

== See also ==
- Gambling in Indiana
- List of attractions and events in the Louisville metropolitan area
- Harrah's Cherokee
- Harrah's Cherokee Valley River
- List of integrated resorts
