= NCEL =

NCEL may refer to:

- North Carolina Education Lottery
- Northern Counties East League
