= SCHS =

SCHS may refer to:

== Schools ==
- South Central High School (disambiguation)

=== Australia ===
- San Clemente High School (Mayfield, New South Wales), Australia
- Suzanne Cory High School, Werribee, Victoria, Australia

=== Canada ===
- South Carleton High School, Richmond, Ontario
- Springbank Community High School, Springbank, Alberta, Canada
- Steinbach Christian School, Steinbach, Manitoba, Canada
- Sturgeon Composite High School, Sturgeon County, Alberta, Canada

=== England ===
- School of Health Sciences, City University London, City University, London
- South Charnwood High School, Leicester, England
- Standish Community High School, Standish, England
- Streatham and Clapham High School, South London

=== Malaysia ===
- Sabah Chinese High School, Sabah, Malaysia

=== United States ===
- Santa Clara High School (Oxnard, California)
- Santa Clara High School (Santa Clara, California)
- San Clemente High School
- Santa Cruz High School, Santa Cruz, California
- Steele Canyon High School, Spring Valley, California
- Sussex Central High School (Delaware), Georgetown, Delaware
- Summer Creek High School, Houston, Texas
- South Cobb High School, Austell, Georgia
- Scott County High School, Kentucky
- Sheldon Clark High School, near Inez, Kentucky
- South Carroll High School, Sykesville, Maryland
- South Christian High School, near Grand Rapids, Michigan
- Stoney Creek High School, Rochester, Michigan
- St. Charles High School (Minnesota), St. Charles, Minnesota
- South Caldwell High School, Hudson, North Carolina
- Shadow Creek High School, Pearland, Texas
- Stewarts Creek High School, Smyrna, Tennessee
- Snow Canyon High School (Utah), St. George, Utah
- South County High School (Fairfax County, Virginia), Lorton, Virginia
- Shorecrest High School, Shoreline, Washington
- St. Clair High School (Missouri), St. Clair, Missouri
- St. Cloud High School, Saint Cloud, Florida

== Other uses ==
- Sandwich Class Housing Scheme, a Hong Kong program offering apartments to middle-income families
- St. Charles Health System, Bend, Oregon
- South Carolina Historical Society, Charleston, South Carolina

== See also ==
- Saudi Commission for Health Specialties (SCFHS)
