= Gambling in North Carolina =

Legal forms of gambling in the U.S. state of North Carolina include the North Carolina Education Lottery, three Indian casinos, charitable bingo and raffles, and low-stakes "beach bingo". North Carolina has long resisted expansion of gambling, owing to its conservative Bible Belt culture.

== Early history ==
Gambling laws appeared in North Carolina as early as 1749, when the General Assembly adopted an English statute that discouraged "excessive and immoderate" gambling by invalidating gambling debts greater than £100. A 1753 law invalidated gambling debts of any amount, forbade gambling in public, and limited a gambler's losses to 40s in a day; the cap was reduced to 5s in 1763. In 1784, to raise revenue for the government, the anti-gambling law was repealed, and taxes were imposed of 8s per deck of playing cards and 10s per "box and dice". New games named "A.B.C. and E.O. tables", which the legislature called "an evil species of gaming", were slapped with a £250 tax in 1785, and were banned entirely, along with other gaming tables, in 1791.

Lotteries were authorized on occasion to attempt to raise money for various good causes, as was common in early American history. For example, a lottery to raise £200 for navigation improvements on the New River was approved in 1761, and Judge Archibald Murphey was authorized in 1826 to raise up to $15,000 in a lottery to fund his work on a book of North Carolina history. From 1809 to 1835, the legislature approved 62 lotteries. Then, in 1835, amid a nationwide movement against lotteries, the legislature banned them.

== Bingo and raffles ==
Non-profit organizations recognized by the Secretary of State are allowed to operate bingo games for fund-raising. The organization must receive a bingo license from the Department of Public Safety, and may run no more than two games per week, with prizes no higher than $500. Such organizations can also run up to two raffles per year, with cash prizes not exceeding $10,000 and non-cash prizes not exceeding $50,000. Bingo games with prizes of $10 or less, referred to as "beach bingo", may be run commercially with few limitations.

Laws permitting bingo appeared as early as 1945, when it was legalized at fairs and exhibitions in Mecklenburg County. Similar laws were passed for various counties and towns, with some (such as Guilford and Carteret Counties) limited to charities and other community organizations, while others (such as Surf City and White Lake) had no such requirement. Some bingo laws passed in 1973 also authorized the game of skilo. Laws allowing charitable raffles, alongside bingo, in particular counties were passed in 1977.

This patchwork system of laws was replaced in 1979 with a statewide law allowing bingo and raffles for non-profit organizations, and unregulated bingo games with prizes under $10. Further regulations were enacted in 1983 requiring charitable bingo operators to be licensed by the Department of Revenue.

== Greyhound racing ==
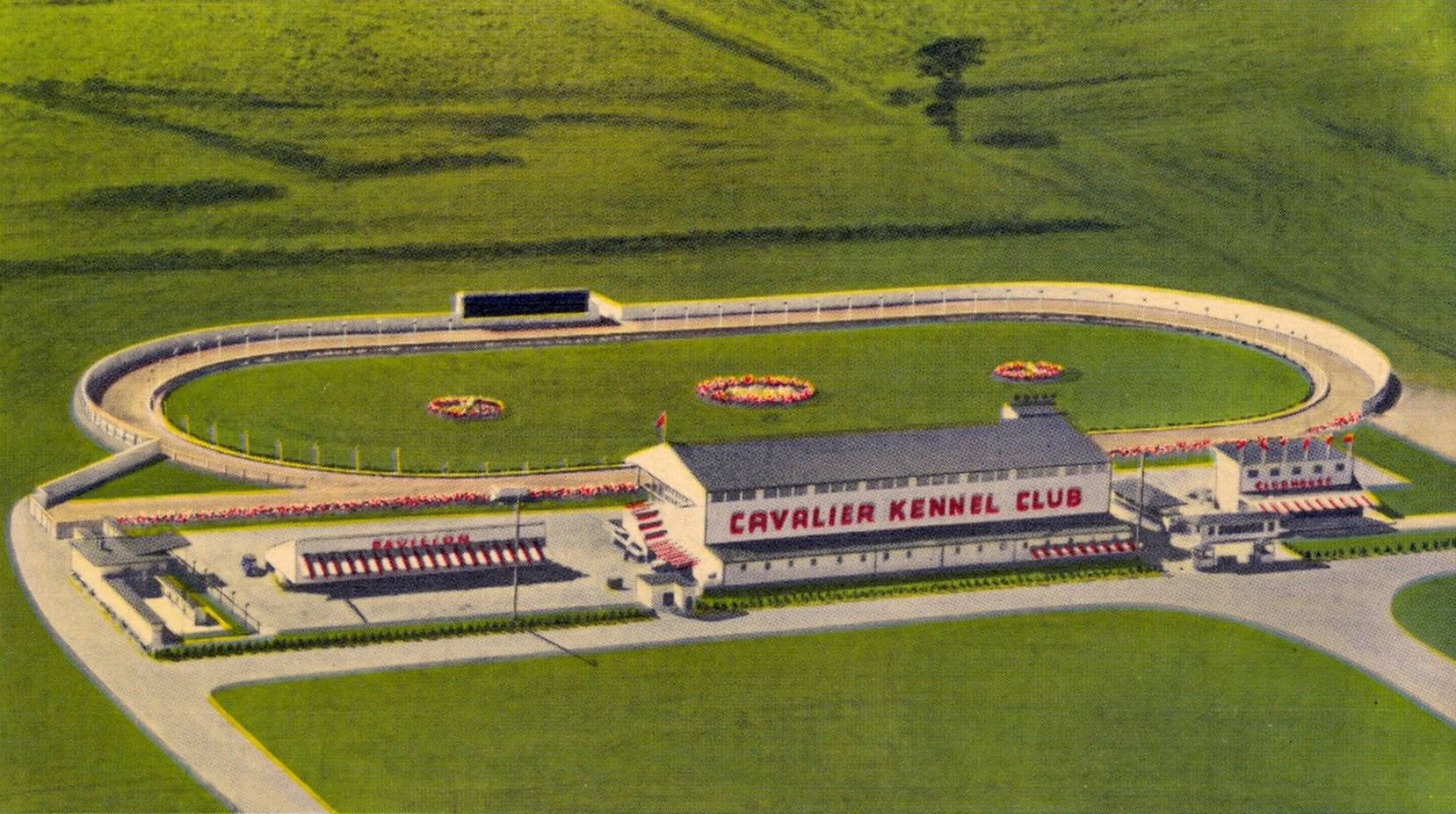
Postcard of the Cavalier Kennel Club in Moyock

Two greyhound tracks with parimutuel wagering operated in the state from the late 1940s to 1954.

The General Assembly in 1939 authorized a horse or dog track to be opened outside of Morehead City. The Carolina Racing Association opened its greyhound track there in 1948. Races were held nightly during the summer, catering to beach tourists. A similar act was passed for Currituck County in 1949, and the Cavalier Kennel Club in Moyock opened the same year. The season there ran from October to November, and mainly attracted bettors from the Norfolk area.

The North Carolina Supreme Court ruled in 1954 that the Currituck racing law violated the state constitution by granting a monopoly and giving special privileges to a private entity (the racing association). A similar decision later that year closed the Morehead City track, with the additional argument that the legislature had unconstitutionally delegated authority to town voters over a track not located in the town.

== Indian gaming ==
Two federally recognized tribes operate a total of three casinos in North Carolina. The Eastern Band of Cherokee Indians has the Harrah's Cherokee and Harrah's Cherokee Valley River casinos on its Qualla Boundary territory in the Great Smoky Mountains. The Catawba Indian Nation operates the Catawba Two Kings Casino on tribal land in Kings Mountain. The Cherokee also operate a high-stakes bingo parlor.

The Cherokee's high-stakes bingo games began in 1982, following a federal court decision that exempted Indian reservations from state limits on bingo prizes. In 1994, the tribe reached a compact with Governor Jim Hunt under the Indian Gaming Regulatory Act, allowing construction of a casino with electronic games requiring "skill or dexterity". An interim casino attached to the bingo parlor opened in January 1995, and the $82-million permanent casino, managed by Harrah's Entertainment, opened in November 1997. In 2001, an amendment to the compact was made that raised the legal gambling age from 18 to 21. After negotiating a new compact with Governor Beverly Perdue, Harrah's Cherokee began offering table games in August 2012, and the tribe was allowed to build a second casino, Harrah's Cherokee Valley River, which opened in September 2015 in Murphy, North Carolina.

The Catawba applied in September 2013 to take land into trust for their proposed casino, even though the tribe at the time had no sovereign land in the state (its main reservation is just across the state line in Rock Hill, South Carolina). They opened their casino, Catawba Two Kings Casino, in a temporary facility in July 2021.

== Lottery ==
The North Carolina Education Lottery, begun in 2006, offers scratch-off games and drawing games, including the multi-jurisdictional Mega Millions and Powerball games.

== Sports betting ==
Sports betting in North Carolina is offered by licensed online operators and at retail sportsbooks at the three tribal casinos.

Online sports betting can be operated by the two casino tribes and by certain professional sports organizations and venues in the state, or by a designated partner of such organizations. As of March 2024, there are eight online sports betting operators, listed along with their partner organization(s):

- Bet365 (Charlotte Hornets)
- BetMGM (Charlotte Motor Speedway)
- Caesars (Eastern Band of Cherokee Indians)
- DraftKings (NASCAR)
- ESPN Bet (Quail Hollow Club)
- Fanatics (Carolina Hurricanes)
- FanDuel (Carolina Panthers and PGA Tour)
- Underdog (Sedgefield Country Club)

Retail sportsbooks are permitted at tribal casinos and at eight professional sports venues around the state (Bank of America Stadium, Charlotte Motor Speedway, North Wilkesboro Speedway, PNC Arena, Quail Hollow Club, Sedgefield Country Club, Spectrum Center, and WakeMed Soccer Park). None of these sports venues have yet opened a sportsbook.

Following the 2018 overturning of the federal ban on sports betting, the state passed a law in 2019 allowing tribal gaming compacts to be modified to authorize retail sportsbooks at casinos. The Eastern Band of Cherokee Indians was the first to open sportsbooks at its casinos in Cherokee and Murphy in 2021. The Catawba Indian Nation followed in 2022 at their temporary casino in Kings Mountain.

In 2023, the state passed a new law that expanded the locations where sportsbooks can be opened and legalized online sports betting throughout the state, with operations to begin as soon as January 2024. The North Carolina Lottery Commission would issue up to 12 online sports wagering licenses. Parimutuel betting would also be permitted through a separate licensing system. The law was amended later in the year to require online sports betting operators to partner with a professional sports organization, which gave sports teams more control of the online market and reduced the number of possible operators to 11.

== Video poker and sweepstakes parlors ==
Video poker machines were once widespread in the state. Regulations enacted in 2000 limited them to three machines per location, and blocked the installation of any new machines. There were an estimated 10,000 legal machines remaining in the state in 2006, plus 20,000 illegal machines. The Senate made five attempts over the years to ban the game, but was blocked by House Speaker Jim Black. Pressure mounted on Black after he was tied to state and federal investigations into the video poker industry, and he agreed to a one-year phase-out of the game. A complete ban went into effect in 2007.

After the ban, an industry of sweepstakes parlors arose, operating in a legal gray area by offering chances to win when customers purchase Internet or phone time. The General Assembly tried to close the parlors in 2010 by outlawing any video sweepstakes with an "entertaining display", but the ban did not take effect until January 2013 due to a legal challenge by the industry. Even then, some operators said they would comply with the law with new "pre-reveal" software that shows the player their prize before the game is played. As of 2019, the industry remained active, with an estimated 100 sweepstakes parlors operating in Wake County alone.

Beginning around 2017, a new type of video arcade in which players can win money by playing "Fish Hunter" games began gaining popularity around the state. Operators claim the games are legal games of skill, but some authorities believe them to be illegal games of chance.

== See also ==
- Gambling in the United States
- Law of North Carolina
