= Indiana State Road 111 =

State highway in Indiana, United States

State Road 111
- SR 111 highlighted in red

Route information
- Maintained by INDOT
- Length: 24.778 mi (39.876 km)
- Existed: 1935–present

Major junctions
- South end: Dead end at the Ohio River near New Boston
- North end: Intersection of SR 111 and SR 60

Location
- Country: United States
- State: Indiana
- Counties: Harrison, Floyd, Clark

Highway system
- Indiana State Highway System; Interstate; US; State; Scenic
← SR 110	→ SR 114

State Road 111 (SR 111) in the U.S. state of Indiana is a rural two-lane highway that runs between New Boston and New Albany in the far southern portion of the state. It has existed since 1935. Part of the highway was decommissioned in October 2012 and more was decommissioned in January 2013.

== Route description ==
The southern terminus of State Road 111 is at a dead end on the shores of the Ohio River, near the small community of New Boston. From there, it runs to the north and east, closely following the course of the river for about 13 miles (21 km), at which point it intersects with the east–west State Road 211. It continues to follow the river toward Bridgeport. It continues north, entering downtown New Albany. From there, it turns to meet at its current northern terminus at the intersection of Main Street and State Street.

== History ==
Before 1935, SR 111 was known as SR 133. When U.S. Route 33 (US 33) was commissioned in Indiana, SR 33 was decommissioned. SR 133 followed the same route as SR 111. In October 2012, the portion of SR 111 in Clark County was turned over to the county, with the Floyd County portion turned over to the county in January 2013.

== Major intersections ==
County	Location	mi	km	Destinations	Notes
Harrison	Taylor Township	0.000	0.000	Dead end at the Ohio River	Southern terminus of SR 111
Harrison	Posey Township	12.559	20.212	SR 211 west	Eastern terminus of SR 211
Floyd	New Albany	24.778	39.876	Main Street; State Street	Northern terminus of SR 111
1.000 mi = 1.609 km; 1.000 km = 0.621 mi

== See also ==
- Indiana State Road 11
