= Bridgeport, Harrison County, Indiana =

Unincorporated community in Indiana, United States

Coordinates: 38.17618°N 85.90635°W

Bridgeport is an unincorporated community in Posey Township, Harrison County, Indiana, in the United States.

== History ==
Bridgeport was laid out in 1849.

Caesars Southern Indiana casino has been in operation at Bridgeport since 1998.
