= Glen Rosenbaum =

Glen Otis Rosenbaum (born June 14, 1936) is an American former professional baseball player, coach, and front-office official who spent four decades as a member of the Chicago White Sox organization. He was born in Union Mills, Indiana.

A 5 ft 11 in (1.80 m), 180 lb (82 kg) right-handed pitcher in his playing days, he had an 11-season (1955–1965) active career in the ChiSox' farm system, winning 95 of 140 decisions (.679) but never reaching the Major League level.

In 1968, he became the team's batting practice pitcher, and was promoted to a full-time coaching position on manager Chuck Tanner's staff on August 14, 1973, serving through 1975. After serving strictly as a batting practice pitcher for another ten seasons, Rosenbaum rejoined the White Sox' coaching staff in 1986, and was an aide to managers Jim Fregosi and Jeff Torborg through 1989.

He then was the club's traveling secretary until his retirement after the 1998 season.
