= Indiana State Road 11 =

State highway in Indiana, United States

State Road 11
- SR 11 highlighted in red

Route information
- Maintained by INDOT
- Length: 56.004 mi (90.130 km)
- Existed: October 1, 1926–present

Southern segment
- Length: 29.820 mi (47.991 km)
- South end: SR 135 near Mauckport
- North end: SR 62 near Lanesville

Northern segment
- Length: 26.184 mi (42.139 km)
- South end: SR 250 in Dudleytown
- Major intersections: US 50 in Seymour
- North end: SR 46 near Columbus

Location
- Country: United States
- State: Indiana
- Counties: Bartholomew, Jackson, Floyd, Harrison

Highway system
- Indiana State Highway System; Interstate; US; State; Scenic
← SR 10	→ US 12

State Road 11 (SR 11) in the U.S. state of Indiana is located in south central Indiana and is divided into a northern and southern section. These sections were never connected. One section of the highway was previously numbered State Road 33 (SR 33).

== Route description ==
=== Southern section ===
The southern portion is a southwest–northeast road in Floyd and Harrison counties. Its southern terminus is at State Road 135 near the town of Mauckport, which is on the Ohio River. From there, the highway runs roughly northeast for a distance of about 30 miles (48 km) and ends where it meets State Road 62, east of the town of Lanesville.

=== Northern section ===
The northern portion is a north–south road in Bartholomew and Jackson counties. Its southern terminus is at State Road 250 in the small town of Dudleytown a few miles south of Seymour; the highway runs north through Seymour to Columbus, a distance of about 26 miles (42 km), and ends where it meets Indiana State Road 46.

== History ==
State Road 33
- Location: Mauckport–Bennettsville

Before 1935 the southern section of SR 11 was numbered SR 33. Then in 1935 U.S. Route 33 (US 33) was commissioned in Indiana and SR 33 was decommissioned.

In the 1970s the northern section of SR 11 was numbered U.S. Route 31 Alternate (US 31 Alt.).

== Major intersections ==
County	Location	mi	km	Destinations	Notes
Harrison	Mauckport	0.000	0.000	SR 135 – Brandenburg	Southern terminus of SR 11
Harrison	Boone Township	10.482	16.869	SR 337 north – Corydon	Southern terminus of SR 337
Harrison	Posey Township	20.253	32.594	SR 211 east	Western terminus of SR 211
Floyd	Franklin Township	29.820	47.991	SR 62 – Corydon, New Albany	Northern terminus of the southern section of SR 11
Gap in route
Jackson	Dudleytown	29.821	47.992	SR 250 – Brownstown, Madison	Southern terminus of the northern section of SR 11
Jackson	Seymour	37.832	60.885	US 50 west – Bedford	Western end of US 50 concurrency
Jackson	Seymour	38.146	61.390	US 50 east – North Vernon	Eastern end of US 50 concurrency
Jackson	Seymour	38.667	62.229	SR 258 west	Eastern terminus of SR 258
Jackson	Redding Township	42.763– 43.191	68.820– 69.509	I-65 – Indianapolis, Louisville	Exit 55 on I-65
Bartholomew	Columbus	56.004	90.130	SR 46 – Bloomington, Columbus	Northern terminus of SR 11
1.000 mi = 1.609 km; 1.000 km = 0.621 mi: Concurrency terminus
