= Harrah's Cherokee Valley River =

Casino and hotel in Murphy, North Carolina

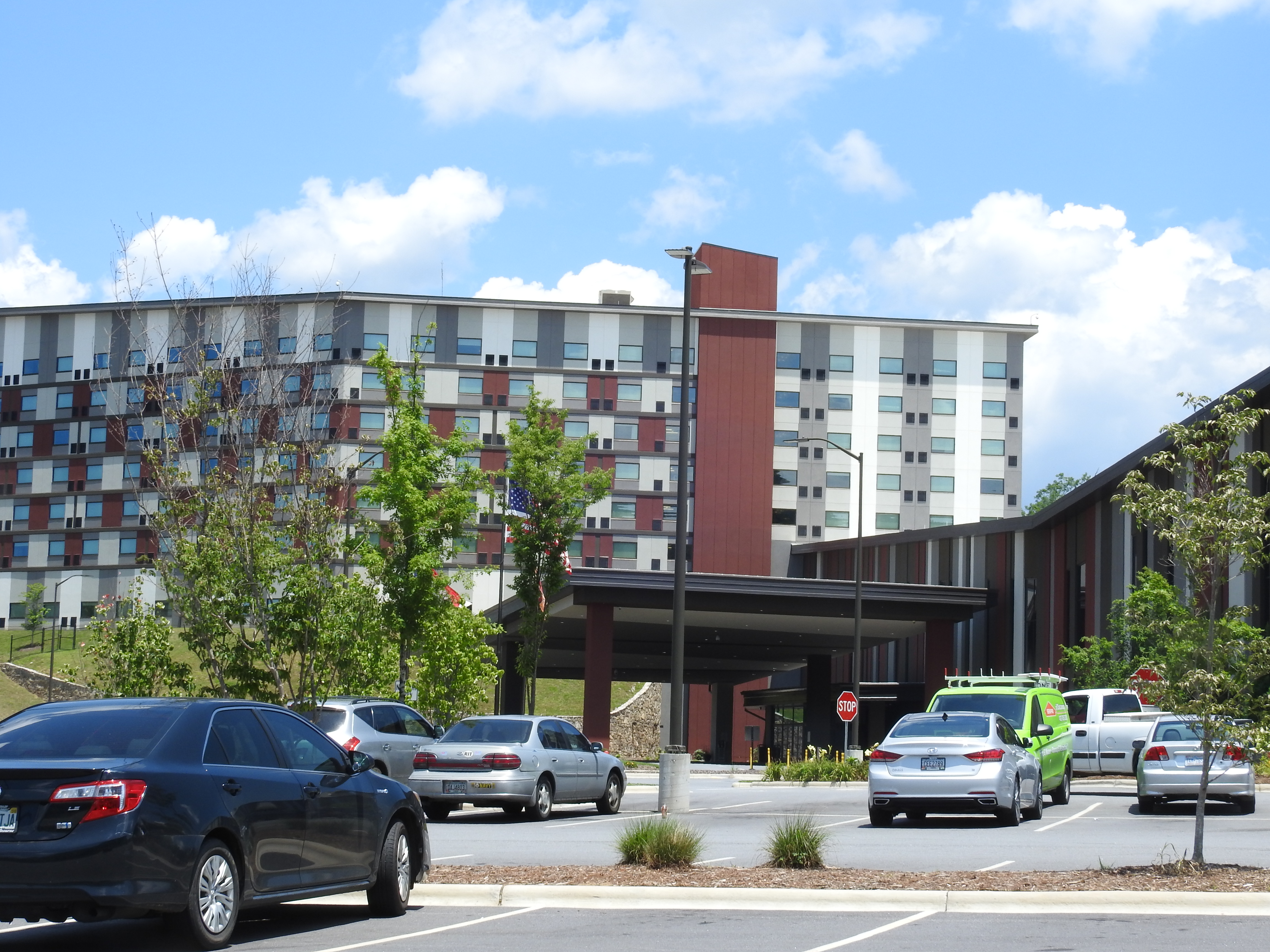
- Interactive map of Harrah's Cherokee Valley River
- Location: Murphy, North Carolina; 777 Casino Parkway; 35°6′54″N 83°59′33″W
- Opened: September 28, 2015
- No. of rooms: 300
- Gaming space: 50,000 sq ft (4,600 m^{2})
- Notable restaurants: The Landing Café
- Casino type: Land-based
- Owner: EBCI Holdings, LLC
- Architect: Cuningham Group Architecture; JCJ Architecture
- Renovated in: 2018
- Website: Official Website

Harrah's Cherokee Valley River is a casino and hotel on the Qualla Boundary in Murphy, North Carolina. It is owned by the Eastern Band of Cherokee Indians (EBCI) and operated by Caesars Entertainment.

== History ==
Proposed in 2014 and at a cost of $110 million, Harrah's Cherokee Valley River opened on September 28, 2015; designed by Cuningham Group Architecture Inc., the facility included a gaming floor, hotel and food court. In 2018, a $13 million expansion added a 41,000 square foot (3,800 m^{2}) entertainment area that includes bowling, arcade games and a full-service restaurant. In March 2021 sports betting was added.

On July 8, 2021, the EBCI approved a $275 million expansion that will include an additional hotel tower, a new restaurant, a hotel lobby café, a spa and indoor pool, and additional gaming space; JCJ Architecture was designated to design the expansion. Slated to be completed in 2024, it will add 296 rooms, 300 slot machines, eight additional table games, a poker room, 22-seat casino center bar, and a 1,500-space parking deck.

== Features and design ==
=== Architecture ===
The hotel is seven-story tall and has 300 rooms.

=== Games ===
The casino has 50,000 square feet (4,600 m^{2}) of gaming space, where it has over one thousand video poker and gaming machines; traditional table games including blackjack, roulette, baccarat, and craps; and a sportsbook.

=== Amenities ===
The casino has one full-service restaurant, The Landing Café, and a food court that includes the Earl of Sandwich, co-branded Nathan's Famous/Arthur Treacher's, Moe's Southwest Grill, Panda Express, and Starbucks.

== See also ==
- Gambling in North Carolina
- Caesars Southern Indiana
- Harrah's Cherokee
