= Harrah's Cherokee =

Casino and hotel in North Carolina, United States

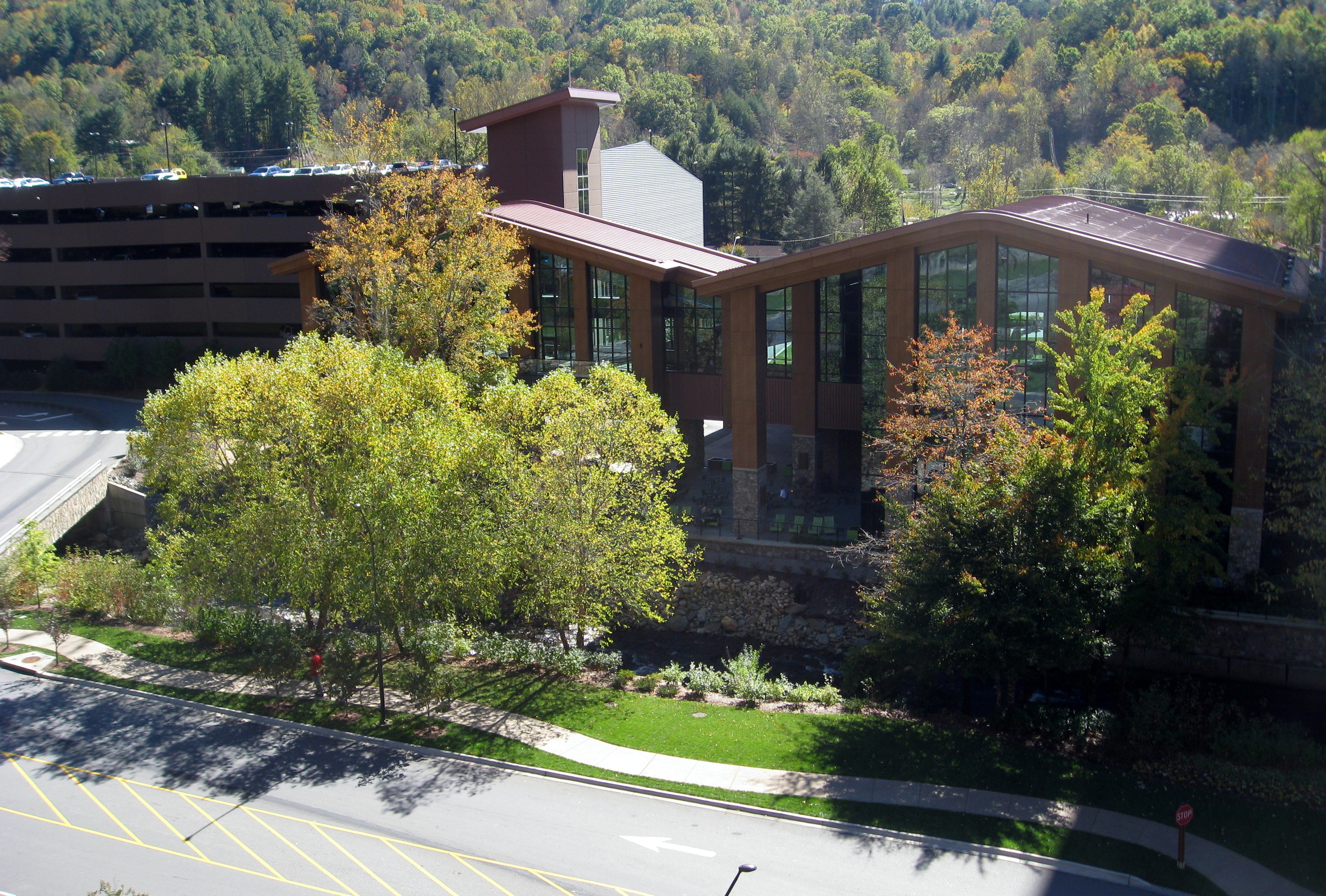
- Interactive map of Harrah's Cherokee
- Location: Cherokee, North Carolina; 777 Casino Drive; 35.46983°N 83.304807°W
- Opened: November 13, 1997
- No. of rooms: 1,833
- Gaming space: 150,000 sq ft (14,000 m^{2})
- Signature attractions: Cherokee Convention Center
- Notable restaurants: Ruth's Chris Steak House
- Casino type: Land-based
- Owner: EBCI Holdings, LLC
- Architect: Cuningham Group Architecture
- Previous names: Cherokee Tribal Casino
- Renovated in: 2002, 2005, 2013, 2021
- Website: harrahscherokee.com

Harrah's Cherokee Casino Resort is a casino and hotel on the Qualla Boundary in Cherokee, North Carolina, United States. It is owned by the Eastern Band of Cherokee Indians (EBCI) and operated by Caesars Entertainment. It is located on the site of the former Frontier Land theme park.

== History ==
Proposed in 1994, soon after a compact between the State of North Carolina and the EBCI to establish a casino with Class III gaming, Harrah's Cherokee Casino was opened on November 13, 1997. Owned by the EBCI and managed by Harrah's Entertainment, the casino offered 24-hour video poker and gaming machines that was legal for those 18 years-of-age and older. Occupying a major market niche as the closest gambling outlet for multiple large cities (chiefly Atlanta but also Charlotte and the Research Triangle), the casino was a proven success from day one and has greatly improved living standards on the Qualla Boundary, including a new school, a hospital, public housing, and upgrades to public safety services such as police, fire, and EMS. Also, part of the casino's revenue is distributed directly to all members of the EBCI, in a form of basic income. In 2001, an amendment to the compact was made that raised the legal gambling age from 18 to 21.

In 2002, the first renovation was completed, which included an expansion of 22,025 square feet (2,046.2 m^{2}) of additional gaming space, 31,000 square feet (2,900 m^{2}) of convention space and a 252-room hotel. In 2005, the second renovation was completed, which included an additional 15-story tower with approximately 320 rooms.

In 2009, alcohol sales at the tribe casino was approved by voters, with the first sales starting September; however legal issues with the state delayed sales on the gaming floor until December. In 2020, the EBCI passed the brunch bill, which allowed for alcohol sales to start at 10 a.m., instead of Noon, on Sunday.

On August 21, 2012, Harrah's Cherokee began offering live table games thanks to an amendment of the compact between the state of North Carolina and the EBCI. Harrah's officials related that around 500 new jobs were created thanks to the addition of live table games.

The third renovation, from 2009-2013 at a cost of $650 million, added a 21-story third tower with approximately 532 rooms and five suites, while also nearly doubling the gaming space to more than 150,000 square feet (14,000 m^{2}). A 3,000-seat events center, opened in 2010, provides an area for trade shows, poker tournaments, and concerts. A 16,000 square foot (1,500 m^{2}) full-service spa, open in 2012, and several new shops and restaurants were added, including Ruth's Chris Steak House, Paula Deen's Kitchen and a 600-seat buffet. Designed by Cuningham Group Architecture Inc., with Turner Construction Company as lead general builders of the project. In Summer 2013, Paula Deen's Kitchen was closed, and later rebranded, after Caesars Entertainment Corporation cut ties with Paula Deen due to a controversy regarding Deen's admission of using a racial slur in a social media post.

In 2020, because of the COVID-19 pandemic, Harrah's Cherokee was closed on March 18 as a precautionary measure; on May 18 it was reopened at limited capacity. On August 11, 2021, all visitors and staff were required to show proof of vaccination or a negative result from a COVID-19 test taken within 72 hours.

The fourth renovation, from 2018-2021 at a cost of $250 million, added a 19-story fourth tower with approximately 725 rooms and seven suites, a 83,000 square foot (7,700 m^{2}) convention center with ballroom, a new two-story, open-air lobby, a new terrace pool and fitness center, and new dining options including Wicked Weed Brewpub and Guy Fieri's Cherokee Kitchen + Bar. Also added were two new gaming areas in the casino, including the 34-table World Series of Poker Room and a new sports betting area, called the Book, which features 90 feet (27 m) of television screens. In December 2021, celebrity chef Gordon Ramsay announced the opening of the first Gordon Ramsay Food Market, which will have full-service dining from breakfast to late-night, in early 2022. Also in the same month, the EBCI passed a bill making Harrah's Cherokee a mostly non-smoking venue.

=== Frontier Land ===
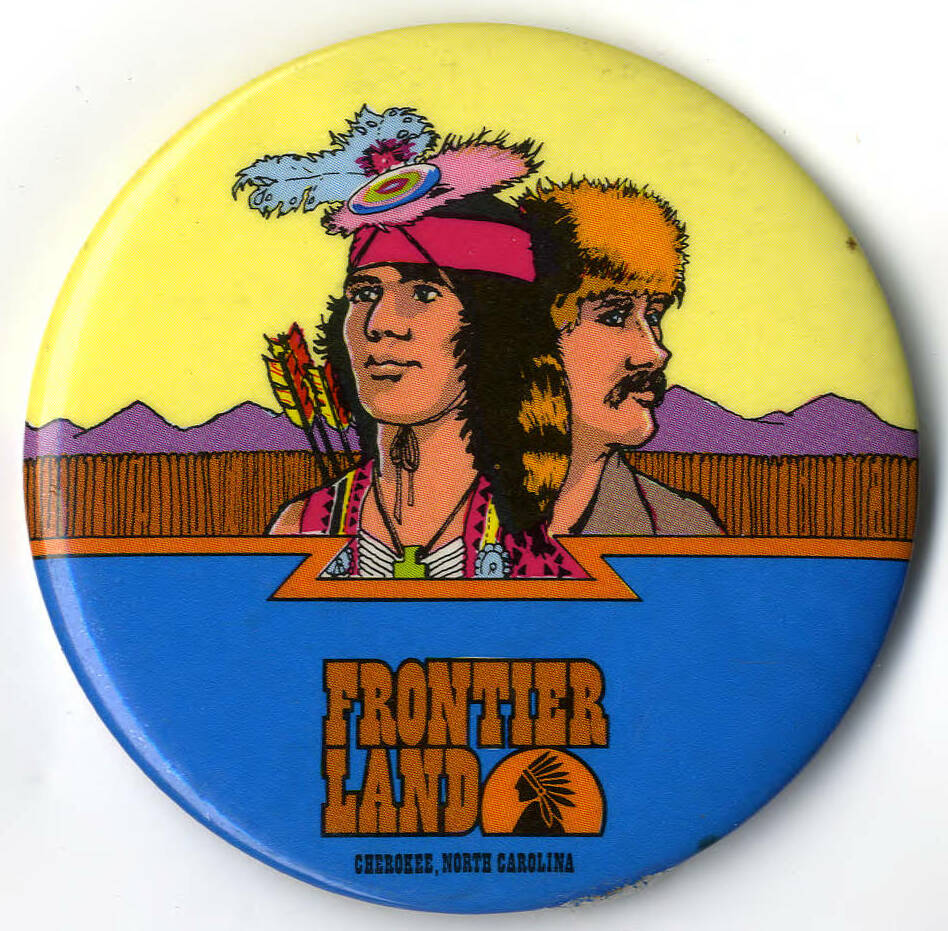

Prior to Harrah's Cherokee, the land it now sits on used to be that of a former wild west-themed amusement park called Frontier Land, from 1964–1982. The park was created by R.B. Coburn, who also built Ghost Town in the Sky in Maggie Valley, and designed by Russell Pearson, a former Disney designer who also developed Frontier City in Oklahoma City, Silver Dollar City in Branson, and Ghost Town in the Sky. The 140-acre (57 ha) park featured a wood-burning steam train and a gondola that would take visitors to the main three sections of the park: Indian Territory, Fort Cherokee (a replica of a frontier stockade), and Deadwood Gulch (an 1860s hardscrabble western town). By the mid-1980s, because of low attendance, the park was renovated and rebranded as a water amusement park called Water World (with unmistakable western touches). In 1986, the park was closed for the last time and abandoned until redevelopment in mid-1990s.

== Features and design ==
=== Hotel ===
Harrah's Cherokee has four hotel towers (Creek Tower, Soco Tower, Mountain Tower and the Cherokee) with a total of 1,833 rooms, making Harrah's Cherokee the largest hotel in North Carolina.

=== Casino ===
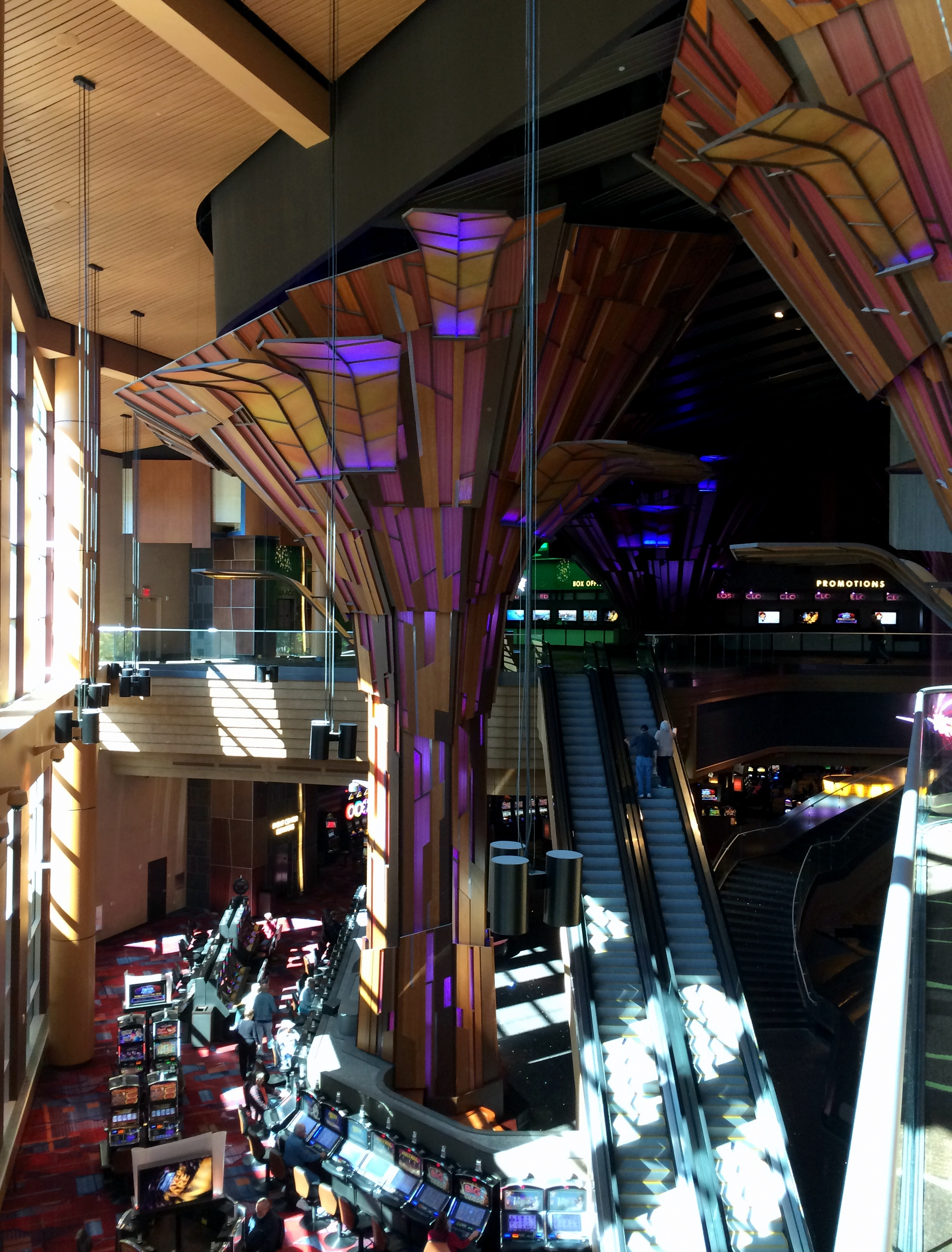
Harrah's Cherokee lobby

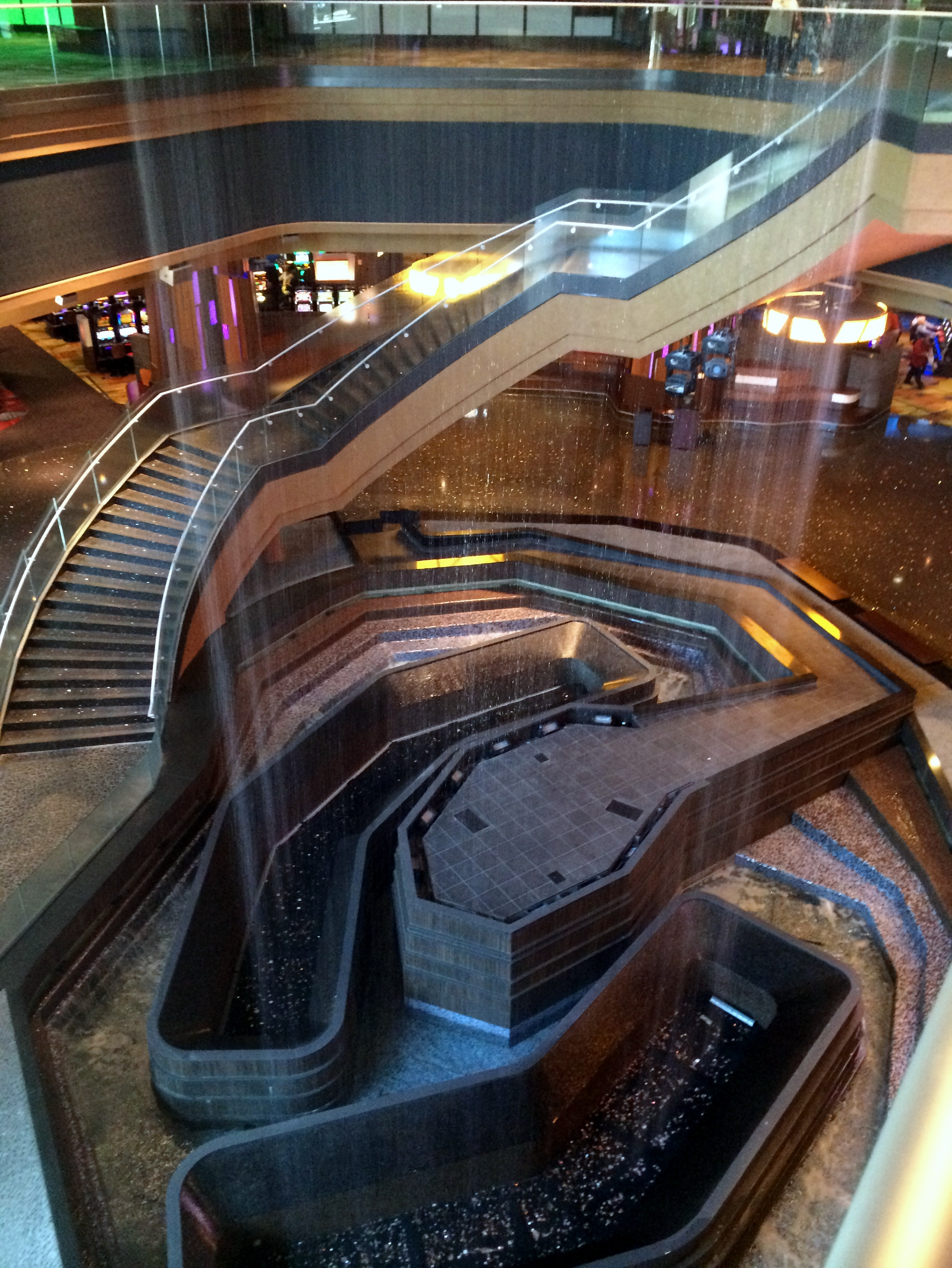
Harrah's Cherokee lobby

Since the tribe's compact with North Carolina restricts the types of gaming permitted, most of the games offered have significant differences with those found in other casinos. The compact with North Carolina requires games to have an element of skill. For most of the video slot machines, this means that after an initial spin of the reels, the player is allowed to lock selected reels in place and spin again, holding reels with valuable symbols in hopes of matching them up with winning symbols on the second spin. (This differs from "regular" slot machines, in which the reels usually spin only once after credits are played, although video poker everywhere allows players to hold cards before the second spin.)

The casino now has converted many of their slot machines to "Cherokee Raffle Reels," which require the player to insert their Total Rewards slot card into the machine before playing. This raffle entry is considered to be the second chance to win required by law, and has allowed the casino to phase out many of the "lock-and-roll" style machines for traditional video and reel slot machines.

The tribe reached an agreement with the state on November 25, 2011, to allow live cards at Harrah's Cherokee. The casino began introducing live table games in 2012. As of summer 2014, there are over 100 table games. No-limit hold'em tournaments are run daily, including larger buy-in deep stack tourneys on the weekends. The casino also regularly hosts World Series of Poker circuit events in the Events Center which feature a variety of tournaments and concurrent cash games.

=== Amenities ===
The Harrah's Cherokee complex includes a 15,000 sq ft (1,400 m^{2}) conference center, a 3,000-seat events center, a Sports book, a workout room, a lobby cafe, and a food court with restaurants.

== See also ==
- Gambling in North Carolina
- Caesars Southern Indiana
- Harrah's Cherokee Valley River
