= Skilo =

Skilo is a game, similar to bingo, where the player pays a fee and throws a small rubber ball into a container divided into numbered sections for the chance to win money. The game and games like it are illegal in Massachusetts (unless run by the state lottery). Although briefly made illegal in 1953 in New Jersey, a 1963 postcard from Wildwood, New Jersey shows a whole building devoted to the game along its boardwalk, and another building for the game existed in 1962 in the Olympic Park near Irvington and Maplewood, New Jersey.
