= North Carolina Education Lottery =

US state lottery

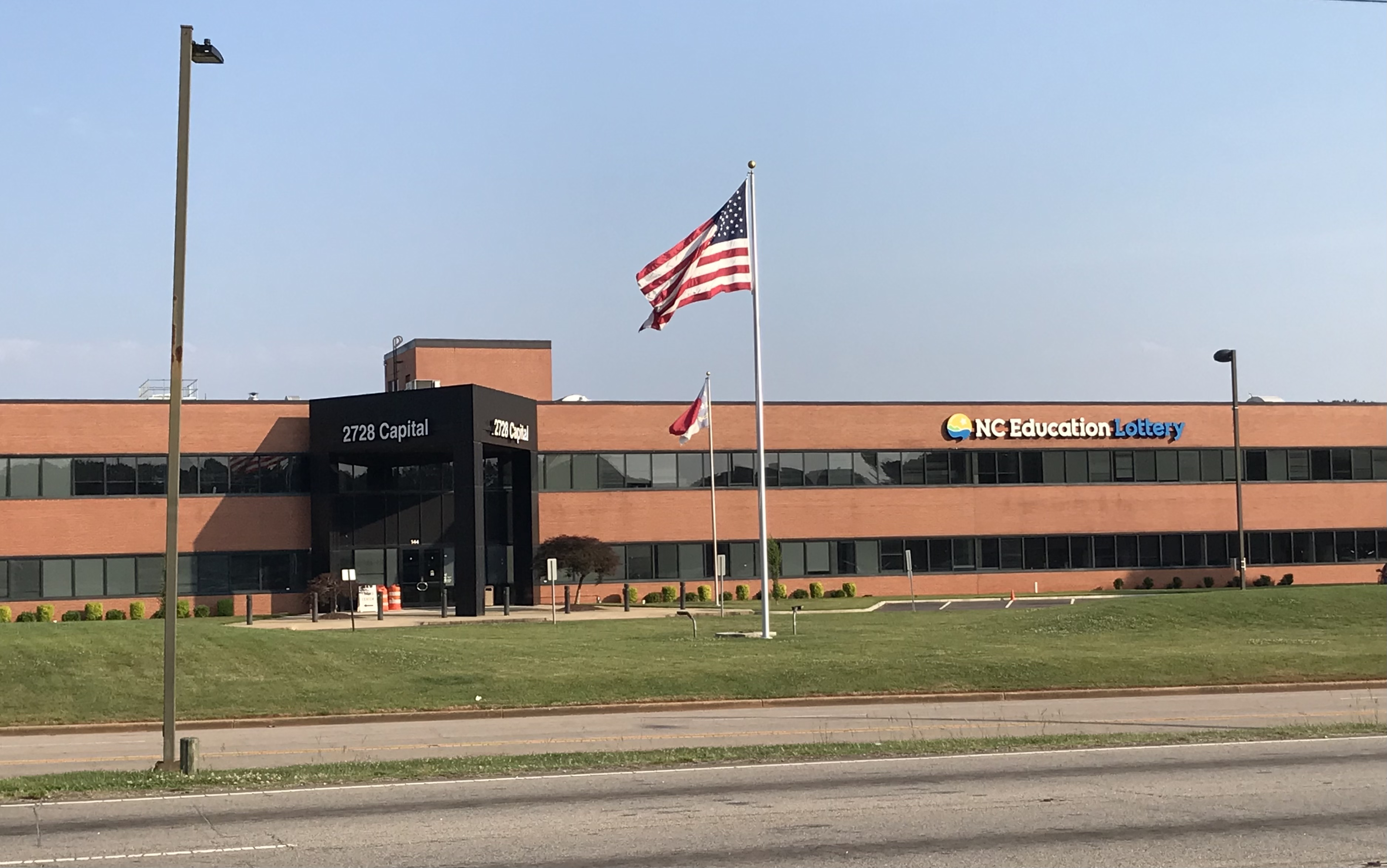
North Carolina Education Lottery Building

North Carolina has one of the United States' youngest lottery systems, having been enacted in 2005. The North Carolina State Lottery Act created the 9-member Lottery commission who was charged with overseeing all aspects of the education lottery. 100% of North Carolina Lottery net proceeds go directly to benefit the state's education, with the current figure sitting at more than $10 billion since its inception in 2006. By law, lottery funds go to pay for school construction, need-based college financial aid, transportation, salaries for non-instructional support staff, and pre-kindergarten for at-risk four-year-olds. The State Lottery Act outlines how each and every dollar produced by the lottery will be spent. The revenue distributions are as follows: 51% was paid out in prizes, 38% was transferred into the education fund, 7% was paid to the retailers who sold lottery tickets, and 4% went to general lottery expenses.

The controversial lottery proposal was approved on August 31, 2005, after then-Lieutenant Governor Bev Perdue cast a tie-breaking vote in the North Carolina Senate.

== History ==
North Carolina, traditionally associated with the Bible Belt, was the only state on the East Coast without a lottery. The issue divided lawmakers and the public alike. At the time, the opposition of nearly every Republican and a minority of Democratic lawmakers (consisting of progressives) made the passage of a lottery unlikely. These groups denounced the lottery as a regressive tax on the poor. However, on August 30, 2005, two lottery opponents (Harry Brown, R-Jacksonville and John Garwood, R-North Wilkesboro) had excused absences. With this known, a special vote was called, which was 24-24. Lt. Gov. Perdue cast the tiebreaking vote, signaling the way for Gov. Easley to sign it into law. The vote would have been defeated had the absent senators paired their votes.

== "Education" Controversy ==
In February 2009, to reduce a budget shortfall, Gov. Perdue withheld approximately $88 million to fill shortfalls in the North Carolina budget. Perdue emptied the $50 million lottery reserve, also withholding $38 million allocated for a school construction budget in direct conflict with the mandate of the NCEL. This controversial move by the Governor prompted North Carolina lawmakers on March 10, 2009, to propose a name change to the NCEL, to remove "Education" from its name.

== Proceeds and payouts ==
- Seven percent is paid to retailers as commission.
- fifty one percent is paid as winnings to players.
- four percent is cost-of-sales.
- The remaining 38% goes to education proceeds, broken down as follows:
  - Before any proceeds are paid, 5% of the proceeds goes to the Education Lottery Reserve Fund to be used when lottery proceeds fall short. This fund may not exceed $100 million.
  - Fifty percent of the remainder goes towards the reduction of class sizes.
  - Forty percent of the remainder is used for school construction.
    - Sixty-five percent of the above is distributed based on school enrollment.
    - The remaining 35% is distributed to counties with effective property tax rates above North Carolina's average based on school enrollment.
  - Ten percent of the remainder is distributed for college scholarships, to be used with the federal Pell Grant.

Originally, North Carolina's scratch tickets had an overall payout of 52%, the lowest among scratch tickets then available through US lotteries. While its $1 instant tickets continue to pay out at roughly this level, its newer $2-and-up games now have higher-percentage payouts.

The Lottery has continued to generate controversy among North Carolina constituents upset with teacher layoffs who believed the Lottery should have made up the difference.

== Television ==
Live Lottery drawings are broadcast on these TV stations:

- WRAL-TV in Raleigh
- WITN-TV in eastern North Carolina
- WAXN-TV in Charlotte
- WILM-LD in Wilmington
- WLOS in Asheville (2011-)
- WGHP in Greensboro/Winston-Salem/High Point

There are no designated stations for the Florence/Myrtle Beach or Hampton Roads markets, both covering portions of North Carolina.

- WYCW in Asheville showed the lottery results from 2006 to 2011. The drawings were moved to WLOS on March 28, 2011.

== Current draw games ==
=== In-house draw games ===
==== Carolina Pick 3 ====
This game began on October 6, 2006, as a game that was only drawn nightly prior to March 30, 2008. Carolina Pick 3 is drawn twice daily (prior to February 27, 2011, it was drawn only once Sundays). Carolina Pick 3 draws three balls, each numbered 0 through 9. Players can wager in 50 cent increments that the number drawn is in exact order, or in any order. Another option is "50/50", which is a $1.00 bet consisting of an "Exact" wager and an "Any" wager. The other options are "Combo", which is a $1.50, $3 or a $6 wager (depending on the number of straight combinations), and pair play which allows players to pick 1 number in either the first two or the last two columns (the two numbers selected in their specific location must match the two numbers drawn exactly to win a prize). The game pays up to $500. It's statistically harder to match the winning numbers in the exact order in the drawing so the prizes that the players can win on a "Straight" bet are bigger.

==== Carolina Pick 4 ====
Began on April 17, 2009, Carolina Pick 4 also is twice daily (prior to February 27, 2011, it was drawn once nightly). Otherwise, it is similar to Carolina Pick 3, except it draws four digits. A "Combo" wager is a $4, $6, $12, or $24 bet depending on the combinations. A $1 "Straight" bet wins $5,000 if the numbers selected match exactly. The play type options for this game are the same as the pick 3 game. Players face the odds of 1 in 10,000 of winning the top prize on the straight play.

=== Fireball ===
On September 18, 2022, the North Carolina education lottery has added fireball to its pick 3 and pick 4 games, replacing sum it up and 1 off. After each day and night pick 3 and pick 4 drawing the lottery draws one number from a separate machine that has 10 balls numbered 0-9 which is separate to each game. Players can use the fireball number to replace any one of the numbers drawn for pick 3 or pick 4 and create a fireball prize winning combination to win a fireball prize which is separate from the base game prize. Players can win multiple fireball prizes on the same ticket depending on the unique numbers selected. If a player wants to add fireball to their play, he/she must mark the spot on their ticket that says "add fireball". Doing so doubles the cost of the play and can be added to any pick 3 or pick 4 play type.

==== Carolina Cash 5 ====
Began on October 27, 2006, Carolina Cash 5 is drawn nightly. Prior to May 14, 2016 the game Drew 5 numbers from 1–39 with starting jackpots at $50,000 Cash. On May 14, 2016 the matrix changed to 5/41 and the starting jackpot stayed at $50,000. Before the November 4, 2018 revision, The prizes for matching 3 and 4 numbers were parimutuel. As of Sunday, November 4, 2018, it draws 5 numbers from 1 to 43 & the prizes for matching 3 & 4 numbers became fixed prizes. Cash Jackpots begin at $100,000 and grow until there is a 5-of-5 winner sometimes reaching $1 million. Games cost $1 each ($2 with an add on feature ez match (which improves top prize odds to 1 in 84,000 & overall odds to 1 in 4.71) $2 with double play, and $3 with ez match and double play). Overall odds of winning: 1 in 10.51; odds of winning the top prize: 1 in 962,598. Players can also purchase up to 28 consecutive drawings on each purchase. Players must match at least 2 out of the five numbers drawn in any order with the numbers on their cash five ticket for both the base game and the double play feature to win a prize. The payout for matching 2 of 5 numbers is $1; 3 of 5, $5; 4 of 5, $250, and the jackpot is parimutuel. On April 25, 2021, the NCEL introduced a Double Play add-on feature. This feature costs an additional $1 per play, and the Top prize in the Double Play feature is $50,000 (the top prize has a $250,000 liability limit for each drawing for each set of numbers) and is won by matching all five numbers in any order. The Double Play drawings take place before the Cash 5 drawings. The prizes for matching 2, 3, & 4 numbers on this feature are bigger than those in the main game with matching 2 numbers awarding $3, matching 3 numbers awarding $12 & matching 4 numbers awarding $500.

==== CASH POP ====
This game was released on November 17th, 2024. This game is played by picking 1 or more numbers (here called pops) from 1-15. The game offers 5 chances every day to win anywhere from 5-250 times the wager amount with one number drawn from 1-15 for each cash pop drawing.

=== Multi-jurisdictional games ===
==== Lucky for Life ====
Lucky for Life is a lottery drawing game available in 23 states and the District Of Columbia. Players select 5 numbers from 1-48 and a sixth number from 1–18. Prizes range from $3 to $1,000 per day, every day, for the winner's life. The player who wins the top prize or the second prize ($25,000 a year for life) may also choose an available cash option for such annuity. On Nov 27, 2021, a player accidentally purchased 2 identical sets of numbers and won 2 $25,000/year for life prizes.

==== Mega Millions ====
Mega Millions is offered in 45 states, the District of Columbia, and the U.S. Virgin Islands. Mega Millions began as part of the NCEL on January 31, 2010, as part of the cross-sell expansion with MUSL.

Mega Millions is drawn Tuesday and Friday nights at 11:00 p.m. Eastern Time in Atlanta Georgia.

==== Powerball ====
Powerball is offered in 45 states, the District of Columbia, and the U.S. Virgin Islands. Powerball began in 1992; NCEL joined on May 28, 2006. As of October 7, 2015, Players select five numbers 1 through 69, and the red Powerball (1-26). Jackpots begin at $40 million annuity. As of August 23, 2021, Drawings are Monday, Wednesday and Saturday.

=== Former Games ===
==== Monopoly Millionaires Club ====
North Carolina was among 23 participating states to offer this multi state game which started on October 19, 2014. players picked 5 #s from 1-52 for the white balls and 1 bonus number from 1-28. The top prize was $5,750,000 which was paid out in a financial annuity or the top prize winner may choose the lump sum of $4,000,000 for such annuity. The game was discontinued after the DEC 26, 2014 drawing due to poor sales. The game was discontinued in 2016 in its entirety.

==== All or Nothing ====
This game began on September 7, 2014. The format of this game was the same as the Texas Lottery version of the game, similarly players got 2 sets of numbers on each panel for $2. The top prize on this game was a fixed top prize at $250,000 (with a $5 million liability limit). Other than the top prize for the game, there were 4 prizes: $500, $50, $10 & $2. In May 2016, the lottery announced that the game would end with the Thursday, June 30, 2016, drawing. The lottery has ended the game because of its performance after citing that it would join the multi state Lucky For Life game earlier in the year.

== See also ==
- Gambling in North Carolina
- Lotteries in the United States

== Further sources ==
- "Lottery Opponenets Outmaneuvered". Legislation Information Network. 31 August 2005. Accessed 4 June 2006.
- Mouskourie, Diane. "The Wrong Number?". The Daily News (Jacksonville, NC). 7 May 2006. Accessed 4 June 2006.
