= South Central Junior-Senior High School (Union Mills, Indiana) =

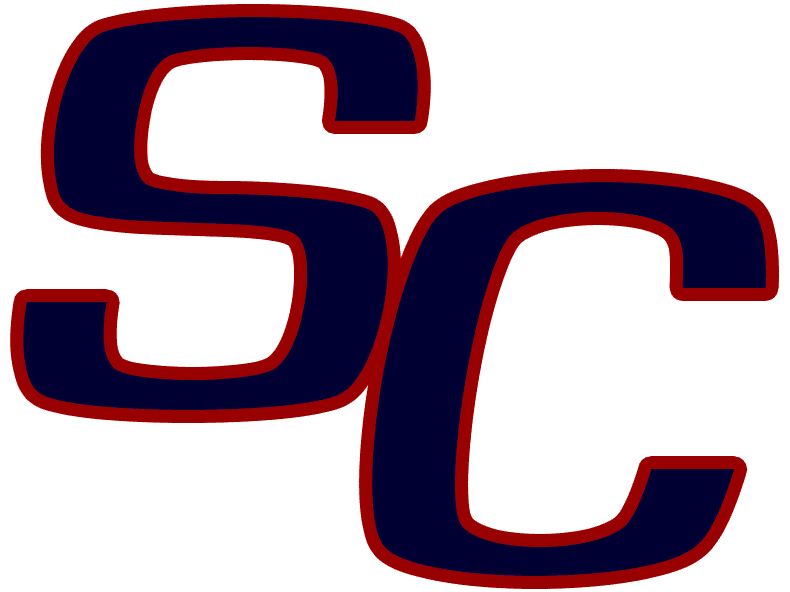

Location
- 9808 South 600 West; Union Mills, LaPorte County, Indiana 46382; United States; 41.465344°N 86.814932°W

Information
- Type: Public high school
- School district: South Central Community School Corporation
- Superintendent: Ben Anderson
- Dean: Melissa Santana
- Principal: Nick Mills
- Faculty: 32.50 (FTE) (2023-2024)
- Grades: 7-12
- Enrollment: 455 (2023-2024)
- Student to teacher ratio: 15.25 (2022-2023)
- Hours in school day: 7
- Color
- Athletics conference: Porter County Conference Greater South Shore Athletic Conference
- Team name: Satellites
- Website: Official Website

South Central Junior-Senior High School is a public high school located in Union Mills, Indiana, United States.

== Notable alumni ==
- Sean Manaea – Major League Baseball player

== See also ==
- List of high schools in Indiana
