= Posey Township, Harrison County, Indiana =

Posey Township
- Township
- Coordinates: 38°07′56″N 85°57′22″W
- Country: United States
- State: Indiana
- County: Harrison

Government
  - Type: Indiana township

Area
  - Total: 39.67 sq mi (102.7 km^{2})
  - Land: 39.67 sq mi (102.7 km^{2})
  - Water: 0 sq mi (0 km^{2})
- Elevation: 781 ft (238 m)

Population (2020)
  - Total: 2,830
  - Density: 71.3/sq mi (27.5/km^{2})
- FIPS code: 18-61344
- GNIS feature ID: 453764

Posey Township is one of twelve townships in Harrison County, Indiana. As of the 2020 census, its population was 2,830 and it contained 1,205 housing units.

Historical population
Census	Pop.	Note	%±
1890	2,038		—
1900	2,062		1.2%
1910	1,859		−9.8%
1920	1,571		−15.5%
1930	1,303		−17.1%
1940	1,372		5.3%
1950	1,456		6.1%
1960	1,623		11.5%
1970	1,833		12.9%
1980	2,203		20.2%
1990	2,553		15.9%
2000	2,725		6.7%
2010	2,909		6.8%
2020	2,830		−2.7%
Source: US Decennial Census

== History ==
Posey township was named for Territorial Governor Thomas Posey.

The first settlers entered Posey Township in 1807. There were David and Joshua Farnsley in the north central part, Jacob Lutz and William Smith in the southeast along the Ohio, and General W. Johnson in the southwest, near present-day Rogers Campground.

Elizabeth was platted in 1812 making it the second oldest town in the county.

In 1998, Caesars Southern Indiana opened in Posey township near Bridgeport.

== Geography ==
According to the 2010 census, the township has a total area of 39.67 square miles (102.7 km^{2}), all land.
