= Union Mills, Indiana =

- Unincorporated community Census designated place
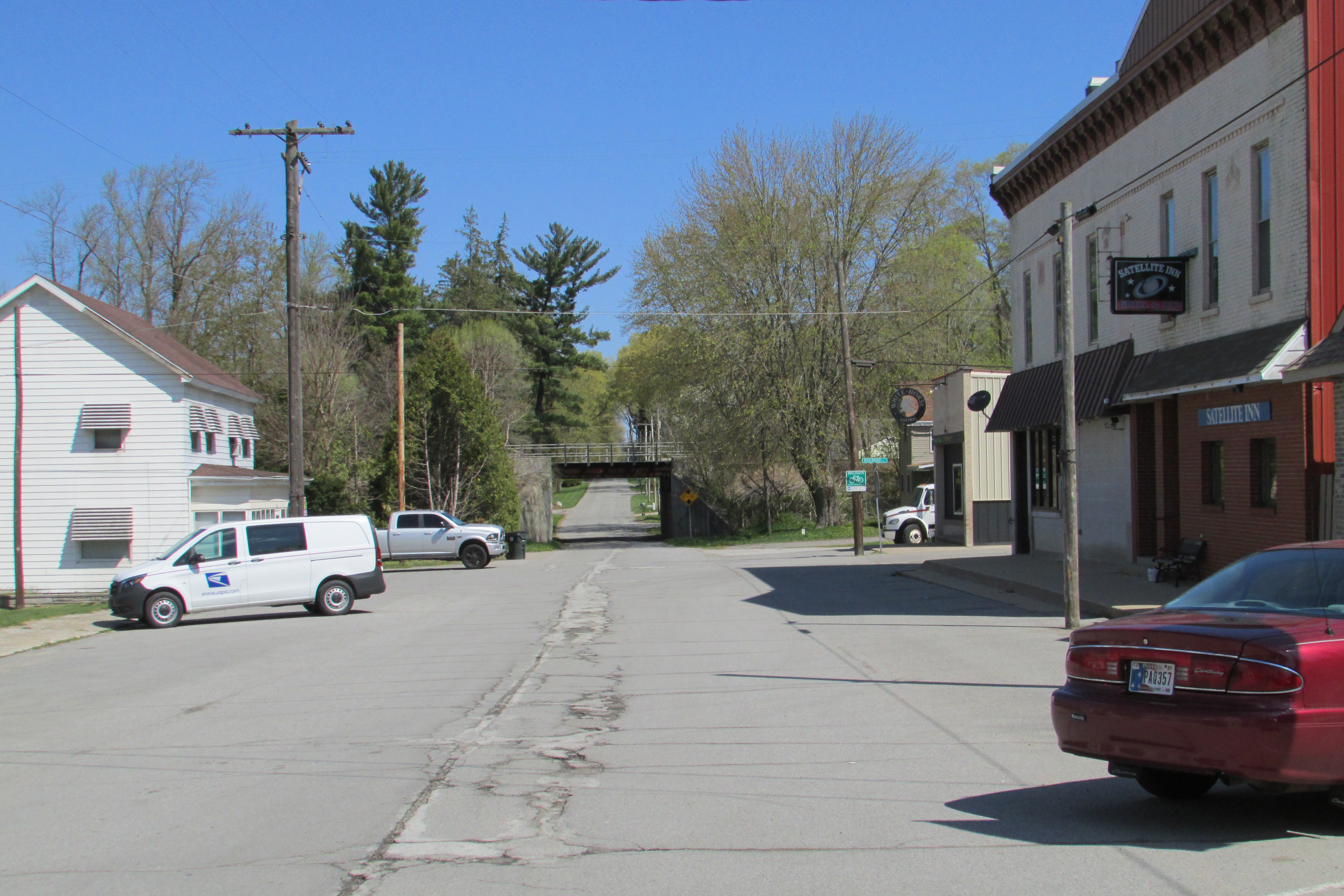
- Business district of Union Mills.

- Location within Indiana Location within the United States
- Coordinates: 41°29′39″N 86°46′43″W
- Country: United States
- State: Indiana
- County: LaPorte
- Township: Noble
- Elevation: 725 ft (221 m)
- ZIP code: 46382
- FIPS code: 18-77804
- GNIS feature ID: 2830447

Union Mills is an unincorporated community and census designated place (CDP) in Noble Township, LaPorte County, Indiana.

== History ==
Joseph Wheaton, one of the earliest settlers, came to the Mill Creek in 1832 and laid out a small village. The gristmill was built on Mill Creek was built in 1836 by Sylvanus Everts. Everts named the mill "Union Mills" and Wheaton's village followed to be known as Union Mills. In 1838 the village had only five log houses. A general store opened in 1840. The construction of three rail lines near Union Mills stimulated growth.

Union Mills was platted in 1849, but there had been a settlement at the site for some time prior. The community took its name from a gristmill constructed in the 1830s.

== Education ==
Union Mills has a public library, a branch of the LaPorte County Public Library.

Union Mills has a public school, South Central, not to be confused for another school called South Central in Elizabeth, Indiana, that provides education from Kindergarten through 12th grade.

== Demographics ==
=== ZIP Code Tabulation Area (ZCTA) ===
Since its founding in 1832, Union Mills has grown to about 2,000 people using the ZIP Code Tabulation Area (ZCTA), in which it lays.

Historical population
| Year | Pop. | ±% |
|---|---|---|
| 1880 | 238 | — |
| 1990 | 3,000 | +1160.5% |
| 2000 | 1,990 | −33.7% |
| 2010 | 2,108 | +5.9% |
| 2020 | 2,094 | −0.7% |
| 2023 | 1,839 | −12.2% |

=== Census designated place ===
Historical population
| Census | Pop. | Note | %± |
|---|---|---|---|
| 2023 (est.) | 159 |

The United States Census Bureau defined Union Mills as a census designated place in the 2022 American Community Survey which does not include more expansive area under ZCTA 46382.

== Notable people ==
- Thomas H. Everts, physician, politician, and newspaper editor; born in Union Mills
- Ed Hanyzewski, baseball player
- Glen Rosenbaum, baseball player and coach
