= Elizabeth, Indiana =

- Town
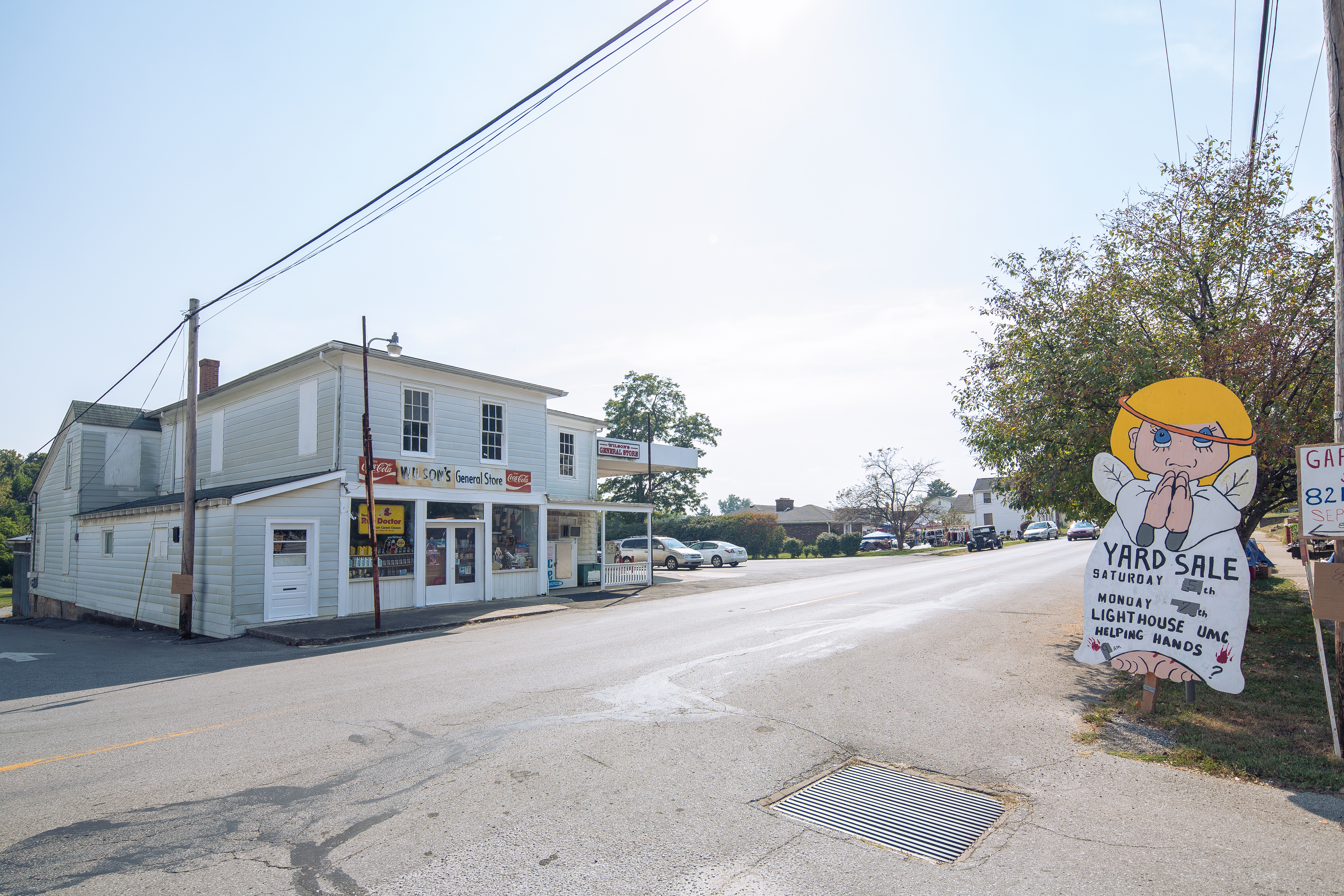

- Location of Elizabeth in Harrison County, Indiana.
- Coordinates: 38°7′27″N 85°58′25″W
- Country: United States
- State: Indiana
- County: Harrison
- Township: Posey

Area
  - Total: 0.26 sq mi (0.68 km^{2})
  - Land: 0.26 sq mi (0.68 km^{2})
  - Water: 0 sq mi (0.00 km^{2})
- Elevation: 781 ft (238 m)

Population (2020)
  - Total: 199
  - Density: 761.2/sq mi (293.91/km^{2})
- Time zone: UTC-5 (EST)
  - Summer (DST): UTC-4 (EDT)
- ZIP code: 47117
- Area code: 812
- FIPS code: 18-20674
- GNIS feature ID: 2396924
- Website: www.townofelizabeth.net

Elizabeth is a town in Posey Township, Harrison County, Indiana, United States. The population was 199 at the 2020 census.

== History ==
The original plat of the town of Elizabeth was recorded on April 17, 1812. It was witnessed by Sheriff John Tipton. The land for the town was donated by Capt. Jacob Zenor and wife Suzannah Muchendorffer Zenor. The town is named after Jacob's daughter-in-law Elizabeth Lemmon Zenor wife of George Zenor.

Rose Hill Cemetery, the second-largest cemetery in the county, is located on the west side of the town. The land for the cemetery was donated by Jacob Zenor and wife, with the only rule being that burial be made available regardless of the religious denomination of the deceased.

The town fire department was first organized by the town on December 29, 1959. The first fire engine was purchased in Corydon. It was a 1941 International Fire Truck, purchased for $200.

== Geography ==
Elizabeth is located at 38°7′27″N 85°58′25″W (38.124158, -85.973711). According to the 2010 census, Elizabeth has a total area of 0.17 square miles (0.44 km^{2}), all land.

=== Climate ===
The climate in this area is characterized by hot, humid summers and generally mild to cool winters. According to the Köppen Climate Classification system, Elizabeth has a humid subtropical climate, abbreviated "Cfa" on climate maps.

== Government ==
The Town of Elizabeth is governed by a three-member Town Council.

Elizabeth Clerk Treasurer Hugh Burns standing in front of the Elizabeth Town Hall

== Demographics ==
Historical population
Census	Pop.	Note	%±
1870	216		—
1880	282		30.6%
1890	267		−5.3%
1900	271		1.5%
1910	238		−12.2%
1920	193		−18.9%
1930	178		−7.8%
1940	209		17.4%
1950	211		1.0%
1960	214		1.4%
1970	195		−8.9%
1980	178		−8.7%
1990	153		−14.0%
2000	137		−10.5%
2010	162		18.2%
2020	199		22.8%
U.S. Decennial Census

=== 2010 census ===
As of the census of 2010, there were 162 people, 62 households, and 44 families living in the town. The population density was 952.9 inhabitants per square mile (367.9/km^{2}). There were 73 housing units at an average density of 429.4 per square mile (165.8/km^{2}). The racial makeup of the town was 96.3% White, 1.2% African American, 0.6% Native American, 1.2% from other races, and 0.6% from two or more races. Hispanic or Latino of any race were 1.2% of the population.

There were 62 households, of which 37.1% had children under the age of 18 living with them, 53.2% were married couples living together, 9.7% had a female householder with no husband present, 8.1% had a male householder with no wife present, and 29.0% were non-families. 24.2% of all households were made up of individuals, and 14.5% had someone living alone who was 65 years of age or older. The average household size was 2.61 and the average family size was 3.16.

The median age in the town was 33.9 years. 27.2% of residents were under the age of 18; 7.5% were between the ages of 18 and 24; 27.8% were from 25 to 44; 18.5% were from 45 to 64; and 19.1% were 65 years of age or older. The gender makeup of the town was 49.4% male and 50.6% female.

=== 2000 census ===
As of the census of 2000, there were 137 people, 53 households, and 36 families living in the town. The population density was 997.1 inhabitants per square mile (385.0/km^{2}). There were 59 housing units at an average density of 429.4 per square mile (165.8/km^{2}). The racial makeup of the town was 98.54% White, 0.73% from other races, and 0.73% from two or more races. Hispanic or Latino of any race were 0.73% of the population.

There were 53 households, of which 32.1% had children under the age of 18 living with them, 56.6% were married couples living together, 11.3% had a female householder with no husband present, and 30.2% were non-families. 26.4% of all households were made up of individuals, and 18.9% had someone living alone who was 65 years of age or older. The average household size was 2.58 and the average family size was 3.16.

The age distribution of the town was 27.0% under 18, 7.3% from 18 to 24, 26.3% from 25 to 44, 21.9% from 45 to 64, and 17.5% 65 or older. The median age was 37 years. For every 100 females, there were 80.3 males. For every 100 females age 18 and over, there were 75.4 males.

The median income for a household in the town was $31,563, and the median income for a family was $38,250. Males had a median income of $23,523 versus $19,063 for females. The per capita income for the town was $15,208. There were 8.6% of families and 10.2% of the population living below the poverty line, including no under eighteens and 31.1% of those over 64.

== Education ==
The first school in Elizabeth was a single room log cabin built around 1833. Around 1890, seminary education first became available at Clay Hill College in downtown Elizabeth. The college was later moved and the high school eventually took over the building around 1908. The first graduation was held on April 13, 1912. The high school burned down in 1935. In 1936 Posey Township completed construction of a new brick school building. The building is still in use today, owned and operated by a local civic non-profit organization. The town's school children now attend South Central Jr/Sr High School and South Central Elementary, which serve the entire south-eastern portion of Harrison County. The school's name, South Central, should not be confused with another school named South Central in Union Mills, Indiana.

Elizabeth has a public library, a branch of the Harrison County Public Library.
