= South Central Junior & Senior High School =

Location
- 6675 East Highway 11 SE; Elizabeth, Harrison County, Indiana 47117; United States; 38.081935°N 86.001836°W

Information
- Type: Public high school
- Established: 1958
- School district: South Central Community School Corporation
- Principal: Jenna Hinkle
- Faculty: 23.83 (FTE)
- Grades: 7-12
- Enrollment: 269 (2023-2024)
- Student to teacher ratio: 11.29
- Color
- Athletics: Track and Field, Volleyball, Tennis, Cross Country Running, Basketball
- Athletics conference: Southern
- Team name: Rebels
- Website: Official Site

South Central Jr/Sr High School is a public high school serving the students of Laconia and Elizabeth and the surrounding townships.

== About ==
The school is built adjacent to South Central Elementary School, in south central Harrison County, Indiana, United States. The school had 432 students enrolled during the 2007–2008 school year. During the 2007–2008 school year, the school was staffed by 25 teachers and four administrators. The school has a 96% graduation rate.

== See also ==
- List of high schools in Indiana
