= National Register of Historic Places listings in Crawford County, Indiana =

Location of Crawford County in Indiana

This is a list of the National Register of Historic Places listings in Crawford County, Indiana.

This is intended to be a complete list of the properties and districts on the National Register of Historic Places in Crawford County, Indiana, United States. Latitude and longitude coordinates are provided for many National Register properties and districts; these locations may be seen together in a map.

There are two properties and districts listed on the National Register in the county.

Properties and districts located in incorporated areas display the name of the municipality, while properties and districts in unincorporated areas display the name of their civil township. Properties and districts split between multiple jurisdictions display the names of all jurisdictions.

This National Park Service list is complete through NPS recent listings posted August 29, 2025.

== Current listings ==
	Name on the Register	Image	Date listed	Location	City or town	Description
1	Potts Creek Rockshelter Archeological Site (12CR110)	Potts Creek Rockshelter Archeological Site (12CR110)	April 11, 1986 (#86003174)	Address Restricted	Union Township	
2	William Proctor House	William Proctor House	June 25, 2013 (#13000419)	7037 State Road 64, east of Marengo; 38°22′00″N 86°19′40″W	Liberty Township	

== See also ==
- List of National Historic Landmarks in Indiana
- National Register of Historic Places listings in Indiana
- Listings in neighboring counties: Dubois, Harrison, Meade (KY), Orange, Perry, Washington
- List of Indiana state historical markers in Crawford County
