= List of Indiana state historical markers in Crawford County =

Location of Crawford County in Indiana

This is a list of the Indiana state historical markers in Crawford County.

This is intended to be a complete list of the official state historical markers placed in Crawford County, Indiana, United States by the Indiana Historical Bureau. The locations of the historical markers and their latitude and longitude coordinates are included below when available, along with their names, years of placement, and topics as recorded by the Historical Bureau. There are 4 historical markers located in Crawford County.

== Historical markers ==
Marker title	Image	Year placed	Location	Topics
Leavenworth		1992	Junction of State Road 62 and West Street, on the northern side of highway on a grassy median near the general store and post office 38°12′1″N 86°20′43″W	Transportation, Historic District, Neighborhoods, and Towns
Early Mining At Wyandotte Caves		1992	Along the Wyandotte Cave entrance road, 0.5 miles north of State Road 62 and 5 miles east of Leavenworth; 38°13′46″N 86°17′37″W	Nature and Natural Disasters, Business, Industry, and Labor
Hines' Raid		1992	State Road 62 near Dry Run and Old Town Leavenworth Roads, near Leavenworth; 38°11′57″N 86°20′28″W	Military
Marengo Academy		2006	Meridian Road near Old Main Street in Marengo; 38°22′41″N 86°20′53″W	Education

== See also ==
- List of Indiana state historical markers
- National Register of Historic Places listings in Crawford County, Indiana
