= Boone Township, Indiana =

Boone Township is the name of six townships in the U.S. state of Indiana:

- Boone Township, Cass County, Indiana
- Boone Township, Crawford County, Indiana
- Boone Township, Dubois County, Indiana
- Boone Township, Harrison County, Indiana
- Boone Township, Madison County, Indiana
- Boone Township, Porter County, Indiana

== See also ==
- Boone Township (disambiguation)
