= Ohio Township, Indiana =

Ohio Township is the name of four townships in Indiana:

- Ohio Township, Bartholomew County, Indiana
- Ohio Township, Crawford County, Indiana
- Ohio Township, Spencer County, Indiana
- Ohio Township, Warrick County, Indiana
