= Boone Township, Arkansas =

Boone Township, Arkansas may refer to:

- Boone Township, Logan County, Arkansas
- Boone Township, Union County, Arkansas

== See also ==
- List of townships in Arkansas
- Boone Township (disambiguation)
