= Cape Sandy, Indiana =

Cape Sandy
- Unincorporated community
- Location within Crawford County, Indiana
- Coordinates: 38°09′03″N 86°22′15″W
- Country: United States
- State: Indiana
- County: Crawford
- Township: Ohio
- Elevation: 742 ft (226 m)
- ZIP code: 47137
- FIPS code: 18-10180
- GNIS feature ID: 432118

Cape Sandy is an unincorporated community in Ohio Township, Crawford County, Indiana.

== History ==
A post office was established at Cape Sandy in 1877, and remained in operation until it was discontinued in 1965.

== See also ==
- List of cities and towns along the Ohio River
