= Jennings Township, Crawford County, Indiana =

Jennings Township
- Township
- Location of Jennings Township in Crawford County
- Coordinates: 38°14′06″N 86°21′04″W
- Country: United States
- State: Indiana
- County: Crawford

Government
  - Type: Indiana township

Area
  - Total: 45.12 sq mi (116.9 km^{2})
  - Land: 44.92 sq mi (116.3 km^{2})
  - Water: 0.2 sq mi (0.52 km^{2})
- Elevation: 748 ft (228 m)

Population (2020)
  - Total: 1,458
  - Density: 32.46/sq mi (12.53/km^{2})
- FIPS code: 18-38394
- GNIS feature ID: 453506

Jennings Township is one of nine townships in Crawford County, Indiana. As of the 2020 census, its population was 1,458 and it contained 677 housing units.

Historical population
| Census | Pop. | Note | %± |
|---|---|---|---|
| 1890 | 2,224 | | — |
| 1900 | 2,104 | | −5.4% |
| 1910 | 1,875 | | −10.9% |
| 1920 | 1,644 | | −12.3% |
| 1930 | 1,403 | | −14.7% |
| 1940 | 1,209 | | −13.8% |
| 1950 | 1,195 | | −1.2% |
| 1960 | 1,088 | | −9.0% |
| 1970 | 952 | | −12.5% |
| 1980 | 1,285 | | 35.0% |
| 1990 | 1,235 | | −3.9% |
| 2000 | 1,386 | | 12.2% |
| 2010 | 1,436 | | 3.6% |
| 2020 | 1,458 | | 1.5% |
Source: US Decennial Census

== Geography ==
According to the 2010 census, the township has a total area of 45.12 square miles (116.9 km^{2}), of which 44.92 square miles (116.3 km^{2}) (or 99.56%) is land and 0.2 square miles (0.52 km^{2}) (or 0.44%) is water. Spring Lake is in this township.

=== Cities and towns ===
- Leavenworth

=== Unincorporated towns ===
- Curby
- Magnolia
- Wyandotte

(This list is based on USGS data and may include former settlements.)

=== Adjacent townships ===
- Whiskey Run Township (northeast)
- Harrison Township, Harrison County (east)
- Spencer Township, Harrison County (east)
- Ohio Township (southwest)
- Sterling Township (northwest)

=== Major highways ===
- Interstate 64
- Indiana State Road 62
- Indiana State Road 66

=== Cemeteries ===
The township contains three cemeteries: Everton, Leavenworth Memorial Garden and Old Leavenworth.
