= Liberty Township, Indiana =

Liberty Township is the name of eighteen townships in the U.S. state of Indiana:

- Liberty Township, Carroll County, Indiana
- Liberty Township, Crawford County, Indiana
- Liberty Township, Delaware County, Indiana
- Liberty Township, Fulton County, Indiana
- Liberty Township, Grant County, Indiana
- Liberty Township, Hendricks County, Indiana
- Liberty Township, Henry County, Indiana
- Liberty Township, Howard County, Indiana
- Liberty Township, Parke County, Indiana
- Liberty Township, Porter County, Indiana
- Liberty Township, St. Joseph County, Indiana
- Liberty Township, Shelby County, Indiana
- Liberty Township, Tipton County, Indiana
- Liberty Township, Union County, Indiana
- Liberty Township, Wabash County, Indiana
- Liberty Township, Warren County, Indiana
- Liberty Township, Wells County, Indiana
- Liberty Township, White County, Indiana
