= Temple, Indiana =

Temple
- Unincorporated community
- Location within Crawford County, Indiana
- Coordinates: 38°20′40″N 86°24′57″W
- Country: United States
- State: Indiana
- County: Crawford
- Township: Sterling
- Elevation: 584 ft (178 m)
- ZIP code: 47118
- FIPS code: 18-75266
- GNIS feature ID: 444626

Temple is an unincorporated community in Sterling Township, Crawford County, Indiana, United States.

== History ==
Temple was laid out by James L. Temple, and named for him.

A post office was established at Temple in 1884, and remained in operation until it was discontinued in 1940.
