= Taswell, Indiana =

Taswell
- Census-designated place
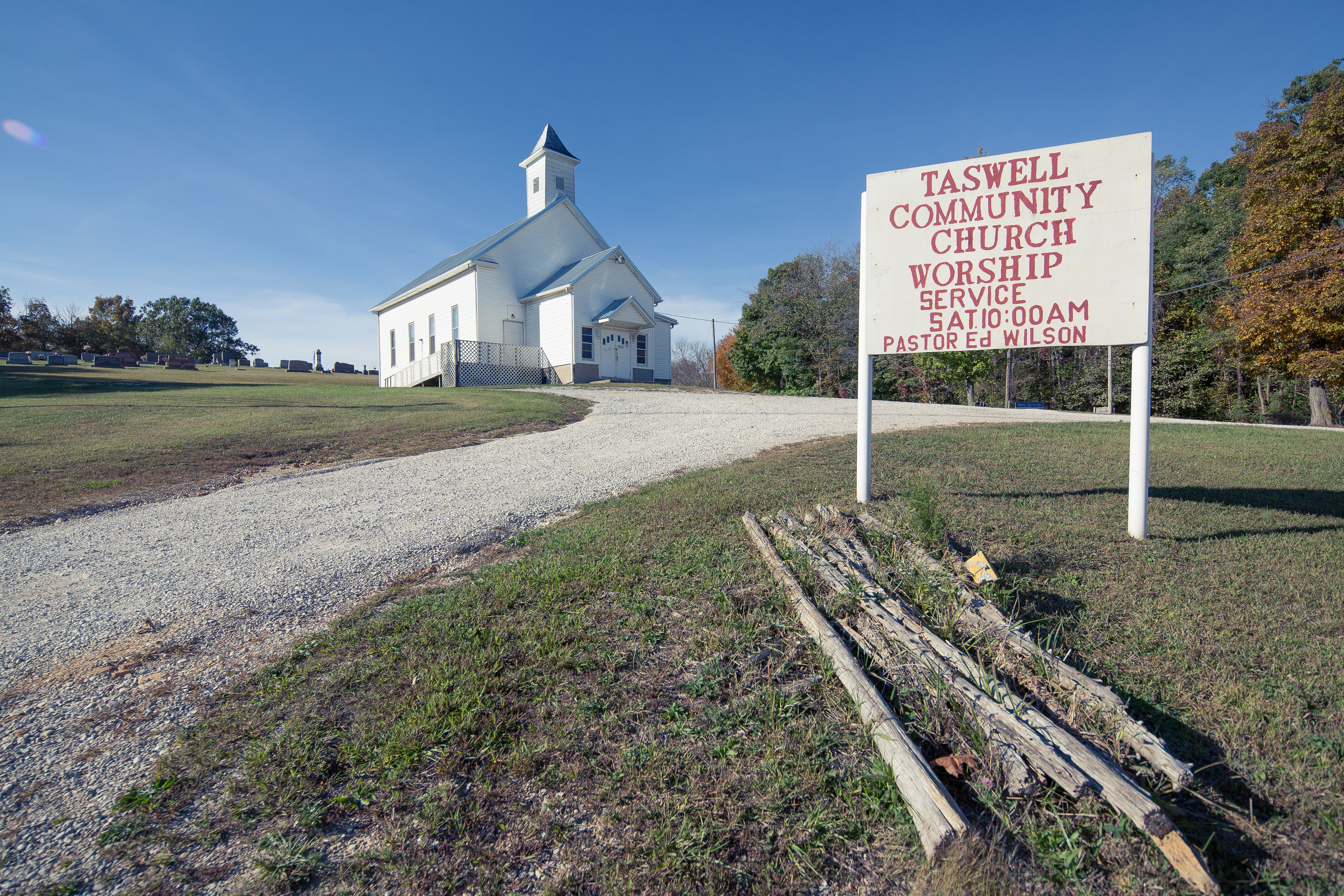

- Location within Crawford County, Indiana
- Coordinates: 38°20′08″N 86°33′35″W
- Country: United States
- State: Indiana
- County: Crawford
- Township: Patoka
- Elevation: 771 ft (235 m)
- ZIP code: 47175
- GNIS feature ID: 2830348

Taswell is a census-designated place in Patoka Township, Crawford County, Indiana, located on State Road 64 west of the county seat of English.

== History ==
A post office was established at Taswell in 1882, and remained in operation until it was discontinued in 1996. It was intended that the community be named for the Laswell family of settlers, but when the postal authorities misspelled the name Taswell, the new name stuck.

== Demographics ==
Historical population
Census	Pop.	Note	%±
2023 (est.)	64

The United States Census Bureau defined Taswell as a census designated place in the 2022 American Community Survey.
