= Ohio Township, Crawford County, Indiana =

Ohio Township
- Township
- Location of Ohio Township in Crawford County
- Coordinates: 38°11′57″N 86°24′57″W
- Country: United States
- State: Indiana
- County: Crawford

Government
  - Type: Indiana township

Area
  - Total: 30.73 sq mi (79.6 km^{2})
  - Land: 30.1 sq mi (78 km^{2})
  - Water: 0.62 sq mi (1.6 km^{2})
- Elevation: 594 ft (181 m)

Population (2020)
  - Total: 653
  - Density: 21.7/sq mi (8.38/km^{2})
- Zip Code: 47118
- Zip Code: 47137
- FIPS code: 18-56142
- GNIS feature ID: 453683

Ohio Township is one of nine townships in Crawford County, Indiana. As of the 2020 census, its population was 653 and it contained 329 housing units.

Historical population
Census	Pop.	Note	%±
1890	1,199		—
1900	1,133		−5.5%
1910	883		−22.1%
1920	774		−12.3%
1930	683		−11.8%
1940	794		16.3%
1950	555		−30.1%
1960	490		−11.7%
1970	467		−4.7%
1980	508		8.8%
1990	568		11.8%
2000	689		21.3%
2010	742		7.7%
2020	653		−12.0%
Source: US Decennial Census

== Geography ==
According to the 2010 census, the township has a total area of 30.73 square miles (79.6 km^{2}), of which 30.1 square miles (78 km^{2}) (or 97.95%) is land and 0.62 square miles (1.6 km^{2}) (or 2.02%) is water.

=== Unincorporated towns ===
- Artist Point
- Beechwood
- Cape Sandy
- Fredonia
- Jericho
- Riddle
- Schooler Point Landing
- Switzer Crossroads

(This list is based on USGS data and may include former settlements.)

=== Adjacent townships ===
- Sterling Township (north)
- Jennings Township (northeast)
- Harrison Township, Harrison County (east)
- Boone Township (southwest)
- Oil Township, Perry County (west)
- Union Township (northwest)

=== Major highways ===
- Interstate 64
- Indiana State Road 62

=== Cemeteries ===
The township contains one cemetery, Wiseman.
