= Sterling Township, Crawford County, Indiana =

Sterling Township
- Township
- Location of Sterling Township in Crawford County
- Coordinates: 38°20′12″N 86°27′13″W
- Country: United States
- State: Indiana
- County: Crawford

Government
  - Type: Indiana township

Area
  - Total: 48.47 sq mi (125.5 km^{2})
  - Land: 48.41 sq mi (125.4 km^{2})
  - Water: 0.07 sq mi (0.18 km^{2})
- Elevation: 509 ft (155 m)

Population (2020)
  - Total: 1,603
  - Density: 33.11/sq mi (12.78/km^{2})
- FIPS code: 18-73016
- GNIS feature ID: 453873

Sterling Township is one of nine townships in Crawford County, Indiana. As of the 2020 census, its population was 1,603 and it contained 804 housing units.

Historical population
Census	Pop.	Note	%±
1890	2,200		—
1900	2,486		13.0%
1910	2,078		−16.4%
1920	1,854		−10.8%
1930	1,865		0.6%
1940	1,913		2.6%
1950	1,799		−6.0%
1960	1,563		−13.1%
1970	1,560		−0.2%
1980	1,799		15.3%
1990	1,743		−3.1%
2000	1,668		−4.3%
2010	1,635		−2.0%
2020	1,603		−2.0%
Source: US Decennial Census

== Geography ==
According to the 2010 census, the township has a total area of 48.47 square miles (125.5 km^{2}), of which 48.41 square miles (125.4 km^{2}) (or 99.88%) is land and 0.07 square miles (0.18 km^{2}) (or 0.14%) is water. Bluegill Pond and Grant Lake are in this township.

=== Cities and towns ===
- English

=== Unincorporated towns ===
- Temple

(This list is based on USGS data and may include former settlements.)

=== Adjacent townships ===
- Southeast Township, Orange County (northeast)
- Liberty Township (east)
- Whiskey Run Township (east)
- Jennings Township (southeast)
- Ohio Township (south)
- Union Township (southwest)
- Patoka Township (west)
- Greenfield Township, Orange County (northwest)

=== Major highways ===
- Indiana State Road 37
- Indiana State Road 64

=== Cemeteries ===
The township contains nine cemeteries: Cunningham, Denbo, Grant, Hamilton, Land, Purkhiser, Seton, Sloan and Stewart.
