= Sulphur, Indiana =

Sulphur
- Unincorporated community
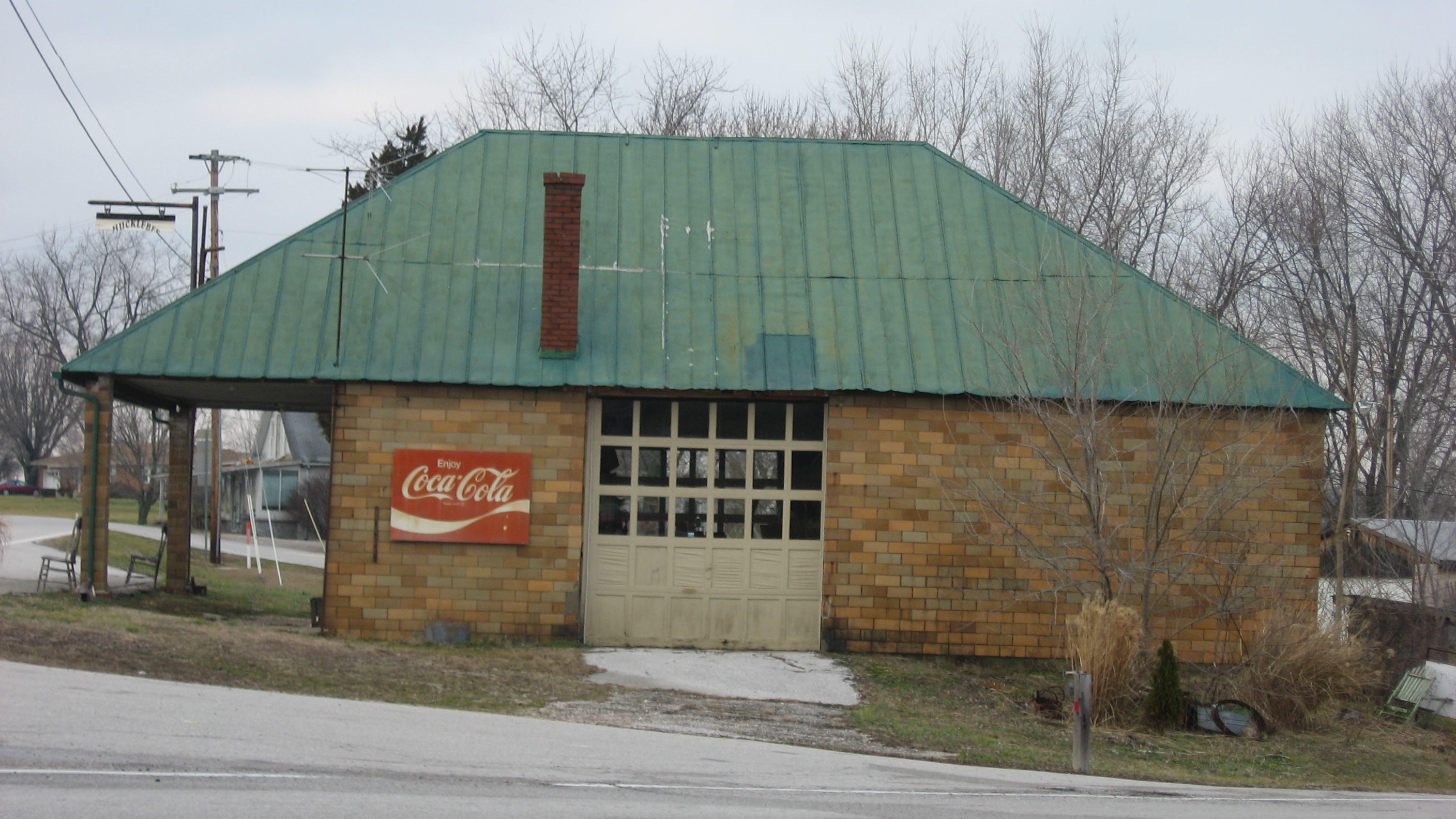
- A former gas station at Sulphur

- Location within Crawford County, Indiana
- Coordinates: 38°13′39″N 86°28′15″W
- Country: United States
- State: Indiana
- County: Crawford
- Township: Union
- Elevation: 712 ft (217 m)
- ZIP code: 47174
- FIPS code: 18-74024
- GNIS feature ID: 451522

Sulphur is an unincorporated community in Union Township, Crawford County, Indiana.

Sulphur contained the White Sulphur Well which was noted for the quality of the mineral water it produced.

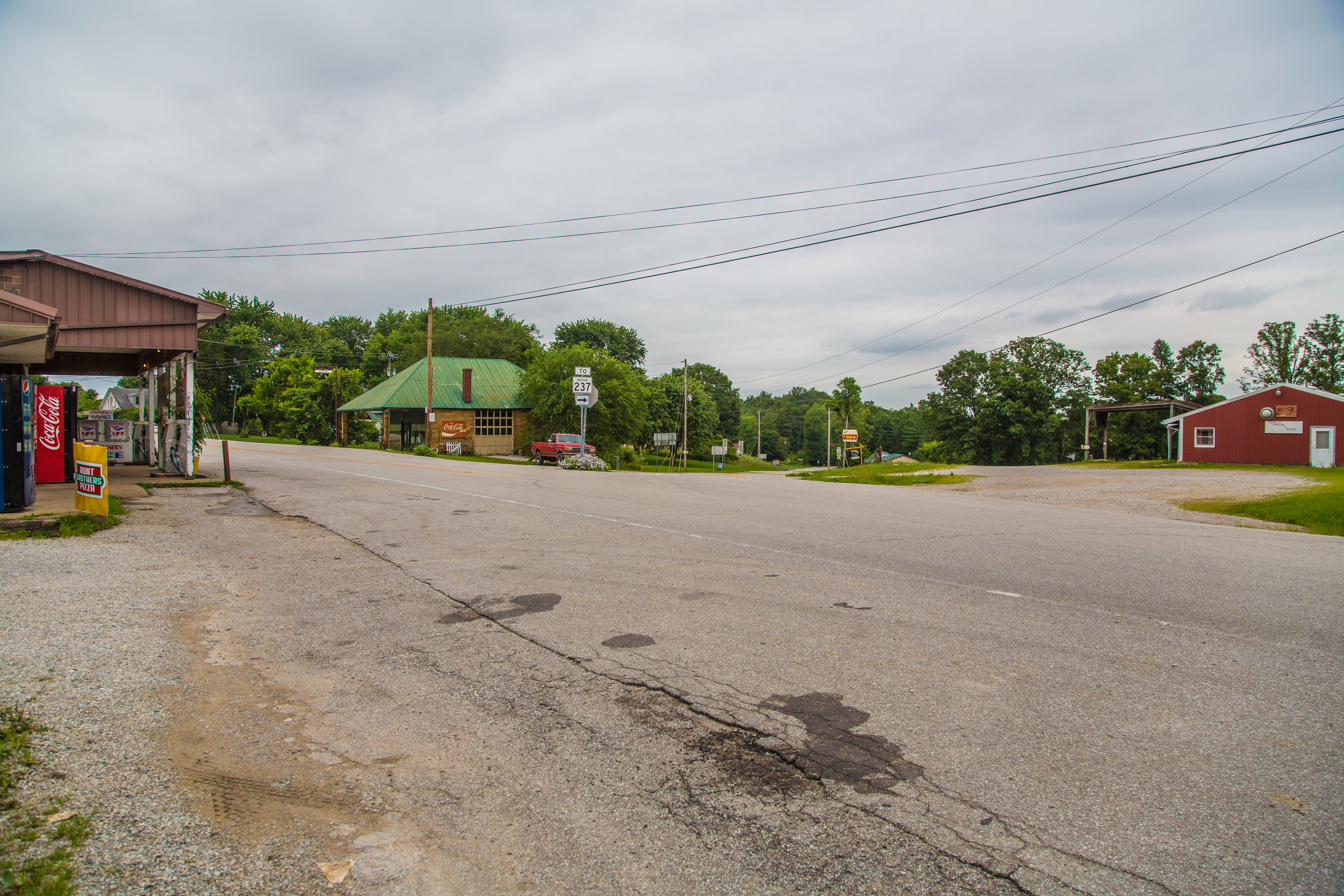
Sulphur, Indiana
