= Wickliffe, Indiana =

Wickliffe
- Unincorporated community
- Location within Crawford County, Indiana
- Coordinates: 38°22′06″N 86°38′28″W
- Country: United States
- State: Indiana
- County: Crawford
- Township: Patoka
- Elevation: 725 ft (221 m)
- ZIP code: 47116
- FIPS code: 18-84140
- GNIS feature ID: 451625

Wickliffe is an unincorporated community in Patoka Township, Crawford County, Indiana.

== History ==
Wickliffe had a post office between 1842 and 1952. According to one source, it was named for John Wycliffe.
