= Alton, Indiana =

- Town
- Location of Alton in Crawford County, Indiana.
- Coordinates: 38°07′16″N 86°25′10″W
- Country: United States
- State: Indiana
- County: Crawford
- Township: Boone
- Established: 1838

Area
  - Total: 0.20 sq mi (0.51 km^{2})
  - Land: 0.17 sq mi (0.45 km^{2})
  - Water: 0.023 sq mi (0.06 km^{2})
- Elevation: 407 ft (124 m)

Population (2020)
  - Total: 29
  - Density: 168.6/sq mi (65.11/km^{2})
- Time zone: UTC-5 (EST)
  - Summer (DST): UTC-4 (EDT)
- ZIP code: 47137
- Area code: 812
- FIPS code: 18-01270
- GNIS ID: 2397425

Alton is a town in Boone Township, Crawford County, Indiana, United States. The population was 29 at the 2020 census.

== History ==
Alton was founded in 1838.

Alton was called Nebraska in its early years. The Nebraska post office opened in 1847, and was renamed Alton in 1860. The post office in Alton was finally discontinued in 1965.

== Geography ==
According to the 2010 census, Alton has a total area of 0.19 square miles (0.49 km^{2}), of which 0.17 square miles (0.44 km^{2}) (or 89.47%) is land and 0.02 square miles (0.05 km^{2}) (or 10.53%) is water.

== Demographics ==
Historical population
Census	Pop.	Note	%±
1870	137		—
1880	259		89.1%
1890	277		6.9%
1900	238		−14.1%
1910	161		−32.4%
1920	128		−20.5%
1930	109		−14.8%
1940	78		−28.4%
1950	71		−9.0%
1960	57		−19.7%
1970	56		−1.8%
1980	64		14.3%
1990	57		−10.9%
2000	53		−7.0%
2010	55		3.8%
2020	29		−47.3%
US Decennial Census

=== 2010 census ===
As of the 2010 census, there were 55 people, 25 households, and 19 families residing in the town. The population density was 323.5 inhabitants per square mile (124.9/km^{2}). There were 55 housing units at an average density of 323.5 per square mile (124.9/km^{2}). The racial makeup of the town was 96.4% White and 3.6% from other races. Hispanic or Latino of any race were 3.6% of the population.

There were 25 households, of which 24.0% had children under the age of 18 living with them, 52.0% were married couples living together, 12.0% had a female householder with no husband present, 12.0% had a male householder with no wife present, and 24.0% were non-families. 20.0% of all households were made up of individuals, and 4% had someone living alone who was 65 years of age or older. The average household size was 2.20 and the average family size was 2.37.

The median age in the town was 53.2 years. 10.9% of residents were under the age of 18; 11% were between the ages of 18 and 24; 14.6% were from 25 to 44; 40% were from 45 to 64; and 23.6% were 65 years of age or older. The gender makeup of the town was 56.4% male and 43.6% female.

=== 2000 census ===
As of the 2000 census, there were 53 people, 24 households, and 16 families residing in the town. The population density was 312.3 inhabitants per square mile (120.6/km^{2}). There were 65 housing units at an average density of 383.0 per square mile (147.9/km^{2}). The racial makeup of the town was 100.00% White.

There were 24 households, out of which 29.2% had children under the age of 18 living with them, 54.2% were married couples living together, 12.5% had a female householder with no husband present, and 33.3% were non-families. 29.2% of all households were made up of individuals, and 12.5% had someone living alone who was 65 years of age or older. The average household size was 2.21 and the average family size was 2.75.

The population age spread was 22.6% under the age of 18, 9.4% from 18 to 24, 28.3% from 25 to 44, 26.4% from 45 to 64, and 13.2% who were 65 years of age or older. The median age was 38 years. For every 100 females, there were 96.3 males. For every 100 females age 18 and over, there were 86.4 males.

The median income for a household in the town was $19,375, and the median income for a family was $29,375. Males had a median income of $41,250 versus $11,250 for females. The per capita income for the town was $11,167. There were 7.7% of families and 9.3% of the population living below the poverty line, including 21.4% of under eighteens and none of those over 64.

== See also ==
- List of cities and towns along the Ohio River
