= Union Township, Crawford County, Indiana =

Union Township
- Township
- Location of Union Township in Crawford County
- Coordinates: 38°14′59″N 86°31′25″W
- Country: United States
- State: Indiana
- County: Crawford

Government
  - Type: Indiana township

Area
  - Total: 42.4 sq mi (110 km^{2})
  - Land: 42.4 sq mi (110 km^{2})
  - Water: 0 sq mi (0 km^{2})
- Elevation: 551 ft (168 m)

Population (2020)
  - Total: 734
  - Density: 17.3/sq mi (6.68/km^{2})
- FIPS code: 18-77210
- GNIS feature ID: 453911

Union Township is one of nine townships in Crawford County, Indiana. As of the 2020 census, its population was 734 and it contained 384 housing units.

Historical population
Census	Pop.	Note	%±
1890	1,726		—
1900	1,398		−19.0%
1910	1,265		−9.5%
1920	1,153		−8.9%
1930	1,069		−7.3%
1940	1,050		−1.8%
1950	864		−17.7%
1960	787		−8.9%
1970	717		−8.9%
1980	861		20.1%
1990	863		0.2%
2000	838		−2.9%
2010	761		−9.2%
2020	734		−3.5%
Source: US Decennial Census

== History ==
The Potts Creek Rockshelter was listed on the National Register of Historic Places in 1987.

== Geography ==
According to the 2010 census, the township has a total area of 42.4 square miles (110 km^{2}), all land.

=== Unincorporated towns ===
- Grantsburg
- Mifflin
- Sulphur
- West Fork

(This list is based on USGS data and may include former settlements.)

=== Adjacent townships ===
- Sterling Township (northeast)
- Ohio Township (southeast)
- Oil Township, Perry County (southwest)
- Johnson Township (west)
- Patoka Township (northwest)

=== Major highways ===
- Interstate 64
- Indiana State Road 37
- Indiana State Road 62
- Indiana State Road 66

=== Cemeteries ===
The township contains five cemeteries: Doan, Fessler, Goad, Hedden, Mifflin, and Keysacker.
