= Magnolia, Indiana =

Unincorporated community in Indiana, U.S.

Coordinates: 38°14′57″N 86°23′35″W

Magnolia is an unincorporated community in Crawford County, Indiana, in the United States. Magnolia was platted in 1838. A post office was established at Magnolia in 1848, and remained in operation until it was discontinued in 1937.
