= Grantsburg, Indiana =

Grantsburg
- Census-designated place
- Location within Crawford County, Indiana
- Coordinates: 38°17′29″N 86°28′14″W
- Country: United States
- State: Indiana
- County: Crawford
- Township: Union
- Elevation: 581 ft (177 m)
- ZIP code: 47123
- FIPS code: 18-28908
- GNIS feature ID: 2830347

Grantsburg is an unincorporated community and Census-designated place in Union Township, Crawford County, Indiana.

== History ==
Grantsburg was laid out in 1854.

The Grantsburg post office (spelled Grantsburgh in early years) was established in 1854. John V. Grant was an early postmaster.

== Demographics ==
The United States Census Bureau delineated Grantsburg as a census designated place in the 2022 American Community Survey.
