= West Fork, Indiana =

West Fork
- Unincorporated community
- Location within Crawford County, Indiana
- Coordinates: 38°14′01″N 86°31′35″W
- Country: United States
- State: Indiana
- County: Crawford
- Township: Union
- Elevation: 515 ft (157 m)
- ZIP code: 47118
- FIPS code: 18-82718
- GNIS feature ID: 451618

West Fork is an unincorporated community in Union Township, Crawford County, Indiana.

== History ==
West Fork was named for the fork in the river nearby. The first post office at West Fork opened in 1871.
