= 144th Indiana Infantry Regiment =

- Active: March 6 – August 5, 1865
- Disbanded: August 5, 1865
- Country: United States
- Allegiance: Union
- Branch: Infantry
- Size: Regiment (Note: According to W.H.H. Terrell (1867), The Report of the Adjutant General of the State of Indiana. Containing Rosters for the Years 1861–1865, Volume 7, the 144th Indiana Infantry Regiment was composed of ten companies. Companies "A" to "I" and "K".)
- Engagements: American Civil War

Commanders
- Colonel: George Washington Riddle
- Lt. Colonel: Henry C. Ferguson
- Major: Thomas Clark

The 144th Indiana Infantry Regiment was an infantry regiment from Indiana that served in the Union Army between March 6 and August 5, 1865, during the American Civil War.

== Service ==
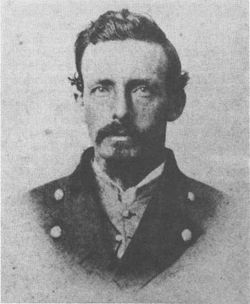
Colonel George Washington Riddle of Riddle, Indiana.

The regiment was organized at Indianapolis, Indiana, with a strength of 1,036 men and mustered in on March 6, 1865. The 144th was composed of companies raised in the 2nd district and it left Indiana for Harper's Ferry, West Virginia, on March 9. The regiment was attached to the 1st Brigade, 1st Provisional Division, Army of the Shenandoah. Duty was performed at Halltown and Charleston, West Virginia, prior to serving in Winchester, Stevenson's Depot and Opequon Creek, Virginia until early August. The regiment was mustered out on August 5, 1865. During its service the regiment incurred forty-six fatalities, another nineteen deserted and one unaccounted for.

== See also ==
- List of Indiana Civil War regiments

== Bibliography ==
- Dyer, Frederick H. (1959). A Compendium of the War of the Rebellion. New York and London. Thomas Yoseloff, Publisher. LCCN 59-12963.
- Holloway, William R. (2004). Civil War Regiments From Indiana. eBookOnDisk.com Pensacola, Florida. ISBN 1-9321-5731-X.
- Terrell, W.H.H. (1867). The Report of the Adjutant General of the State of Indiana. Containing Rosters for the Years 1861–1865, Volume 7. Indianapolis, Indiana. Samuel M. Douglass, State Printer.
