= Boon Township =

Boon Township may refer to the following places in the United States:

- Boon Township, Indiana
- Boon Township, Michigan
- Boon Lake Township, Minnesota

== See also ==
- Boone Township (disambiguation)
