= Riddle, Indiana =

Riddle
- Unincorporated community
- Location within Crawford County, Indiana
- Coordinates: 38°15′02″N 86°25′50″W
- Country: United States
- State: Indiana
- County: Crawford
- Township: Ohio
- Elevation: 761 ft (232 m)
- ZIP code: 47118
- FIPS code: 18-64332
- GNIS feature ID: 441984

Riddle is an unincorporated community in Ohio Township, Crawford County, Indiana.

== History ==
A post office was established at Riddle in 1892, and remained in operation until it was discontinued in 1951. It was named for Colonel George Washington Riddle.
