= Curby, Indiana =

Curby
- Unincorporated community
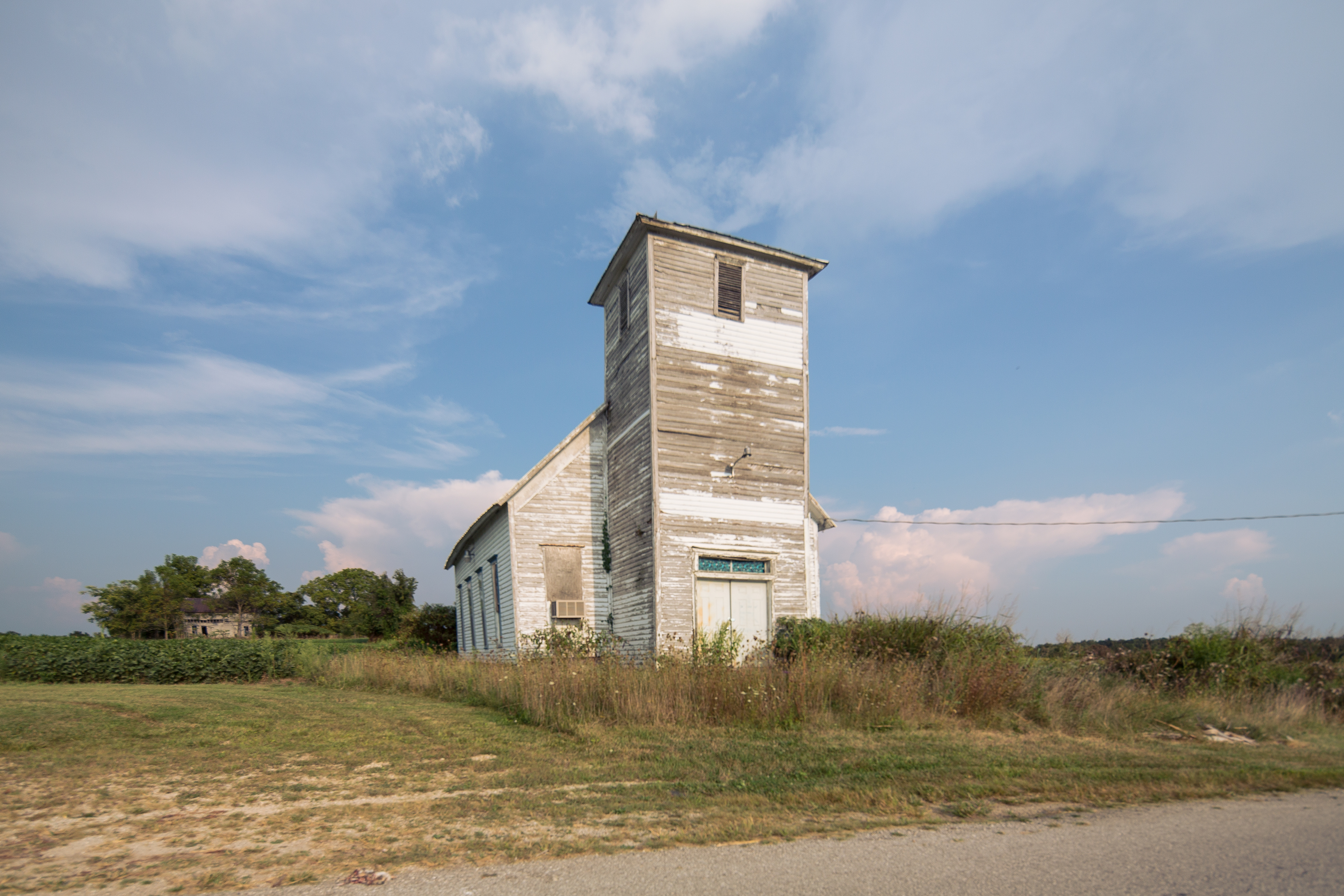

- Location within Crawford County, Indiana
- Coordinates: 38°17′15″N 86°22′38″W
- Country: United States
- State: Indiana
- County: Crawford
- Township: Jennings
- Elevation: 764 ft (233 m)
- ZIP code: 47118
- FIPS code: 18-16372
- GNIS feature ID: 433254

Curby is an unincorporated community in Jennings Township, Crawford County, Indiana. It is a populated place that is not incorporated and has no legal boundaries.

== History ==
A post office was established at Curby in 1904, and remained in operation until it was discontinued in 1915. The community was named after the maiden name of the wife of an early settler.
