= Boone Township =

Boone Township may refer to the following townships in the United States:

- Boone Township, Boone County, Illinois
- Boone Township, Cass County, Indiana
- Boone Township, Crawford County, Indiana
- Boone Township, Dubois County, Indiana
- Boone Township, Harrison County, Indiana
- Boone Township, Madison County, Indiana
- Boone Township, Porter County, Indiana
- Boone Township, Dallas County, Iowa
- Boone Township, Hancock County, Iowa
- Boone Township, Wright County, Iowa
- Boone Township, Lake of the Woods County, Minnesota
- Boone Township, Wright County, Missouri

== See also ==
- East Boone Township, Bates County, Missouri
- West Boone Township, Bates County, Missouri
- Boon Township (disambiguation)
