= Patoka Township, Crawford County, Indiana =

Patoka Township
- Township
- Location of Patoka Township in Crawford County
- Coordinates: 38°21′18″N 86°36′23″W
- Country: United States
- State: Indiana
- County: Crawford
- Named for: Patoka River or Patoka Lake, both located within the township.

Government
  - Type: Indiana township

Area
  - Total: 45.65 sq mi (118.2 km^{2})
  - Land: 43.65 sq mi (113.1 km^{2})
  - Water: 2 sq mi (5.2 km^{2})
- Elevation: 709 ft (216 m)

Population (2020)
  - Total: 1,620
  - Density: 37.1/sq mi (14.3/km^{2})
- FIPS code: 18-58284
- GNIS feature ID: 453707

Patoka Township is one of nine townships in Crawford County, Indiana, United States. As of the 2020 census, its population was 1,620 and it contained 1,585 housing units.

Historical population
Census	Pop.	Note	%±
1890	1,815		—
1900	1,831		0.9%
1910	1,536		−16.1%
1920	1,449		−5.7%
1930	1,254		−13.5%
1940	1,240		−1.1%
1950	1,236		−0.3%
1960	1,025		−17.1%
1970	992		−3.2%
1980	1,185		19.5%
1990	1,262		6.5%
2000	1,402		11.1%
2010	1,579		12.6%
2020	1,620		2.6%
Source: US Decennial Census

== Geography ==
According to the 2010 census, the township has a total area of 45.65 square miles (118.2 km^{2}), of which 43.65 square miles (113.1 km^{2}) (or 95.62%) is land and 2 square miles (5.2 km^{2}) (or 4.38%) is water.

=== Unincorporated towns ===
- Newton Stewart
- Taswell
- Wickliffe

(This list is based on USGS data and may include former settlements.)

=== Adjacent townships ===
- Jackson Township, Orange County (north)
- Greenfield Township, Orange County (northeast)
- Sterling Township (east)
- Union Township (southeast)
- Jefferson Township, Dubois County (southwest)
- Johnson Township (southwest)
- Hall Township, Dubois County (west)

=== Major highways ===
- Indiana State Road 64
- Indiana State Road 145
- Indiana State Road 164

=== Cemeteries ===
The township contains four cemeteries: Brown, Eckerty, Mount Eden and Williams.
