= Leavenworth, Indiana =

- Town
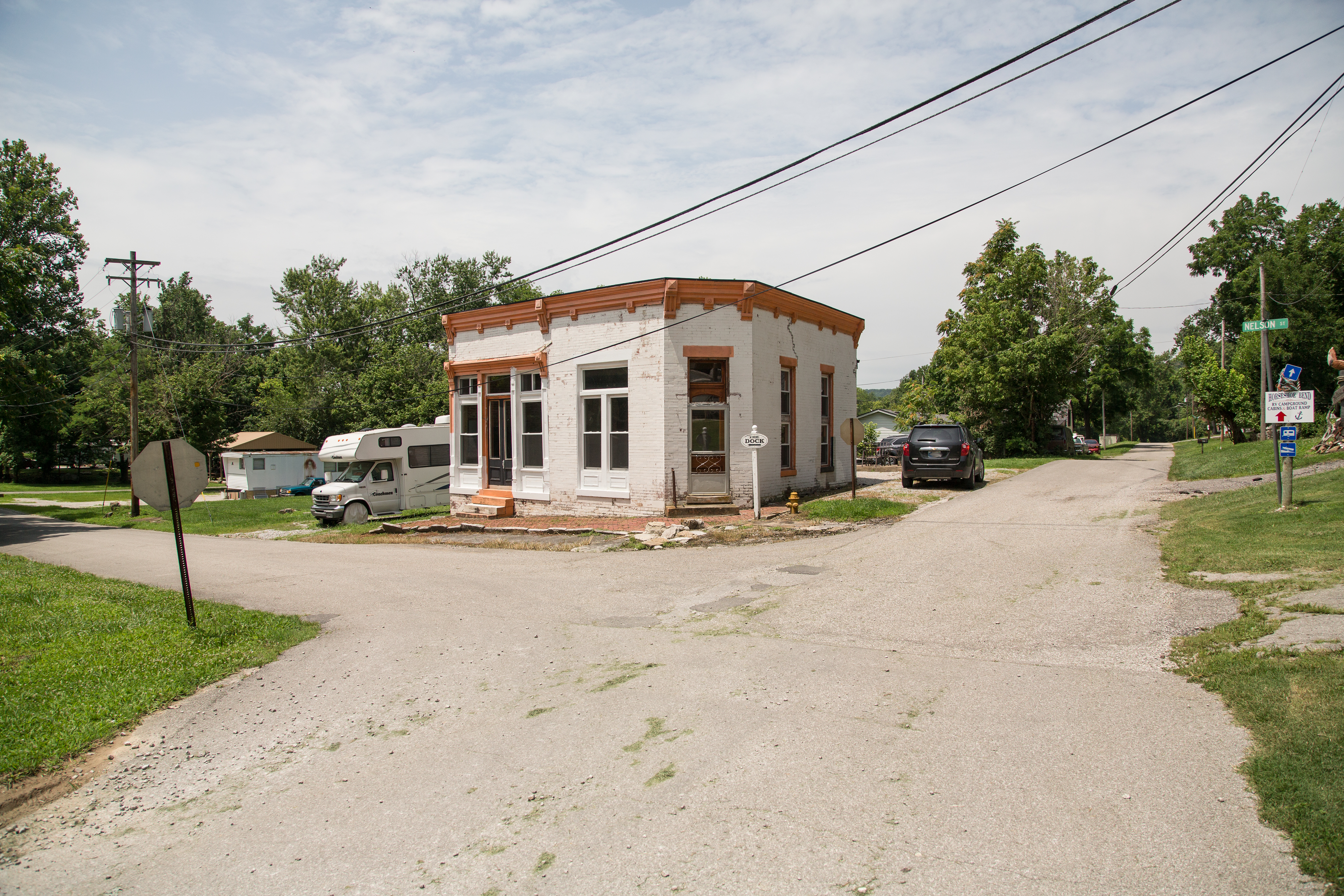

- Location of Leavenworth in Crawford County, Indiana.
- Coordinates: 38°11′59″N 86°20′44″W
- Country: United States
- State: Indiana
- County: Crawford
- Township: Jennings

Area
  - Total: 0.92 sq mi (2.39 km^{2})
  - Land: 0.88 sq mi (2.27 km^{2})
  - Water: 0.046 sq mi (0.12 km^{2})
- Elevation: 663 ft (202 m)

Population (2020)
  - Total: 289
  - Density: 329.2/sq mi (127.11/km^{2})
- Time zone: UTC-5 (Eastern (EST))
  - Summer (DST): UTC-4 (EDT)
- ZIP code: 47137
- Area code: 812
- FIPS code: 18-42606
- GNIS feature ID: 2396711
- Website: www.in.gov/towns/leavenworth/

Leavenworth is a town in Jennings Township, Crawford County, Indiana, along the Ohio River. As of the 2020 census, Leavenworth had a population of 289.

== History ==
=== Foundation and early settlement ===
Leavenworth was laid out in 1818 in a horseshoe shaped bend of the Ohio River, directly under a large bluff called Mt. Eden. The bluff forms part of the Indiana Ridge and faces directly across the river toward Kentucky. "Old Leavenworth" (the original town, now practically abandoned) was almost completely wiped out by the huge 1937 Ohio River flood, as it was built directly on the floodplain.

The town was founded by Zebulon Leavenworth and his brother Seth, natives of Connecticut.

In 1824, a wood yard was established in the town to provide fuel to steamboats, and David Lyon had a boatbuilding industry here in 1830. The Whitcomb brickyard was also a flourishing industry.

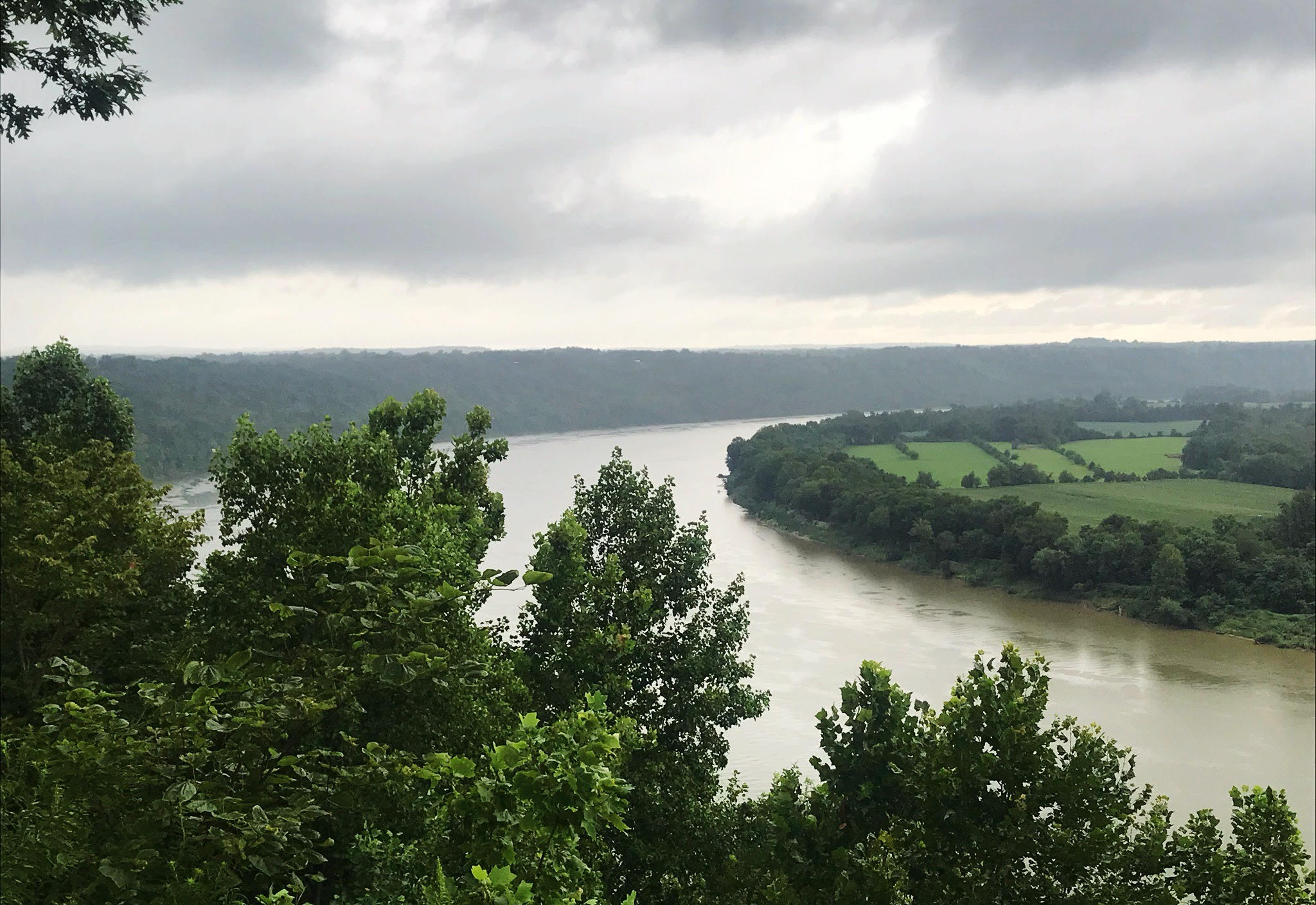
Horseshoe Bend in Ohio River, visible from Leavenworth

The Crisis, Crawford County's first newspaper, was begun in Leavenworth in 1839.

In 1835, Zebulon started a stage line from Leavenworth to the new state capitol in Indianapolis, a route intended primarily for students going to the new State College in Bloomington (later Indiana University) and for boatmen returning from downriver.

Riverboat men returning from New Orleans were thought to be carriers of the yellow fever and cholera epidemics that often devastated the Ohio Valley frontier. Seth Leavenworth advocated the construction of a marine hospital for the purpose of quarantine and medical treatment, which he hoped to build somewhere near the town of Leavenworth. The bill he put before the Indiana legislature was never enacted.

In 1843, Leavenworth supplanted Fredonia as the county seat. Leavenworth remained the county seat until 1896, when the county records were stolen by a mob in a notorious armed “courthouse war" against the town of English.

Seth Leavenworth eventually left Indiana and moved to Missouri, where he died in 1854. His son Zebulon, named after the boy's uncle in Indiana, became a famous riverboat pilot on the Mississippi River and was a friend of Mark Twain before Twain became a writer. Together, they piloted the steamboat Nebraska past Memphis at the outbreak of the Civil War, receiving gunshots across their bow as a warning to halt.

=== The Hines Raid, 1863 ===
In June 1863, a 25-year-old Confederate spy from Kentucky, Thomas Hines, was sent by General John Hunt Morgan to ride north into Indiana and reconnoiter with Southern sympathizers there, whose dedication to the Southern cause Morgan drastically overestimated. Hines and his party of nearly a hundred men stole uniforms from a Union supply depot in Brownsville, Kentucky, then robbed a train in Elizabethtown to acquire Union currency. Dressed as Federal troops, they crossed the Ohio River on horseback a few miles downstream from Leavenworth, then struck out for Paoli, pretending to be in pursuit of Union deserters.

In French Lick, they met with the local Copperhead leader, Doctor William A. Bowles, who headed the Confederate-leaning Democratic party in southern Indiana and was a supporter of slavery. Bowles told them he was unable to help them. Indiana Home Guards were then in pursuit of the Confederates. Hines hired a Leavenworth local to guide them to a safe ford over the river where they could escape into Kentucky, but the local was actually a Union supporter and betrayed them. Residents of Leavenworth carried ammunition to Union troops, who gunned several of the horsemen down as they tried to get across the river at Little Blue Island. Three Confederate soldiers were killed and a large number were taken prisoner and kept in the Methodist Church in Leavenworth. The spy, Hines, escaped.

At the end of the Civil War, Leavenworth was a thriving town, a regular stop for steamboats on the Ohio River.

=== The Fire of 1890 ===
In the Fall of 1890 a fire ravaged a portion of the town and many business were destroyed. The hotel, the newspaper, and most of the stores in the town suffered a complete loss. The fire was discovered by Lyman Davis, a porter at the Hawn Hotel, but all attempts to extinguish the blaze were to no avail.

=== Button Making and Lime Quarries ===
Button-making was an important industry, relying on shell banks in the river. The industry declined in the 1920s, when shell banks were exhausted. A total of 700 people lived in the town in 1910 and three button factories employed twenty-four families. Other industries included boat-making, freight hauling, and barrel production.

Quarries opened up in the 1880s and lime was shipped out on flatboats. In October 1890, a fire destroyed about one-third of Leavenworth. The population at this time was over five hundred.

=== The 1937 Ohio River Flood ===
The river's waters began to rise in January 1937. Record rainfalls by late January resulted in a huge flood, the most destructive in the Ohio Valley's history. Of 145 houses in Leavenworth, twenty floated away and sixty-five were lifted off their foundations. Four hundred of the town's population of 418 were forced to evacuate.

Laborers enlisted by Franklin Roosevelt's Works Progress Administration (WPA) and the Salvation Army salvaged what they could, but when the waters receded, it was decided to move what was left of Leavenworth uphill. Under the direction of Indiana Work Relief Administrator John K. Jennings, the town decided to relocate to the top of the bluff, rendering "Old" Leavenworth a ghost town. Rebuilding was complete by December 1938. Leavenworth was then the only completely rebuilt community in Indiana, though in the 1950s and 1990s, English was ravaged by floods on the Blue River and eventually relocated to higher ground in the mid-1990s, the second-largest relocation of a town in U.S. history.

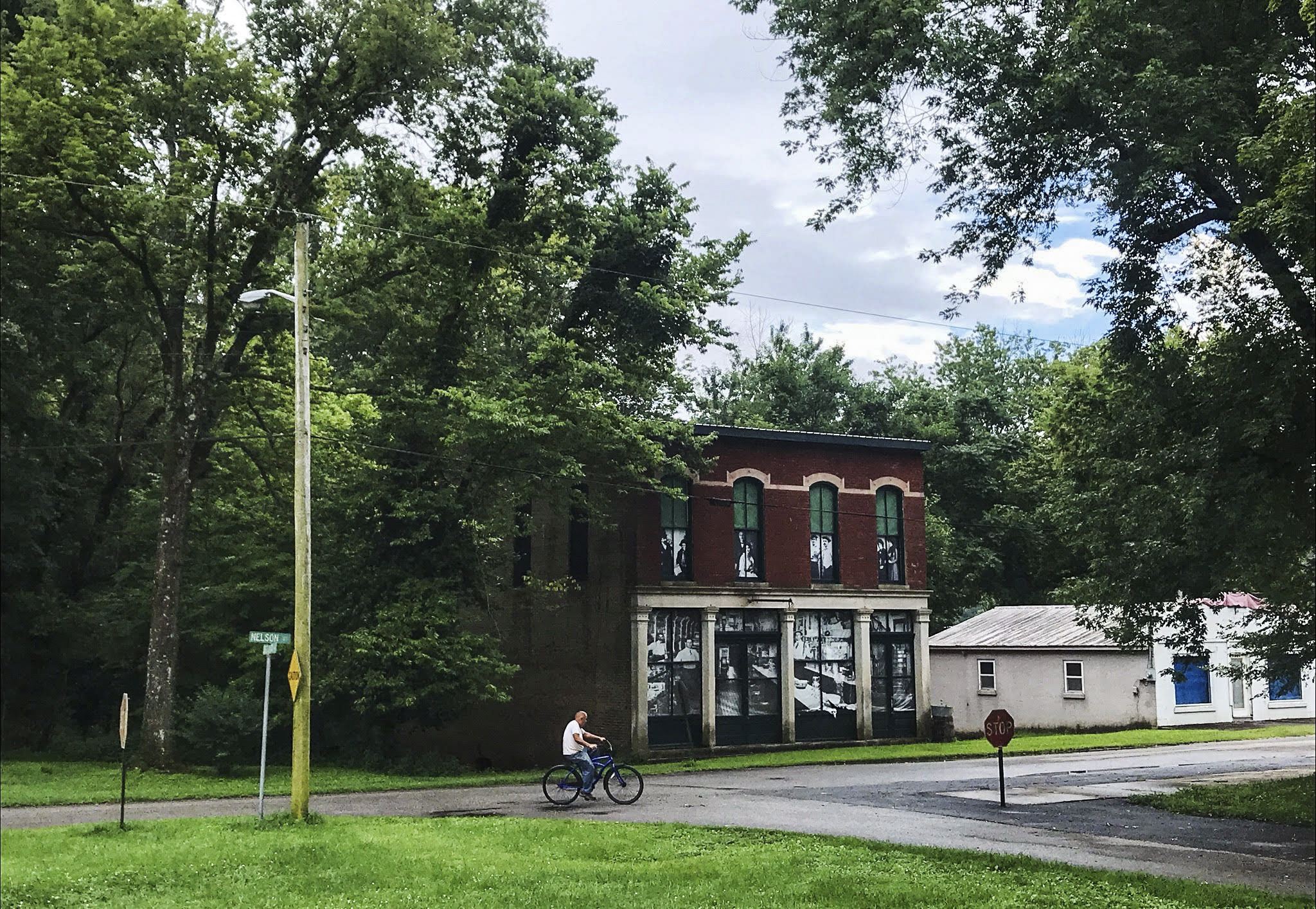
Scene from Old Leavenworth, Indiana

== Geography ==
According to the 2010 census, Leavenworth has a total area of 0.87 square miles (2.25 km^{2}), of which 0.82 square miles (2.12 km^{2}) (or 94.25%) is land and 0.05 square miles (0.13 km^{2}) (or 5.75%) is water.

=== Climate ===
The climate in this area is characterized by hot, humid summers and generally mild to cool winters. According to the Köppen Climate Classification system, Leavenworth has a humid subtropical climate, abbreviated "Cfa" on climate maps.

== Demographics ==
Historical population
| Census | Pop. | Note | %± |
|---|---|---|---|
| 1870 | 567 | | — |
| 1880 | 716 | | 26.3% |
| 1890 | 792 | | 10.6% |
| 1900 | 655 | | −17.3% |
| 1910 | 690 | | 5.3% |
| 1920 | 611 | | −11.4% |
| 1930 | 418 | | −31.6% |
| 1940 | 394 | | −5.7% |
| 1950 | 358 | | −9.1% |
| 1960 | 387 | | 8.1% |
| 1970 | 330 | | −14.7% |
| 1980 | 356 | | 7.9% |
| 1990 | 320 | | −10.1% |
| 2000 | 353 | | 10.3% |
| 2010 | 238 | | −32.6% |
| 2020 | 289 | | 21.4% |
U.S. Decennial Census

=== 2010 census ===
As of the census of 2010, there were 238 people, 88 households, and 52 families residing in the town. The population density was 290.2 inhabitants per square mile (112.0/km^{2}). There were 159 housing units at an average density of 193.9 per square mile (74.9/km^{2}). The racial makeup of the town was 95.0% White, 2.5% African American, 1.7% Pacific Islander, and 0.8% from two or more races. Hispanic or Latino of any race were 1.3% of the population.

There were 88 households, of which 21.6% had children under the age of 18 living with them, 38.6% were married couples living together, 14.8% had a female householder with no husband present, 5.7% had a male householder with no wife present, and 40.9% were non-families. 37.5% of all households were made up of individuals, and 25% had someone living alone who was 65 years of age or older. The average household size was 2.06 and the average family size was 2.63.

The median age in the town was 56.5 years. 13.9% of residents were under the age of 18; 5% were between the ages of 18 and 24; 15.1% were from 25 to 44; 30.7% were from 45 to 64; and 35.3% were 65 years of age or older. The gender makeup of the town was 40.8% male and 59.2% female.

=== 2000 census ===
As of the census of 2000, there were 353 people, 123 households, and 86 families residing in the town. The population density was 423.3 inhabitants per square mile (163.4/km^{2}). There were 187 housing units at an average density of 224.2 per square mile (86.6/km^{2}). The racial makeup of the town was 97.73% White, 1.70% African American, 0.28% from other races, and 0.28% from two or more races. Hispanic or Latino of any race were 0.57% of the population.

There were 123 households, out of which 28.5% had children under the age of 18 living with them, 48.8% were married couples living together, 19.5% had a female householder with no husband present, and 29.3% were non-families. 28.5% of all households were made up of individuals, and 15.4% had someone living alone who was 65 years of age or older. The average household size was 2.25 and the average family size was 2.70.

In the town, the population was spread out, with 17.6% under the age of 18, 6.8% from 18 to 24, 20.4% from 25 to 44, 22.9% from 45 to 64, and 32.3% who were 65 years of age or older. The median age was 48 years. For every 100 females, there were 90.8 males. For every 100 females age 18 and over, there were 84.2 males.

The median income for a household in the town was $24,375, and the median income for a family was $36,250. Males had a median income of $26,250 versus $20,000 for females. The per capita income for the town was $15,717. About 14.5% of families and 18.6% of the population were below the poverty line, including 29.7% of those under age 18 and 6.9% of those age 65 or over.

== See also ==
- List of cities and towns along the Ohio River
