= English, Indiana =

- Town
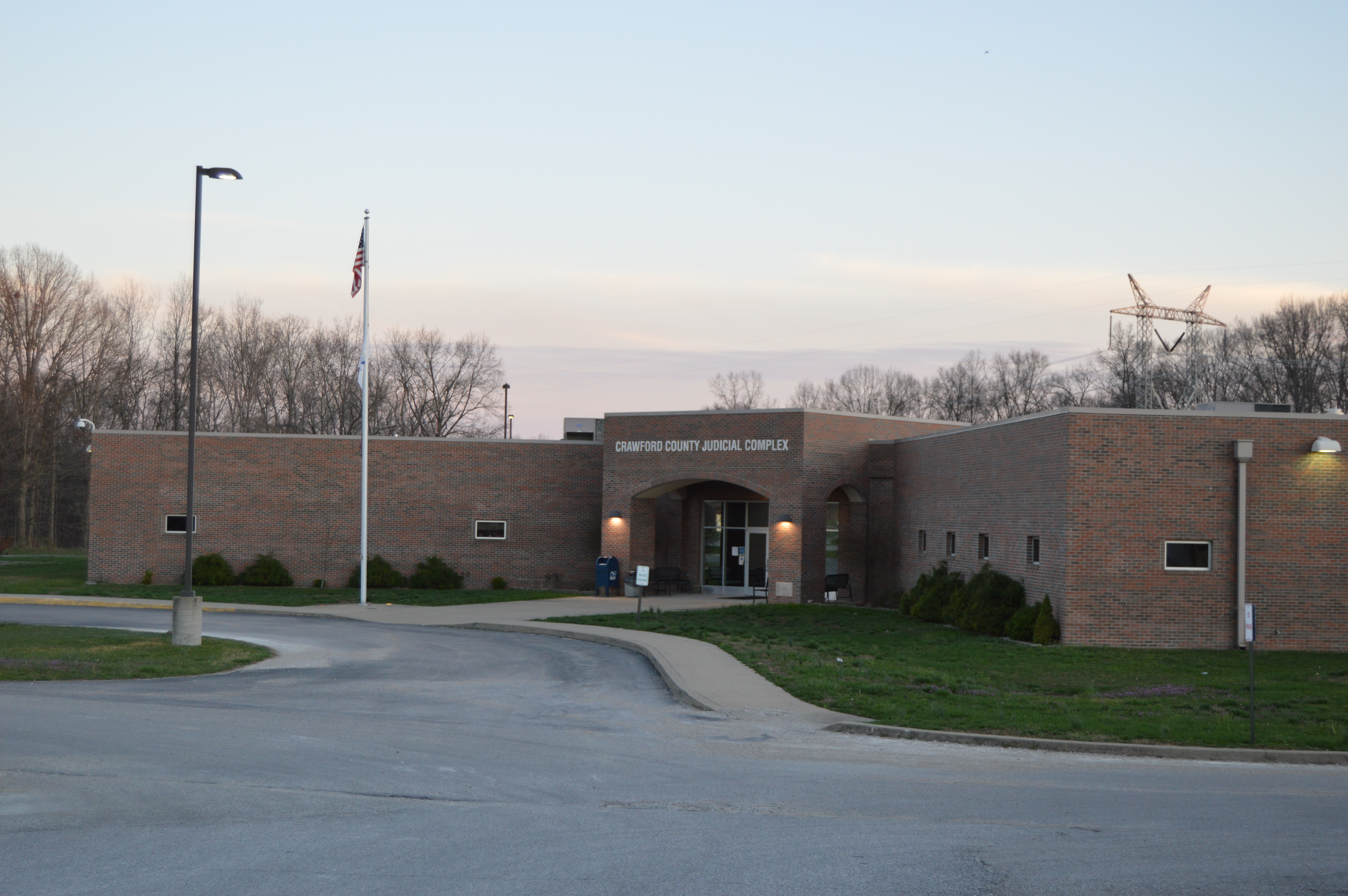
- Crawford County Courthouse

- Location of English in Crawford County, Indiana.
- Coordinates: 38°20′27″N 86°27′33″W
- Country: United States
- State: Indiana
- County: Crawford
- Township: Sterling

Area
  - Total: 3.04 sq mi (7.88 km^{2})
  - Land: 3.04 sq mi (7.88 km^{2})
  - Water: 0 sq mi (0.00 km^{2})
- Elevation: 646 ft (197 m)

Population (2020)
  - Total: 685
  - Density: 225.0/sq mi (86.89/km^{2})
- Time zone: UTC-5 (Eastern)
  - Summer (DST): UTC-4 (EDT)
- ZIP code: 47118
- Area code: 812
- FIPS code: 18-21214
- GNIS feature ID: 2396928

English is a town in and the county seat of Crawford County, Indiana, United States. The population was 685 at the 2020 census, making it one of Indiana's smallest county seats. The settlement was named Hartford (1839–1884) prior to its incorporation.

== History ==
English was called Hartford when it was laid out in 1839. When the town incorporated in 1884 it was renamed English for William Hayden English, an Indiana politician of the day. On December 28, 1893, the county seat of Crawford County was relocated from Leavenworth to English.

The first community was located at the confluence of two small rivers (Bird Dog Creek and Brownville Creek) with Blue River. It was a thriving community during the first half of the 20th century, with population rising to above 800 by 1950, but economic activity slowed thereafter (partly due to recurring flooding), and commercial establishments closed. Most residents now live on the higher ground surrounding the original settlement. A large swath of the previous inhabited level area has been converted into the Lucas Oil Golf Course.

From 1959 to 1990, English suffered six floods. The town council decided that the only solution to the flooding problem was to move the town. 160 acres (0.65 km^{2}) of high ground were purchased, a partnership was formed with Lincoln Hills Development Corporation, and a major portion of the town was relocated.

== Geography ==
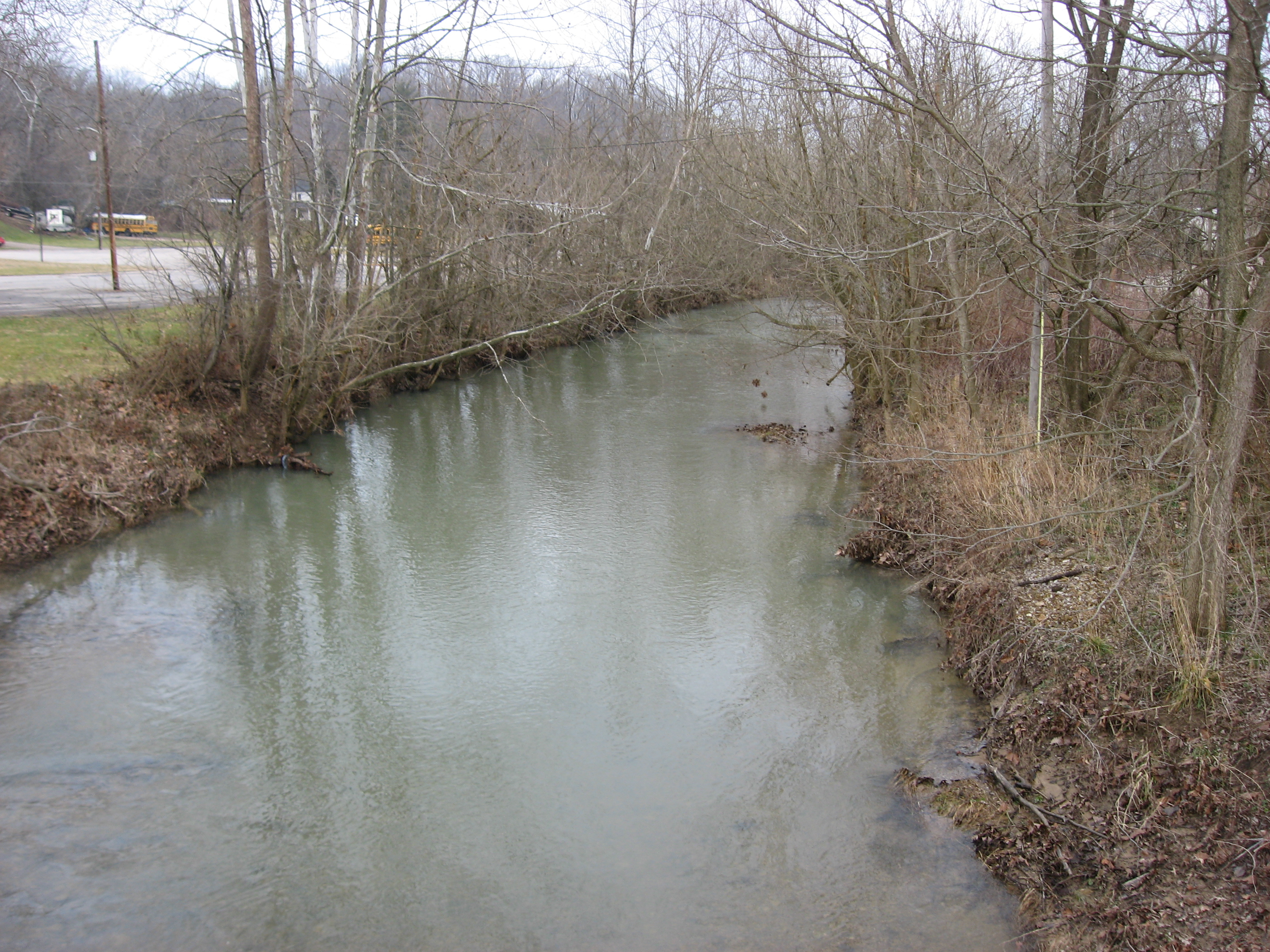
The Camp Fork, a stream that has played a destructive role in the community's history

According to the 2010 United States census, English has a total area of 3.04 square miles (7.87 km^{2}), all land.

=== Climate ===
The climate in this area is characterized by highly variable fluctuations in weather with hot, humid summers and frigidly cold, generally wet winters. According to the Köppen Climate Classification system, English previously had a humid continental climate, but as of the 2016 update it now has a humid subtropical climate due to climate change. As Southern Indiana is in a transitional zone between these two areas, localized climate does not firmly adhere to either classification.

== Music ==
Music in the area has widely been known to be Country or Bluegrass with music festivals in that area supporting that genre of music. In 2024, an alternative band by the name 'Faith In Humanity' recorded their 2nd album 'The Dark Wave' making them the first band to have recorded a full studio album in that area despite living in a poverty stricken part of town due to multiple floods damaging that area over the years. With Country music being predominantly popular within the area, Punk and Synthwave are currently also playing a major factor in music in the area.

== Demographics ==
Historical population
Census	Pop.	Note	%±
1890	423		—
1900	649		53.4%
1910	583		−10.2%
1920	576		−1.2%
1930	704		22.2%
1940	757		7.5%
1950	839		10.8%
1960	698		−16.8%
1970	664		−4.9%
1980	633		−4.7%
1990	614		−3.0%
2000	673		9.6%
2010	645		−4.2%
2020	685		6.2%
U.S. Decennial Census

=== 2010 census ===
As of the 2010 United States census, there were 645 people, 285 households, and 177 families in the town. The population density was 212.2 inhabitants per square mile (81.9/km^{2}). There were 335 housing units at an average density of 110.2 per square mile (42.5/km^{2}). The racial makeup of the town was 97.5% White, 0.3% African American, 0.6% Native American, 0.2% Asian, 0.3% from other races, and 1.1% from two or more races. Hispanic or Latino of any race were 0.8% of the population.

There were 285 households, of which 27.7% had children under the age of 18 living with them, 44.9% were married couples living together, 12.6% had a female householder with no husband present, 4.6% had a male householder with no wife present, and 37.9% were non-families. 32.3% of all households were made up of individuals, and 14.8% had someone living alone who was 65 years of age or older. The average household size was 2.26 and the average family size was 2.79.

The median age in the town was 43.6 years. 20.9% of residents were under the age of 18; 10.5% were between the ages of 18 and 24; 20.3% were from 25 to 44; 28.4% were from 45 to 64; and 20% were 65 years of age or older. The gender makeup of the town was 47.3% male and 52.7% female.

=== 2000 census ===
As of the 2000 United States census, there were 673 people, 294 households, and 171 families in the town. The population density was 220.5 inhabitants per square mile (85.1/km^{2}). There were 341 housing units at an average density of 111.7 per square mile (43.1/km^{2}). The racial makeup of the town was 98.66% White, 1.19% Native American, 0.15% from other races. Hispanic or Latino of any race were 0.59% of the population.

There were 294 households, out of which 28.2% had children under the age of 18 living with them, 42.9% were married couples living together, 13.6% had a female householder with no husband present, and 41.8% were non-families. 38.8% of all households were made up of individuals, and 20.4% had someone living alone who was 65 years of age or older. The average household size was 2.24 and the average family size was 2.99.

The town population contained 24.4% under the age of 18, 9.5% from 18 to 24, 26.6% from 25 to 44, 22.4% from 45 to 64, and 17.1% who were 65 years of age or older. The median age was 38 years. For every 100 females, there were 83.4 males. For every 100 females age 18 and over, there were 81.1 males.

The median income for a household in the town was $20,870, and the median income for a family was $27,708. Males had a median income of $25,000 versus $18,971 for females. The per capita income for the town was $11,065. About 24.0% of families and 33.9% of the population were below the poverty line, including 54.9% of those under age 18 and 25.2% of those age 65 or over.

== Education ==
The Crawford County Public Library, one of two lending libraries in the county (the other is Breeden Memorial Library in Leavenworth), is located at English.

== Notable people ==
- John Franklin Bobbitt, American educator
- Lee Roberson, preacher and founder of Tennessee Temple University
- Jerry Sturm, American football player
- Frederick Terman, American academician and "father of Silicon Valley"
