= Beechwood, Indiana =

Unincorporated community in Indiana, U.S.

Coordinates: 38°12′24″N 86°25′28″W

Beechwood is an unincorporated community in Crawford County, Indiana, in the United States.

== History ==
Beechwood contained a post office between 1875 and 1963. The community was named from the presence of beech trees at the town site.
