= William Proctor House (Marengo, Indiana) =

Historic house in Indiana, United States

- U.S. National Register of Historic Places
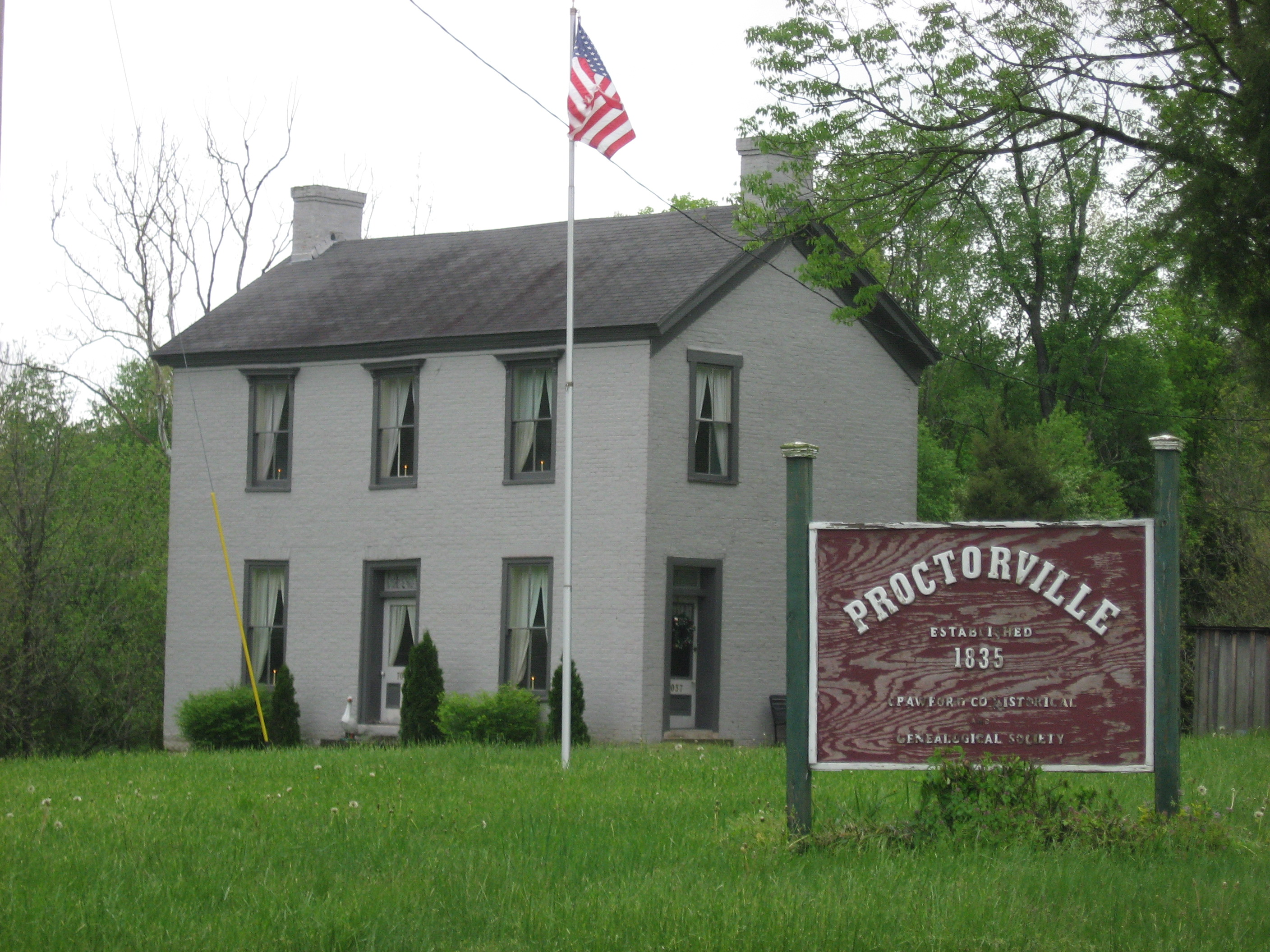
- William Proctor House, May 2013

- Location within Indiana Location within the United States
- Location: 7037 State Road 64, east of Marengo, Indiana
- Coordinates: 38°22′00″N 86°19′40″W
- Area: 7.091 acres (2.870 ha)
- Built: c. 1832
- Architectural style: Federal
- NRHP reference No.: 13000419
- Added to NRHP: June 25, 2013

William Proctor House is a historic home located in Liberty Township, Crawford County, Indiana. It was built about 1832, and is a two-story, three-bay, Federal style brick dwelling. It has a gable roof with end chimneys. The house has later rear additions. The property is owned by the Crawford County Historical Society.

It was listed on the National Register of Historic Places in 2013.
