= Boone Township, Wright County, Missouri =

Inactive township in the US state of Missouri

Coordinates: 37.3054381°N 92.6090433°W

Boone Township is an inactive township in Wright County, in the U.S. state of Missouri.

Boone Township was named directly or indirectly after frontiersman Daniel Boone. Possibly also named after his son, Nathan Boone, who settled in the area in 1863.
