= Mifflin, Indiana =

Unincorporated community in Indiana, U.S.

Coordinates: 38°18′22″N 86°32′25″W

Mifflin is an unincorporated community in Crawford County, Indiana, in the United States.

== History ==
A post office was established at Mifflin in 1848, and remained in operation until it was discontinued in 1967.
