= Boone Township, Crawford County, Indiana =

Boone Township
- Township
- Location of Boone Township in Crawford County
- Coordinates: 38°09′22″N 86°26′27″W
- Country: United States
- State: Indiana
- County: Crawford

Government
  - Type: Indiana township

Area
  - Total: 12.19 sq mi (31.6 km^{2})
  - Land: 12 sq mi (31 km^{2})
  - Water: 0.19 sq mi (0.49 km^{2})
- Elevation: 479 ft (146 m)

Population (2020)
  - Total: 145
  - Density: 12/sq mi (4.7/km^{2})
- FIPS code: 18-06508
- GNIS feature ID: 453126

Boone Township is one of nine townships in Crawford County, Indiana. As of the 2020 census, its population was 145 and it contained 107 housing units.

Historical population
Census	Pop.	Note	%±
1890	746		—
1900	657		−11.9%
1910	489		−25.6%
1920	444		−9.2%
1930	374		−15.8%
1940	383		2.4%
1950	285		−25.6%
1960	208		−27.0%
1970	151		−27.4%
1980	200		32.5%
1990	153		−23.5%
2000	174		13.7%
2010	175		0.6%
2020	145		−17.1%
Source: US Decennial Census

== Geography ==
According to the 2010 census, the township has a total area of 12.19 square miles (31.6 km^{2}), of which 12 square miles (31 km^{2}) (or 98.44%) is land and 0.19 square miles (0.49 km^{2}) (or 1.56%) is water.

=== Cities and towns ===
- Alton

=== Unincorporated towns ===
(This list is based on USGS data and may include former settlements.)

=== Adjacent townships ===
- Ohio Township (northeast)
- Union Township, Perry County (southwest)
- Oil Township, Perry County (west)

=== Cemeteries ===
The township contains five cemeteries: Birds, Orchard Hill, Riddle, Sheckell and Burnside.
