= Fredonia, Indiana =

Coordinates: 38°10′41″N 86°22′59″W

Fredonia is an unincorporated community in Crawford County, Indiana, United States.

== History ==
Fredonia was platted in 1818.

Fredonia held the county seat from 1822 until 1843. Although it was prominent in its early years — Crawford County's first brick building was constructed in Fredonia — an 1889 county history observed that the community was never prosperous, and "The old houses are fast tumbling down and going to decay". This lack of prosperity was due largely to its location: although it lies along the Ohio River, Fredonia has no landing, unlike other Crawford County settlements such as Leavenworth.

A post office was established at Fredonia in 1819, and remained in operation until it was discontinued in 1965.
