= Liberty Township, Crawford County, Indiana =

Liberty Township
- Township
- Location of Liberty Township in Crawford County
- Coordinates: 38°21′48″N 86°21′47″W
- Country: United States
- State: Indiana
- County: Crawford

Government
  - Type: Indiana township

Area
  - Total: 21.51 sq mi (55.7 km^{2})
  - Land: 21.51 sq mi (55.7 km^{2})
  - Water: 0 sq mi (0 km^{2})
- Elevation: 620 ft (189 m)

Population (2020)
  - Total: 1,968
  - Density: 91.49/sq mi (35.33/km^{2})
- FIPS code: 18-43218
- GNIS feature ID: 453551

Liberty Township is one of nine townships in Crawford County, Indiana. As of the 2020 census, its population was 1,968 and it contained 891 housing units.

Historical population
Census	Pop.	Note	%±
1890	1,379		—
1900	1,351		−2.0%
1910	1,307		−3.3%
1920	1,349		3.2%
1930	1,341		−0.6%
1940	1,394		4.0%
1950	1,370		−1.7%
1960	1,381		0.8%
1970	1,379		−0.1%
1980	1,760		27.6%
1990	1,835		4.3%
2000	2,045		11.4%
2010	1,990		−2.7%
2020	1,968		−1.1%
Source: US Decennial Census

== History ==
The William Proctor House was listed on the National Register of Historic Places in 2013.

== Geography ==
According to the 2010 census, the township has a total area of 21.51 square miles (55.7 km^{2}), all land.

=== Cities and towns ===
- Marengo

=== Adjacent townships ===
- Southeast Township, Orange County (north)
- Whiskey Run Township (southeast)
- Sterling Township (west)

=== Major highways ===
- Indiana State Road 64
- Indiana State Road 66

=== Cemeteries ===
The township contains four cemeteries: Marengo, Marengo New Section, Marengo Old Section and White.
