= Crawford County, Indiana =

County in Indiana, United States

- County
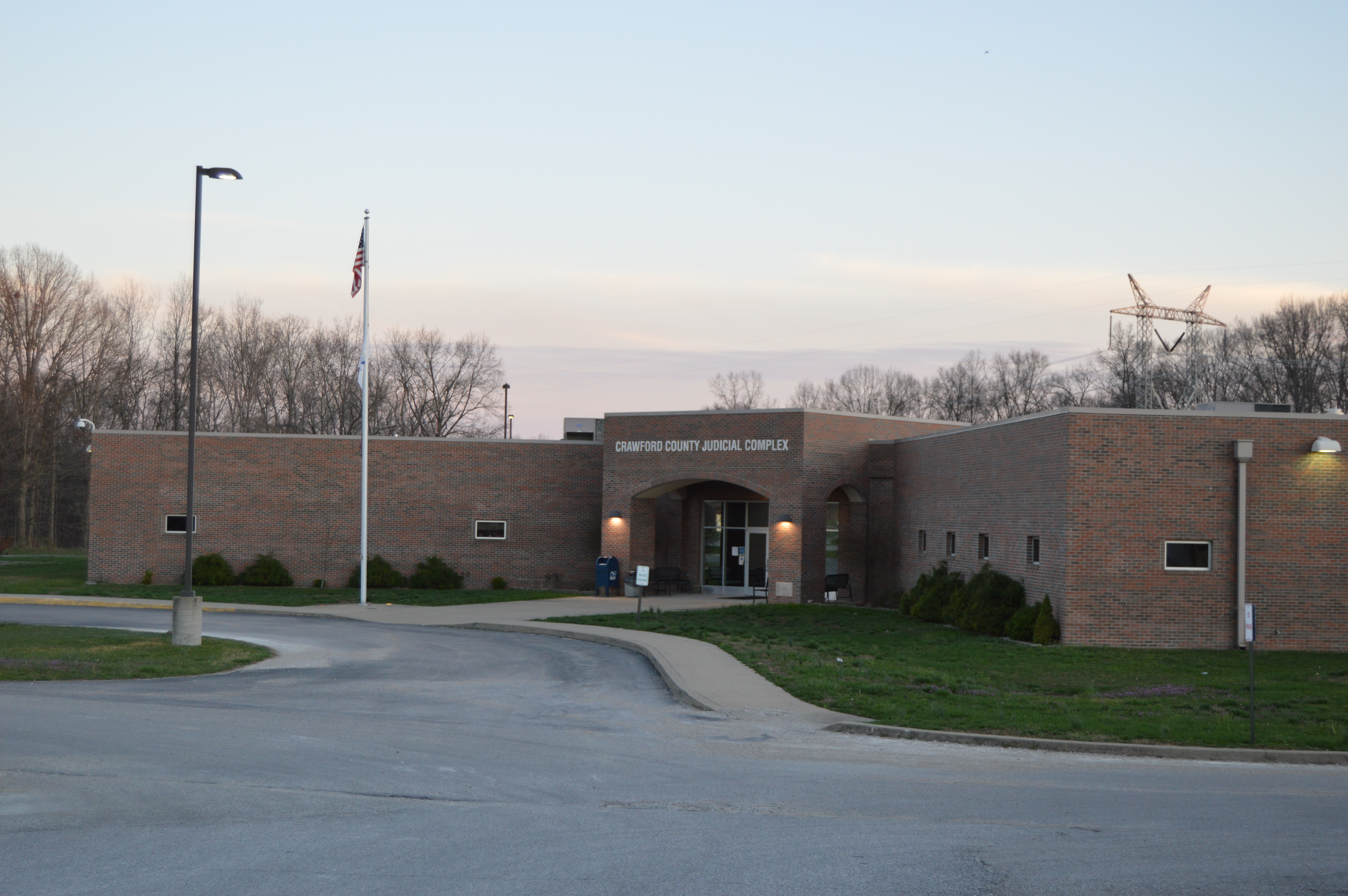
- Crawford County Courthouse in English

- Location within the U.S. state of Indiana
- Coordinates: 38°17′N 86°28′W
- Country: United States
- State: Indiana
- Founded: January 5, 1818
- Named for: William H. Crawford
- Seat: English
- Largest town: Marengo

Area
  - Total: 308.72 sq mi (799.6 km^{2})
  - Land: 305.64 sq mi (791.6 km^{2})
  - Water: 3.08 sq mi (8.0 km^{2}) 1.00%

Population (2020)
  - Total: 10,526
  - Estimate (2025): 10,509 ▼
  - Density: 34.439/sq mi (13.297/km^{2})
- Time zone: UTC−5 (Eastern)
  - Summer (DST): UTC−4 (EDT)
- Congressional districts: 8th, 9th
- Website: www.in.gov/counties/crawford/home/
- Indiana county number 13

Crawford County is a county located in the U.S. state of Indiana. As of 2020, the population was 10,526. The county seat is English.

== Geography ==
According to the 2010 census, the county has a total area of 308.72 square miles (799.6 km^{2}), of which 305.64 square miles (791.6 km^{2}) (or 99.00%) is land and 3.08 square miles (8.0 km^{2}) (or 1.00%) is water. Much like the rest of South Central Indiana, the terrain of Crawford County is primarily made up of wooded hills, many of them steep.

=== Cities and towns ===
- Alton
- English
- Leavenworth
- Marengo
- Milltown (partial)

==== Unincorporated areas ====
- Beechwood
- Curby
- Eckerty
- Fredonia
- Grantsburg
- Mifflin
- Riddle
- Sulphur
- Taswell
- West Fork
- Wickliffe

=== Townships ===
- Boone
- Jennings
- Johnson
- Liberty
- Ohio
- Patoka
- Sterling
- Union
- Whiskey Run

=== Transit ===
- Southern Indiana Transit System

=== Major highways ===
- Interstate 64
- Indiana State Road 37
- Indiana State Road 62
- Indiana State Road 64
- Indiana State Road 66
- Indiana State Road 145
- Indiana State Road 164
- Indiana State Road 237

=== Adjacent counties ===
- Orange County (north)
- Washington County (northeast)
- Harrison County (east)
- Meade County, Kentucky (south)
- Perry County (southwest/CT Boundary)
- Dubois County (west)

=== National protected area ===
- Hoosier National Forest (part)

== History ==
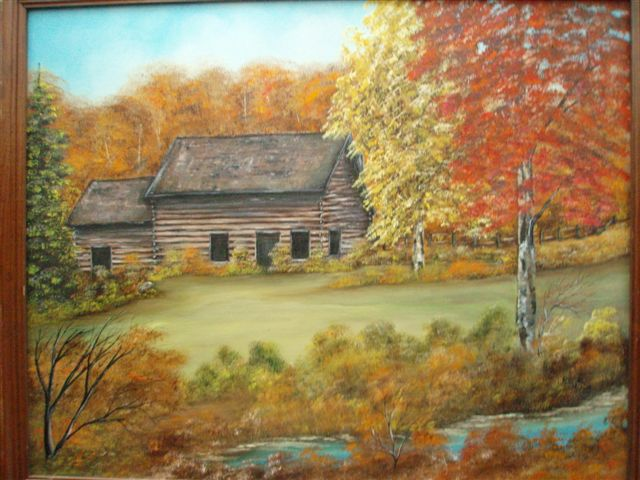
Oil painting of Thomas Ogle Stroud's cabin before it was moved in 2007.

The first white settler, Thomas Ogle Stroud, arrived in the area in March 1806, settling on the Cider Fork of Whiskey Run creek.

Crawford County was formed on January 5, 1818, from land in the Harrison, Orange, and Perry counties, prompted by a petition of what would become of Crawford County's population. Some say it was named for William H. Crawford, who was U.S. Treasury Secretary in 1818. Others say it was named for Col. William Crawford, who fought in the French and Indian War and Revolutionary War, and who was burned and scalped by Indians in 1782 in what is now Wyandot County, Ohio. The county seat was in Leavenworth for several decades but eventually moved to English.

Bands of "White Caps" terrorized the county in the late 1880s, according to a report by Attorney General Louis T. Michener. Blacks and others they disliked were forced out; victims, both male and female, were severely whipped.

== Climate and weather ==
English, Indiana

Climate chart (precipitation, max. and min. temperature)
| J | F | M | A | M | J | J | A | S | O | N | D |
| 3.7 41 21 | 3.5 48 24 | 4.8 59 33 | 4.7 69 41 | 5.1 77 49 | 4.8 85 59 | 4.2 88 63 | 3.9 87 61 | 3.6 81 53 | 3.1 70 41 | 4.4 57 34 | 4 46 25 |
- █ Average max. and min. temperatures in °F
- █ Precipitation totals in inches
- Source: The Weather Channel
Metric conversion
| J | F | M | A | M | J | J | A | S | O | N | D |
| 93 5 −6 | 89 9 −4 | 122 15 1 | 120 21 5 | 129 25 9 | 122 29 15 | 108 31 17 | 99 31 16 | 90 27 12 | 80 21 5 | 110 14 1 | 101 8 −4 |
- █ Average max. and min. temperatures in °C
- █ Precipitation totals in mm

In recent years, average temperatures in English have ranged from a low of 21 °F (−6 °C) in January to a high of 88 °F (31 °C) in July. Although, a record low of −31 °F (−35 °C) was recorded in January 1977 and a record high of 104 °F (40 °C) was recorded in July 1983. Average monthly precipitation ranged from 3.13 inches (80 mm) in October to 5.06 inches (129 mm) in May.

== Government ==
The county government is a constitutional body, and is granted specific powers by the Constitution of Indiana, and by the Indiana Code.

County Council: The county council is the fiscal branch of the county government and controls all the spending and revenue collection in the county. Representatives are elected from county districts. The council members serve four-year terms. They are responsible for setting salaries, the annual budget, and special spending. The council also has limited authority to impose local taxes, in the form of an income and property tax that is subject to state level approval, excise taxes, and service taxes.

Board of Commissioners: The executive body of the county is made of a board of commissioners. The commissioners are elected county-wide, in staggered terms, and each serves a four-year term. One of the commissioners, typically the most senior, serves as president. The commissioners are charged with executing the acts legislated by the council, collecting revenue, and managing the day-to-day functions of the county government.

Court: The county maintains a small claims court that can handle some civil cases. The judge on the court is elected to a term of four years and must be a member of the Indiana Bar Association. The judge is assisted by a constable who is also elected to a four-year term. In some cases, court decisions can be appealed to the state level circuit court.

County Officials: The county has several other elected offices, including sheriff, coroner, auditor, treasurer, recorder, surveyor, and circuit court clerk. Each of these elected officers serves a term of four years and oversees a different part of county government. Members elected to county government positions are required to declare a party affiliation and to be residents of the county.

Crawford County is part of Indiana's 8th congressional district and is represented in Congress by Republican Larry Bucshon. It is also part of Indiana Senate district 47 and Indiana House of Representatives district 73.

United States presidential election results for Crawford County, Indiana
| Year | Republican | | Democratic | | Third party(ies) | |
| Year | No. | % | No. | % | No. | % |
|---|---|---|---|---|---|---|
| 1888 | 1,445 | 46.54% | 1,628 | 52.43% | 32 | 1.03% |
| 1892 | 1,276 | 42.21% | 1,529 | 50.58% | 218 | 7.21% |
| 1896 | 1,490 | 47.27% | 1,655 | 52.51% | 7 | 0.22% |
| 1900 | 1,529 | 46.11% | 1,731 | 52.20% | 56 | 1.69% |
| 1904 | 1,470 | 45.99% | 1,509 | 47.22% | 217 | 6.79% |
| 1908 | 1,403 | 44.50% | 1,539 | 48.81% | 211 | 6.69% |
| 1912 | 663 | 24.79% | 1,159 | 43.33% | 853 | 31.89% |
| 1916 | 1,201 | 41.05% | 1,508 | 51.54% | 217 | 7.42% |
| 1920 | 2,290 | 49.05% | 2,213 | 47.40% | 166 | 3.56% |
| 1924 | 1,917 | 43.08% | 2,384 | 53.57% | 149 | 3.35% |
| 1928 | 2,672 | 57.39% | 1,933 | 41.52% | 51 | 1.10% |
| 1932 | 2,175 | 39.35% | 3,272 | 59.19% | 81 | 1.47% |
| 1936 | 2,589 | 46.91% | 2,919 | 52.89% | 11 | 0.20% |
| 1940 | 2,652 | 47.97% | 2,836 | 51.29% | 41 | 0.74% |
| 1944 | 2,488 | 50.50% | 2,335 | 47.39% | 104 | 2.11% |
| 1948 | 2,427 | 46.97% | 2,625 | 50.80% | 115 | 2.23% |
| 1952 | 2,750 | 51.85% | 2,457 | 46.32% | 97 | 1.83% |
| 1956 | 2,694 | 51.96% | 2,433 | 46.92% | 58 | 1.12% |
| 1960 | 2,915 | 55.47% | 2,305 | 43.86% | 35 | 0.67% |
| 1964 | 1,828 | 41.74% | 2,514 | 57.40% | 38 | 0.87% |
| 1968 | 2,132 | 49.81% | 1,536 | 35.89% | 612 | 14.30% |
| 1972 | 2,623 | 58.96% | 1,801 | 40.48% | 25 | 0.56% |
| 1976 | 2,181 | 44.08% | 2,721 | 54.99% | 46 | 0.93% |
| 1980 | 2,554 | 52.51% | 2,130 | 43.79% | 180 | 3.70% |
| 1984 | 2,633 | 53.63% | 2,256 | 45.95% | 21 | 0.43% |
| 1988 | 2,532 | 55.09% | 2,036 | 44.30% | 28 | 0.61% |
| 1992 | 1,903 | 38.11% | 2,260 | 45.25% | 831 | 16.64% |
| 1996 | 1,759 | 36.57% | 2,324 | 48.32% | 727 | 15.11% |
| 2000 | 2,327 | 55.29% | 1,817 | 43.17% | 65 | 1.54% |
| 2004 | 2,609 | 57.04% | 1,932 | 42.24% | 33 | 0.72% |
| 2008 | 2,393 | 50.44% | 2,286 | 48.19% | 65 | 1.37% |
| 2012 | 2,421 | 52.75% | 2,041 | 44.47% | 128 | 2.79% |
| 2016 | 3,015 | 64.95% | 1,323 | 28.50% | 304 | 6.55% |
| 2020 | 3,483 | 70.39% | 1,355 | 27.38% | 110 | 2.22% |
| 2024 | 3,668 | 73.20% | 1,235 | 24.65% | 108 | 2.16% |

== Demographics ==
Historical population
| Census | Pop. | Note | %± |
|---|---|---|---|
| 1820 | 2,583 | | — |
| 1830 | 3,238 | | 25.4% |
| 1840 | 5,282 | | 63.1% |
| 1850 | 6,524 | | 23.5% |
| 1860 | 8,226 | | 26.1% |
| 1870 | 9,851 | | 19.8% |
| 1880 | 12,356 | | 25.4% |
| 1890 | 13,941 | | 12.8% |
| 1900 | 13,476 | | −3.3% |
| 1910 | 12,057 | | −10.5% |
| 1920 | 11,201 | | −7.1% |
| 1930 | 10,160 | | −9.3% |
| 1940 | 10,171 | | 0.1% |
| 1950 | 9,289 | | −8.7% |
| 1960 | 8,379 | | −9.8% |
| 1970 | 8,033 | | −4.1% |
| 1980 | 9,820 | | 22.2% |
| 1990 | 9,914 | | 1.0% |
| 2000 | 10,743 | | 8.4% |
| 2010 | 10,713 | | −0.3% |
| 2020 | 10,526 | | −1.7% |
| 2025 (est.) | 10,509 | ▼ | −0.2% |
U.S. Decennial Census; 1790-1960 1900-1990; 1990-2000 2010-2013

=== Racial and ethnic composition ===
Crawford County, Indiana – Racial and ethnic composition Note: the US Census treats Hispanic/Latino as an ethnic category. This table excludes Latinos from the racial categories and assigns them to a separate category. Hispanics/Latinos may be of any race.
| Race / Ethnicity (NH = Non-Hispanic) | Pop 1980 | Pop 1990 | Pop 2000 | Pop 2010 | Pop 2020 | % 1980 | % 1990 | % 2000 | % 2010 | % 2020 |
|---|---|---|---|---|---|---|---|---|---|---|
| White alone (NH) | 9,721 | 9,852 | 10,519 | 10,390 | 9,989 | 98.99% | 99.37% | 97.91% | 96.98% | 94.90% |
| Black or African American alone (NH) | 13 | 9 | 16 | 21 | 26 | 0.13% | 0.09% | 0.15% | 0.20% | 0.25% |
| Native American or Alaska Native alone (NH) | 33 | 26 | 35 | 40 | 23 | 0.34% | 0.26% | 0.33% | 0.37% | 0.22% |
| Asian alone (NH) | 7 | 11 | 13 | 20 | 17 | 0.07% | 0.11% | 0.12% | 0.19% | 0.16% |
| Native Hawaiian or Pacific Islander alone (NH) | x | x | 7 | 9 | 1 | x | x | 0.07% | 0.08% | 0.01% |
| Other race alone (NH) | 0 | 0 | 6 | 4 | 8 | 0.00% | 0.00% | 0.06% | 0.04% | 0.08% |
| Mixed race or Multiracial (NH) | x | x | 47 | 103 | 341 | x | x | 0.44% | 0.96% | 3.24% |
| Hispanic or Latino (any race) | 46 | 16 | 100 | 126 | 121 | 0.47% | 0.16% | 0.93% | 1.18% | 1.15% |
| Total | 9,820 | 9,914 | 10,743 | 10,713 | 10,526 | 100.00% | 100.00% | 100.00% | 100.00% | 100.00% |

=== 2020 census ===
As of the 2020 census, the county had a population of 10,526. The median age was 45.0 years. 21.9% of residents were under the age of 18 and 20.5% of residents were 65 years of age or older. For every 100 females there were 105.1 males, and for every 100 females age 18 and over there were 105.4 males age 18 and over.

The racial makeup of the county was 95.3% White, 0.3% Black or African American, 0.3% American Indian and Alaska Native, 0.2% Asian, <0.1% Native Hawaiian and Pacific Islander, 0.4% from some other race, and 3.5% from two or more races. Hispanic or Latino residents of any race comprised 1.1% of the population.

<0.1% of residents lived in urban areas, while 100.0% lived in rural areas.

There were 4,330 households in the county, of which 27.3% had children under the age of 18 living in them. Of all households, 51.0% were married-couple households, 21.4% were households with a male householder and no spouse or partner present, and 20.0% were households with a female householder and no spouse or partner present. About 28.5% of all households were made up of individuals and 13.7% had someone living alone who was 65 years of age or older.

There were 5,871 housing units, of which 26.2% were vacant. Among occupied housing units, 82.1% were owner-occupied and 17.9% were renter-occupied. The homeowner vacancy rate was 1.7% and the rental vacancy rate was 7.2%.

=== 2010 census ===
As of the 2010 United States census, there were 10,713 people, 4,303 households, and 2,991 families residing in the county. The population density was 35.1 inhabitants per square mile (13.6/km^{2}). There were 5,520 housing units at an average density of 18.1 per square mile (7.0/km^{2}). The racial makeup of the county was 97.4% white, 0.4% American Indian, 0.2% black or African American, 0.2% Asian, 0.1% Pacific islander, 0.6% from other races, and 1.1% from two or more races. Those of Hispanic or Latino origin made up 1.2% of the population. In terms of ancestry, 23.8% were German, 17.4% were Irish, 13.4% were American, and 8.7% were English.

Of the 4,303 households, 30.6% had children under the age of 18 living with them, 54.6% were married couples living together, 9.7% had a female householder with no husband present, 30.5% were non-families, and 25.6% of all households were made up of individuals. The average household size was 2.48 and the average family size was 2.95. The median age was 41.8 years.

The median income for a household in the county was $47,697 and the median income for a family was $46,073. Males had a median income of $36,465 versus $26,005 for females. The per capita income for the county was $18,598. About 17.4% of families and 18.7% of the population were below the poverty line, including 25.0% of those under age 18 and 15.0% of those age 65 or over.

== See also ==
- National Register of Historic Places listings in Crawford County, Indiana

== Sources ==
- Forstall, Richard L. (editor) (1996). Population of states and counties of the United States: 1790 to 1990 : from the twenty-one decennial censuses. United States Department of Commerce, Bureau of the Census, Population Division. ISBN 0-934213-48-8.
