= National Register of Historic Places listings in Harrison County, Indiana =

Location of Harrison County in Indiana

This is a list of the National Register of Historic Places listings in Harrison County, Indiana.

This is intended to be a complete list of the properties and districts on the National Register of Historic Places in Harrison County, Indiana, United States. Latitude and longitude coordinates are provided for many National Register properties and districts; these locations may be seen together in a Google map.

There are six properties and districts listed on the National Register in the county.

Properties and districts located in incorporated areas are listed with the name of the municipality, while those in unincorporated areas are listed with the name of their civil township. Properties and districts split between multiple jurisdictions display the names of all jurisdictions.

This National Park Service list is complete through NPS recent listings posted August 29, 2025.

== Current listings ==
	Name on the Register	Image	Date listed	Location	City or town	Description
1	Corydon Battle Site	Corydon Battle Site	July 9, 1979 (#79000017)	South of Corydon on State Road 135; 38°12′01″N 86°07′45″W	Harrison Township	Site of Battle of Corydon
2	Corydon Historic District	Corydon Historic District	August 28, 1973 (#73000017)	Corydon: roughly bounded by Summit, Maple, and Walnut Sts., College Ave., Chestnut, and Capitol, Poplar, Water, Beaver, and Mulberry Sts. 38°12′42″N 86°07′26″W	Corydon	Specific boundaries represent a boundary increase of June 27, 1989
3	Kintner House Hotel	Kintner House Hotel	January 12, 1987 (#87000099)	201 S. Capital; 38°12′37″N 86°07′36″W	Corydon	
4	Kintner-McGrain House	Kintner-McGrain House	August 3, 1983 (#83000032)	740 N. Capital Ave. 38°13′05″N 86°07′33″W	Corydon	
5	Kintner–Withers House	Kintner–Withers House	November 28, 1980 (#80000039)	South of Laconia on Kintner Bottoms Rd. 37°58′27″N 86°03′34″W	Boone Township	
6	Swan's Landing Archeological Site (12HR304)	Swan's Landing Archeological Site (12HR304)	April 2, 1987 (#87000517)	Mile 658 on the Ohio River, north of New Amsterdam at the end of Lickford Bridge Rd. 38°07′55″N 86°16′08″W	Washington Township	

== See also ==
- List of National Historic Landmarks in Indiana
- National Register of Historic Places listings in Indiana
- Listings in neighboring counties: Crawford, Floyd, Hardin (KY), Jefferson (KY), Meade (KY), Washington
- List of Indiana state historical markers in Harrison County
- List of attractions and events in the Louisville metropolitan area
