= Kintner =

Kintner is a surname. Notable people with the surname include:

- Bill Kintner (born 1960), American politician from Nebraska
- Earl W. Kintner (1912–1991), Chairman of the Federal Trade Commission
- Jill Kintner (born 1981), professional American "Mid School" Bicycle Motocross (BMX) and professional mountain cross racer
- Robert E. Kintner (1909–1980), American journalist and television executive, president of both NBC and ABC
- William Kintner (1915–1997), U.S. Ambassador to Thailand (1973–1975) and president of the Foreign Policy Research Institute (1975–1982)

== See also ==
- Kintner House Hotel, located within the Corydon Historic District in Corydon, Indiana, is a historic bed & breakfast
- Kintner-McGrain House, on the National Register of Historic Places, located north of downtown Corydon, Indiana
- Kintner–Withers House, on the National Register of Historic Places, south of Laconia, Indiana, along the Ohio River
