= List of Indiana state historical markers in Harrison County =

Location of Harrison County in Indiana

This is a list of the Indiana state historical markers in Harrison County.

This is intended to be a complete list of the official state historical markers placed in Harrison County, Indiana, United States by the Indiana Historical Bureau. The locations of the historical markers and their latitude and longitude coordinates are included below when available, along with their names, years of placement, and topics as recorded by the Historical Bureau. There are 23 historical markers located in Harrison County.

== Historical markers ==
Marker title	Image	Year placed	Location	Topics
Indiana Capitol		1948	N. Capitol Avenue adjacent to the Harrison County Courthouse in Corydon; 38°12′43″N 86°7′34″W	Politics, Government Institutions, Buildings and Architecture
Battle of Corydon July 9, 1863		1961	300 N. Capitol on the southwestern corner of the Harrison County Courthouse lawn in Corydon; 38°12′42.6″N 86°7′34″W	Military
First State Office Building		1962	Junction of Walnut and Mulberry Streets in Corydon; 38°12′43.6″N 86°7′26.8″W	Government Institutions, Buildings and Architecture, Politics
First State Capital		1962	State Road 62, 0.3 miles east of the State Road 135 junction between Dale and Williar Avenues, in western Corydon; 38°12′41.4″N 86°7′34″W	Politics, Government Institutions
Site of the Battle of Corydon July 9, 1863		1963	Old State Road 135 at the Battle of Corydon Memorial Park entrance, 1 mile south of Corydon; 38°12′0″N 86°7′49″W	Military
Morgan's Raid July 8–13, 1863		1963	Junction of State Roads 11 and 135, north of the Matthew E. Welsh Bridge over the Ohio River; 38°1′24″N 86°11′39″W	Military
Posey House		1965	225 Oak Street in Corydon; 38°12′41″N 86°7′39″W	Politics, Buildings and Architecture
Harrison County Jail		1965	Southwestern corner of the junction of N. Capitol Avenue and Cherry Street in Corydon; 38°12′42″N 86°7′35.4″W	Government Institutions, Buildings and Architecture
Governor's Headquarters		1965	Junction of E. Walnut and N. Elm Streets, northeast of the Harrison County Courthouse in Corydon; 38°12′44.4″N 86°7′30.5″W	Politics, Buildings and Architecture
Presbyterian Church		1965	Junction of E. Walnut and N. Elm Streets, northeast of the Harrison County Courthouse in Corydon; 38°12′44.4″N 86°7′31″W	Religion, Military
Last Home of Squire Boone		1966	Junction of State Roads 11 and 135, north of the Matthew E. Welsh Bridge over the Ohio River; 38°1′24″N 86°11′38.4″W	Early Settlement and Exploration
Walter Q. Gresham		1966	Junction of 2415 Barron Avenue and State Road 62 at the post office in Lanesville; 38°14′16″N 85°59′11″W	Military, Politics
Mt. Solomon Lutheran Church		1966	State Road 62, 5 miles west of Corydon; 38°14′18″N 86°10′54″W	Religion, Early Settlement and Exploration
Cedar Hill Cemetery		1966	Junction of E. Summit and N. Maple Streets in Corydon; 38°12′52″N 86°7′19″W	Cemetery, Military
Harrison County		1966	Southeastern corner of the Harrison County Courthouse lawn at 300 N. Capitol in Corydon; 38°12′42.5″N 86°7′32″W	Early Settlement and Exploration
First State Capital		1978	Northeastern corner of the Old Capitol Grounds along N. Elm Street in Corydon; 38°12′42″N 86°7′32″W	Politics, Government Institutions
Corydon United Methodist Church		1980	214 N. Elm Street, east of the courthouse, in Corydon; 38°12′41″N 86°7′31″W	Religion
Cedar Glade		1992	772 N. Capitol Avenue at the southeastern corner of the Indian Creek bridge in Corydon; 38°13′5″N 86°7′33″W	Buildings and Architecture, Nature and Natural Disasters
Leora Brown School		1995	400 E. Summit Street near the Hill Street junction in Corydon; 38°12′51″N 86°7′16″W	African American, Education
St. Paul African Methodist Episcopal Church		2003	Southeastern corner of the junction of Maple and High Streets in Corydon; 38°12′47.6″N 86°7′19″W	Religion, African American
John Shields, Lewis and Clark Expedition Member		2004	310 N. Elm Street at the Harrison County Convention and Visitors Bureau offices in Corydon; 38°12′42.6″N 86°7′31″W	Early Settlement and Exploration
Oswell Wright		2008	Near the junction of Maple and Chestnut Streets in Corydon; 38°12′37.4″N 86°7′17″W	[none]
Polly Strong Slavery Case		2016	300 N. Capitol Ave., Corydon, between the Harrison County Courthouse and the First State Capitol building 38°12′42″N 86°07′33″W	African American, Law & Court Case, Women

== See also ==
- List of Indiana state historical markers
- National Register of Historic Places listings in Harrison County, Indiana
