= Lucas Oil Rail Lines =

Short line railway in Indiana

Lucas Oil Rail Line
Overview
- Headquarters: Corydon, Indiana
- Reporting mark: LNAL
- Locale: Harrison County, Indiana
- Dates of operation: 2006–present
- Predecessor: Louisville, New Albany & Corydon Railroad

Technical
- Track gauge: 1,435 mm (4 ft 8 1/2 in) (standard gauge)
- Length: 7.7 miles

Lucas Oil Rail Line is a short line railway (reporting mark LNAL) that operates in Harrison County, Indiana, between Corydon Junction and Corydon, a distance of 7.7 miles (12.39 km).

== History ==
On May 25, 2006, the former Louisville, New Albany & Corydon Railroad was sold by its then owner, BPM Rail, Inc., to the line's main customer, Lucas Oil. The line is now owned by a subsidiary of that company, Lucas Rail Lines, Inc. (LRL) and does business as Lucas Oil Rail Line (LNAL). NOTE: The correct reporting marks are LNAL - There are no LORL reporting marks in the Official Railway Equipment Register or railroad reporting marks database.
