= Pinky May =

American baseball player (Merrill Glend May; 1911–2000)

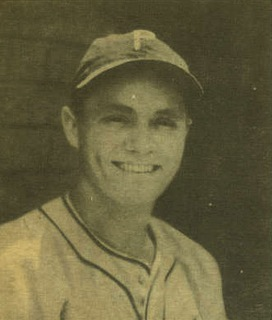
- Third baseman
- Born: January 18, 1911; Laconia, Indiana, U.S.
- Died: September 4, 2000 (aged 89); Corydon, Indiana, U.S.
- Batted: Right Threw: Right

MLB debut
- April 21, 1939, for the Philadelphia Phillies

Last MLB appearance
- October 3, 1943, for the Philadelphia Phillies

MLB statistics
- Batting average: .275
- Home runs: 4
- Runs batted in: 215
- Stats at Baseball Reference

Teams
- Philadelphia Phillies (1939–1943)

Career highlights and awards
- All-Star (1940)

Merrill Glend "Pinky" May (January 18, 1911 – September 4, 2000) was an American professional baseball player and third baseman who appeared in 665 games in Major League Baseball for the Philadelphia Phillies from 1939 through 1943. He later became a longtime manager in the minor leagues and fashioned a 40-year career in organized baseball. He served in the United States Navy during World War II and was the father of former longtime major league catcher Milt May.

== Biography ==
=== Early life and education ===
Born in Laconia, Indiana, May threw and batted right-handed, stood 5 feet 11 inches (1.80 m) tall and weighed 165 pounds (75 kg). His nickname stemmed from his reddish hair. Tommy John, who played under May in the minor leagues, recalled "Pinky was a short man with glasses, a ruddy face, and a sunny disposition."

=== New York Yankees (1932–1938) ===
May signed with the New York Yankees in 1932 after graduating from Indiana University. He spent seven seasons in the Yankee farm system, but his path to the "Bronx Bombers" was blocked by third baseman Red Rolfe. The parent Yankees won four American League pennants and a like number of World Series during May's tenure in their organization.

=== Philadelphia Phillies (1938–1946) ===
Finally, on October 4, 1938, May was drafted out of the Yankee system—but by the Phillies, the worst team in the National League in 1938 with a dismal outlook for their immediate future. During May's five seasons in Philadelphia, the Phils averaged 104 losses a season; they finished eighth and last four times, and seventh once.

May held down the Phillies' regular job at the "hot corner" for all five campaigns. In 1941, he led all National League third basemen in putouts, assists, double plays turned, and range factor; he was consistently among the NL's four top third basemen in those defensive categories throughout his MLB tenure. At the plate, May connected for 610 career hits, including 102 doubles, 11 triples and four home runs, batted .275, and was credited with 215 runs batted in.

=== Player-manager career (1946–1972) ===
Released by the Phils in May 1946 after his discharge from the Navy, May became a player-manager the following season with the Albany Senators of the Eastern League. For the next quarter century, May managed in the farm systems of the Pittsburgh Pirates, Cleveland Indians, Cincinnati Reds and the Yankees, retiring in 1972.

=== Death and legacy ===
Elected to the Indiana Baseball Hall of Fame, he died in Corydon at age 89 on September 4, 2000.

Tommy John recalled that "He knew the game. Pinky was a good field manager, and could scream and yell at the umps with the best of them. But he never blasted his players. He could get into a player when the situation called for it, but he never did so vindictively. He was a family man who knew how to handle young men."
