= Arville Funk =

American lawyer

Arville Lynn Funk (1929–1990) was a United States lawyer, teacher, author, and an Indiana historian. He was born in Harrison County, Indiana, the son of Herman E. and Elsie McGonigle Funk. He attended public school in Corydon and studied law in New Albany. He opened a law practice in Corydon where he lived most of his life.

A member of the Indiana Historical Society and the Harrison County Indiana Historical and Genealogical Society, Funk was most interested in Indiana's Civil War History. He authored several books about Indiana history and commonly wrote an abbreviated version of his larger works dedicated to Harrison County topics. His many books include:

- Tales of Our Hoosier Heritage (1965)
- Indiana's Birthplace: a History of Harrison County, Indiana (1966)
- Our Historic Corydon (1966)
- Hoosiers in the Civil War (1967)
- Harrison County in the Indiana Sesquicentennial Year (1967)
- A Sketchbook of Indiana History (1969)
- The Morgan Raid in Indiana and Ohio (1971)
- Historical Almanac of Harrison County, Indiana (1974)
- Squire Boone in Indiana (1974)
- Revolutionary War Soldiers of Harrison County, Indiana (1975)
- Revolutionary War Era in Indiana (1975)
- The Battle of Corydon (1976)
- Harrison County in the Indiana Sesquicentennial Year (1976)
- A Hoosier Regiment in Dixie: A History of the Thirty-Eighth Indiana Regiment (1978)
- The Hoosier Scrapbook (1981)

He coauthored Indiana's Birthplace: A History of Harrison County, Indiana in 1966 and was a regular contributor the Indiana Magazine of History between 1950 and 1980. He was an advocate of county historical societies and oversaw the creation of historical societies in several Indiana counties.

From 1955 to 1965 he taught high school history. Funk married Rosemary E. Springer on August 25, 1956. They had two children, named Cynthia and Mark. He was admitted to the Indiana bar in 1963 and, in 1965, formed a partnership with Frank O'Bannon and C. Blaine Hays Jr.

Arville Funk died in 1990 and is buried in Corydon's Cedar Hill cemetery.
