= Louisville, New Albany and Corydon Railroad =

Overview
- Headquarters: Corydon, Indiana
- Reporting mark: LNAC
- Locale: Harrison County, Indiana
- Dates of operation: 1887–2006
- Predecessor: Louisville, New Albany and Corydon Railway
- Successor: Lucas Oil Rail Line

Technical
- Track gauge: 1,435 mm (4 ft 8 1/2 in) (standard gauge)
- Length: 7.7 miles

Louisville, New Albany and Corydon Railway
Overview
- Locale: Harrison County, Indiana
- Dates of operation: 1881–1887
- Successor: Louisville, New Albany and Corydon Railroad

Technical
- Track gauge: 1,435 mm (4 ft 8 1/2 in) (standard gauge)
- Length: 7.7 miles

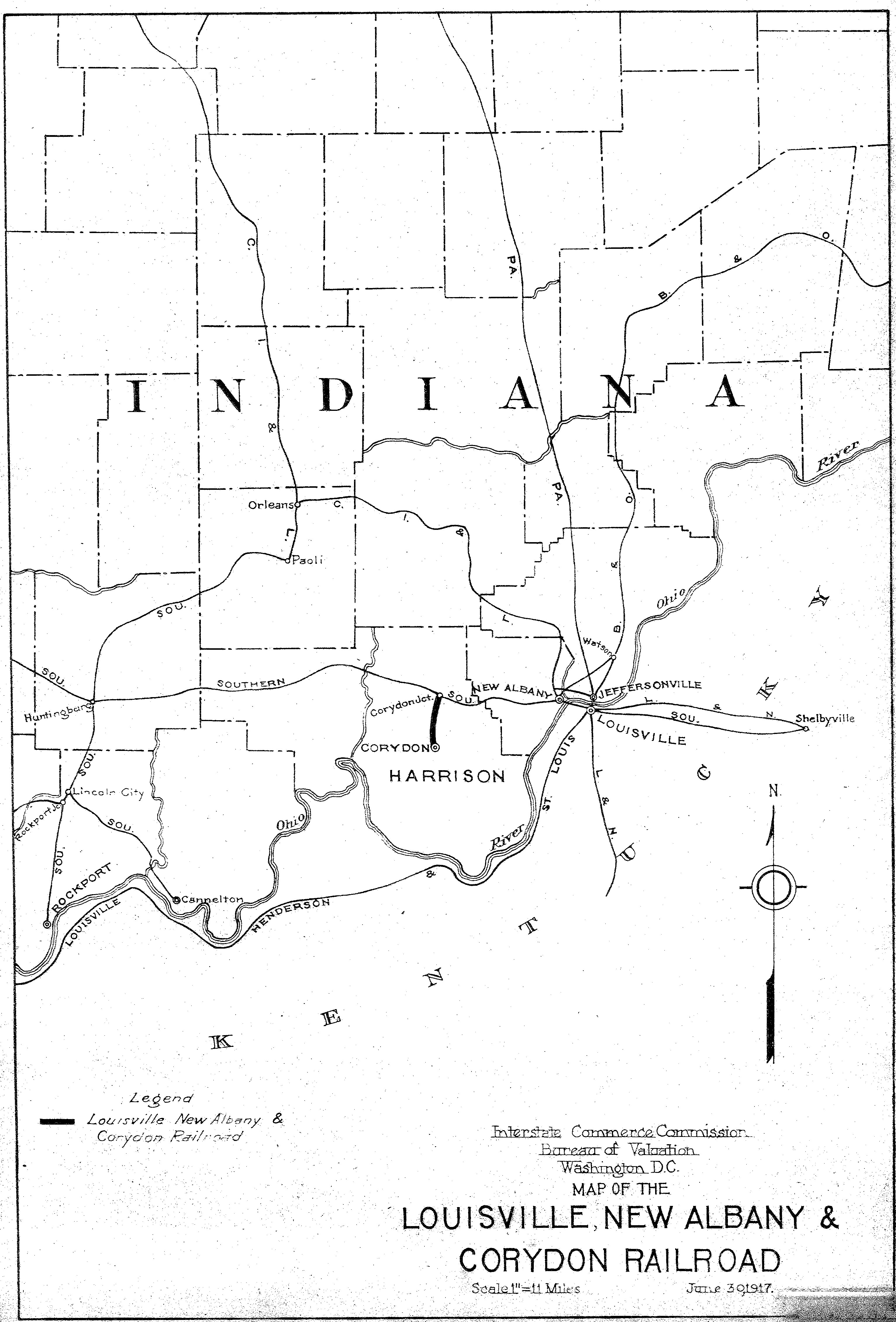
1917 map of the railroad

The Louisville, New Albany and Corydon Railroad was a short line railway (reporting mark LNAC) that operated for over 100 years in Harrison County, Indiana, between Corydon Junction and Corydon, a distance of 7.7 miles (12.39 km). It was sold to its main customer, Lucas Oil, on May 25, 2006. The line is now known as Lucas Oil Rail Line.

== History ==
The LNAC was first established as the Louisville, New Albany and Corydon Railway in 1881, for the purpose of connecting Corydon to the main Louisville-St. Louis line of the then Louisville, New Albany and St. Louis Railway (later acquired by the Southern Railway) that ran a few miles north of town. After construction was completed, the line was opened for business in 1883. In 1887, the company was reorganized as the Louisville, New Albany and Corydon Railroad, a name it kept under various owners for well over a century, until 2006.
