= Samuel P. Hays =

Samuel Pfrimmer Hays (April 5, 1921 – November 22, 2017) was a pioneering environmental, social and political historian of the United States . Born in Corydon, Indiana and raised on a local dairy farm. He earned a B.A. degree from Swarthmore College in 1948, and a Ph.D. at Harvard University under Professor Frederick Merk. He was best known for his work in urban history and his leadership in the new field of American environmental history.

He authored multiple works including

- The Response to Industrialism 1885-1914 (1957).
- Conservation and the Gospel of Efficiency (1959).
- American political history as social analysis (1980).
- Beauty, Health, and Permanence: Environmental Politics in the United States, 1955-1985 (1989).
- Explorations In Environmental History: Essays by Samuel P. Hays (1998)
- A History of Environmental Politics since 1945 (2000).
- Wars in the Woods: The Rise of Ecological Forestry in America (2006).
- The American People and the National Forests: The First Century of the U.S. Forest Service (2009).

He established the Archives of Industrial Society at The University of Pittsburgh where he served as a professor of history from 1960 until 1990.

Hays served as president of the Urban History Association in 1992. In 1997 he came the first recipient of the American Society for Environmental History Distinguished Scholar award. In 1999 he was awarded the Distinguished Service Award from the Organization of American Historians. Hayes was an environmental activist. He owned a 311-acre tract of land in Harrison County, Indiana, near Corydon, and he donated the land to the county as a nature preserve. The county operates it as the Hayswood Nature Reserve.
