= James N. Morgan =

American economist (1918–2018)

James Newton Morgan (March 1, 1918 – January 8, 2018) was an American economist.

Morgan was born near Corydon, Indiana, on March 1, 1918. He obtained a bachelor's degree in economics from Northwestern University in 1939. He then worked for the North Appalachian Experimental Watershed of the Soil Conservation Service before returning to school, receiving a master's and doctoral degree in economics from Harvard University. Upon completing his doctorate, Morgan was named an assistant professor at Brown University. In 1949, Morgan began post doctoral work at the University of Michigan. He became an associate professor in 1953, and was named a full professor five years later. Morgan developed SEARCH, a data analysis program, during the 1960s, and became the first director of the Panel Study of Income Dynamics in 1968. Over the course of his career, Morgan was named a member of the National Academy of Sciences, and fellow of the American Statistical Association, Gerontological Society of America, and American Academy of Arts and Sciences. He retired in December 1987, and died on January 8, 2018, at the University of Michigan Hospital.
