= Paul and Susannah Mitchem =

Paul and Susannah Mitchem (fl. 1772–1814) were a couple from Virginia who owned dozens of slaves; late in their life they decided to bring their slaves to Harrison County, Indiana, and free them. They also used the Meachum surname. The Mitchems emancipated over 100 enslaved people in Indiana, most of whom settled around Corydon, Indiana. Farms, businesses, churches, and schools were established by and for the African American community, often called the Mitchem Settlement.

== Background ==
At the beginning of the 19th century, Indiana was part of the Northwest Territory. The Northwest Ordinance of 1787 prohibited slavery, but it was tolerated. In 1810, there were 12 free blacks and 21 who were enslaved. Indentured servitude was used to circumvent anti-slavery laws.

Most of the area residents were intolerant of blacks. So, African Americans tended to establish themselves near Quaker settlements, because the Friends were prone to looking out for the neighbors, and they also helped runaway slaves travel through the area on the Underground Railroad.

== Biography ==
Paul Mitchem was born in Enfield, Connecticut in 1749. On January 2, 1772, he married Susannah Meeks in Goochland County, Virginia. He served as a private during the Revolutionary War.

Paul Mitchem lived in Goochland County, Virginia in 1789 when the enslaved John Berry Meachum was born, whom he owned. At some point, Mitchem inherited a number of slaves and he had about 20 enslaved people when he moved to North Carolina around 1800. He increased the number of slaves he owned to 48. He had emancipated some of his slaves while living on the east coast. After nine or ten years, the Mitchems moved to Hardin County, Kentucky, where Susannah's brothers lived. In 1810, they lived in Elizabethtown, Kentucky and had an adult male between 24 and 44 living with them, as well as 27 enslaved people. They purchased land in Kentucky and they then had about 90 slaves.

John Berry Meachum was allowed to be hired out and attained his freedom at the age of 21 after saving his share of his earnings from working at a saltpeter cave and as a carpenter. He purchased his father's freedom in Virginia and back in Kentucky he bought his mother and siblings freedom. His family then settled in Harrison County, Indiana, while Meachum remained in Kentucky and married an enslaved woman named Mary.

The Mitchems lived in Kentucky around five years when they decided to move north. According to Meachum, Mitchem asked him to guide a caravan of slaves outside of Kentucky. He agreed and in 1814, he led the group across the Ohio River to Harrison County, Indiana. The Mitchems moved with group of 75 or around 100 African Americans to ensure their safety, and that they were not enslaved again. Indiana was appealing because government land was about $1.25 (equivalent to $19 in 2025) per acre.

When the caravan arrived in Harrison County, residents organized a mob that ran the group out of the area. Paul and Susannah Mitchem settled at Mauckport. Most of the former slaves settled around the town of Corydon in Harrison County. Some people lived in Boone, Harrison, Heth, and Webster townships. Each family was given some money to start their new lives.

The Mitchems emancipated over 100 enslaved people, with the transactions recorded in Harrison County's deed books. For instance, Milly Mitchem Finley and her five children were emancipated on May 9, 1815. Most of the new residents had the Mitchem surname, but there were also Carters, Cousins, and Finleys. They generally settled on their own farms, but there were also business owners and Littleton Mitchem was a physician for 70 years. Littleton came to Indiana when he was 12 years old and lived to the age of 106.

Paul Mitchem oversaw educational and vocational training for the settlement members. The Pioneer Founders of Indiana organization states that Mitchem lived to the age of 110, dying in 1824. (Note: If that is true, he would have been born around 1714.) The Mitchems were buried in a graveyard about six miles west of Corydon, near White Cloud, and along the Blue River. They had unmarked graves, and Isaiah Mitchem and other descendants of the freed people raised funds in 1908 for their monuments. Most of the Mitchem Settlement members were buried in the Cedar Hill cemetery at Corydon, which is not segregated. There were also three Mitchem family cemeteries.

== Mitchem Settlement legacy ==
An African Methodist Episcopal Church was established in Corydon in 1843 by William Paul Quinn, a missionary born in India, and former slaves. Around 1851, a combination school and church was built in downtown Corydon to serve the African American community. More blacks moved into Harrison County after the end of the Civil War, most of the settlers were from Meade County, Kentucky. The Collins Chapel and school was founded in 1868 in Boone Township and was later closed. About 1882, the St. Paul African Methodist Episcopal Church was established, and there are now more white than black members at the church. There was also an unnamed church established on the South Hill. The Corydon Colored School was built in 1891. It was the first school in the state for African-American children and is now listed on the Indiana Register of Historic Sites and Structures.
