= John Shields (explorer) =

Member of the Lewis and Clark Expedition (1769–1809)

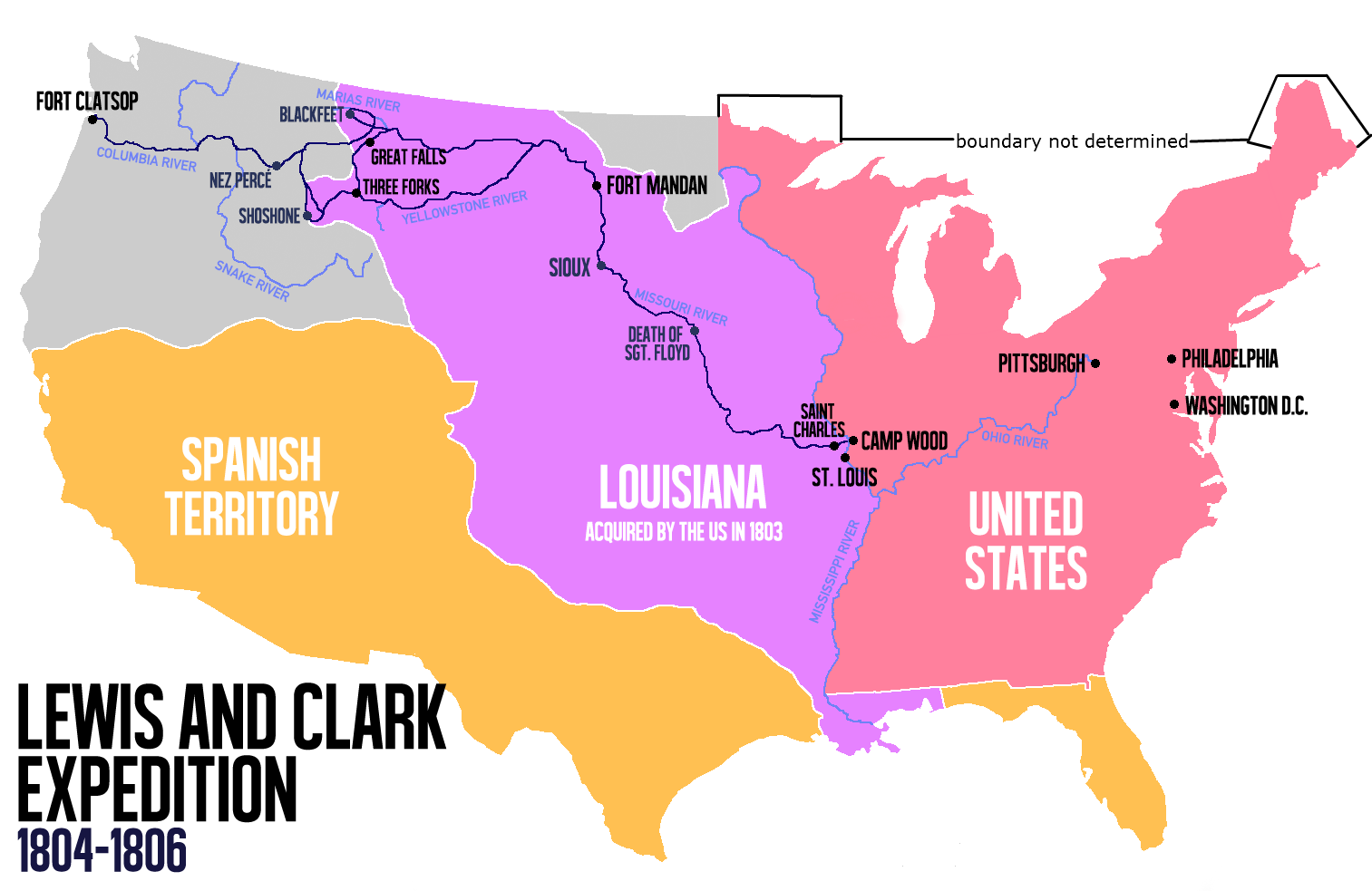
Route of the expedition

Private John Shields (c. 1769–1809) was, at about 35 years old, the second oldest member of the Lewis and Clark Expedition and its oldest enlisted member. Shields, born in Virginia's Shenandoah Valley, moved at about 14 years old to the wilderness of Tennessee, helped build and lived in a family fort that provided protection from Native Americans, traveled with Captain Meriwether Lewis, Second Lieutenant William Clark, and Native American Sacagawea to the Oregon Coast where he helped build Fort Clatsop, and then returned to St. Louis, Missouri. At the completion of this great adventure Shields hunted and trapped with the famous American pioneer Daniel Boone.

== Early life ==
Shields was born about 1769 Virginia's Shenandoah Valley. He was born in what was then Augusta County, but is now Rockingham County, Virginia. He was one of twelve children of Robert Shields and Nancy Stockton. Robert and Nancy Stockton Shields are known as the "Parents of the Ten Brothers." Richard, David and William were all elder siblings, followed by John himself, James, Joseph, Arnett, Ezekial (who did not survive his first year), Benjamin, Joshua and Robert. Jennet, the only daughter, married Joshua Tipton. Their son, John Tipton, became a brigadier general and later a US Senator for the state of Indiana. In about 1784 the Shields family moved from Virginia to what is now Sevier County, Tennessee, and settled on the south side of the French Broad River. John and his brothers helped his parents to build Shields Fort, which is located where modern-day Pigeon Forge is, near where the Dollywood theme park currently stands. Some of the cabins found in Cades Cove near Pigeon Forge were also built by the Shields family.

== Family ==
In about 1790 John Shields married Nancy White. Their daughter, Martha Jennette, married her 1st cousin John Tipton. He became a brigadier general and a US Senator for the state of Indiana. The Shields family and the Tipton family were neighbors in the 1790s when they lived in what is now Sevier County, Tennessee. John Tipton was a son of Joshua and Jennet Shields Tipton.

== Lewis & Clark Expedition ==
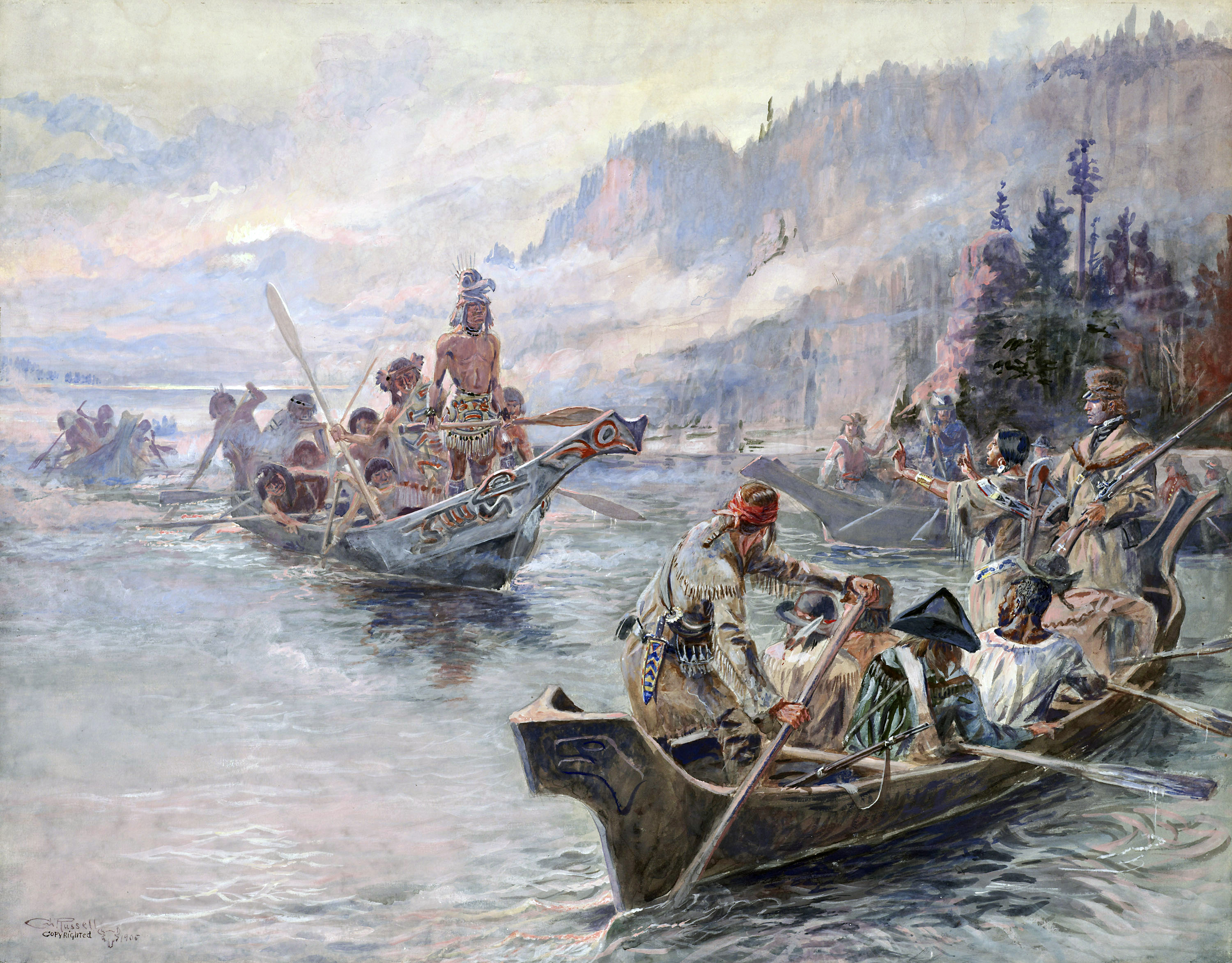
Corps of Discovery meet Chinooks on the Lower Columbia, October 1805 (Charles Marion Russel, c. 1905)

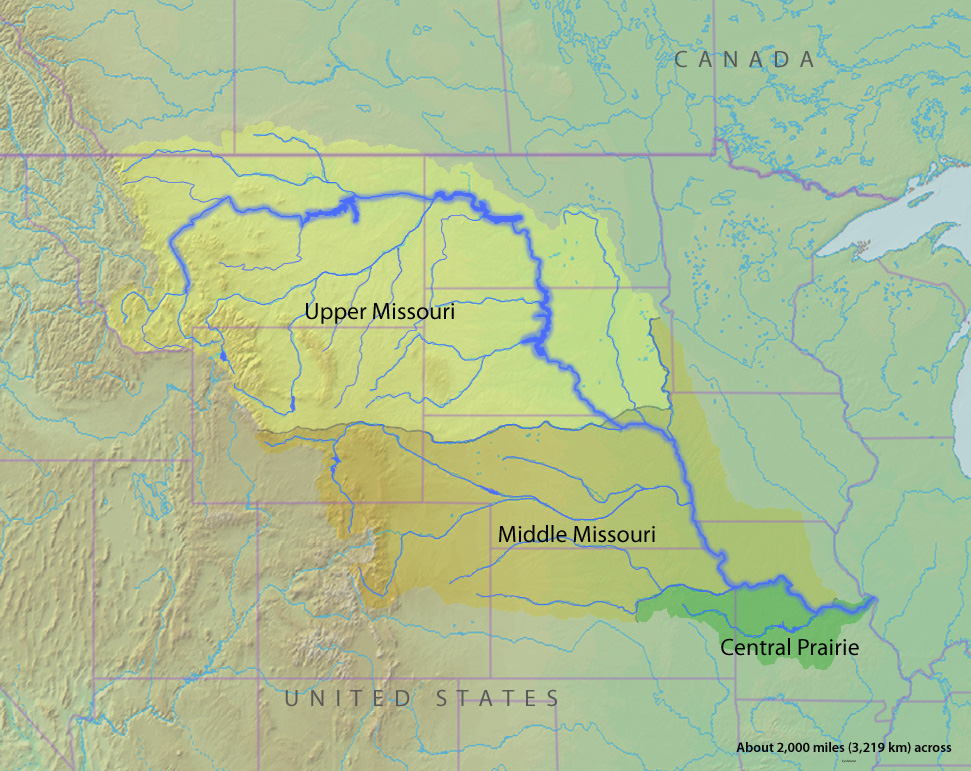
Freshwater ecoregions of the Missouri basin

Shields was a private for the Lewis & Clark Expedition from October 19, 1803, until October 10, 1806. Despite the captains' rule that they would only consider unmarried men for the exploring enterprise, they recruited Shields. He acted as a gunsmith, blacksmith, hunter, and scout for the duration of the expedition.

In December 1803 the members of the Lewis and Clark Expedition started construction of Camp Dubois, also known as Camp Wood, their winter camp of 1803–1804. Located next to the Mississippi River, and at the mouth of Wood River, the camp was in what was then St. Clair County, now Madison County, Illinois. They stayed at Camp Dubois until May 14, 1804, when they crossed the Mississippi River and started up the Missouri River (at 2,341 miles long it is the longest river in North America). On March 29, 1804, while still at Camp Dubois, Private John Colter and Shields (second cousins) threatened Sergeant John Ordway's life. They were put on trial for mutiny, but they were both spared. (See John Ordway for more information.)

Journals of the Lewis and Clark Expedition

Journal of Captain Meriwether Lewis:

- "6th February Wednesday 1805 . . . Shields killed three antelopes this evening. the blacksmiths [John Shields, William Bratton, and Alexander Willard] take a considerable quantity of corn today in payment for their labour. the blacksmith's have proved a happy resoce to us in our present situation as I believe it would have been difficult to have devised any other method to have procured corn from the natives. the Indians are extravegantly fond of sheet iron of which they form arrow-points and manufacter into instruments for scraping and dressing their buffaloe robes - I permited the blacksmith to dispose of a part of a sheet-iron callaboos [stove] which had been nearly birnt out on our passage up the river, and for each piece about four inches square he obtained from seven to eight gallons of corn from the natives who appeared extremely pleased with the exchange"

Journal of Second Lieutenant William Clark:

- "Friday June 13th 1806 . . . Soon after they Set out all of our hunters returned each with a deer except Shields who brought two"
- "Wednesday July 2nd 1806 . . . had all of our arms put in the most prime order two of the rifles have unfortunately burst near the muscle, Shields Cut them off and they Shute tolerable well"

Journal of Sergeant John Ordway:

- "Wednesday 1st August 1804 . . . Shields went out a short time and killed & brought in a Deer."
- "Friday 14th Sept. 1804 . . . John Shields who went on Shore with the horse killed a verry large white rabbit or haire it was as big as a Ureopian hare. - nearly all white - & of a different description of any one ever yet Seen in the States." The first description of the white-tailed jackrabbit, Lepus townsendii previously unknown to science. John Shields discovered what was later named a Jack rabbit.
- "Monday 4th Feby. 1805 . . . Shields went out a Short time in this bottom and killed two Deer."
- "Wednesday 6th Feby. 1805 . . . Shields went out towards evening to hunt & killed 3 Goats which we brought in and eat the meat."

== Post-expedition ==
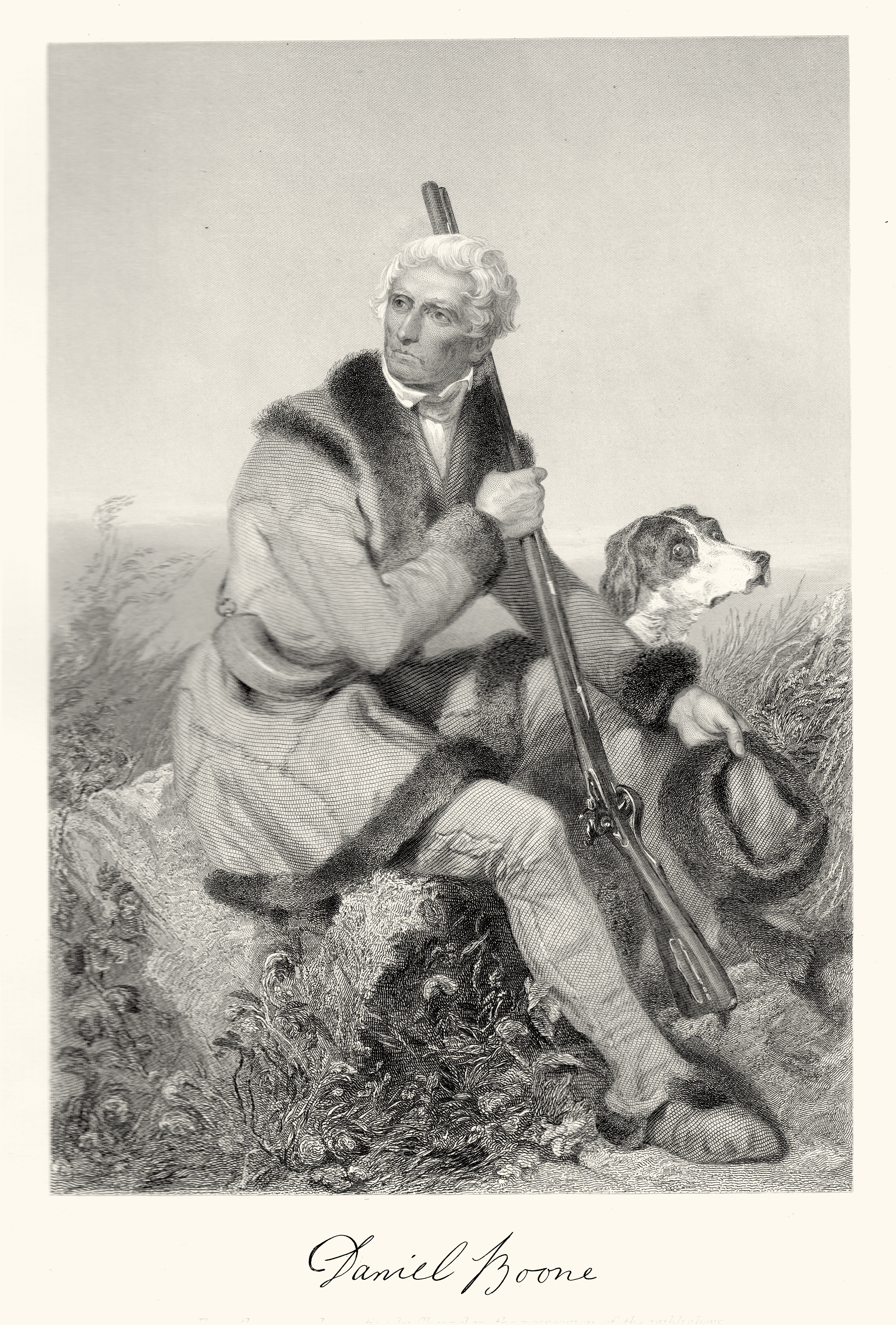
This engraving by Alonzo Chappel (c. 1861) depicts an elderly Boone hunting in Missouri.

In 1799 the famous American pioneer Daniel Boone (1734–1820) moved to what is now St. Charles County, Missouri, where he lived about 50 miles up the Missouri River from St. Louis, Missouri, where the expedition started and finished. "In 1804 Meriwether Lewis and William Clark visited Boone before embarking on their expedition, gathering valuable information about the lands to the west, which Boone had not been able to resist exploring." The Lewis and Clark Expedition passed near Boone's residence on the way up the Missouri River in 1804 and again on the way down the river in 1806. When Shields returned from the expedition to the Oregon Coast he hunted and trapped in Missouri with Daniel Boone. Shields later moved to Harrison County, Indiana, where he hunted and trapped with Squire Boone, a brother of Daniel Boone. Some historians show that John Shields was a "kinsman" of Daniel Boone, but there does not appear to be any evidence they were related.

On January 15, 1807, Captain Meriwether Lewis wrote to the US Secretary of War Henry Dearborn: "John Sheilds [sic] has received the pay only of a private. Nothing was more peculiarly useful to us in various situations than the skill and ingenuity of this man as an artist, in repairing our guns, accoutrements, &c. and should it be thought proper to allow him something as an artificer, he has well deserved it."

Shields settled in Indiana by June 1807 and was appointed captain of the Clark County militia in July 1807. In December 1809, Shields died in Harrison County and is buried at the Little Flock Baptist Cemetery, in Crandall, Harrison County, Indiana.

The Shields River, a tributary of the Yellowstone River, just east of Livingston, Montana, was named in his honor.

A state historical marker to his memory is erected near the Harrison County Courthouse in Corydon, Indiana. Shields' historical marker shows that he was a gunsmith and blacksmith in the Lewis and Clark Expedition, and that after his return he moved to Clark County, Indiana, and that in 1809 he died in Harrison County, Indiana.

== Gravesite and headstone ==
There is a headstone for Private John Shields (1769–1809) in the Little Flock Baptist Cemetery, Elizabeth, Harrison County, Indiana. The inscription shows that Shields was a private in the U.S. Army and a member of the Lewis and Clark Expedition. It also shows that besides his duties as a gunsmith, blacksmith, and hunter, he was also a scout and mechanic.
