= Hayswood Nature Reserve =

Nature reserve in Indiana, United States

Coordinates: 38.208°N 86.143°W

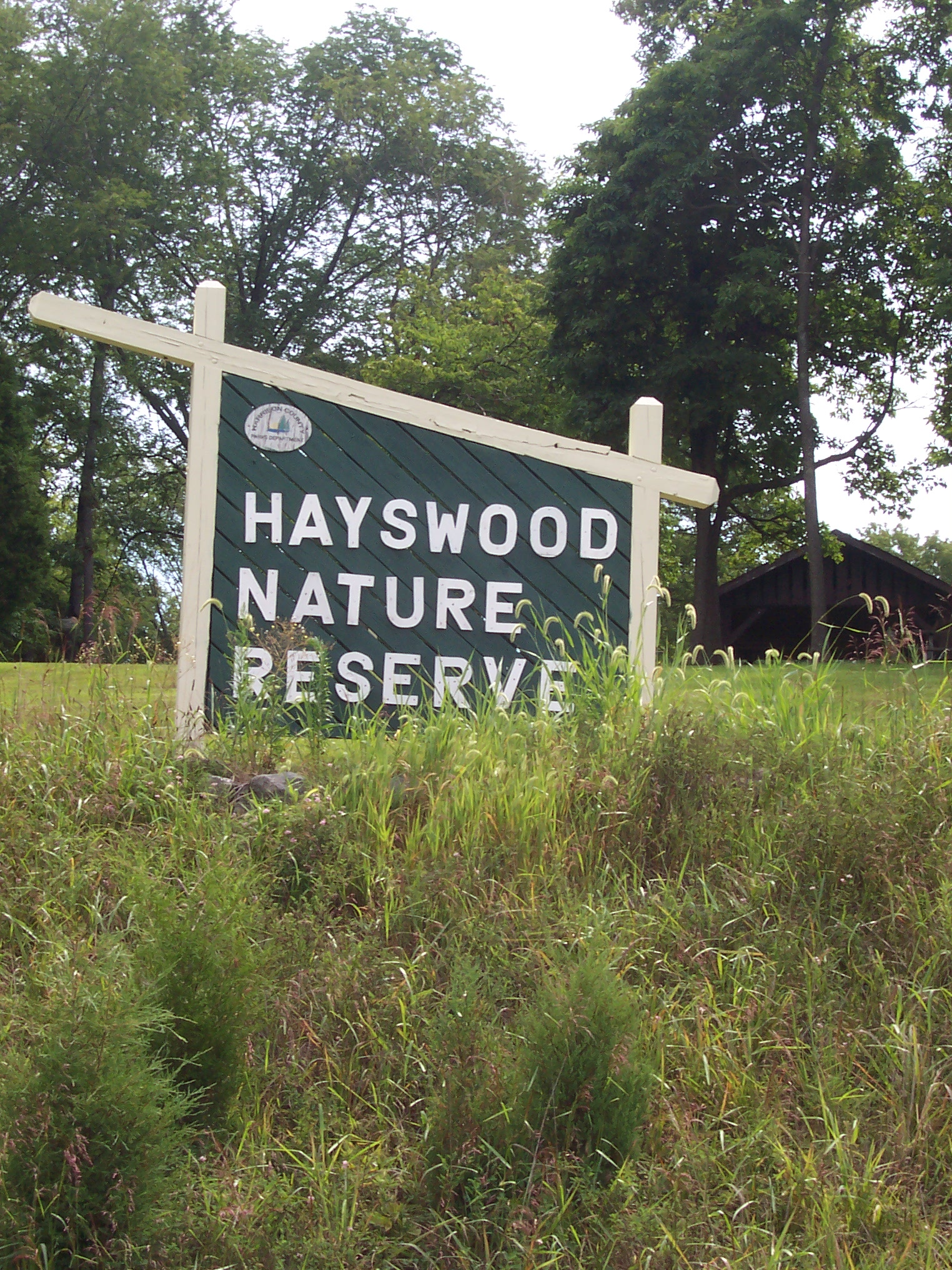
Park Entrances

The Hayswood Nature Preserve is a county park in the United States, owned by the Harrison County, Indiana Park and Recreation Board.

== The Samuel P. Hays donation ==
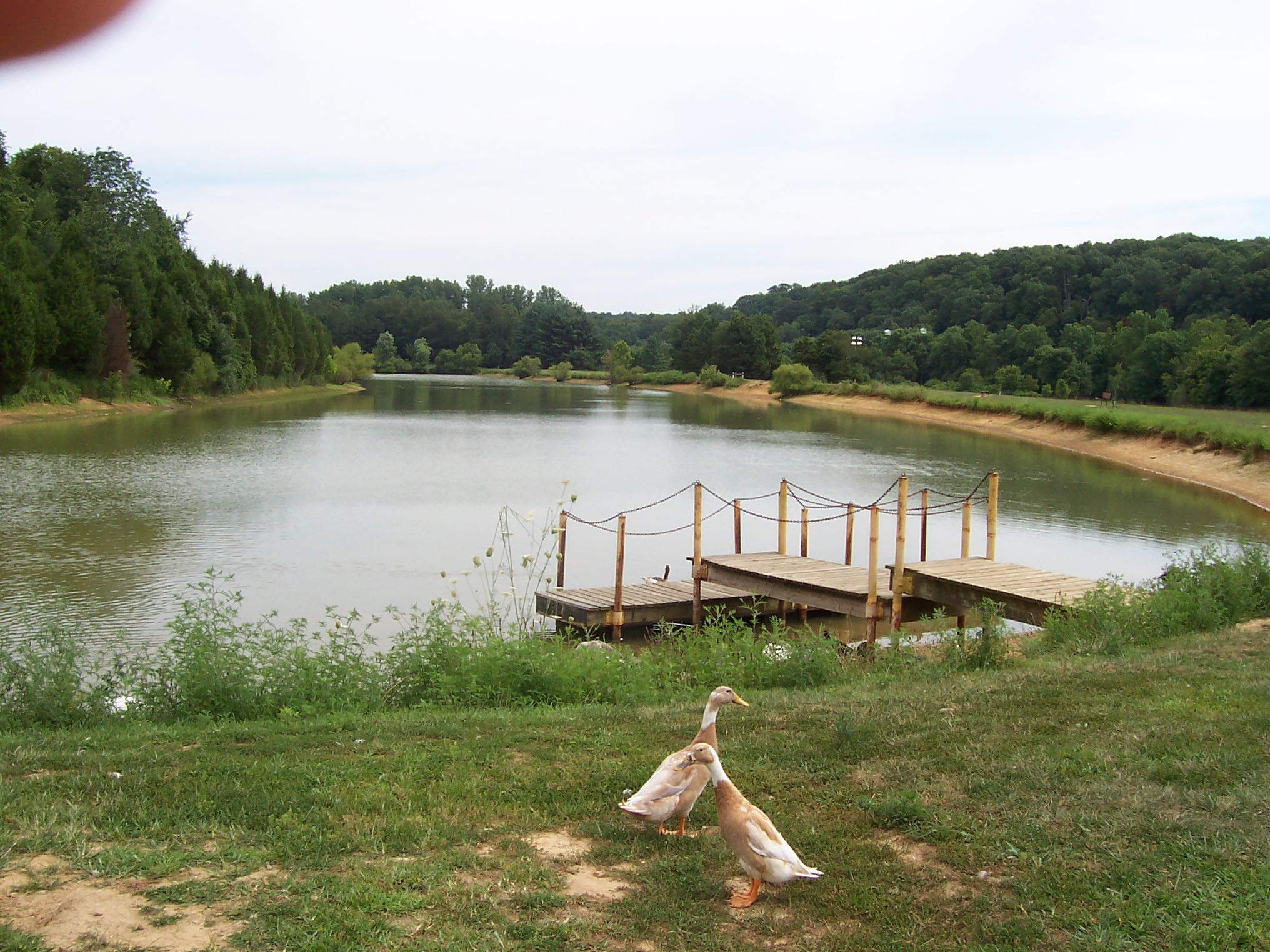
Duck Pond

The preserve was donated to the citizens of Harrison County in 1969 by Samuel P. Hays, A Corydon native and Professor Emeritus of History at the University of Pittsburgh. The parks board developed a portion of the land in 1973 for public use, but the majority of the land remains in its original condition to be preserved for the future. Although the entire park is open to the public, the nature reserve area is to always kept free of development to continue Hays' dream of natural preservation of the land.

The park property has a history as interesting as its nature. The property was previously owned by Henry L. Fabrique. In 1820 he constructed a water mill in the curve of Indian Creek. He later sold the mill to John Peter Mauck, the founder of Mauckport, whose family operated the mill until the advent of electricity in the 1920s. The same mill was one of many threatened with burning by Confederate General John Hunt Morgan after the Battle of Corydon.

== Park area ==
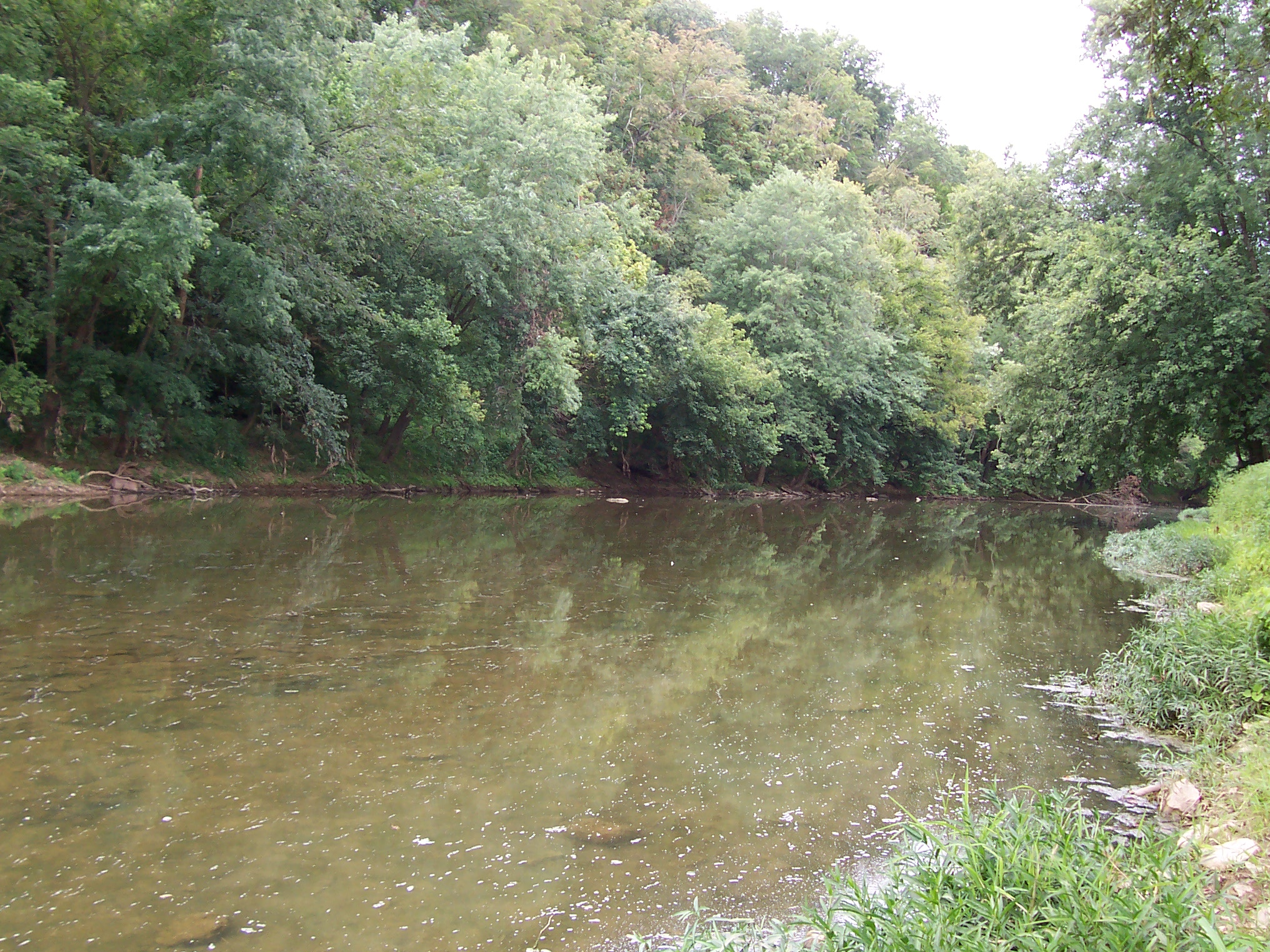
Big Indian Creek flows along the southern edge of the park

This park preserve covers 311 acres (1.26 km^{2}) and includes the Pilot Knob, the surrounding forest, and several rock outcrops overlooking Indian Creek that runs along the eastern side of the park. The forest consists largely of oak-hickory forest with beech-maple forest closer to the creek.

The park has a paved looped hiking trail along the north part of the park. There is a large playground on the western side, a fishing lake near the creek, primitive restrooms, and picnic areas. The Doolittle section of the Indian Creek Trail passes through the park and features a walking bridge over the creek.

== See also ==
- Corydon, Indiana

== Gallery ==
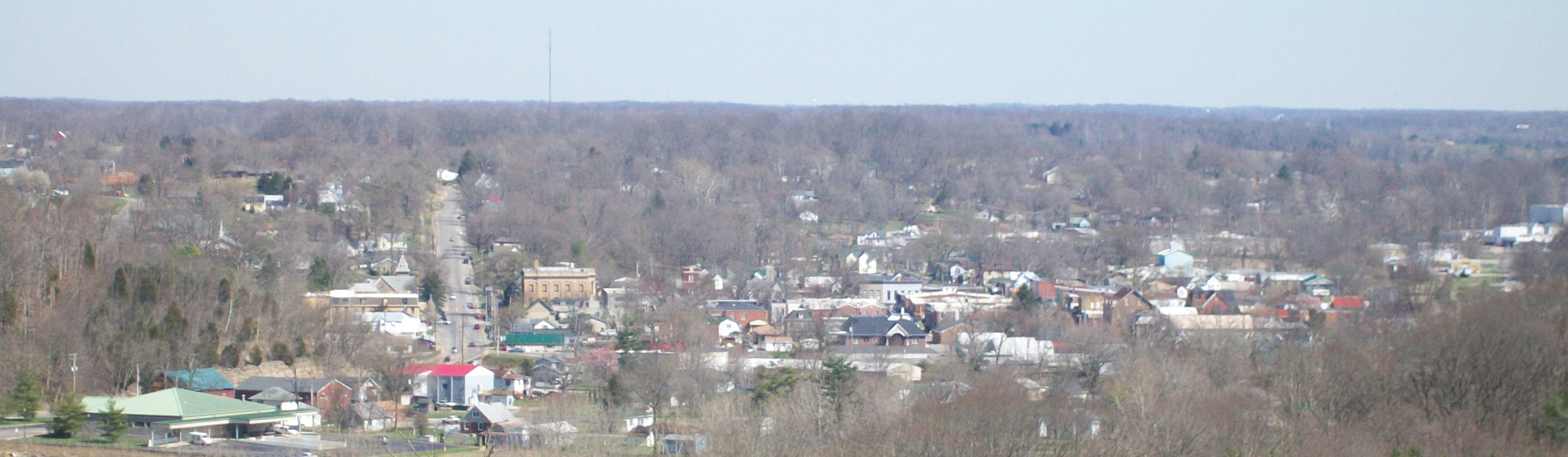
Downtown Corydon viewed from the Pilot Knob in the Hayswood Nature Reserve

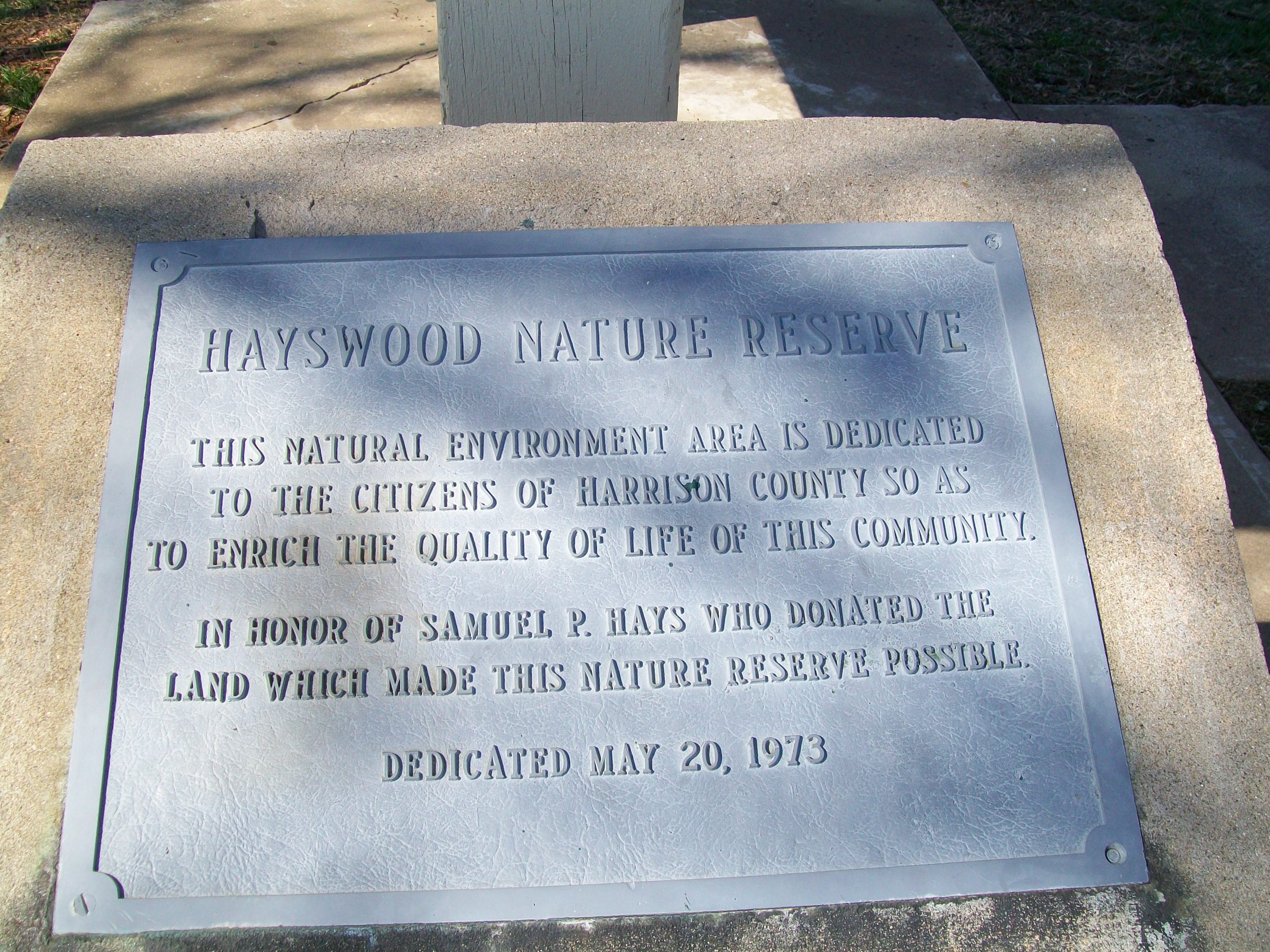
Reserve's dedication marker
