= Butt Drugs =

Drugstore in Corydon, Indiana, US

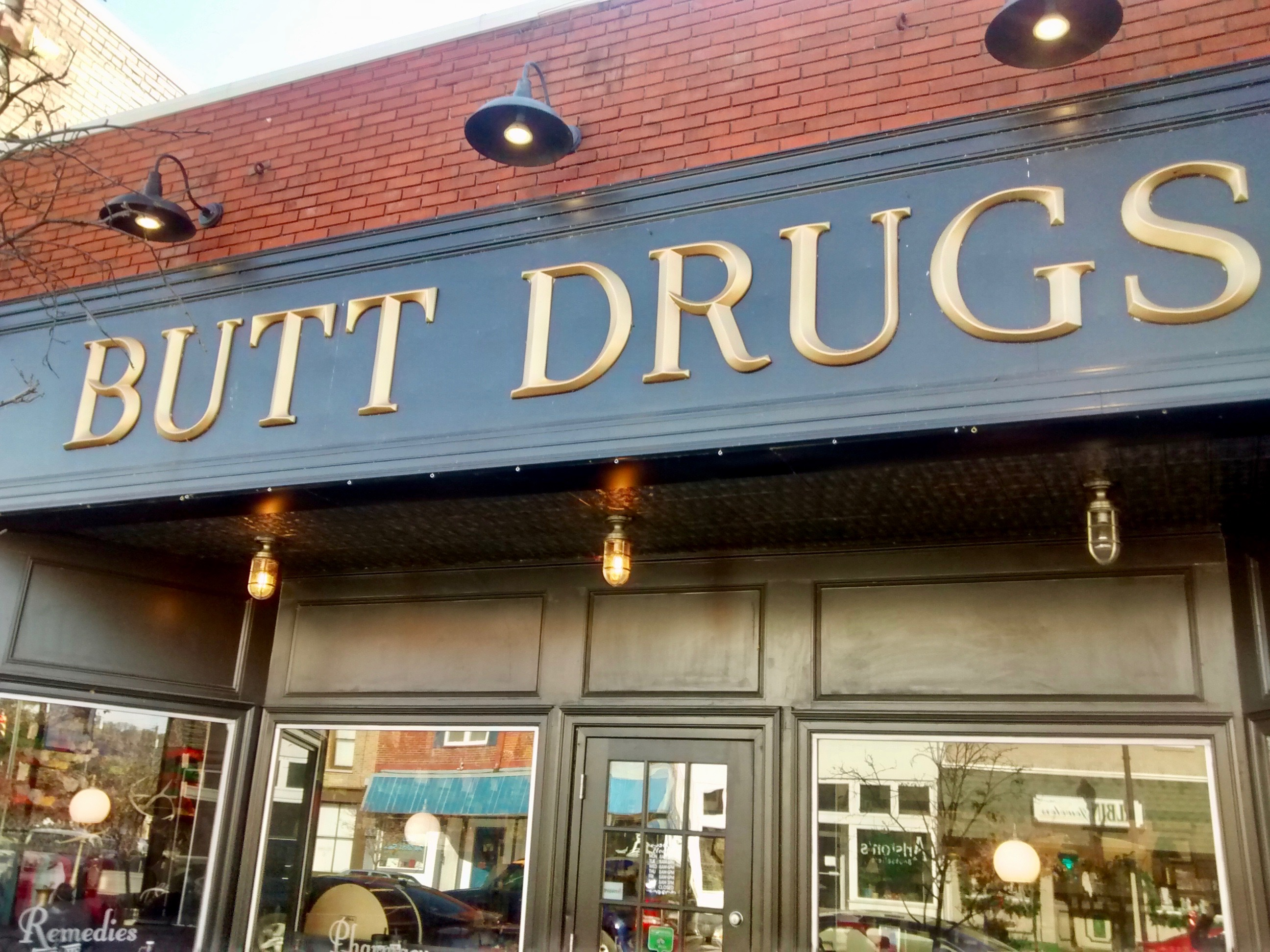
- Company type: Pharmacy
- Founded: 1952
- Founder: William H. Butt
- Defunct: 2023
- Area served: Corydon, Indiana, U.S.

Butt Drugs was a drugstore in Corydon, Indiana, United States. Founded in 1952 by William H. Butt, the store operated until 2023. Butt Drugs was known for its unusual name, soda fountain, and service. The store gained further attention in 2010 when it was the subject of a commercial by YouTube personalities Rhett & Link. After years of declining sales, the store was shuttered in 2023.

== History ==
William H. Butt founded the drugstore, originally known as William H. Butt Drugs and later as Butt Rexall, in 1952. It was located at 115 East Chestnut Street in downtown Corydon, Indiana. By 1998, the pharmacy was franchised as Valu-Rite and had just completed a renovation. William Butt sold the store to his granddaughter Katie Butt Beckort in 2001; she had been an employee of the store for several years prior.

The drugstore was noted as a local attraction in Corydon, due in part to its unique name. It also retained an operational soda fountain and offered 35-cent cups of coffee for patrons. Additionally, the store offered curb-side service to deliver prescriptions to customers' vehicles. A 2019 article published by WCPO stated that the store was known for its "priority on family friendly service" and was considered an integral part of the community. Its owners sold merchandise playing on the company name, such as T-shirts reading "I love Butt Drugs" and fanny packs, both of which were also sold online. The owners made further puns on the name by naming their liquor department Butt Liquors and advertising free parking in the rear.

In 2010, YouTube personalities Rhett & Link gave the store further attention when, as part of a project to film commercials for small local businesses, they recorded one for Butt Drugs. The commercial features the two singing a jingle about the store over footage of employees and customers. The two were recommended the business by a fan, and thought the recommendation was a joke until they visited Corydon and considered the business suitable for a commercial. Employees of Butt Drugs noted that sales of T-shirts for the store increased greatly after Rhett & Link's commercial became a viral video. The commercial was also shared on The Ellen DeGeneres Show and by Howard Stern.

Despite the popularity from this commercial, the store continued to decline in profitability for many years, ultimately closing in May 2023. Customers' prescriptions were transferred to the town's CVS. After the store's closing, the soda fountain was reinstalled at 1819 General Store in nearby Elizabeth, Indiana.
