= Laconia, Indiana =

Town of Laconia, Indiana
- Town
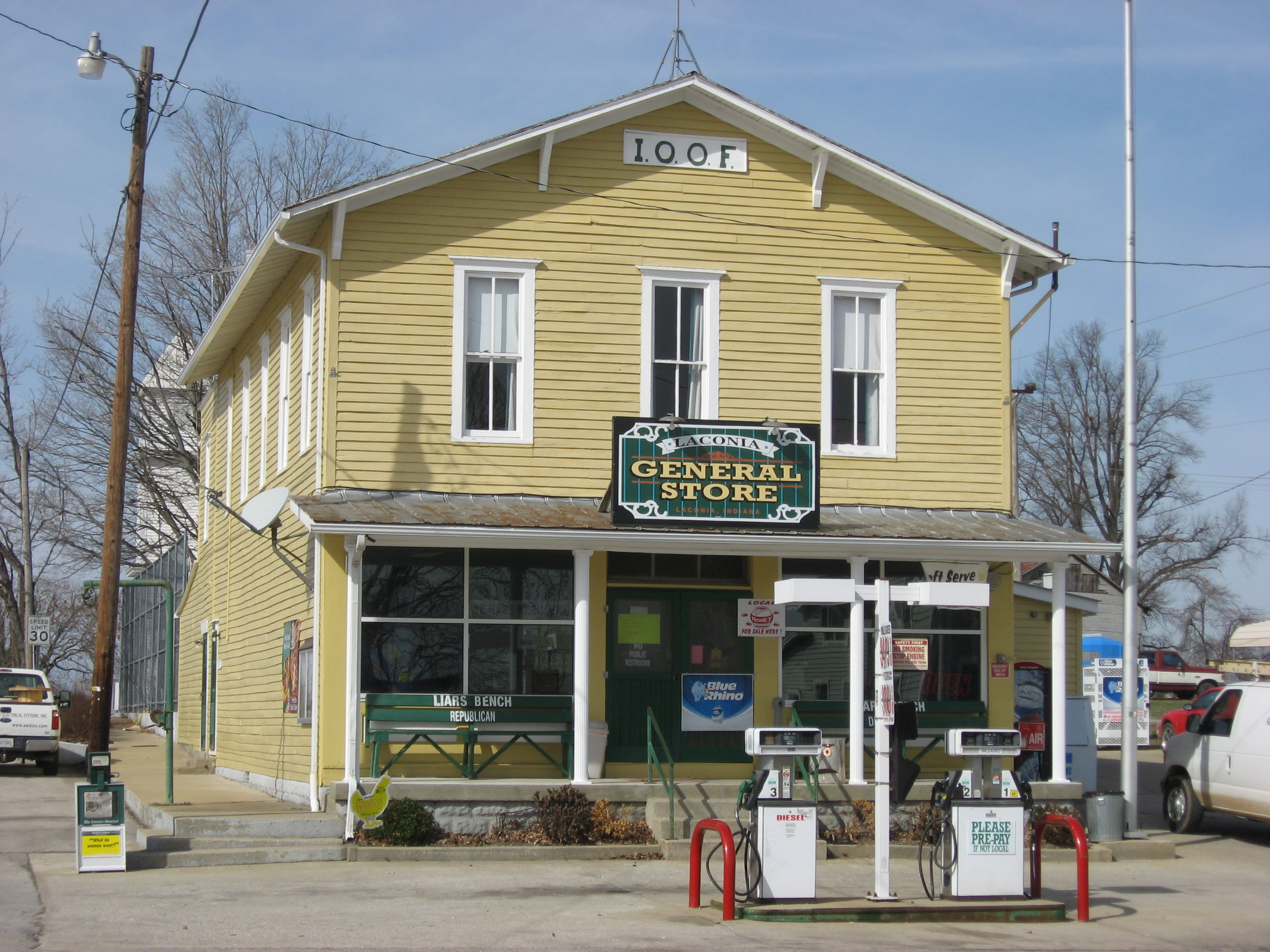
- The Laconia General Store, located at the heart of the community

- Location of Laconia in Harrison County, Indiana.
- Coordinates: 38°1′56″N 86°5′7″W
- Country: United States
- State: Indiana
- County: Harrison
- Township: Boone

Area
  - Total: 0.050 sq mi (0.13 km^{2})
  - Land: 0.050 sq mi (0.13 km^{2})
  - Water: 0 sq mi (0.00 km^{2})
- Elevation: 663 ft (202 m)

Population (2020)
  - Total: 73
  - Density: 1,444.8/sq mi (557.84/km^{2})
- Time zone: UTC-5 (EST)
  - Summer (DST): UTC-4 (EDT)
- ZIP code: 47135
- Area code: 812
- FIPS code: 18-40644
- GNIS feature ID: 2396701

Laconia is a town in Boone Township, Harrison County, Indiana, United States. The population was 73 at the 2020 census.

== Geography ==
Laconia is located at 38°1′56″N 86°5′7″W (38.032174, -86.085271).

According to the 2010 census, Laconia has a total area of 0.05 square miles (0.13 km^{2}), all land.

== History ==
Laconia is a small farming community and was platted in 1816 by John Boone. The Boone family, prominent in the settlement of southern Harrison County, owned large tracts of land throughout the township which bears their name. The original town, consisting of 64 lots, was laid out on property of four owners: William Smith, William Winigar, William Williams, and William Madden Sr.

Because Laconia was the only town of any size in Boone Township, the settlement became the commercial center of the area. Laconia was the distribution center for mail and was served by the L&N Railroad, which ran on the Kentucky side of the Ohio River.

Because of the proximity of an ample supply of lumber, the Elbert Brothers established a furniture factory near Laconia in 1868. The business burned in 1880 and was never rebuilt. Just south of town, John Ashton had a lumber mill which provided materials for many of Laconia's structures.

Laconia at one time boasted three general stores, one on each corner of the town square, three hotels, several millinery stores, two doctors, a funeral parlor, and a saloon. The Laconia General Store, built in 1927, is the only remaining commercial building operating on the square.

Laconia is the home of an Odd Fellows Club first organized on May 20, 1875.

Two churches were established in Laconia. The Laconia Presbyterian Church was organized in 1874 and met in the town hall and private homes until 1880, when the present church was built on Cross St. The Laconia Methodist Church was organized in 1842. The minister traveled from Mauckport, about seven miles to the southwest, to conduct services. The present church was built in 1874 on Main St.

In March 1932, fire destroyed the frame two-story school known as Clay Hill College, and a new school was built of brick in 1932–1933 by the Works Progress Administration (WPA). Upon consolidation of the Harrison County Schools, the building was vacated in 1985. The late Bill Cook restored the structure and it now serves as a community center and apartments.

Another notable building in Laconia is on Main St, the Hurst House built in the Greek Revival style by Dr. Hurst in 1869.

== Demographics ==
Historical population
Census	Pop.	Note	%±
1880	112		—
1890	133		18.8%
1900	135		1.5%
1910	82		−39.3%
1920	83		1.2%
1930	103		24.1%
1940	83		−19.4%
1950	82		−1.2%
1960	75		−8.5%
1970	64		−14.7%
1980	58		−9.4%
1990	75		29.3%
2000	29		−61.3%
2010	50		72.4%
2020	73		46.0%
U.S. Decennial Census

=== 2010 census ===
As of the census of 2010, there were 50 people, 21 households, and 15 families living in the town. The population density was 1,000.0 inhabitants per square mile (386.1/km^{2}). There were 25 housing units at an average density of 500.0 per square mile (193.1/km^{2}). The racial makeup of the town was 98.0% White and 2.0% Asian.

There were 21 households, of which 23.8% had children under the age of 18 living with them, 61.9% were married couples living together, 9.5% had a female householder with no husband present, and 28.6% were non-families. 19.0% of all households were made up of individuals, and 4.8% had someone living alone who was 65 years of age or older. The average household size was 2.38 and the average family size was 2.73.

The median age in the town was 41 years. 16% of residents were under the age of 18; 16% were between the ages of 18 and 24; 22% were from 25 to 44; 40% were from 45 to 64; and 6% were 65 years of age or older. The gender makeup of the town was 48.0% male and 52.0% female.

=== 2000 census ===
As of the census of 2000, there were 29 people, 14 households, and 6 families living in the town. The population density was 583.2 inhabitants per square mile (225.2/km^{2}). There were 18 housing units at an average density of 362.0 per square mile (139.8/km^{2}). The racial makeup of the town was 100.00% White.

There were 14 households, out of which 21.4% had children under the age of 18 living with them, 28.6% were married couples living together, 14.3% had a female householder with no husband present, and 57.1% were non-families. 57.1% of all households were made up of individuals, and 35.7% had someone living alone who was 65 years of age or older. The average household size was 2.07 and the average family size was 3.50.

In the town, the population was spread out, with 27.6% under the age of 18, 3.4% from 18 to 24, 24.1% from 25 to 44, 27.6% from 45 to 64, and 17.2% who were 65 years of age or older. The median age was 40 years. For every 100 females, there were 45.0 males. For every 100 females age 18 and over, there were 40.0 males.

The median income for a household in the town was $16,667, and the median income for a family was $17,083. Males had a median income of $23,750 versus $16,250 for females. The per capita income for the town was $9,779. There were 60.0% of families and 50.0% of the population living below the poverty line, including 81.8% of under eighteens and none of those over 64.

== Notable people ==
- Pinky May, Philadelphia Phillies third baseman
- Gary Timberlake, Seattle Pilots pitcher
