= Kintner–Withers House =

- U.S. National Register of Historic Places
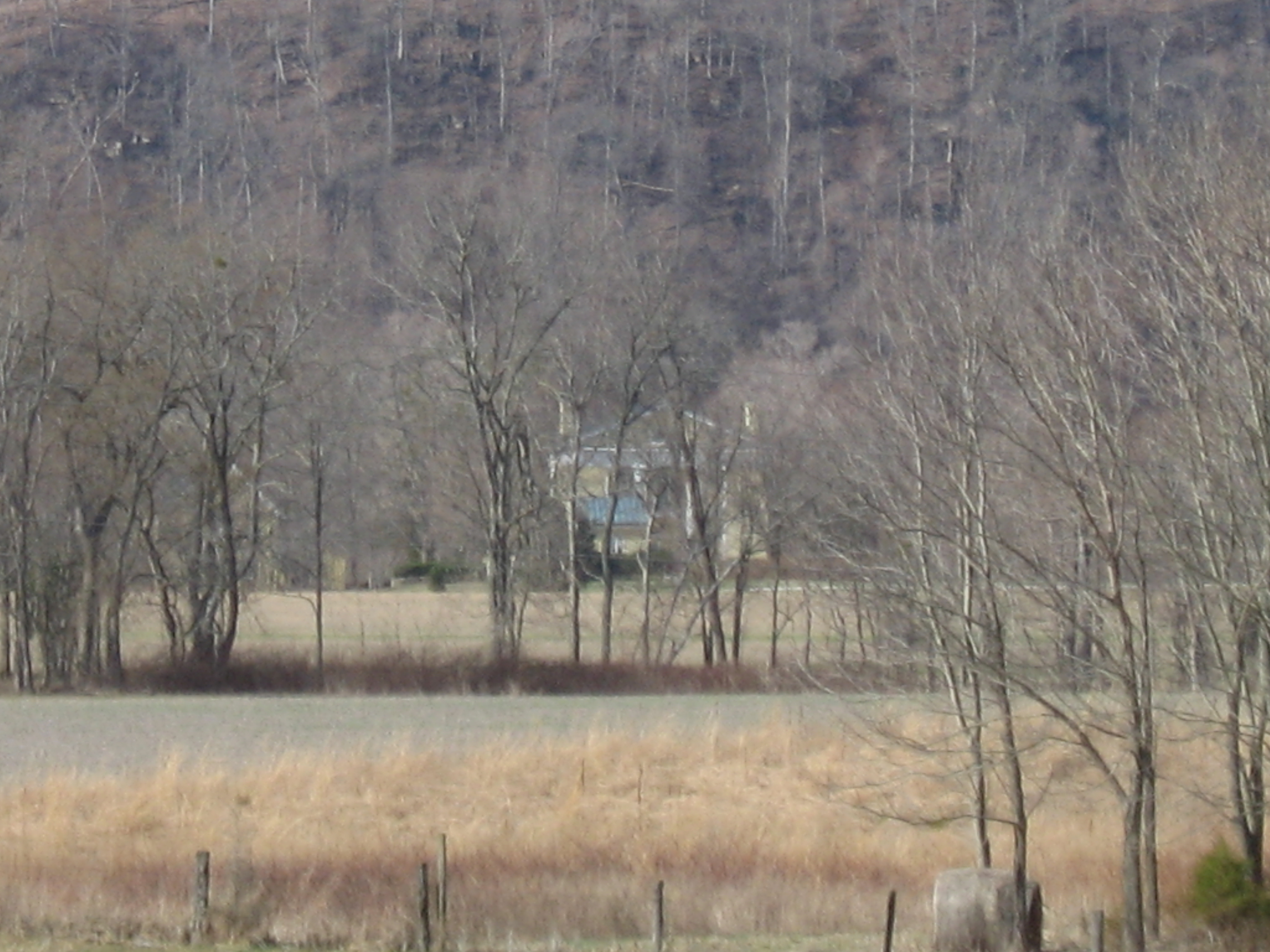
- Distant view of the house

- Location within Harrison County, Indiana Location within Indiana Location within the United States
- Location: South of Laconia on Kintner Bottoms Rd., Boone Township, Harrison County, Indiana
- Coordinates: 37°58′26.99″N 86°3′34.01″W
- Area: less than one acre
- Built: 1837
- Architectural style: Classical Revival
- NRHP reference No.: 80000039
- Added to NRHP: November 28, 1980

The Kintner–Withers House, also known as Cedar Farm, is on the National Register of Historic Places, south of Laconia, Indiana, along the Ohio River in Boone Township, Harrison County, Indiana. Jacob Kintner, aided by his wife Elizabeth, built the structure in 1837. It is one of only 2 "antebellum plantation-style" complexes known to remain in Indiana, comprised originally on 600 acres (240 ha) of land (this eventually peaked at 1000 acres). It is believed that Kintner was inspired to build this after sailing on the Mississippi River to New Orleans.

Besides the Classic-Revival mail house with four front and two rear Roman Doric columns 2'9" in diameter, the property also has barns for livestock and tobacco, a cookhouse, icehouse, underground milkhouse, schoolhouse (built 1850), and tenant housing for sharecroppers. There were two landings onto the Ohio River.

The Ohio River flood of 1937 reached the ceiling of the ground floor. The next highest flood of the area, in 1997, came within 30 feet (9.1 m) of the building.

Preservationists William and Gayle Cook bought the farm from Kintner's descendants in 1984 after the last full-time resident of the house, Julia Kintner Withers, the granddaughter of Jacob Kintner, died in 1980 at the age of 92. Later that year they hired Pritchett Brothers Inc. of Bedford, Indiana to begin restoration of the farm. The house is painted light yellow with white trim and green shutters based on an 1898 painting by Indianapolis artist William Forsyth. In 2003 the smokehouse was rebuilt.

It was added to the National Register of Historic Places in 1980.

== See also ==
- Kintner House Hotel
- Kintner-McGrain House
