= Boone Township, Harrison County, Indiana =

Boone Township
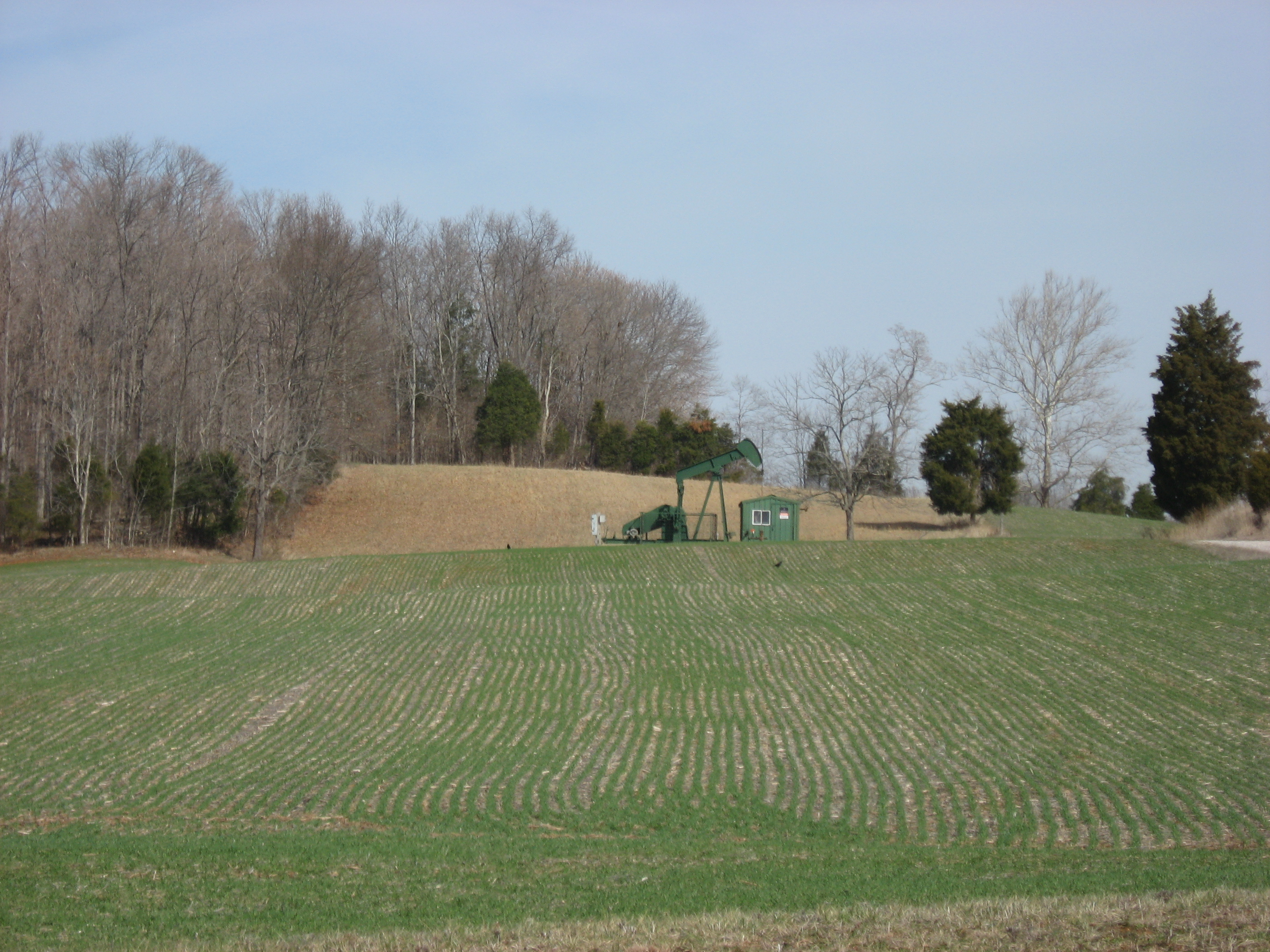
- Countryside in the township's northwest

- Location in Harrison County
- Coordinates: 38°02′57″N 86°04′26″W
- Country: United States
- State: Indiana
- County: Harrison

Government
  - Type: Indiana township

Area
  - Total: 47.65 sq mi (123.4 km^{2})
  - Land: 47.31 sq mi (122.5 km^{2})
  - Water: 0.34 sq mi (0.88 km^{2}) 0.71%
- Elevation: 673 ft (205 m)

Population (2020)
  - Total: 1,308
  - Density: 27.65/sq mi (10.67/km^{2})
- GNIS feature ID: 0453128

Boone Township is one of 12 townships in Harrison County, Indiana, United States. As of the 2020 census, its population was 1,308 and it contained 593 housing units.

Historical population
Census	Pop.	Note	%±
1890	1,961		—
1900	1,901		−3.1%
1910	1,589		−16.4%
1920	1,453		−8.6%
1930	1,350		−7.1%
1940	1,052		−22.1%
1950	1,106		5.1%
1960	1,077		−2.6%
1970	985		−8.5%
1980	1,065		8.1%
1990	1,161		9.0%
2000	1,217		4.8%
2010	1,391		14.3%
2020	1,308		−6.0%
Source: US Decennial Census

== History ==
Boone Township is named after Squire Boone who settled in the township in 1806. He died there in 1815 and is buried in the nearby Squire Boone Caverns. Boone built the first Baptist church in Indiana in the Boone Township in 1813. The church is called Old Goshen Church and has been reconstructed.

Kintner-Withers House was added to the National Register of Historic Places in 1980.

== Geography ==
According to the 2010 census, the township has a total area of 47.65 square miles (123.4 km^{2}), of which 47.31 square miles (122.5 km^{2}) (or 99.29%) is land and 0.34 square miles (0.88 km^{2}) (or 0.71%) is water. The streams of Big Run, Mays Branch and West Branch Mosquito Creek run through this township.

=== Cities and towns ===
- Laconia

=== Unincorporated towns ===
- Cedar Farm Landing
- Gurley Landing
- Rehoboth

(This list is based on USGS data and may include former settlements.)

=== Education ===
The children of Boone Township attend South Central school which is part of the South Harrison School District.

=== Adjacent townships ===
- Webster Township (north)
- Posey Township (northeast)
- Taylor Township (east)
- Heth Township (west)
- Harrison Township (northwest)

=== Cemeteries ===
The township contains 43 documented cemeteries: Able, Barger, Becky Brown Family Plot, Beswick/Radmacher's, Brown Family Cemetery (aka Old Stephen's), Chaffin, Cole, Collen's Chapel, Cotner, Crosier, Dodd/Kings, Dunkard, Eckart, Ellis, Entrician/Endrocrane, Ferree/May, Grey, Guest, John Brown Cemetery, Kinzer/Lightner, Laconia Methodist (Bethel), Lane, Lewis, Madden, Marsh Burying Ground, McIntire (Evan's), Memorial Baptist/Presbyterian, Nancy Brown Plot, Old Goshen, Payton, Philip Rupp's Grave, Phillips Cemetery, Reed, Rehobeth, Ridley, Sacred Heart of Mary Catholic Cemetery, Sands, Stallings, Stephens, Union Chapel, unnamed Boone and Zimmerman family cemetery.

=== Major highways ===
- Indiana State Road 11
- Indiana State Road 337
