= Corydon Junction, Indiana =

Unincorporated community in Indiana, United States

Coordinates: 38.30340°N 86.10025°W

Corydon Junction is an unincorporated community in Harrison County, Indiana, in the United States.

== History ==
Corydon Junction was founded in 1833. It was a depot on the Louisville, New Albany and Corydon Railroad.
