= Kintner House Hotel =

- U.S. National Register of Historic Places
- U.S. Historic district – Contributing property
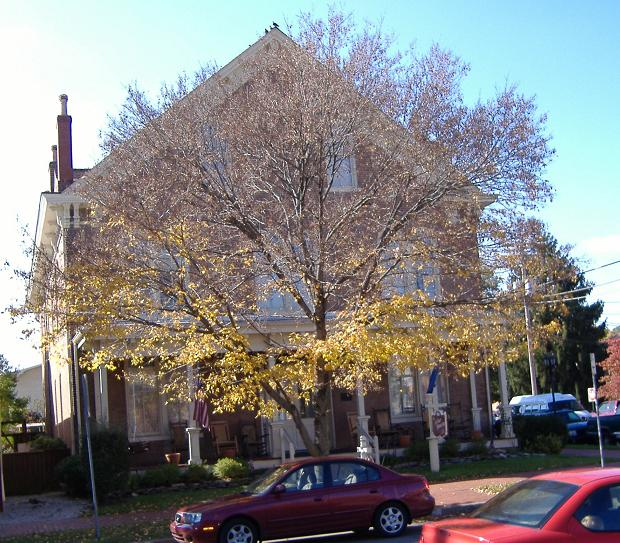

- Location within Indiana
- Location: 201 S. Capital, Corydon, Indiana
- Coordinates: 38°12′37.29″N 86°7′34.33″W
- Area: <1 acre
- Built: 1873
- Architectural style: Italianate
- NRHP reference No.: 87000099
- Added to NRHP: January 12, 1987

The Kintner House Hotel is a historic bed and breakfast, in the Corydon Historic District in Corydon, Indiana. The present building was built in 1873, and is a 2 1/2-story, Italianate style brick building. The original Kintner House, two blocks away, was where John Hunt Morgan learned that Robert E. Lee lost at the Battle of Gettysburg. The Kintner House remained a hotel until 1920 and was used as offices until 1986. It was extensively restored and opened as a bed and breakfast in 1987.

It was added to the National Register of Historic Places in 1987.

== See also ==
- Kintner-McGrain House
- Kintner-Withers House
