= Kintner-McGrain House =

Historic house in Indiana, United States

- U.S. National Register of Historic Places
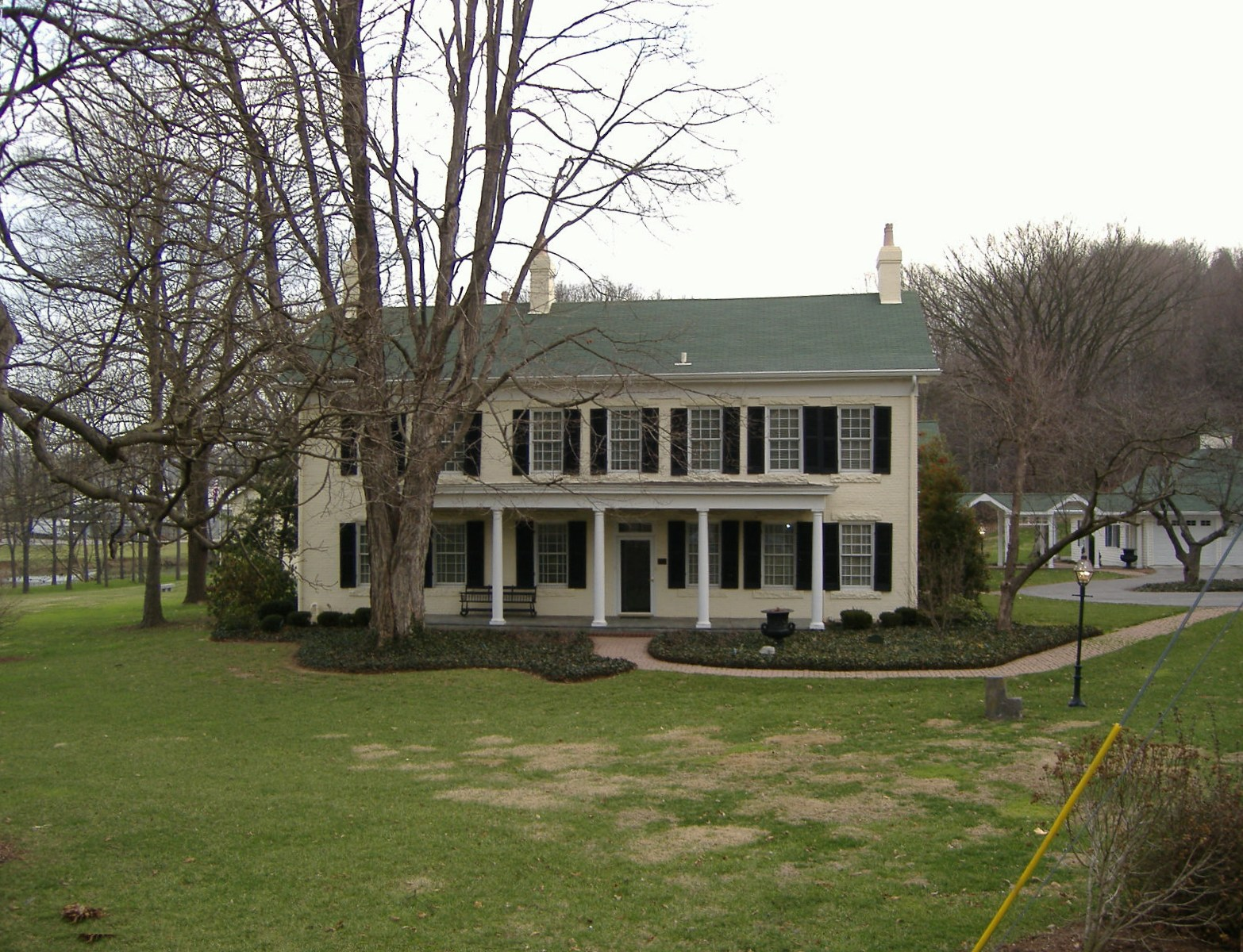

- Location within Harrison County, Indiana Location within Indiana Location within the United States
- Location: 740 N. Capital Ave., Corydon, Indiana
- Coordinates: 38°13′5″N 86°7′33″W
- Area: 2.2 acres (0.89 ha)
- Built: 1808
- Architect: Jacob Kintner
- Architectural style: Federal
- NRHP reference No.: 83000032
- Added to NRHP: August 3, 1983

The Kintner-Mcgrain House, also known as Cedar Glade, is on the National Register of Historic Places, located north of downtown Corydon, Indiana. It attained the "Cedar Glade" name due to the giant red cedars Jacob Kintner, the builder, planted in front of the house. It was built in 1808 by Jacob Kintner and his wife Agnes Crist, the same year Corydon became a town. Cedar Glade had Corydon's first water works, with Mr. Kintner laying pipe from springs behind the home to supply ever-flowing clear and cool spring water to the house, barns and his tan yard across the road. Few homes anywhere in those early days would have had such a system. It has been owned by three different families: Kintners (1808), McGrains(1849), and Bennetts (1998). It is the second-oldest building in Harrison County, Indiana. It was built in 1808, and is a Late Federal/Early Republic Style, L-shaped, brick dwelling. One of Jacob Kintner's sons, Peter Shipley Kintner, often traveled abroad. After Jacob Kintner's death, Peter S. Kintner "the world traveler" traded Cedar Glade in 1849 to Thomas McGrain Sr. for a business building on Main Street in Louisville. McGrain moved from Louisville to Corydon and young Peter Kintner moved to Paris, France. When Peter died, his remains were shipped back to Corydon and he was buried in the family plot on Cedar Hill. Of course, this was before the age of refrigeration and embalming, and Peter's body was shipped across the Atlantic in alcohol. During John Hunt Morgan's raid in 1863, noncombatants took refuge in the house. Ironically, several cannonballs landed in the front yard, none hit the house. Until 1946 it was a working farm.

It was added to the National Register of Historic Places in 1983.

== See also ==
- Kintner House Hotel
- Kintner-Withers House
