= Corydon, Indiana =

Town in Harrison County Indiana

- Town
- Town of Corydon
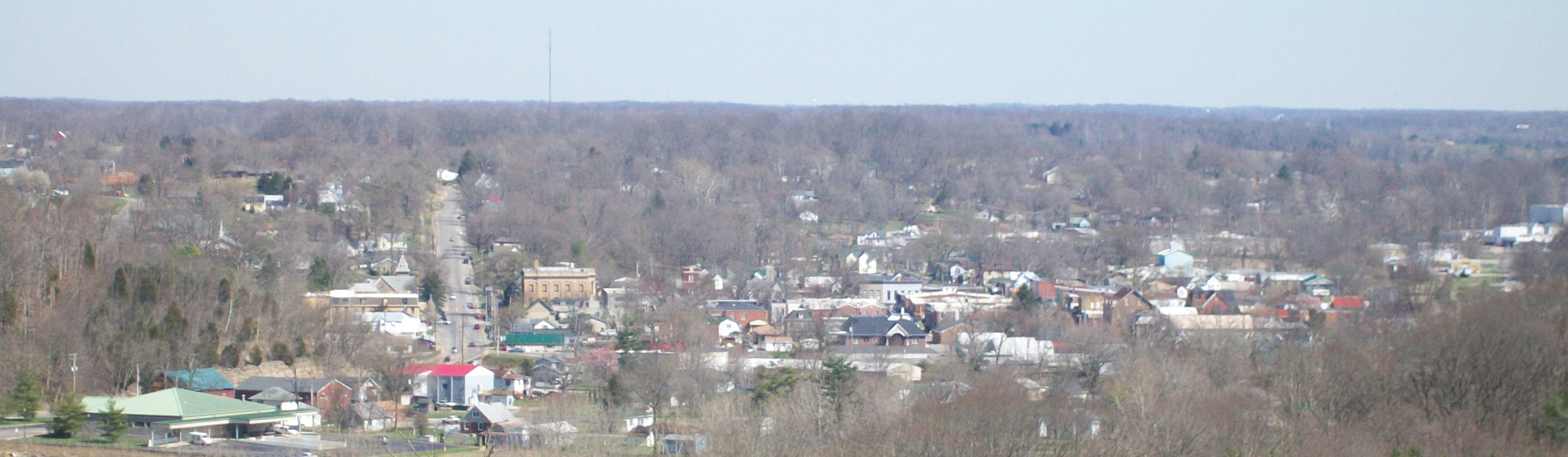
- Downtown Corydon viewed from the Pilot Knob in the Hayswood Nature Reserve

- Flag Logo

- Location of Corydon in Harrison County, Indiana.
- Coordinates: 38°12′38″N 86°07′35″W
- Country: United States
- State: Indiana
- County: Harrison
- Township: Harrison

Area
  - Total: 1.64 sq mi (4.24 km^{2})
  - Land: 1.64 sq mi (4.24 km^{2})
  - Water: 0 sq mi (0.00 km^{2})
- Elevation: 568 ft (173 m)

Population (2020)
  - Total: 3,153
  - Density: 1,926.7/sq mi (743.92/km^{2})
- Time zone: UTC-5 (EST)
  - Summer (DST): UTC-4 (EDT)
- ZIP code: 47112
- Area code: 812
- FIPS code: 18-15256
- GNIS feature ID: 2396664
- Website: townofcorydon.com

Corydon is a town in Harrison Township and the county seat of Harrison County, Indiana, located north of the Ohio River in the extreme southern part of the US state. Corydon was founded in 1808 and served as the capital of the Indiana Territory from 1813 to 1816. It was the site of Indiana's first constitutional convention, which was held June 10–29, 1816. Forty-three delegates convened to consider statehood for Indiana and drafted its first state constitution. Under Article XI, Section 11, of the Indiana 1816 constitution, Corydon was designated as the capital of the state, which it remained until 1825, when the seat of state government was moved to Indianapolis. In 1863, during the American Civil War, Corydon was the site of the Battle of Corydon, the only official pitched battle waged in Indiana during the war. More recently, the town's numerous historic sites have helped it become a tourist destination. A portion of its downtown area is listed in the National Register of Historic Places as the Corydon Historic District. As of the 2020 census, Corydon had a population of 3,153.

== History ==
=== Early settlement ===
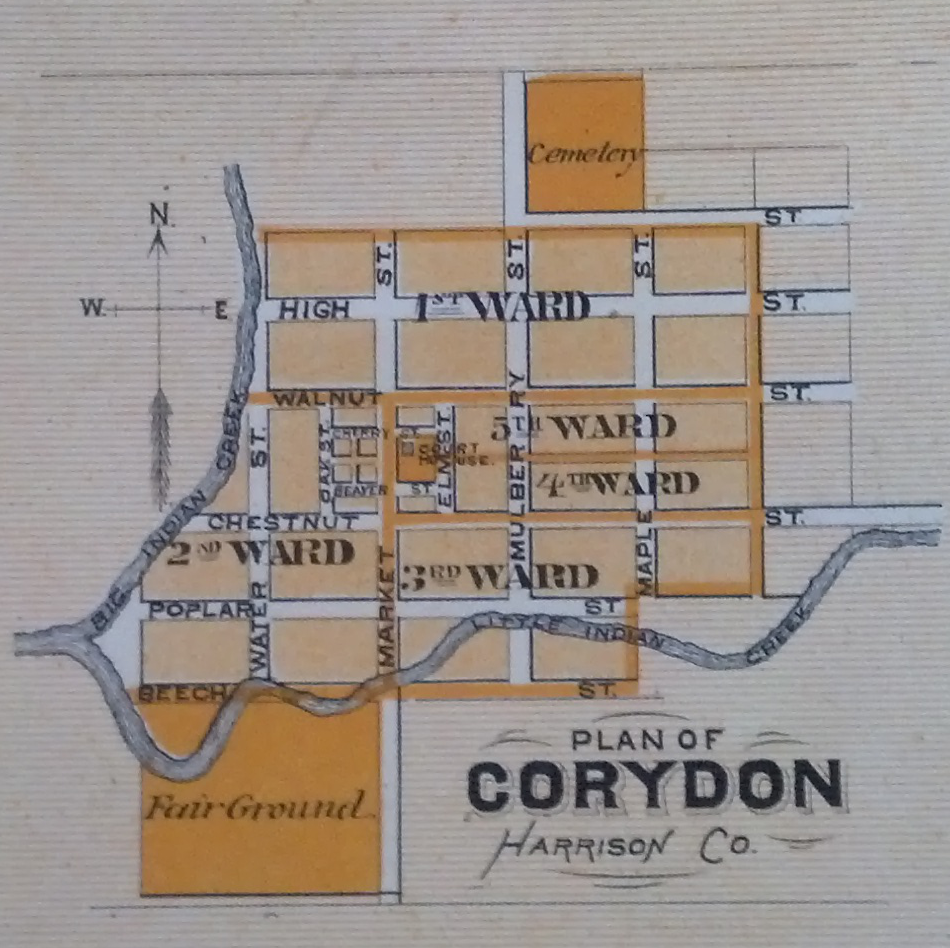
Map of Corydon from 1876 atlas

During the American Revolution, George Rogers Clark captured the surrounding area of what became the town of Corydon from the British, bringing it under the control of the fledgling United States government. The first American settlers entered Harrison County in 1792 and included the families of Harvey Heth and Squire Boone, who settled south of Corydon, and Dennis Pennington and the Harbisons, who settled east of Corydon. The region was in the midst of the Northwest Indian War during that period and the families were forced by Native Americans to leave the region and return to Kentucky. The families returned to the area in 1800 following the creation of the Indiana territory.

The territorial government completed the land survey of what would become Corydon in 1807, and the first official land purchases occurred in April of that year. In 1803, Edward Smith and his family became the first Americans to settle in what would become Corydon. Following the completion of the 1807 land survey, he purchased the tract of land he had already been living on; at that time his family were the only recorded inhabitants of the future site of the town. He purchased land at the edge of a fertile valley near a large spring, which is the site of the present-day Harrison County fairgrounds. William Henry Harrison, the first governor of the Indiana Territory and a future president of the United States, often stopped to rest at the Smith's home while travelling to and from Vincennes, the territorial capital.

In 1804 Harrison purchased a tract of land where Big Indian Creek and Little Indian Creek join to become Indian Creek and decided to build a town on the site. Harrison built a two-story home in the town, but sold it in 1809. The town gets its name from "The Pastoral Elegy", a hymn that celebrates the death of a shepherd named Corydon. Tradition says that Harrison asked Edward Smith's daughter, Jenny, to name the town and she chose the name from Harrison's favorite hymn, "The Pastoral Elegy".

Harrison sold the town site to Harvey Heth in 1807. Corydon's official founding date of 1808 commemorates the year when Heth, a U.S. government surveyor and landowner, platted the town. Heth donated the town square for public use and sold individual lots to settlers and the territorial government. When Harrison County was established in 1808, Corydon became its county seat of government. The town originally consisted of 185 lots. In 1809 Corydon was connected by road to Doup's Ferry, 15 miles (24 km) to the south at Mauck's Port, providing access to the Ohio River for trade. The first county courthouse was built at the northwest corner of the town at the summit of High Street.

Corydon quickly grew into one of the most important early settlements in Indiana, in large part due to the political successes of its early inhabitants and as one of the main stops on the only land route to the territorial capital of Vincennes. During the War of 1812, Corydon sent a mounted militia company nicknamed the Yellow Jackets to support the territorial army. The company fought in the Battle of Tippecanoe, where it suffered more casualties than any other unit.

=== Territorial capital (1813–1816) ===
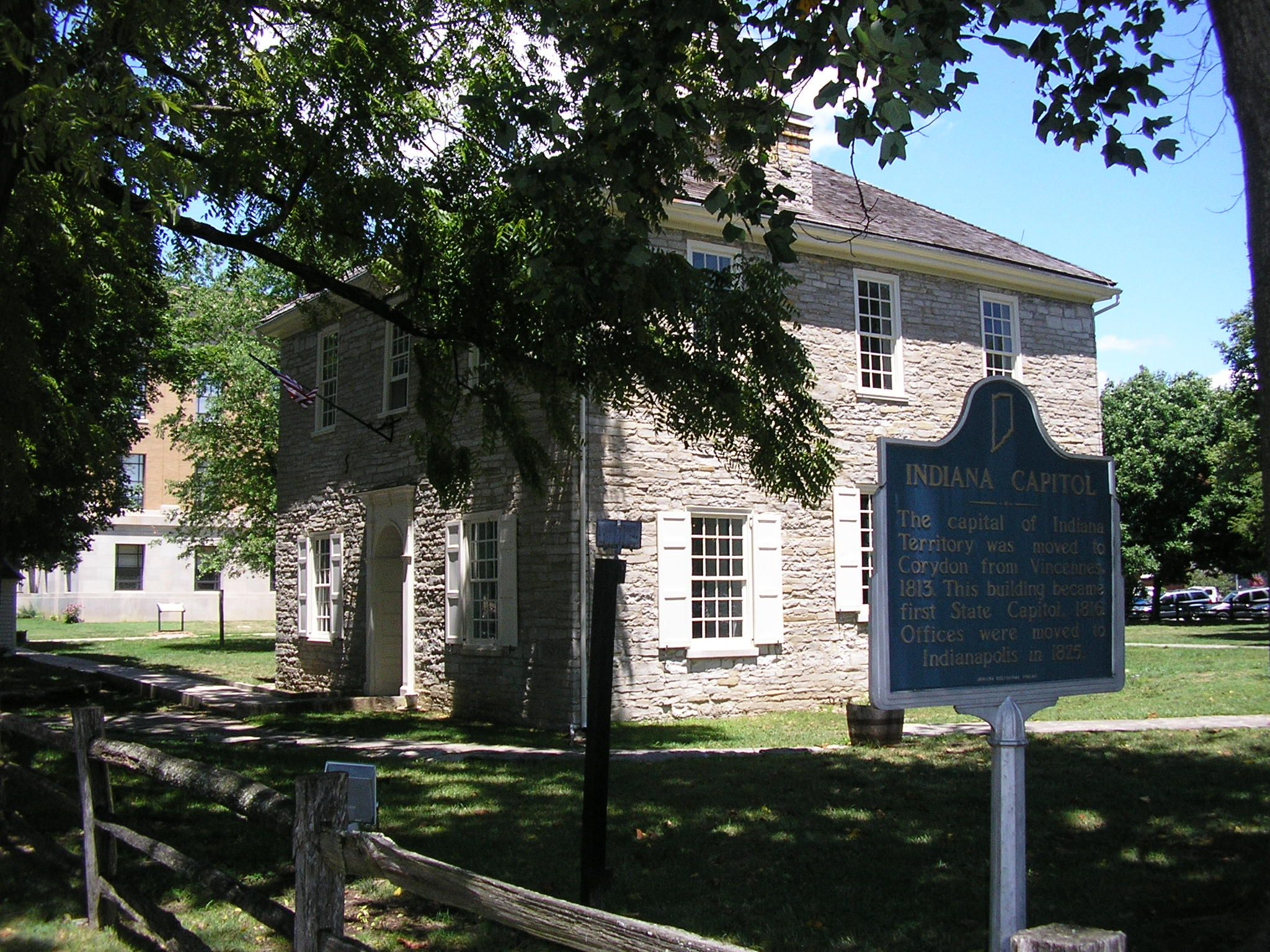
Old Capitol Building in downtown Corydon

Corydon became the second capital of the Indiana Territory on May 1, 1813, when it was relocated from Vincennes in Knox County. Opponents of William Henry Harrison, the former territorial governor, wanted to move the capital away from his political stronghold in Knox County. Supporters of the move felt that relocation of the territorial capital to the east would provide a more centralized location for its citizens, especially after its western portion was reorganized to form the Illinois Territory in 1809.

Corydon competed with Charlestown, Clarksville, Lawrenceburg, Madison, and Jeffersonville to become the new territorial capital. Dennis Pennington, a Harrison County representative and the speaker of the territorial legislature's lower house, helped secure the town's selection during the 1813 session of the Indiana Territory's general assembly. Pennington pointed out that Corydon would be an ideal location. The Harrison County court had approved a design for a new county courthouse on Corydon's public square in 1811 and it could be used as an assembly building for the territorial legislature. Pennington supervised construction of the limestone courthouse, which was nearly completed when Indiana's first state legislature convened at Corydon in 1816. Prior to 1816, the territorial legislature met in the original county courthouse on High Street.

Paul and Susannah Mitchem became Quakers and immigrated to Harrison County from North Carolina in 1814, bringing with them 107 slaves whom they freed after arriving. Most of the former slaves then settled around the town of Corydon. Although some of the former slaves left, the group became one of the largest communities of free blacks in the state.

=== Constitutional convention, 1816 ===
On April 19, 1816, President James Madison signed an Enabling Act that provided for the election of delegates to a convention at Corydon to consider statehood for Indiana. Forty-three delegates, including five men from Harrison County, convened June 10–29, 1816, to draft Indiana's first state constitution. The preamble of the constitution acknowledges the site of the historic gathering: "We the Representatives of the people of the Territory of Indiana, in Convention met, at Corydon, on Monday the tenth day of June in the year of our Lord eighteen hundred and sixteen,..."

The delegates met in an unfinished log cabin near the Harrison County courthouse, which had not yet been completed; due to cramped conditions and the summer heat, the men often sought refuge outside under a giant elm tree, later named the Constitution Elm. Although the tree was lost to Dutch Elm Disease in 1825, a portion of its trunk has been preserved, surrounded by a sandstone memorial built by the WPA during the Great Depression in the 1930s. The delegates completed their work in nineteen days, adjourning on June 29, 1816, when the newly signed state constitution went into effect. As outlined in Article XI, Section 11, of the constitution of 1816: "Corydon, in Harrison County shall be the seat of Government of the state of Indiana, until the year eighteen hundred and twenty-five, and until removed by law."

Corydon's selection as the capital led to rapid growth of the town and a housing shortage. There were only three taverns for visitor lodging in 1813. A fourth and much larger tavern, the Kintner House Tavern, opened in 1819. Many officials, including three successive Governors, and their staff moved to Corydon and built large homes in the town. The town hosted meetings from national officials, including an 1819 visit by United States President James Monroe and Andrew Jackson.

=== State capital (1816–1825) ===
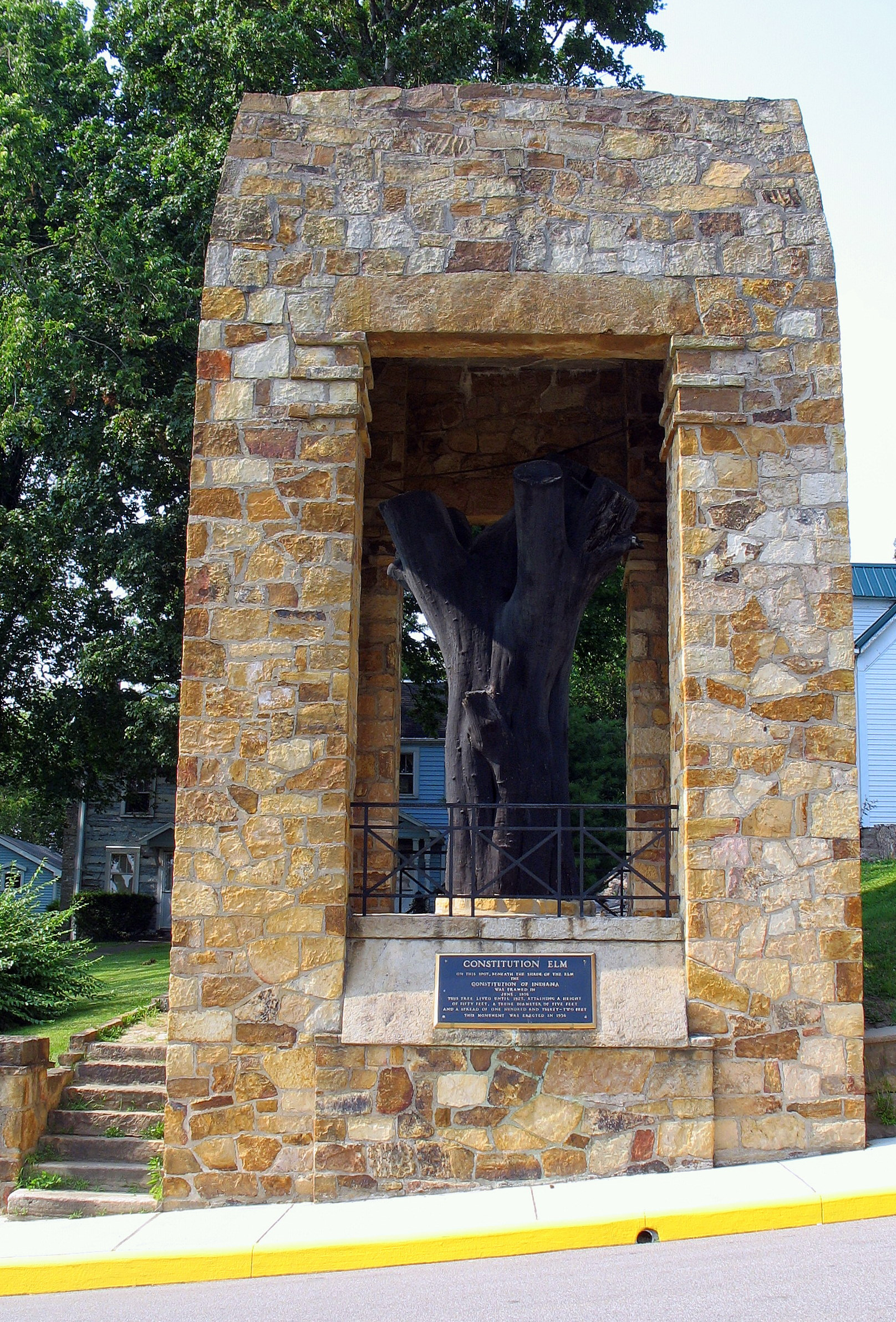
The Constitution Elm as seen in the summer of 2006

On November 4, 1816, the Indiana General Assembly met for the first time at Corydon under the new constitution and state government. President James Madison signed the congressional resolution admitting Indiana as the nineteenth state in the Union on December 11, 1816, and Corydon began a new era as the first state capital of Indiana.

The Harrison County courthouse, now known as the Old Capitol, served as Indiana's first state capitol building. It housed state government offices from 1816 until 1825. Several other historic structures in Corydon date from the early statehood era, including the Governor's Mansion and the Old Treasury Building (Indiana's first state office building), which were built in 1817, and the Colonel Thomas Lloyd Posey home, among others. Corydon's Grand Masonic Lodge, the first in the state, was built in 1819.

During the years Corydon served as a territorial and state capital, it was home to a number of politicians; notable residents during this time included Davis Floyd, a prominent local politician; two governors of Indiana, Jonathan Jennings and Ratliff Boon (the state's first and second governors, respectively); Dennis Pennington, the first Speaker of the Indiana Senate; and William Hendricks, Indiana's first U. S. Representative, its third governor, and a U.S. Senator.

The state constitution's provision making Corydon the seat of state government was not a popular one, especially among the citizens of rival towns. Others expressed concern that the town's geographic location in the extreme southern part of Indiana would become inconvenient as the state's population center shifted northward; however, Dennis Pennington and other Harrison County representatives to the Indiana General Assembly successfully resisted attempts to move the seat of government from Corydon until 1825. Governor Hendricks signed a legislative bill in 1824 to move the state capital to Indianapolis, effective January 10, 1825.

=== Post-capital period ===
After the seat of state government moved to Indianapolis in 1825, Corydon continued its role as the seat of county government and a market town for the surrounding agricultural area. In 1826 a new County Clerk's office was constructed which remained the principal county office until 1848. During the early days of the town, Big Indian Creek and Little Indian Creek were both used for drinking water, bathing, and sewage, which resulted in a cholera outbreak in 1832. Following the outbreak, the town only used the creeks for bathing and multiple wells were dug for drinking water. In 1836, the town began spreading gravel on the roads, which had been dirt roads before.

During 1848, a new two-story federal style brick office building was constructed on the east side of the county courthouse. This second office building remained in use until 1881. On September 11–14, 1860, the first annual county fair was held on Corydon's 36-acre (15 ha) fairgrounds. It has been an annual event since 1860, making it the longest consecutive-running annual county fair in the state. The fairgrounds, established in the southwest corner of town, are bordered on the south and west by a large ridge that served as a natural grandstand until the first grandstand was built, circa 1910.

=== Battle of Corydon (1863) ===
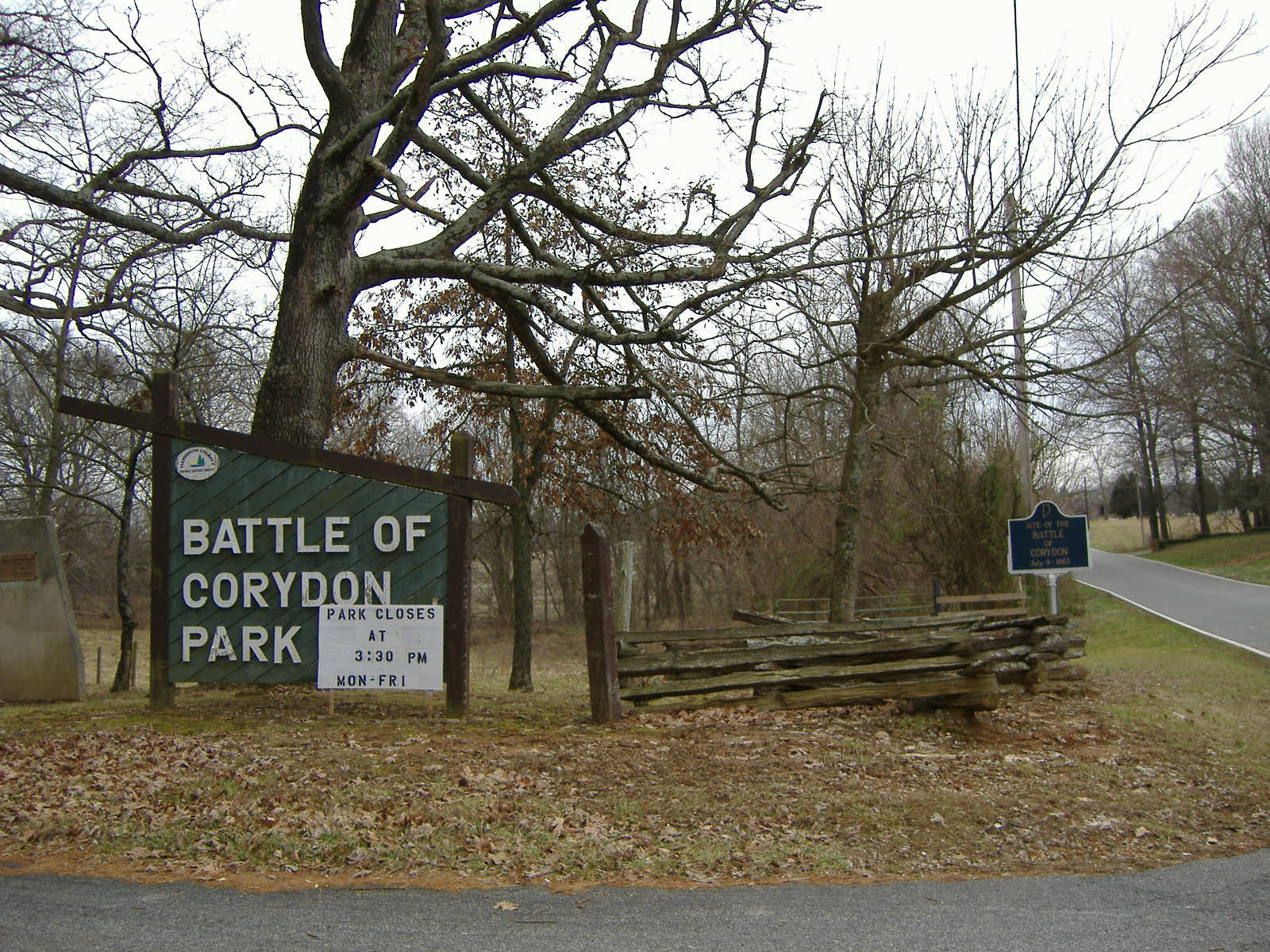
Battle of Corydon Memorial Park

During the Civil War, Corydon was the site of the only "official pitched battle" fought in Indiana. On July 9, 1863, Confederate brigadier general John Hunt Morgan's cavalry of more than 2,000 men crossed the Ohio River into Indiana to begin what is known as "Morgan's Raid". The Confederate troops opposed about 450 members of a hastily assembled home guard at the Battle of Corydon outside of town, but the Union forces were quickly defeated and the town surrendered.

Corydon was sacked in retaliation for Union looting in Kentucky, the town's treasury of $690 was seized, and the inmates of the local jail were released. General Morgan demanded $600 to $700 in ransom from each mill and shop owner to keep their buildings from being burned. Tradition says one Corydon miller overpaid by $200; Morgan promptly returned it to him.

=== Post-Civil War Period ===
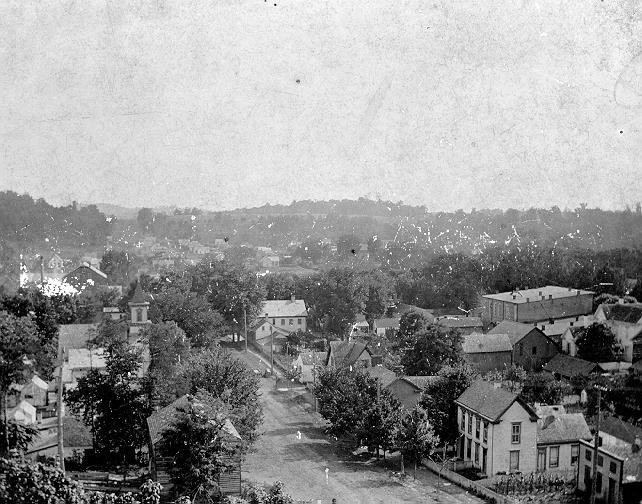
Corydon in 1896, looking southward from Walnut Street

In 1871 local journalists began to bring the condition of the first Indiana statehouse to public attention. The building had become filthy and infested with fleas and other pests such that many people refused to enter it. Their campaign proved successful, and in 1873 the building was given a major renovation. The walls and ceilings were replastered, a new staircase and furnishings were installed, and the building was thoroughly cleaned.

In 1881 the county began construction of its third office building after demolishing the prior building. The building was completed in June 1882 and remained in use until 1929. The state of Indiana purchased the 1816 courthouse to preserve as a state historic site following the move. Beginning in 1882, the Louisville, New Albany and Corydon Railroad, an 8-mile (13 km) spur of the Southern Railway, connected Corydon to other towns in the region. Southern Railroad's main line ran across northern Harrison County at Crandall, and remained open to passenger traffic until 1996. As of 2008, the line was owned by Lucas Oil. A major fire broke out in 1871, in which the Kintner House Tavern was destroyed, along with the entire block from Cherry to Beaver Streets. The county jail also burned in the blaze. A second major fire broke out in Corydon on April 20, 1883, in the west end of Corydon; seven businesses, stables, and multiple homes were destroyed. The fire would have spread further, but it slowed as it spread through a lumber yard containing only freshly cut timber that did not burn easily. This allowed the townspeople to get the upper hand and extinguish the fire, but most of the western portion of the town was burned. It was not until 1922 that all the lots were rebuilt.

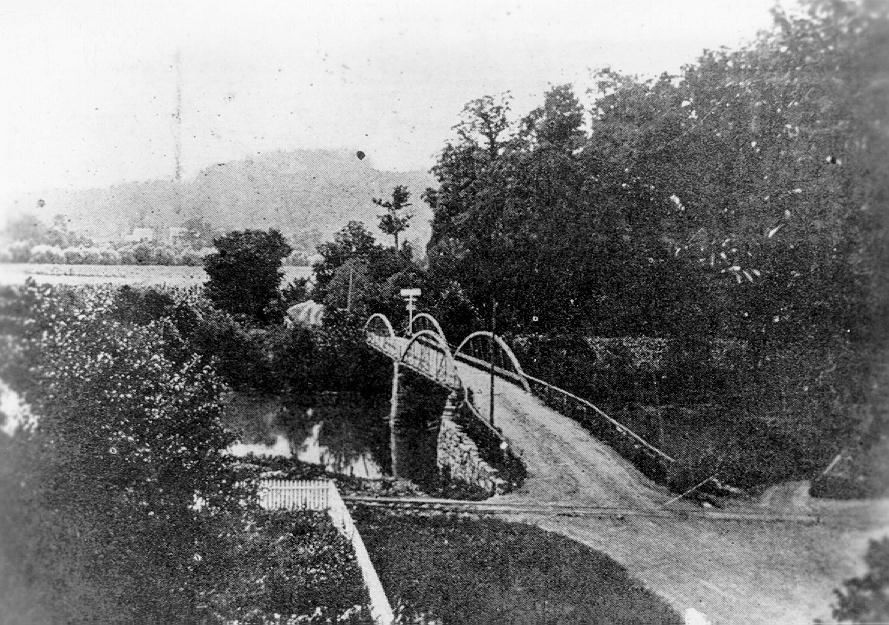
Corydon's Old West Bridge in 1889

In 1889 an attempted murder in Corydon resulted in a lynching. A mob of 150 mounted men, led by twenty masked Indiana white cap vigilantes, arrived at the county jail and demanded the release into their custody of two men (James Devin and Charles Tennyson) being held on charges of attempted murder. The leaders of the group demanded the keys to the jail, threatening to burn down the town if they were refused; after the sheriff refused to hand over the keys, the mob used hammers to knock down the jail doors and removed the two alleged assailants. The two men were dragged to the old Western Bridge, where they were hanged.

In 1917 the state of Indiana purchased the historic capitol building with the goal of restoring it. The Federal-style building opened as a state memorial in 1929–30; it is a part of the Corydon Capitol State Historic Site. The Harrison County government also used the former statehouse until a new, three-story county courthouse was completed in 1929, located on the north side of the original 1816 courthouse.

In 1960 a fire destroyed much of the Harrison County Fairgrounds, including its grandstand. A replacement grandstand was acquired from the minor league baseball team at Parkway Field in Louisville, Kentucky, is still in use.

In 1969 Corydon-born environmental historian Samuel P. Hays donated the 311-acre (126-hectare) Hayswood Nature Reserve to the county. Known as Hayswood Park, it is the county's second-largest nature reserve.

In 1973 a portion of Corydon's downtown area was listed on the National Register of Historic Places as the Corydon Historic District. Initially, the district included major sites dating from the period when Corydon was a territorial and state capital: the Old Capitol/Harrison County Courthouse building, the Governor Hendricks' Headquarters, Constitution Elm, the first state office building, the Kintner-McGrain House (Cedar Glade), and the Posey House, among others. In 1989 the historic district's boundary was increased to include The Kintner House Inn, among other commercial and residential buildings.

In 2008 Corydon celebrated its bicentennial anniversary with a year-long series of events that included the unveiling of a $200,000 bronze statue of Honorable Frank O'Bannon, the late governor of Indiana and a former citizen of Corydon.

A local attraction in Corydon was Butt Drugs, a drugstore known for its unique name, service, and merchandise. The store opened in 1952 and closed in 2023.

== Government ==
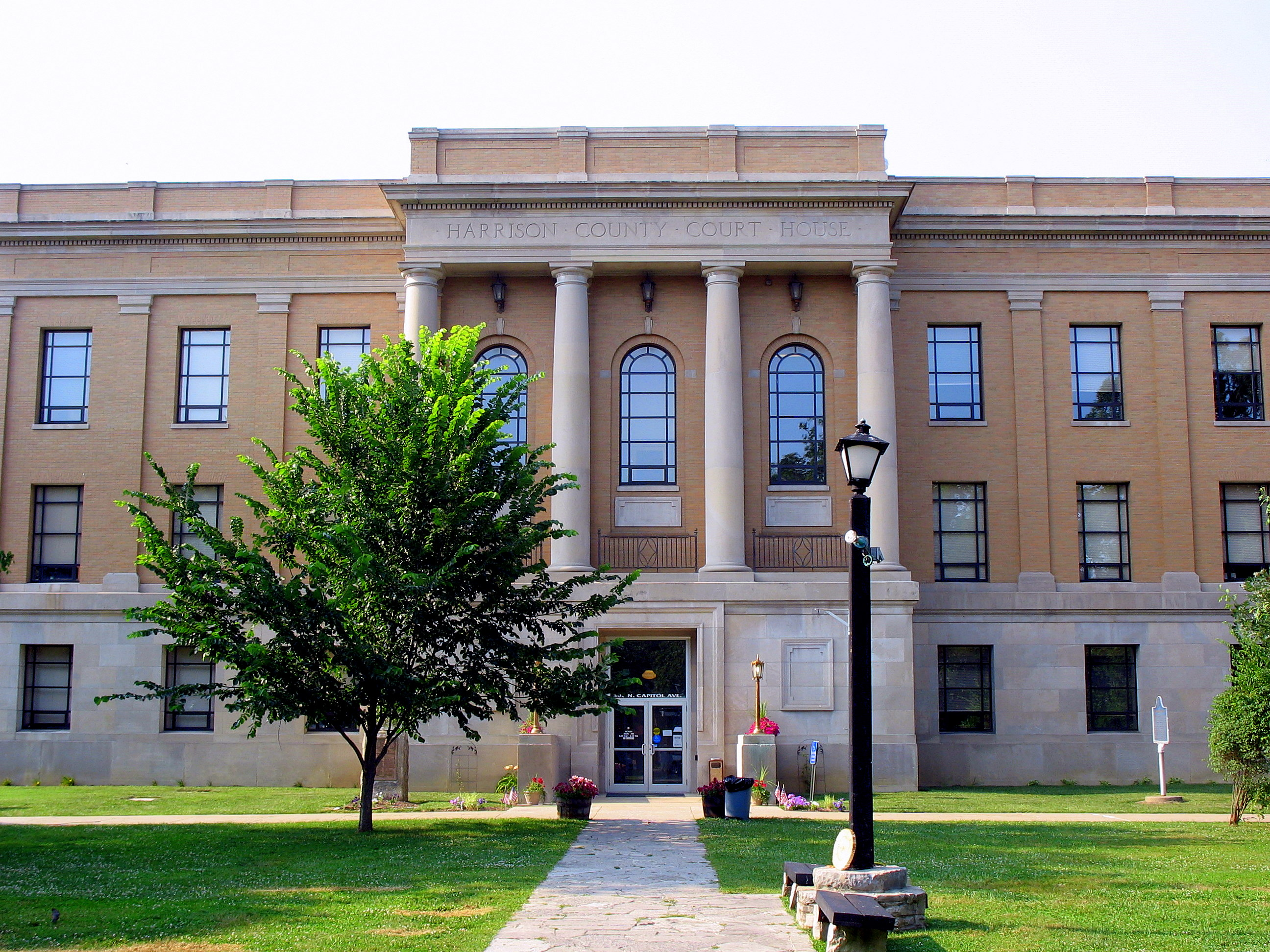
The Harrison County Court House in 2006

Corydon remains the county seat of Harrison County.

== Geography ==
Corydon is located near the center of Harrison County. Indiana State Road 62 passes through the town from east to west; Interstate 64 passes in the same direction less than a mile north of the town. The state capitol of Indianapolis is about 120 miles (190 km) to the north, and the city of Louisville, Kentucky is about 25 miles (40 km) to the east. Indian Creek passes through the town; the creek continues to the southwest where it empties into the Ohio River.

According to the 2010 census, Corydon has a total area of 1.65 square miles (4.27 km^{2}), all land.

== Demographics ==
Historical population
Census	Pop.	Note	%±
1850	462		—
1870	747		—
1880	763		2.1%
1890	880		15.3%
1900	1,610		83.0%
1910	1,703		5.8%
1920	1,785		4.8%
1930	2,009		12.5%
1940	1,865		−7.2%
1950	1,944		4.2%
1960	2,701		38.9%
1970	2,719		0.7%
1980	2,724		0.2%
1990	2,661		−2.3%
2000	2,715		2.0%
2010	3,122		15.0%
2020	3,153		1.0%
U.S. Decennial Census

=== 2020 census ===
As of the 2020 census, Corydon had a population of 3,153. The median age was 41.5 years. 21.4% of residents were under the age of 18 and 22.8% of residents were 65 years of age or older. For every 100 females there were 92.4 males, and for every 100 females age 18 and over there were 88.4 males age 18 and over.

100.0% of residents lived in urban areas, while 0.0% lived in rural areas.

There were 1,339 households in Corydon, of which 27.8% had children under the age of 18 living in them. Of all households, 36.1% were married-couple households, 23.1% were households with a male householder and no spouse or partner present, and 34.2% were households with a female householder and no spouse or partner present. About 38.8% of all households were made up of individuals and 17.4% had someone living alone who was 65 years of age or older.

There were 1,463 housing units, of which 8.5% were vacant. The homeowner vacancy rate was 2.0% and the rental vacancy rate was 7.4%.

Racial composition as of the 2020 census
Race	Number	Percent
White	2,827	89.7%
Black or African American	24	0.8%
American Indian and Alaska Native	23	0.7%
Asian	20	0.6%
Native Hawaiian and Other Pacific Islander	1	0.0%
Some other race	54	1.7%
Two or more races	204	6.5%
Hispanic or Latino (of any race)	133	4.2%

=== 2010 census ===
As of the census of 2010, there were 3,122 people, 1,341 households, and 716 families residing in the town. The population density was 1,892.1 inhabitants per square mile (730.5/km^{2}). There were 1,491 housing units at an average density of 903.6 per square mile (348.9/km^{2}). The racial makeup of the town was 96.7% White, 0.7% African American, 0.2% Native American, 0.2% Asian, 0.1% Pacific Islander, 0.9% from other races, and 1.2% from two or more races. Hispanic or Latino of any race were 2.6% of the population.

There were 1,341 households, of which 26.2% had children under the age of 18 living with them, 35.6% were married couples living together, 11.9% had a female householder with no husband present, 5.9% had a male householder with no wife present, and 46.6% were non-families. 41.6% of all households were made up of individuals, and 20.5% had someone living alone who was 65 years of age or older. The average household size was 2.14 and the average family size was 2.88.

The median age in the town was 40.8 years. 20.5% of residents were under the age of 18; 8.7% were between the ages of 18 and 24; 24.9% were from 25 to 44; 22.4% were from 45 to 64; and 23.4% were 65 years of age or older. The gender makeup of the town was 45.6% male and 54.4% female.

=== 2000 census ===
As of the census of 2000, there were 2,715 people, 1,171 households, and 674 families residing in the town. The population density was 1,708.1 inhabitants per square mile (659.5/km^{2}). There were 1,271 housing units at an average density of 799.6 per square mile (308.7/km^{2}). The racial makeup of the town was 97.27% White, 1.14% African American, 0.41% Native American, 0.11% Asian, 0.04% Pacific Islander, 0.85% from other races, and 0.18% from two or more races. Hispanic or Latino of any race were 1.88% of the population.

There were 1,171 households, out of which 25.1% had children under the age of 18 living with them, 40.4% were married couples living together, 13.3% had a female householder with no husband present, and 42.4% were non-families. 37.0% of all households were made up of individuals, and 19.0% had someone living alone who was 65 years of age or older. The average household size was 2.17 and the average family size was 2.81.

In the town, the population was spread out, with 20.1% under the age of 18, 10.2% from 18 to 24, 24.3% from 25 to 44, 20.7% from 45 to 64, and 24.8% who were 65 years of age or older. The median age was 41 years. For every 100 females, there were 83.1 males. For every 100 females age 18 and over, there were 80.2 males.

The median income for a household in the town was $33,823, and the median income for a family was $41,630. Males had a median income of $29,159 versus $21,699 for females. The per capita income for the town was $20,740. About 9.8% of families and 10.3% of the population were below the poverty line, including 15.2% of those under age 18 and 14.3% of those age 65 or over.

== Education ==
It is located within the South Harrison Community Schools school district.

Corydon has a public library, a branch of the Harrison County Public Library.

== Arts and culture ==
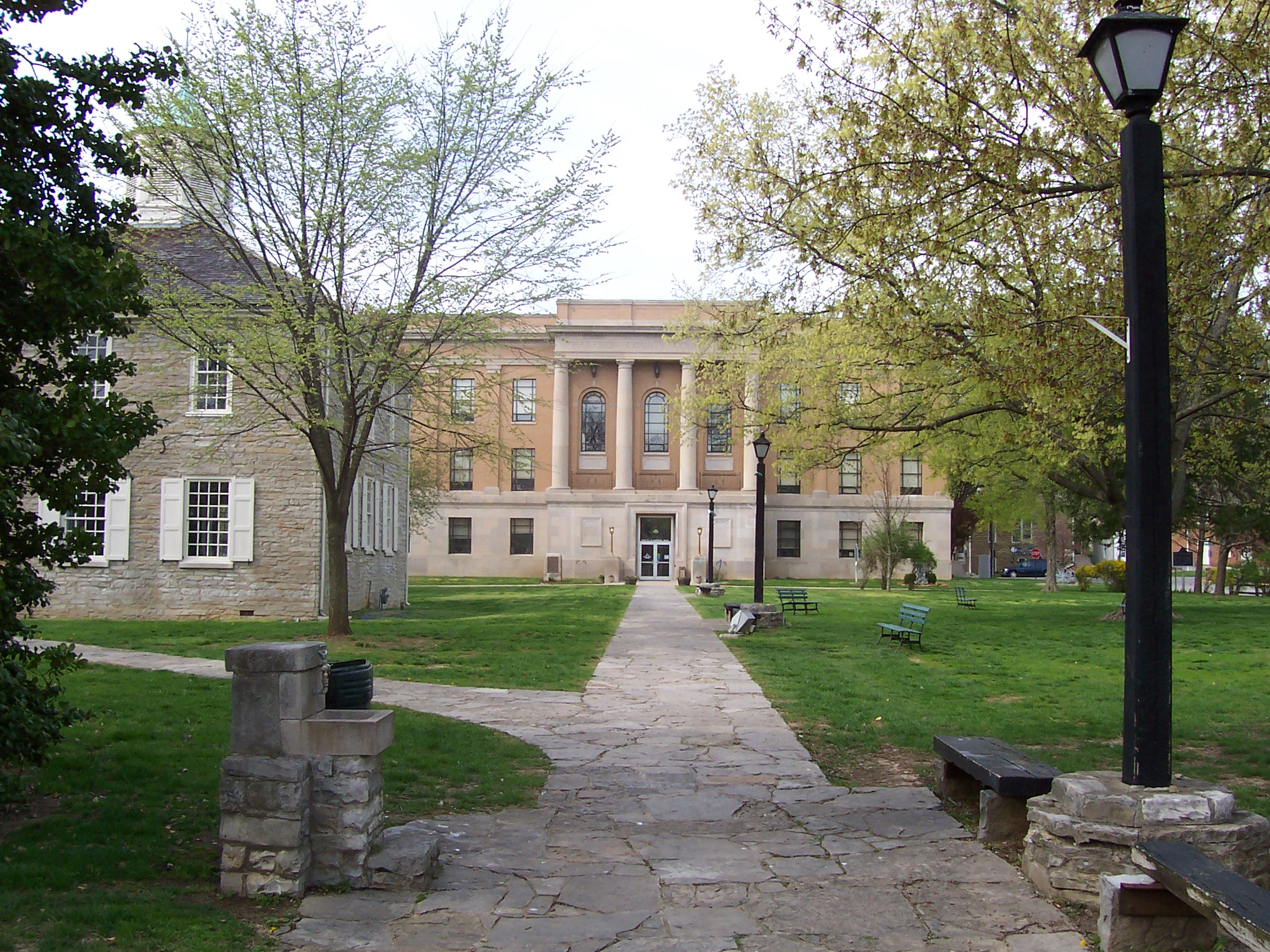
The historic town square

Because of its historic sites and the historic events that took place at Corydon, it has become a southern Indiana tourist destination. The town hosts weekly events from early spring until late fall, usually centered on its historic town square. Local events include an annual Halloween Parade, the Harrison County Fair, Friday night band concerts during the summer, and an annual reenactment of the Battle of Corydon, as well as country and bluegrass music performances. A weeklong county fair is held the third week of June at the Harrison County fairgrounds. It is one of Corydon's more popular events, with attendance usually exceeding 3,000 each night. The fair includes 4-H exhibits, a midway, demolition derbies, harness racing, and musical entertainment.

== Historic sites ==
- Old Capitol, Indiana's first state capitol building
- Governor Hendricks' Headquarters, a former residence of William Hendricks
- Constitution Elm Memorial
- Old Treasury Building, Indiana's first state office building
- Coburn-Porter Law Office, the former law office of Judge William Porter, who served as a speaker of the Indiana House of Representatives
- Posey House
- Battle of Corydon Memorial Park
- The Kintner House Inn
- Branham Tavern, built in 1800, a tavern began operating on the site in 1809.
- Westfall House, the town's oldest extant home
- Kintner-McGrain House (Cedar Glade)]
- Leora Brown School
- Heth House
- Cedar Hill Cemetery
- Flags Over Corydon
- Harrison County Fairgrounds

== Media ==
The Corydon Democrat, a weekly newspaper, has served the local area since 1856. It was the property of O'Bannon Publishing Company from 1907 to 2022. On June 30, 2022, O'Bannon Publishing sold the paper to Paxton Media Group.

== Transportation ==
Southern Indiana Transit System provides deviated fixed-route and demand-response bus service in the town.

The Louisville New Albany & Corydon Railway served Corydon. This short line never reached Louisville.

== Notable people ==
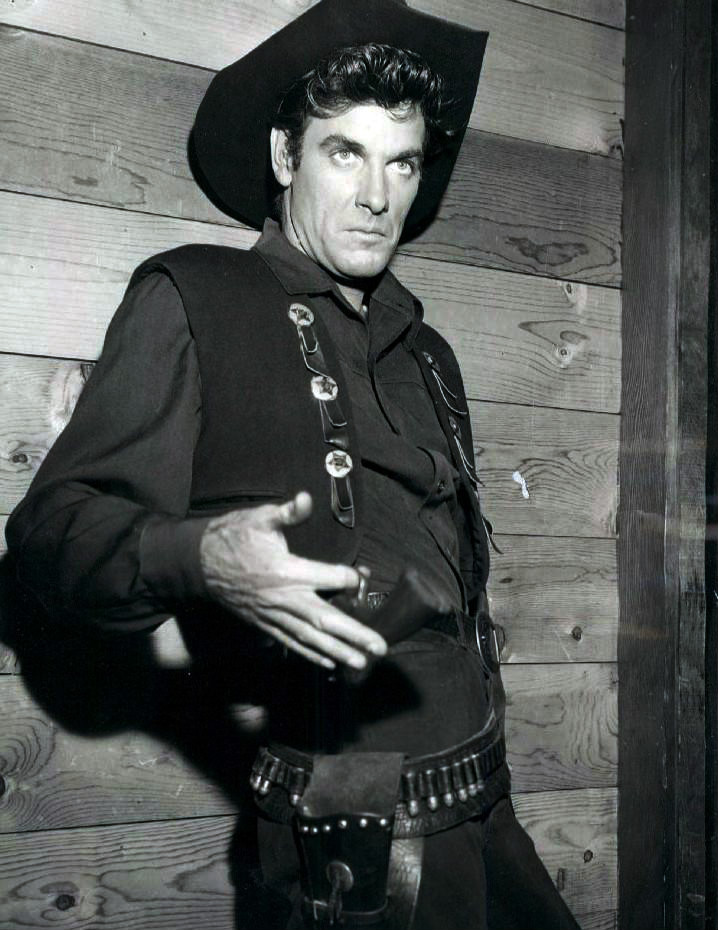
James Best

- James Best, actor known as Sheriff Rosco P. Coltrane on The Dukes of Hazzard
- Arville Funk, attorney and local historian
- Samuel P. Hays, academic and specialist on the U.S. conservation movement
- Foster C. LaHue, member of the Marine Corps who served in World War II, Korea and Vietnam
- Erin Moran, television actress known for Happy Days and Joanie Loves Chachi
- James N. Morgan, economist who launched the Panel Study of Income Dynamics in 1968
- Frank O'Bannon, 46th Lieutenant Governor of Indiana and 47th Governor of Indiana
- Robert Presley O'Bannon, member of the Indiana Senate
- Spier Spencer, sheriff who fought in the Battle of Tippecanoe and was killed in action on November 7, 1811
- William T. Zenor, attorney, judge, and member of the United States House of Representatives

== See also ==
- History of Indiana
