= Corps of Discovery =

Unit of the United States Army

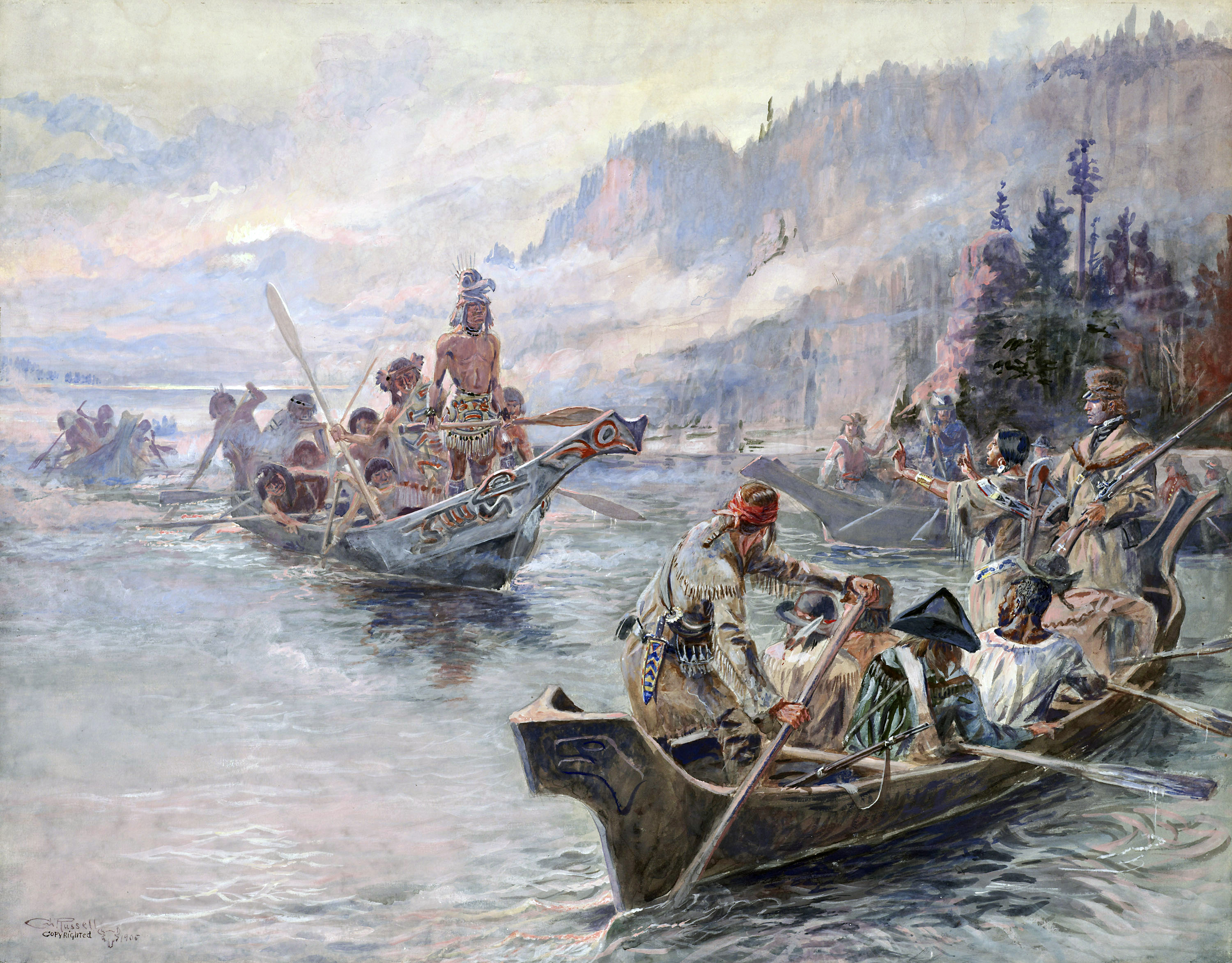
- The Corps of Discovery meet Chinooks on the Lower Columbia, October 1805 (Charles Marion Russell, c. 1905.).
- Active: 1803–1806
- Disbanded: September 1806
- Country: United States
- Branch: Army
- Role: Exploration
- Size: 2 officers; 5 NCOs; 30 enlisted men; Civilians: 3 permanent; 12 temporary

Commanders
- Captain: Meriwether Lewis
- Second Lieutenant: William Clark

The Corps of Discovery was a specially established unit of the United States Army which formed the nucleus of the Lewis and Clark Expedition that took place between May 1804 and September 1806. The Corps was led jointly by Captain Meriwether Lewis and Second Lieutenant William Clark. Commissioned by President Thomas Jefferson, the Corps' objectives were scientific and commercial – to study the area's plants, animal life, and geography, and to learn how the Louisiana Purchase could be exploited economically. Aside from its military composition, the Corps' additional personnel included scouts, boatmen, and civilians.

On its two-year expedition through the Great Plains and the Rocky Mountains, the Corps encountered more than two dozen Native American tribes. Modern research now acknowledges that without such contact or help, the Corps of Discovery would have struggled to have completed their journey.

== History ==
The foundations for the Corps of Discovery were laid when Thomas Jefferson met John Ledyard to discuss a proposed expedition to the Pacific Northwest in the 1780s. In 1802, Jefferson read Alexander Mackenzie's 1801 book about his 1792–1793 overland expedition across Canada to the Pacific Ocean; these exploratory journals influenced his decision to create an American body capable of reaching the Pacific as well. Two years after taking the presidency, Jefferson asked Congress to fund an expedition through the Louisiana Purchase.

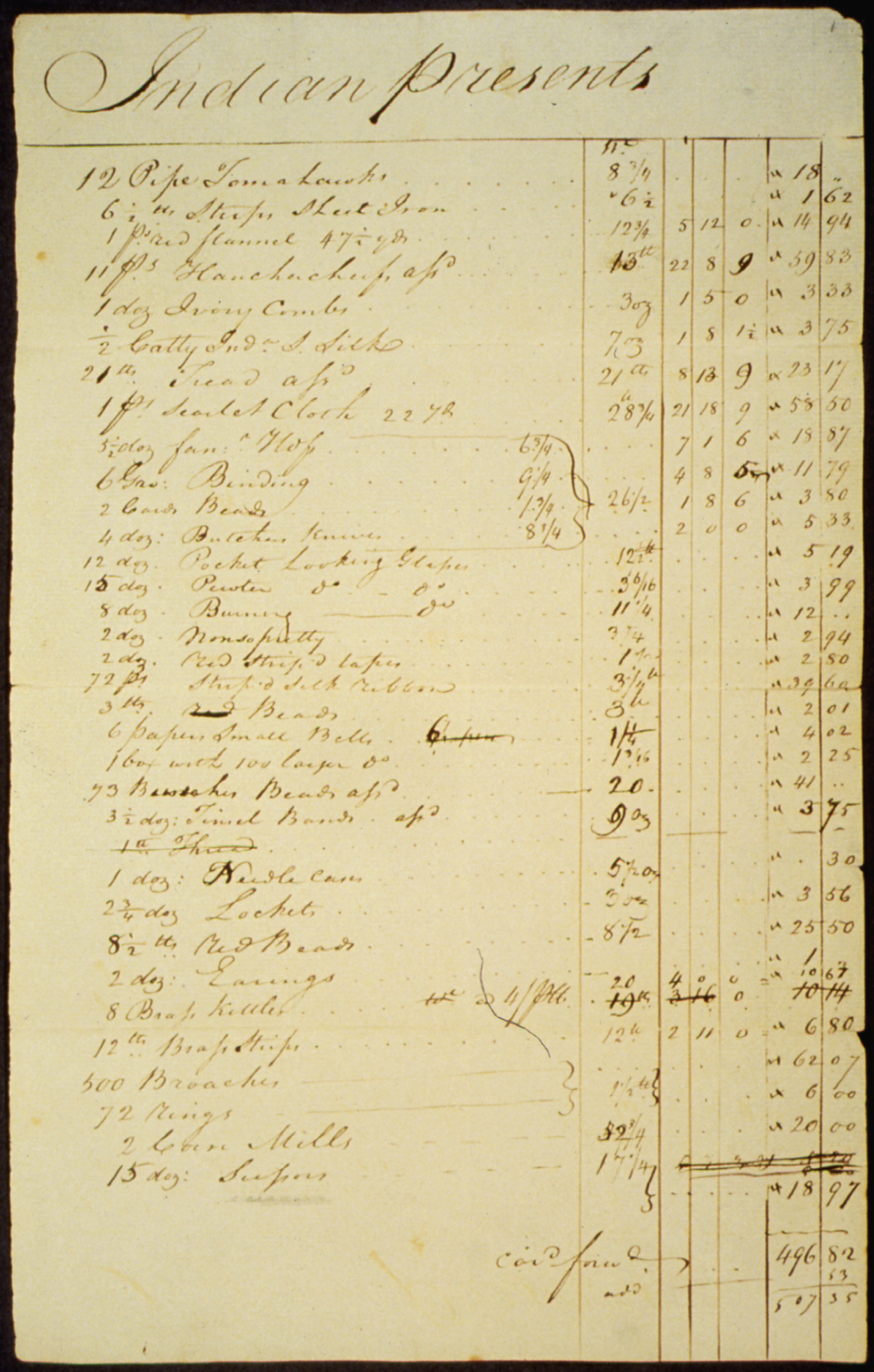
A letter from President Thomas Jefferson to the U.S. Congress, dated January 18, 1803, asking for $2,500 to equip an expedition that would explore the lands west to the Pacific

In 1803, President Thomas Jefferson commissioned the Corps of Discovery, and named as its leader his personal secretary and U.S. Army Captain, Meriwether Lewis, who selected William Clark as his partner. The goals of the Corps of Discovery, whose cadre would be raised primarily from the U.S. military, was to explore the Louisiana Purchase, and establish trade and U.S. sovereignty over the native peoples along the Missouri River. Jefferson also wanted to establish a U.S. claim to the Pacific Northwest and Oregon territory by documenting an American presence there before other European nations could lay title to the land.

The U.S. mint prepared special silver medals with a portrait of Jefferson and had a message of friendship and peace, called Indian Peace Medals or peace medals. The soldiers were to distribute them to the nations they met. But the Corps would be prepared for any acts of hostility because it would be equipped with the most advanced weapons available, such as rifles and a .46 caliber Girandoni Air Rifle. The Corps of Discovery was equipped with sufficient black powder and lead for their flintlock firearms, knives, blacksmithing supplies, and cartography equipment. They also carried flags, gift bundles, medicine and other items they would need for their journey. Much time went into ensuring a sufficient supply of these items.

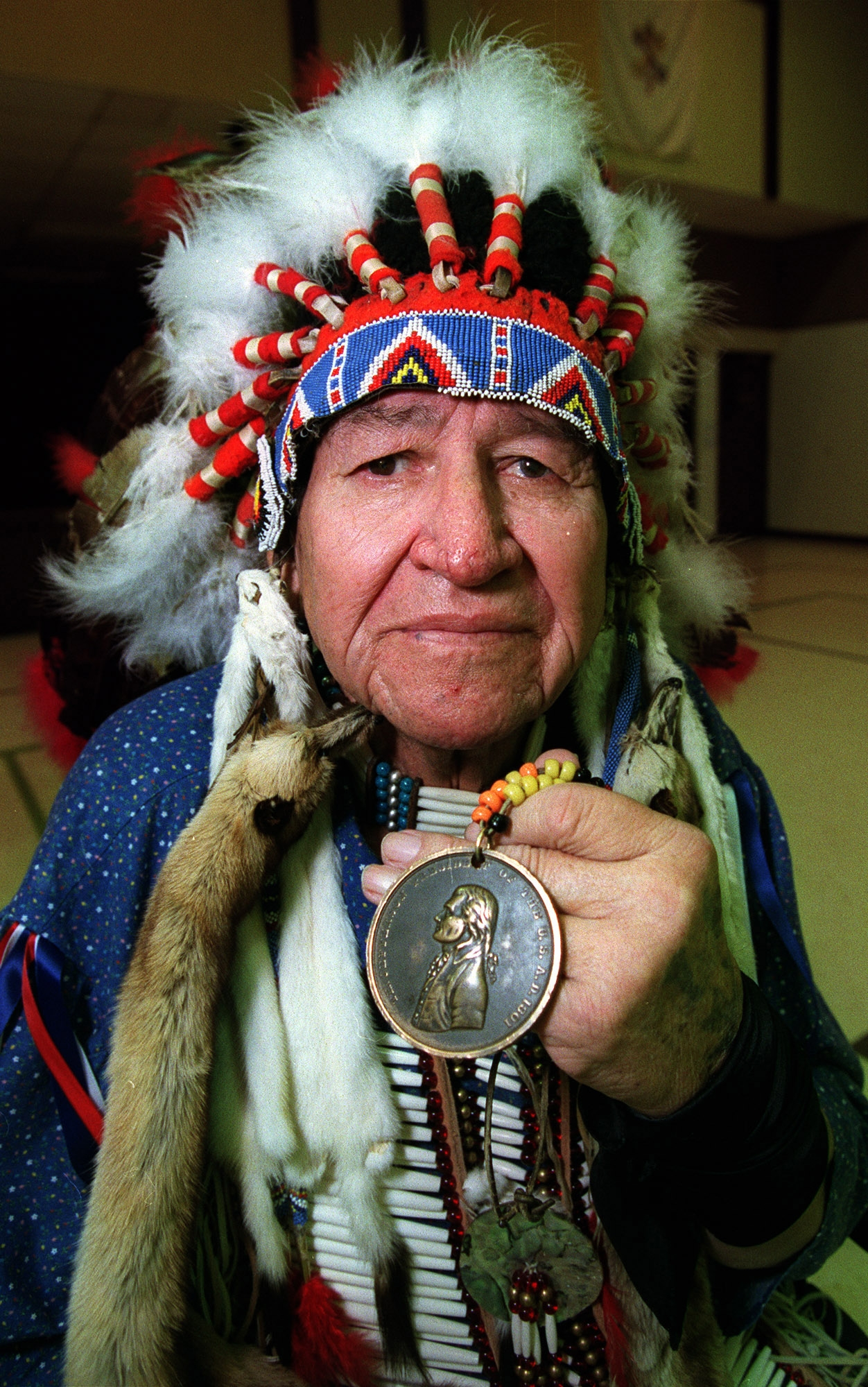
Oglala Sioux Elder, artist Paha Ska of Keystone, South Dakota, holds an original Presidential Peace & Friendship Medallion, given to Indian leaders by the Lewis and Clark Expedition in 1803.

To create the Corps of Discovery, and to ensure any chance of success, Lewis wanted to find the best possible men he could and recruit them to join his expedition. Men were expected to be excellent hunters and possess skills that would ensure their survival in the wilderness. He also wanted men who were brave, unmarried, and healthy. Lewis entrusted recruitment to Clark. He went to Louisville, Kentucky, where he found his first recruits, then Clarksville, Indiana. This group eventually became known as the "Nine Young Men from Kentucky": William Bratton, John Colter, Joseph Field, Reubin Field, Charles Floyd, George Gibson, Nathaniel Pryor, George Shannon, and John Shields. In total almost a third of the party's permanent members – forming the heart of the Corps – were from Louisville, Clarksville or their surrounding areas. Lewis conducted interviews and recruited at Fort Massac, and at the old French Mississippi River village of Kaskaskia. At Kaskaskia, he recruited the expedition's chief non-commissioned officer, John Ordway.

A total of 33 volunteers, including 29 in training, spent the 1803–1804 winter at Camp Dubois in Indiana Territory. On May 14, 1804, the Corps left Dubois by canoe in order to meet up with Lewis at St. Charles, Missouri. The expedition then set off west following the Missouri River on May 21. Three days later, they passed the French settlement of La Charrette, the westernmost Euro-American settlement on the Missouri.

The expedition followed the Missouri through what is now Kansas City, Missouri, and Omaha, Nebraska. On August 20, 1804, Sergeant Charles Floyd died, supposedly by acute appendicitis. He would be the party's only death on the expedition over the next two years. Floyd was buried at Floyd's Bluff in what is now Sioux City, Iowa. During the coming weeks, the expedition would reach the Great Plains. They would be among a select group of white people to see the area abounding with elk, deer, bison, and beavers before the large-scale encroachment of European Americans.

Over the next two years, the Lewis and Clark Expedition established relations with more than two dozen indigenous nations between Missouri and the Pacific Ocean. Some researchers assert that without such contact or help, the Corps of Discovery would have undoubtedly starved to death or become hopelessly lost in the Rocky Mountains.

== Members of the Corps ==
=== Officers ===
Captain Meriwether Lewis
Meriwether Lewis (1774–1809) was born in Ivy, Virginia. He joined the First American Regiment in 1794 and served in the Ohio Valley and the Northwest Territory, where he became friends with William Clark. In 1801, President Thomas Jefferson appointed Lewis as his private secretary. Two years later, Jefferson chose Lewis as commander of the expedition to cross the American continent to the Pacific Ocean. Following the return of the expedition in 1806, Lewis became governor of the Louisiana Territory. However political and personal problems caused him to suffer severe emotional difficulties. Lewis died at an inn on the Natchez Trace, Tennessee.

Second Lieutenant William Clark
William Clark (1770–1838) was born in Caroline County, Virginia. He was the younger brother of General George Rogers Clark. In 1792 he joined the army and served in the Northwest Indian War under General Anthony Wayne. In 1796 he resigned his commission to work in the family business. On accepting Lewis' offer to join the expedition, Clark received a second lieutenant's commission instead of a captaincy because of the Army seniority system. However he and Lewis concealed this from the members of the expedition, who always referred to him as Captain Clark. After returning in 1806, Clark embarked on a distinguished political career, including the governorship of the Missouri Territory.

=== Non-commissioned officers ===
Sergeant John Ordway
John Ordway (1775–1817) was born in New Hampshire. He was the only expedition member who was a sergeant in the U.S. Army before the expedition. Ordway was recruited out of the 1st Infantry Regiment at Fort Kaskaskia. He was well educated and became the senior sergeant of the expedition. Ordway took care of the daily administration and, in the absence of the captain and lieutenant, was left in charge. Ordway was the only member of the Corps to keep a journal throughout the entire expedition. His accounts of Indian life are considered invaluable by modern scholars.

Sergeant Charles Floyd
Charles Floyd (1782–1804) was from Kentucky. He received his promotion to sergeant before the start of the expedition. He was the youngest member in the corps expedition who contracted Bilious Colic during their journey and did not recover, despite the corps efforts. Floyd died on August 20, 1804, near present-day Sioux City, Iowa, from what is now believed to have been ruptured appendix. He would be the only member of the Corps of Discovery who died on the journey. Floyd kept a journal until a few days before his death. Lewis regarded him as "a young man of much merit". A large monument is located at his burial site.
Sergeant Patrick Gass
Patrick Gass (1771–1870) was born in Pennsylvania. He joined the U.S. Army in 1799 where he served in a volunteer Ranger unit. Gass was recruited at Fort Kaskaskia from a company of the 1st Infantry Regiment led by Captain Russell Bissell. His skill as a carpenter was of great value to the expedition. Gass was promoted from private to sergeant in August 1804 following the death of Sgt. Floyd. In 1807, Gass was the first to publish his journal. He stayed in the Army and served in the War of 1812 but was discharged after losing an eye in an accident. Gass was the last known survivor of the Lewis and Clark expedition.
Sergeant Nathaniel Pryor
Pryor (1772–1831) was born in Virginia. He was a widower and the cousin of Charles Floyd. Both Lewis and Clark considered him to be "a man of character and ability". On return in 1806, the expedition helped him secure an officer's commission in the U.S. Army. Pryor rose to the rank of captain and participated in the Battle of New Orleans in 1814. He later served as a government agent for the Osage Indians between 1830 and 1831.
Corporal Richard Warfington
Warfington (b. 1777) was born in North Carolina. He was already a corporal in the 2nd Infantry Regiment when he volunteered to join the expedition. Warfington was considered to be a reliable and efficient NCO. When his enlistment expired during the expedition, Lewis and Clark asked him to stay and command the smaller mid-expedition return party to St. Louis in April 1805. Warfington accepted the command which included sending dispatches, journals, and specimens back to President Jefferson. He completed his mission so successfully he even managed to keep alive a prairie dog and four magpies. On the recommendation of Lewis, Warfington would receive a bonus beyond his regular pay.
Corporal John Robertson
John Robertson (b. 1780) was born in New Hampshire. He was recruited at Fort Kaskaskia from an artillery company. Although initially a corporal, Clark eventually demoted him to private after admonishing him for having "no authority" over his men and for failing to break up a fight at Camp Dubois. Robertson was most likely the first man to leave the expedition. On June 12, 1804, Pvt. Joseph Whitehouse recorded in his journal that a private "belonging to Captain Stoddard's company of Artillery" was sent back to St. Louis with a trading party encountered coming down river. Presumably Robertson returned to his artillery company because there is no further record of him.

=== Privates ===
Private John Boley
John Boley was born in Pennsylvania. He was recruited at Fort Kaskaskia from the 1st Infantry Regiment. After Boley caused disciplinary problems at Camp Dubois, he was sent back with the return party in 1805. In the same year, he joined Zebulon Pike's expedition which explored the upper Mississippi. Boley continued with Pike to the southwest and the Rockies in 1806.
Private William Bratton
William Bratton (1778–1841) was born in Kentucky. He was one of the first volunteers. Bratton served the expedition as a hunter, blacksmith, and gunsmith. In Spring 1806, he became incapacitated with a back ailment until an Indian sweat bath finally cured him. After the expedition, he served in the War of 1812.
Private John Collins
John Collins (d. 1823) was born in Maryland. He was recruited at Fort Kaskaskia from the 1st Infantry Regiment. Although he was a good hunter, he was often drunk and disobedient. He was court-martialed and received 100 lashes for stealing whiskey from the official supply when supposedly guarding it.
Private John Colter
John Colter (1775–1813) was born in Kentucky. During the expedition he proved himself to be an excellent hunter and woodsman. On the return trip to St Louis in 1806, he received permission from the two captains to leave the expedition so he could join a trapping party heading back up the Missouri River. While escaping an attack by Blackfoot Indians, Colter became the first European white man to see the region of steam vents and boiling mud pots nicknamed "Colter's Hell": the future site of Yellowstone National Park.
Private Pierre Cruzatte
Pierre Cruzatte was half French and Omaha Indian. He was both a master boatman and fiddle player. Blind in one eye and nearsighted in the other, Cruzatte accidentally shot Lewis while the two were hunting in August 1806. Lewis later paid tribute to Cruzatte's experience as a riverman and to his integrity. His fiddle playing often entertained the Corps of Discovery and the Native Americans who they encountered.
Private John Dame
John Dame (b. 1784) was born in New Hampshire. He was recruited at Fort Kaskaskia from an artillery company from the Regiment of Artillery led by Captain Amos Stoddard. Dame is mentioned only once in Clark's journal. He was a member of the party that returned to St Louis in 1805.
Private Joseph Field
Joseph Field (1772–1807) was born in Kentucky. Like his brother, Reubin, they were considered to be among the best shots and hunters in the Corps of Discovery. Along with his brother and George Drouillard, they often accompanied the captains on special reconnaissance missions. Both brothers were present with Lewis in the fight with the Blackfeet on July 27, 1806.
Private Reubin Field
Reubin Field (1772–1823) was born in Kentucky. He fatally stabbed a Blackfoot through the heart during the fight on July 27, 1806.
Private Robert Frazer
Robert Frazer (d. 1837) was born in Virginia. No information survives on when Frazer joined the expedition or if he had previously been in the U.S. Army. When the party left St Louis in 1805, he was not part of the Corps of Discovery. Frazer only became part of the Corps on October 8, 1804, after Moses Reed was expelled. He kept a journal and received special permission from the captains to publish. But the publication never took place and the journal is apparently lost. However, Frazer's map of the expedition has survived.
Private George Gibson
George Gibson (d. 1809) was from Kentucky. He was a good hunter and on occasion played the fiddle for the Corps of Discovery. He served as an interpreter with Native Americans using sign language.
Private Silas Goodrich
Silas Goodrich was from Massachusetts. It is unclear whether he had any prior military experience. He was one of the finest fishermen of the Corps of Discovery. After the expedition, Goodrich re-enlisted in the U.S. Army.
Private Hugh Hall
Hugh Hall (b. 1772) was born in Massachusetts. He was recruited at Fort Southwest Point from a company of the 2nd Infantry Regiment. Hall was court-martialed and flogged along with Collins for stealing from the official whiskey ration and getting drunk.
Private Thomas Howard
Thomas Howard (b. 1779) was from Massachusetts. He too was recruited from the 2nd Infantry Regiment at Fort Southwest Point. Howard would become the last member of the Corps to be court-martialed. A Native American had followed his example when he climbed over the walls at Fort Mandan after the gate had been closed. He was found guilty of "pernicious example" to the Indians, by showing them that the fort wall was scalable.
Private François Labiche.
François Labiche was recruited at Fort Kaskaskia. As an enlisted member of the Corps like Cruzatte, he was not hired as a civilian boatman. Labiche was an experienced boatman and Indian trader. He also spoke English, French, and several Indian languages. Lewis was so impressed with his interpreter skills, he recommended him for a bonus. Later Labiche accompanied Lewis to Washington to interpret for the Native American chiefs who went to meet President Jefferson.
Private John Baptiste Lepage
John Lepage was a French-Canadian fur trader who was recruited at Fort Mandan in 1805.
Private Hugh McNeal
Hugh McNeal was from Pennsylvania. He may or may not have been in the Army prior to joining the Corps on April 1, 1804. A man with the same name was on the Army rolls as late as 1811.
Private John Newman
John Newman (1785–1838) was born in Pennsylvania. He was recruited at Fort Massac from a company of the 1st Infantry Regiment. Newman was expelled from the expedition following his court-martial for "having uttered repeated expressions of a highly criminal and mutinous nature". He remained with the expedition doing hard labor until sent back with the return party to St. Louis in April 1805.
Private John Potts
John Potts (1776–1808) was from Germany. Before joining the U.S. Army he had been a miller. Potts was recruited at South West Point from a company of the 2nd Infantry Regiment. Following the expedition in 1806, he joined St. Louis businessman Manuel Lisa on a fur-trading venture to the upper Missouri. In 1808 he and his friend John Colter were ambushed by Blackfeet near Three Forks, Montana on the Missouri River. Potts was killed and Colter narrowly escaped.
Private Moses Reed
Moses Reed's origin and background are largely unknown. In August 1804, he attempted to desert the Corp but was apprehended, court-martialed, and expelled from the expedition. However he remained with the expedition as a boatsman until being sent back with the return party to St. Louis in April 1805.
Private George Shannon
George Shannon (1785–1836) from Pennsylvania was the youngest member of the Corps of Discovery. He joined Lewis at Maysville, Kentucky. During the Fall of 1804, he was lost for more than two weeks and nearly starved to death. After the expedition, Shannon became a lawyer and later served as a senator from Missouri.
Private John Shields
John Shields (1769–1809) was from Virginia. He was also the oldest member of the Corps of Discovery and one of the few who were married. Throughout the expedition, Shields' skills as a blacksmith, gunsmith, and carpenter were highly appreciated. "Nothing was more peculiarly useful to us, in various situations," wrote Lewis, "than the skill of this man as an artist, in repairing our guns, accoutrements, &c." In 1806, Lewis recommended that Congress give Shields a bonus for his services.
Private John Thompson
Very little information is known about John Thompson, other than Clark praising him as "a valuable member of our party". He may have been a surveyor before joining the expedition.
Private Ebenezer Tuttle
Ebenezer Tuttle (b. 1773) was born in Connecticut. He was recruited at Fort Kaskaskia from the Regiment of Artillery. Tuttle was a member of the return party to St Louis in April 1805. The only mention of him in Clark's journals is in a Detachment Order of May 26, 1804.
Private Peter Weiser
Peter Weiser (b. 1781) was from Pennsylvania. He was recruited at Fort Kaskaskia from the 1st Infantry Regiment. Weiser was related to the notable frontier diplomat Conrad Weiser. After the expedition he joined Manuel Lisa's fur-trading venture up the Missouri.
Private William Werner
Scant information is known about William Werner. Records show he had a fight with John Potts at Camp Dubois and was also convicted of being AWOL at St. Charles, Missouri. Other than these incidents, the journals reveal little about him.
Private Isaac White
Isaac White (b. 1774) was from Massachusetts. He was recruited at Fort Kaskaskia from its artillery company. White was a member of the return party to St. Louis in April 1805. The only mention of him in the journals is in a Detachment Order of May 26, 1804.
Private Joseph Whitehouse
Joseph Whitehouse (b. 1775) was from Virginia / Kentucky. He was recruited at Fort Massac from the 1st Infantry Regiment. Whitehouse was initially expelled from the Corps for deserting but was allowed to return after repenting. He kept a journal and often acted as a tailor for the other men. Whitehouse later served during the War of 1812 but deserted from the U.S. Army in 1817.
Private Alexander Willard
Alexander Willard (1778–1865) was born in New Hampshire. He was recruited at Fort Kaskaskia from the artillery company. Willard worked with Shields as a blacksmith for the Corps, but after he was convicted of sleeping while on guard duty (a crime punishable by death), he was given 100 lashes and sent back with the return party in April 1805. Willard later served during the War of 1812.
Private Richard Windsor
Only a small amount of information is known about Richard Windsor. He was recruited at Fort Kaskaskia from the First American Regiment. During the expedition he served the Corps an experienced woodsman and productive hunter.

== Attached party ==
=== Permanent ===
Toussaint Charbonneau and Sacagawea
Charbonneau was either sold or given Sacagawea, who was born around 1788, near Lemhi, Idaho. The daughter of a Shoshone chief, she was kidnapped by the Hidatsa and sold into slavery to the Mandan, who passed her on to Charbonneau, who made her his wife. On February 11, 1805, she gave birth to a son named John Baptiste. Lewis described Charbonneau as a man "of no particular merit", while both captains acknowledged the indispensable service Sacagawea provided the Corps of Discovery. As Clark wrote, "a woman with a party of men is a token of peace".
George Drouillard
Drouillard (d. 1810) was from Canada. The son of a French-Canadian and a Shawnee mother, Drouillard first met Lewis at Fort Massac. Captain Daniel Bissell was probably employing Drouillard when Lewis recruited him for the expedition. Drouillard was known for his general skill as a scout, woodsman, and interpreter. He was one of the best hunters of the expedition and often conducted special missions for Lewis and Clark. After the expedition, Drouillard became a partner in Manuel Lisa's fur-trading ventures on the upper Missouri and Yellowstone Rivers.
York
York (b. 1770) was a slave from Virginia who had been Clark's companion from childhood. In 1799 Clark legally inherited York. Journals indicated he was large, strong, and perhaps overweight. He carried a rifle during the expedition and performed his full share of duties like the other members of the Corps of Discovery. After the expedition, York asked Clark for his freedom but Clark refused. He then asked if he could live and work in Louisville and send money back to Clark. York wanted to do this to be near his wife, who was enslaved by another man. Clark said no to this too. Clark wrote to his brother about this request and his denial of it. He stated: ""[I will] permit [York] to Stay a fiew weeks with his wife ... [but] he is Serviceable to me at this place, and I am determined not ... to gratify him, and have directed him to return," Clark (whose spelling was abysmal) wrote in an 1808 letter to his brother. "If any attempt is made by York to run off, or refuse to proform his duty as a Slave, I wish him Sent to New Orleands and sold, or hired out to Some Sevare Master until he thinks better of Such Conduct."
Seaman (dog)
A newfoundland dog that Lewis purchased in Pittsburgh while waiting for the completion of boats for the expedition, Seaman made the entire trip with the Corps.

=== Engagés (contract boatmen) ===
E. Cann
Cann (1775–1836) was born Alexander Carson but had lived among the French for so long he was thought of as French. Cann returned to St. Louis with Corporal Warfington in April 1805.
Charles Caugee
Caugee was one of the original nine boatmen hired by the Corps.
Joseph Collin
Collin is mentioned in the journal of Sgt. Gass who described him as "a young man who formerly belonged to the North West Company". It appears he accompanied the corps only as far as the Arikara Indian villages and was still living there when Lewis and Clark passed through again on their return in 1806.
Jean-Baptiste Deschamps
Deschamps was a private in the U.S. Army at Fort Kaskaskia who was recruited to be the foreman of the French contract boatmen. He returned to St. Louis with Corporal Warfington in 1805.
Charles Hebert
Hebert was married to Julie Hebert dit La Croix in 1792. He had 11 baptized children. Hebert was enlisted by Lewis before the Corps left Camp Dubois. He was voluntarily discharged at the Mandan village in the winter of 1804.
Jean-Baptiste La Jeunesse
La Jeunesse, who was enlisted as a private in the U.S. Army, served as a boatman with the expedition. Although there is no record of his service or discharge from the military, he may have remained at the Mandan village when the expedition continued west in April 1805 or returned to St. Louis with Corporal Warfington.
La Liberté
La Liberté, who was also known as Joseph Barter, was a private in the U.S. Army at Fort Kaskaskia before he was assigned duties as a boatman. However, he deserted soon afterwards and did not accompany the expedition westward when it departed Camp Dubois in May 1804.
Étienne Malboeuf
Malboeuf (b. 1775) was recruited at Fort Kaskaskia as a contract boatman. His sister was married to Jean Baptiste La Jeunesse.
Peter (Pierre) Pinaut
Pinaut (b. 1776) was the son of a French-Canadian trader and a Missouri Indian woman. He is listed as a member of the corps as of May 1804. He probably returned to St. Louis in 1805.
Paul Primeau
Primeau was hired as a boatman at Fort Kaskaskia and listed as a member of the corps in May 1804. It is unclear if he returned to St. Louis with Corporal Warfington or remained on the upper Missouri.
François Rivet
Rivet (1757–1852) was hired at Fort Kaskaskia in 1804 as a contract boatman. Rivet, along with three other boatmen (Deschamps, Malboeuf, and Carson) remained at the Mandan village over the winter after they were discharged from the expedition. Rivet had originally departed with Corporal Warfington, but returned to the Mandan village and was living there when Lewis and Clark passed through on their way east in 1806.
Peter Roi
Due to the commonality of the family name of Roi (usually spelled Roy) among the French living in and around St. Louis in the early 19th century, surviving records give little information.

== See also ==
- Timeline of the Lewis and Clark Expedition
