= John Ordway =

American 18th century soldier and explorer

- John Ordway statue in Fort Lewis Memorial Park, Fort Lewis, Washington
- Born: 1775; Hebron, New Hampshire
- Died: 1817 (aged 42); New Madrid, Missouri Territory
- Spouses: Abigail "Gracey" Walker; Elizabeth Johnson
- Military career
- Allegiance: United States
- Branch: United States Army
- Rank: Sergeant
- Units: Corps of Discovery
- Missions: Lewis and Clark Expedition

Sergeant John Ordway (c. 1775 – c. 1817), the youngest of ten siblings, was an important part of the Lewis and Clark Expedition across the United States. John Ordway was one of the sergeants from the United States Army who stepped forward to volunteer for the Corps of Discovery. Ordway exercised many responsibilities on the trip, such as issuing the provisions, appointing guard duties, and keeping the registers and records. John Ordway also kept a detailed journal about Native American life during the expedition.

== Early life ==
John Ordway was probably born in 1775 in the town of Hebron, New Hampshire, though some sources say Dunbarton.

== Lewis and Clark Expedition ==
Sergeant Ordway was recruited for the journey at Fort Kaskaskia. He was 29 years old and one of the few educated men on the trip. The expedition lasted from May 1804 to September 1806. Before the journey, John Ordway sent a message to his parents telling them of the purpose and determination of the expedition:

We are to ascend the Missouri River with a boat as far as it is navigable and then go by land, to the western ocean, if nothing prevents, &c. This party consists of 25 picked Men of the army & country and I am So happy as to be one of the, pick'd Men...We are to start in ten days up the Missouri River...We expect to be gone 18 months or two years...If we make Great Discoveries as we expect, the united States, has promised to make us Great Rewards more than we are promised, &c."

In February 1804, during the staging of the journey and still at Camp Dubois (also known as Camp Wood), Illinois, while Lewis and Clark were away and Ordway was in charge, some of the men became drunk while they were on their guard duty. In another incident on March 29, 1804, privates John Shields and John Colter, who were second cousins, threatened Ordway's life. Both were put on trial for mutiny. However, both of them pleaded for, and received, forgiveness. After Colter's return from the Oregon Coast with the Lewis and Clark Expedition Colter became the first known person of European descent to explore Yellowstone National Park and to see the Teton Mountain Range. Colter is widely considered to be the first known mountain man.

On the trip back to St. Louis, Missouri, where they started, John Ordway was asked to lead 10 men back to the head of the Jefferson River, where the Corps left their canoes before crossing the mountains. They were to follow the river and travel to the Missouri River, where they would meet Lewis and Clark. Ordway and his group successfully completed this assignment.

== Post-Expedition years ==
John Ordway returned from the Lewis and Clark Expedition and married Gracey Walker and became a successful landowner in what became New Madrid County, Missouri. He became the owner of two plantations, peach and apple orchards, which became very prosperous.

== Death ==
In 1817, Ordway died of unknown causes at approximately age 42.
