= Dennis Pennington =

American politician

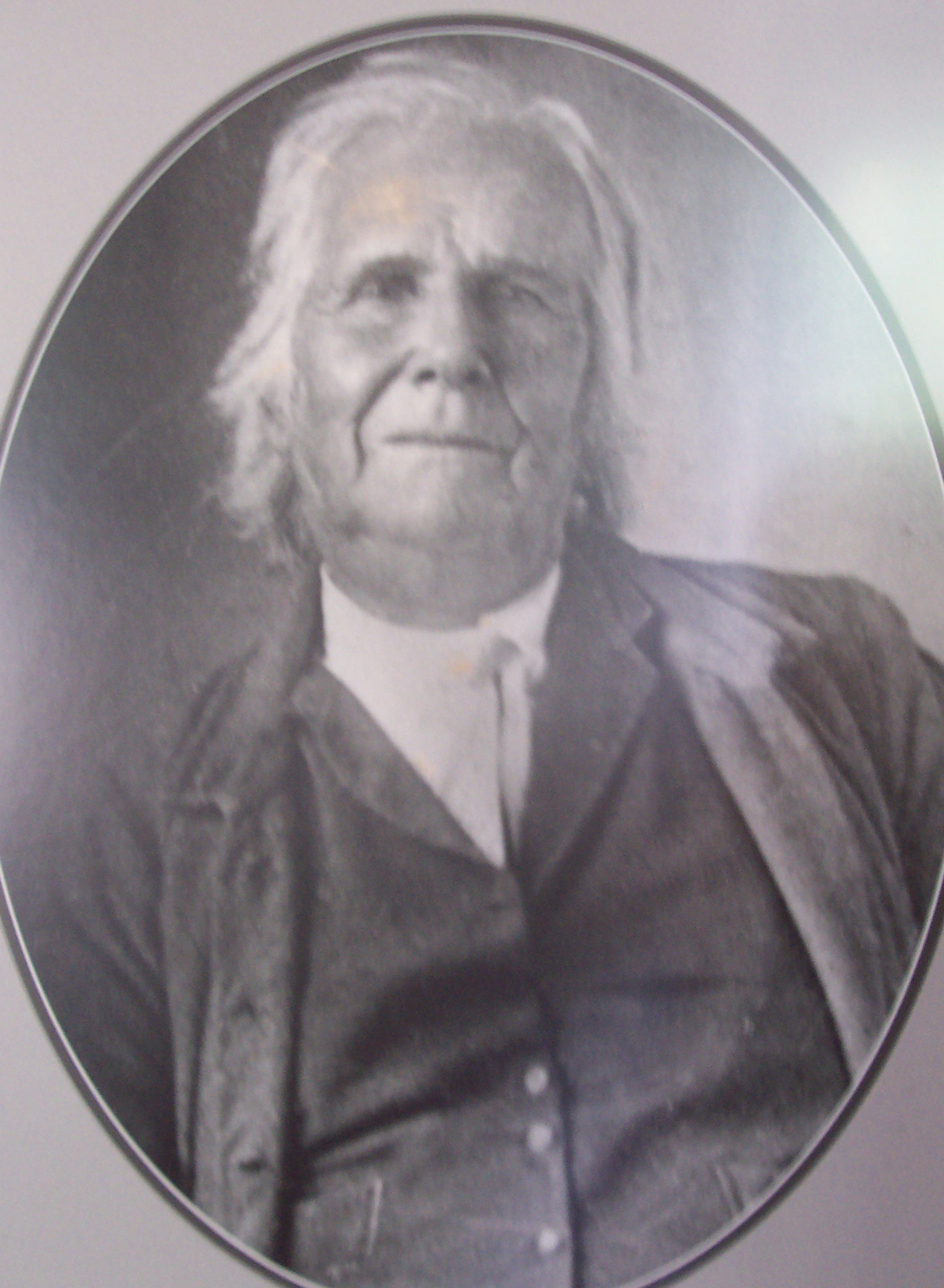
- Photo of Dennis Pennington on display in the Indiana First State Capitol Building

Indiana Territorial Legislature speaker
- In office 1810–1816
- Preceded by: None
- Succeeded by: None
- Constituency: Harrison County

Indiana State Senate Speaker (1816–18)
- In office 1816–1820
- In office 1825–1827
- In office 1830–1833
- In office 1842–1845
- Constituency: Harrison County

Indiana House of Representatives
- In office 1822–1824
- In office 1828–1830
- In office 1845–1846
- Constituency: Harrison County

Personal details
- Born: May 18, 1776 Cumberland County, Virginia
- Died: September 2, 1854 (aged 78) Harrison County, Indiana, U.S.
- Party: Whig Party
- Spouse: Elizabeth English
- Relations: Walter Q. Gresham (grandnephew)
- Occupation: Farmer, stonemason, politician
- Nickname(s): "Old Uncle Dennis", "Father Pennington"

Dennis Pennington (May 18, 1776 – September 2, 1854) was a farmer and a stonemason who became known for his many years in public office as an early legislator in the Indiana Territory and in Indiana's General Assembly as a representative of Harrison County, Indiana. Pennington, a member of the Whig Party, became the first speaker of the Indiana territorial legislature's lower house in 1810, served as the territory's census enumerator in 1815, and represented Harrison County as one of its five delegates to the constitutional convention of 1816. Pennington was the first speaker of the Indiana Senate (1816 to 1818), and served in the state legislature for eighteen years, which included five years in the Indiana House of Representatives and thirteen years in the Indiana Senate. His major political contributions relate to his strong opposition to slavery. Pennington ran unsuccessfully for Indiana's lieutenant governor in 1825. In addition to his service in the state legislature, Penning was a Harrison County sheriff and a justice of the peace, a trustee of Indiana University, and a member of the Grand Lodge of Indiana. He also supervised construction of the limestone courthouse that served as Indiana's first state capitol building in Corydon, Indiana. The historic Old Capitol, the seat of state government from 1816 to 1825, is one of his most enduring legacies. Fondly remembered as "Old Uncle Dennis" or "Father Pennington," he was known for his common sense and strong character and became one of Harrison County's most influential citizens.

== Early life and education ==
Pennington was born in Cumberland County, Virginia, just before American Independence, on May 18, 1776, to Nancy "Nettie" (Lark or Larke) and Edward Pennington. Dennis had five siblings (four brothers and one sister). Although he received little to no formal schooling, Pennington's education came from life experiences and interactions with others.

In the fall of 1797 Pennington moved west to Kentucky, traveling part of the way with anti-slavery advocate Henry Clay. Pennington, who farmed land east of Louisville, befriended Clay and supported Clay's attempt to make Kentucky a Free State In 1799.

== Marriage and family ==
Pennington married Elizabeth English in Kentucky on August 4, 1800. Native Americans captured Elizabeth, along with her siblings, Virginia "Jinnie" and Matthew, when she was four years old. Elizabeth was returned to the English family at the age of thirteen. She died in 1857.

Elizabeth's sister, Virginia, married Dennis's brother, William, in 1804. William and Virginia Pennington settled near present-day Lanesville, Indiana, a part of the Northwest Territory at that time. Dennis's sister, Mary, married George Greshham, the grandparents of Walter Quintin Gresham. Walter Gresham was partially named for Walter Pennington, a Methodist minister and one of Mary's and Dennis's brothers.

== Career ==
Sometime between 1801 and 1804 Pennington crossed the Ohio River Louisville, Kentucky, entering the Northwest Territory at Clarksville. Pennington arrived in Harrison County around 1802, purchased land near Lanesville, where his brother, William resided with his family, built a homestead, and established a farm. Around 1804 Around 1804 Pennington was among the early pioneers who explored the site in what became the town of Corydon, Indiana, where he built a cabin. In 1815 Pennington moved to "the Barrens" (the present-day community of Central Barren, Indiana), 4 miles (6.4 km) north of Corydon. Pennington's brother, Walter, joined him at the Barrens, where they built a Methodist meetinghouse called Pennington Chapel.

== Political career ==
Pennington, a farmer and stonemason and became active in politics as a member of the Whig Party and an anti-slavery activist. According to family tradition, as Pennington traveled in the Northwest Territory in the late 1790s Pennington met Arthur St. Clair, governor of the Northwest Territory, and Thomas Worthington, a fellow Virginian who became governor of Ohio. Pennington's contact with these men, along with the success of the anti-slavery movement in Ohio, reportedly influenced his decision to become an anti-slavery activist. On one of his trips to Vincennes, the territorial capital, Pennington encountered William Henry Harrison, who became the pro-slavery governor of the Indiana Territory in 1801.

Initially, Pennington supported Harrison's political ambitions, but changed his position when the governor began initiating pro-slavery policies within the Indiana Territory, which was established in 1800 from the western portion of the Northwest Territory. On December 28, 1802, Harrison asked the U.S. Congress for a ten-year suspension of Article VI of the Northwest Ordinance of 1787 that prohibited slavery in the territory. Harrison argued that the anti-slavery clause discouraged migration of slave-owning settlers into the territory, but his request was denied. In September 1803 Harrison and his pro-slavery supporters introduced measures in the territorial general assembly that allowed indentured servitude, a form a slavery, within the territory. In 1805, when President Thomas Jefferson delegated his authority to Harrison to make appointments to the territory's Legislative Council, the territorial governor appointed his pro-slavery political supporters, who continued efforts to legalize slavery within the territory.

Pennington, who became a justice of the peace for Harrison County in 1807, entered politics in open opposition of Harrison and the pro-slavery government. On October 10, 1807, Pennington vocalized his opposition to slavery during a meeting at Springville in Clark County. Pennington's speech condemned slavery and the government that legalized it. The meeting attendees drafted and adopted a resolution opposing slavery in the territory and resolved to put an end to the "despised institution". Pennington also supported the doctrine of "squatter sovereignty," which would grant citizens the right to decide the future of slavery in the territory. On February 27, 1809, the U.S. Congress amended the Northwest Ordinance to allow the Indiana Territory's citizens to elect representatives to its bicameral legislature, which reduced the governor's power. (Previously representatives to the lower house were selected popular election and the governor appointed members to the Legislative Council (upper house) from a pool of men nominees provided by the elected representatives in the lower house.)

=== Territorial legislator ===
On April 2, 1810, Pennington was elected as the Harrison County representative to the territorial legislature's lower house. Many of his anti-slavery cohorts were also elected to the legislature, giving them an overwhelming majority. Pennington became the first speaker of the territorial legislature's lower house. He introduced and helped pass laws to repeal the slavery and indenturing laws implemented by Harrison, and along with his anti-slavery allies sought to prohibit the introduction of indentured servitude, including slavery, into the territory.

Shortly after the outbreak of the War of 1812, Pennington wrote a resolution to relocate the territorial capital: "Resolved, that the capitol be removed from Vincennes, because it is dangerous to continue longer here on account of threatened depredations of the Indians, who may destroy our valuable records." Corydon, Pennington's hometown, competed with Charlestown, Clarksville, Jeffersonville, Lawrenceburg, and Madison, to become the new territorial capital.

Pennington helped secure Corydon's selection as the new seat of government, which became effective May 1, 1813, by pointing out its ideal location. The Harrison County court had approved a design for a new county courthouse that the territorial legislature could use for its assembly building. Pennington was awarded the contract to supervise construction of the new courthouse, which began in 1814 and was nearly completed when Indiana's first state legislature convened at Corydon in 1816. The construction cost of the new building was approximately about $3,000. It served as Indiana's first state capitol building from 1816 to 1825.

On March 3, 1813, Thomas Posey succeeded Harrison as governor of the Indiana Territory and head of the pro-slavery party. Pennington continued to attack the territory's pro-slavery faction and, according to some sources, his unrelenting political assault drove Posey from the capital at Corydon. (Posey claimed his poor health required him to be near to his physician at Jeffersonville.)

In 1815 Pennington served as the Indiana Territory's census enumerator. He used the position to promote his anti-slavery platform to every home within the territory and laid the groundwork for the election of anti-slavery delegates to the constitutional convention. Pennington and other members of the anti-slavery movement tried to prevent slavery from becoming a part of Indiana's state constitution, which would be drafted in June 1816. Pennington remarked, "Let us be on our guard when our convention men are chosen that they be men opposed to slavery."

As speaker of the Indiana Territory's lower house of representatives, Pennington signed the memorial to the U.S. Congress in 1815 stating its qualification to become a state and asking permission to hold a convention to discuss statehood. David Robb, president of the territorial council, signed the memorial on behalf of the legislature's upper chamber. The request was presented in the U.S. House of Representatives on December 28, 1815, and introduced in the U.S. Senate on January 2, 1816. President James Madison signed an Enabling Act on April 19, 1816, that authorized the constitutional convention. If a majority of its delegates agreed, the delegation would proceed to draft a state constitution for Indiana.

=== State constitutional convention delegate ===
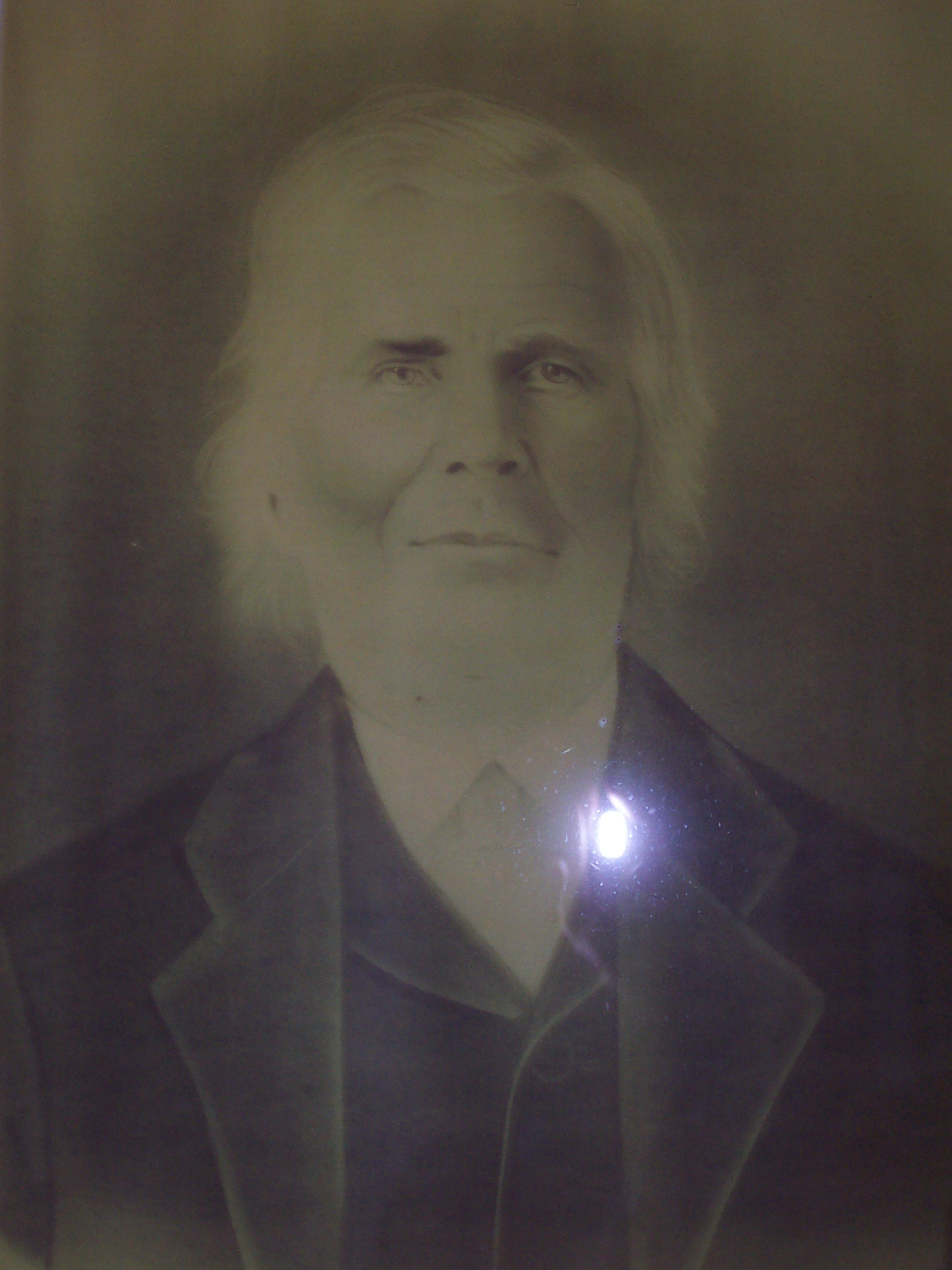
Portrait of Dennis Pennington

In May 1816 Pennington was elected as one of Harrison County's five delegate to attend Indiana's first constitutional convention. Pennington was present when the delegates convened at Corydon from June 10 to 29, 1816, to consider statehood and to draft Indiana's first state constitution. As a slavery opponent he allied himself with Jonathan Jennings and other anti-slavery delegates. The group was successful in their efforts to include a provision in the state constitution that prohibited constitutional amendments to allow slavery in Indiana.

As outlined in Article VIII, Section 1, Indiana's 1816 constitution banned any alteration or amendment of the state constitution that would introduce slavery or involuntary servitude into the state:

But, as the holding any part of the human Creation in slavery, or involuntary servitude, can only originate in usurpation and tyranny, no alteration of this constitution shall ever take place so as to introduce slavery or involuntary servitude in this State, otherwise than for the punishment of crimes, whereof the party shall have been duly convicted.

The anti-slavery faction of the constitutional convention also hoped that statehood for Indiana, which would give its citizens the authority to elect their own governor instead of having one appointed by the U.S. president, would rid the new state of pro-slavery governors in the future.

=== State legislator ===
After statehood was achieved in 1816, Pennington was elected to a seat in the Indiana Senate and served as its first speaker from 1816 to 1818. He continued to be an outspoken critic of slavery and a Whig. Pennington's eighteen years of service representing Harrison County in the Indiana General Assembly included thirteen years in the Indiana Senate and five in the Indiana House of Representatives. Pennington served in the Indiana Senate 1816–20, 1825–27, 1830–33, and 1842–45, and as a state representatives in 1822–24, 1828–30, and 1845–46.

In 1818, Pennington, a lifelong anti-slavery activist, had three Kentuckians indicted for violating Indiana's "man stealing act," when they forcibly removed a black woman from a home in Harrison County, Indiana, and took her to Kentucky. Governor Jennings asked Gabriel Slaughter, the governor of Kentucky, to return the men to Indiana to stand trial; however, several years of correspondence, the Kentucky governor refused on constitutional grounds. The incident caused Governor Jennings to change his position on helping fugitive slaves escape. Instead, he attempted to prevent them from entering the state.

Pennington was a candidate for Indiana's lieutenant governor in 1825, but he was defeated. During the campaign and as one of the most outspoken members of the Indiana General Assembly, Pennington opposed the state's massive plan for internal improvements, especially the construction of the Wabash and Erie Canal. He was among the nine legislators, which included James Whitcomb, who voted against the Mammoth Internal Improvement Act of 1836. He opposed the majority view, claiming their plans would have no direct benefits for his constituents and would only bankrupt the state. Pennington also argued that the arrival of railroads would quickly make plans for a statewide canal system obsolete. His predictions proved to be nearly correct.

The entire system of internal improvements, which included a network of roads, canals, and railroads, was never fully completed and the massive projects bankrupted the state government. By 1841 the state was unable to repay its debt on the projects in 1847 government officials finally agreed to a settlement with investors and creditors for the state to repay $11,065,000, about half its total debt at that time. (Its initial appropriation was $10 million). Instead of receiving repayment in cash, some creditors accepted stock in the Wabash and Erie Canal, which eventually covered 468 miles (753 km). Although Indiana's canal system ultimately proved to be financially unprofitable for its investors, it increased trade and commerce and contributed to the development of Indiana towns along its towpaths when it was in operation.

After Pennington lost his bid to become Indiana's lieutenant governor, he continued to serve in the Indiana General Assembly until 1846. He was one of the oldest men in the Indiana House and was affectionately called "Old Uncle Dennis" and "Father Pennington".

== Later years ==
Pennington remained active in civic life during his later years. He became a trustee of Indiana University. In 1850 he served as a census enumerator for Harrison County.

When Pennington was about sixty years old he was appointed to fill an unexpired term as sheriff of Harrison County, and won election to a second term. During the campaign his opponent claimed Pennington's age and infirmities would make him unable to fulfill the duties of the office. Pennington responded by challenging the younger candidate to a wrestling match. His opponent declined; Pennington won that election.

== Death and legacy ==
Pennington died at his Harrison County home near Corydon on September 2, 1854, at the age of seventy-eight. He was buried in Harrison County's Pennington Chapel Cemetery.

Pennington is remembered for his honesty and common sense, as well as his kindness. As a "grand old man" in Indiana politics, he remained politically active for nearly thirty years. Pennington is best known for his opposition to slavery and years of public service representing Harrison County as a territorial and state legislator. Beginning in 1810 he served speaker of its lower house of representatives and helped secure Corydon's selection as the new seat of government in 1813. Pennington was also a delegate to the 1816 constitutional convention that drafted Indiana's first state constitution and served in the Indiana General Assembly for eighteen years.

Pennington's most visible legacy is located in Corydon, Indiana, where he supervised construction of Indiana's first state capitol building. The Old Capitol, located in the Corydon Historic District, is part of the Corydon Capital State Historic Site, administered by the Indiana State Museum and Historic Sites.

== Honors and tributes ==
The Kintner House Inn, a bed and breakfast in Corydon, Indiana, named one of its guest rooms in honor of Pennington, one of Harrison County's most influential citizens.

== See also ==
- Corydon Historic District
- History of slavery in Indiana
