= Corydon Historic District =

Historic district in Indiana, United States

- U.S. National Register of Historic Places
- U.S. Historic district
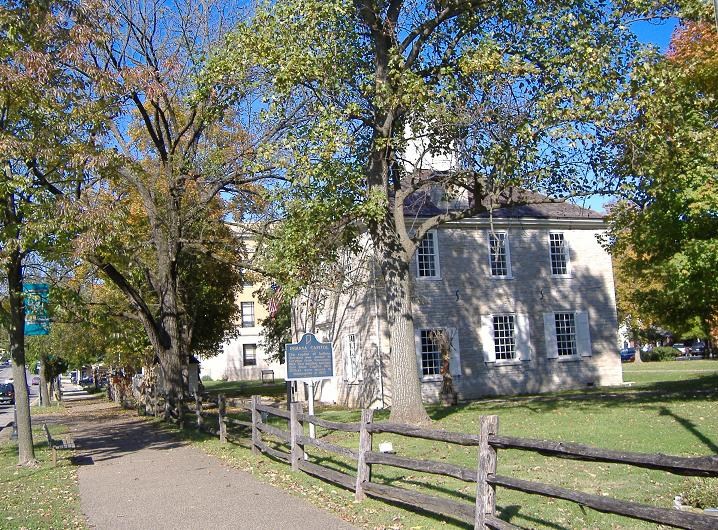
- Old State Capitol

- Location within Harrison County, Indiana Location within Indiana Location within the United States
- Location: Not specified (original); Roughly bounded by Summit, Maple & Walnut Sts., College Ave., Chestnut, Capitol, Poplar, Water, Beaver & Mulberry Sts. (increase), Corydon, Indiana
- Coordinates: 38°12′42″N 86°7′26″W
- Built: 1813
- Architect: George L. Mesker & Co.; William Mitchell (increase)
- Architectural style: Federal (original); Italianate, Queen Anne (increase)
- Website: indianamuseum.org/historic-sites/corydon-capitol
- NRHP reference No.: 73000017 and 89000243
- Added to NRHP: August 28, 1973 (original); June 27, 1989 (increase)

The Corydon Historic District is a national historic district located in Corydon, Indiana, United States. The town of Corydon is also known as Indiana's First State Capital and as Historic Corydon. The district was added to the National Register of Historic Places in 1973, but the listing was amended in 1988 to expand the district's geographical boundaries and include additional sites. The district includes numerous historical structures, most notably the Old Capitol (Indiana's first state capitol building), the Old Treasury Building (Indiana's first state office building), Governor Hendricks' Headquarters, the Constitution Elm Memorial, the Posey House, the Kintner-McGrain House (Cedar Glade), and The Kintner House Inn, as well as other residential and commercial sites.

== History ==
Corydon, Indiana, which was platted in 1808, continues to serve as the county seat of government for Harrison County, Indiana. The town served as the second capital of the Indiana Territory from 1813 to 1816, but it is best known for its service as the first capital of Indiana from 1816 to 1825. Some of the most significant structures within the historic district date from this early period of the town's history, including the Old Capitol, the centerpiece of the district.

Corydon became the seat of government for the Indiana Territory when the territorial capital was moved from Vincennes, in Knox County, shortly after the outbreak of the War of 1812. Dennis Pennington, a Harrison County representative and the speaker of the territorial legislature's lower house, helped secure Corydon's selection as the capital by pointing out that the Harrison County Courthouse, which the county government planned to build on Corydon's public square, could be used as an assembly building for the territorial legislature. Pennington was awarded the contract to supervise construction of the courthouse, which became known as the Old Capitol.

In addition to its role as the capitol of the Indiana Territory, Corydon served as the site of a constitutional convention to consider statehood for Indiana in 1816. Forty-three delegates convened from June 10 to 29, 1816, to draft Indiana's first state constitution. Sources disagree on the exact location of the gathering. Because the courthouse was not completed at that time, the delegates met at "the courthouse on the hill," which may have referred to a nearby log home that the territorial government had rented. Cramped conditions and the summer heat caused the men to gather under a giant elm tree, which was later named the Constitution Elm. The town's historic district includes a portion of the tree's preserved trunk, surrounded by a sandstone memorial.

The Indiana General Assembly met for the first time at Corydon under the new constitution and state government on November 4, 1816, and Indiana was admitted as the nineteenth state in the Union on December 11, 1816. Corydon served as the first state capital of Indiana from 1816 to 1825, when the seat of state government was moved to Indianapolis. When the historic district was first added to the National Register of Historic Places in 1973, the area encompassed eight sites that existed when Corydon became the capital of Indiana in 1816. These include the Old Capitol building (Harrison County Courthouse), along with the public square surrounding it, Indiana's first state office building (also known as the Old Treasury Building), Governor William Hendricks' Headquarters, the Constitution Elm, the Posey House, the Westfall House, the Branham home/tavern, and the Kintner-McGrain House (named Cedar Glade).

In 1989 the district was extended to Indian Creek in the north and west, east to College Avenue, and south to Little Indian Creek to include additional historic structures. The district's period of significance spans from 1808 to 1929. The district's boundary increase encompassed the eight structures from its early era as a territorial and state capital, as well as commercial and residential buildings constructed after 1825, including a new, three-story county Harrison County Courthouse that was completed in 1929.

A historical marker erected on the Harrison County Courthouse lawn denotes the town's surrender to Confederate Brigadier General John Hunt Morgan's raiders following the Battle of Corydon on July 9, 1863. The battle site, which is located outside of town, is listed separately on the National Register. The district's courthouse square also includes a memorial to the late Indiana governor Frank O'Bannon; his father, Robert P. O'cannon; and grandfather, Lew O'cannon, all of whom were prominent in Corydon. Plans for the O'Bannon memorial on the southwest corner of the courthouse square were announced on May 22, 2007. It includes a lifesize bronze statue of Frank O'Bannon sitting on a limestone bench and three pillars honoring the O'Bannons. The memorial, which cost $200,000, was dedicated in June 2008. Because of its history as a territorial and state capital, Corydon sees an estimated 30,000 visitors each year.

== Notable sites ==
=== Old Capitol ===
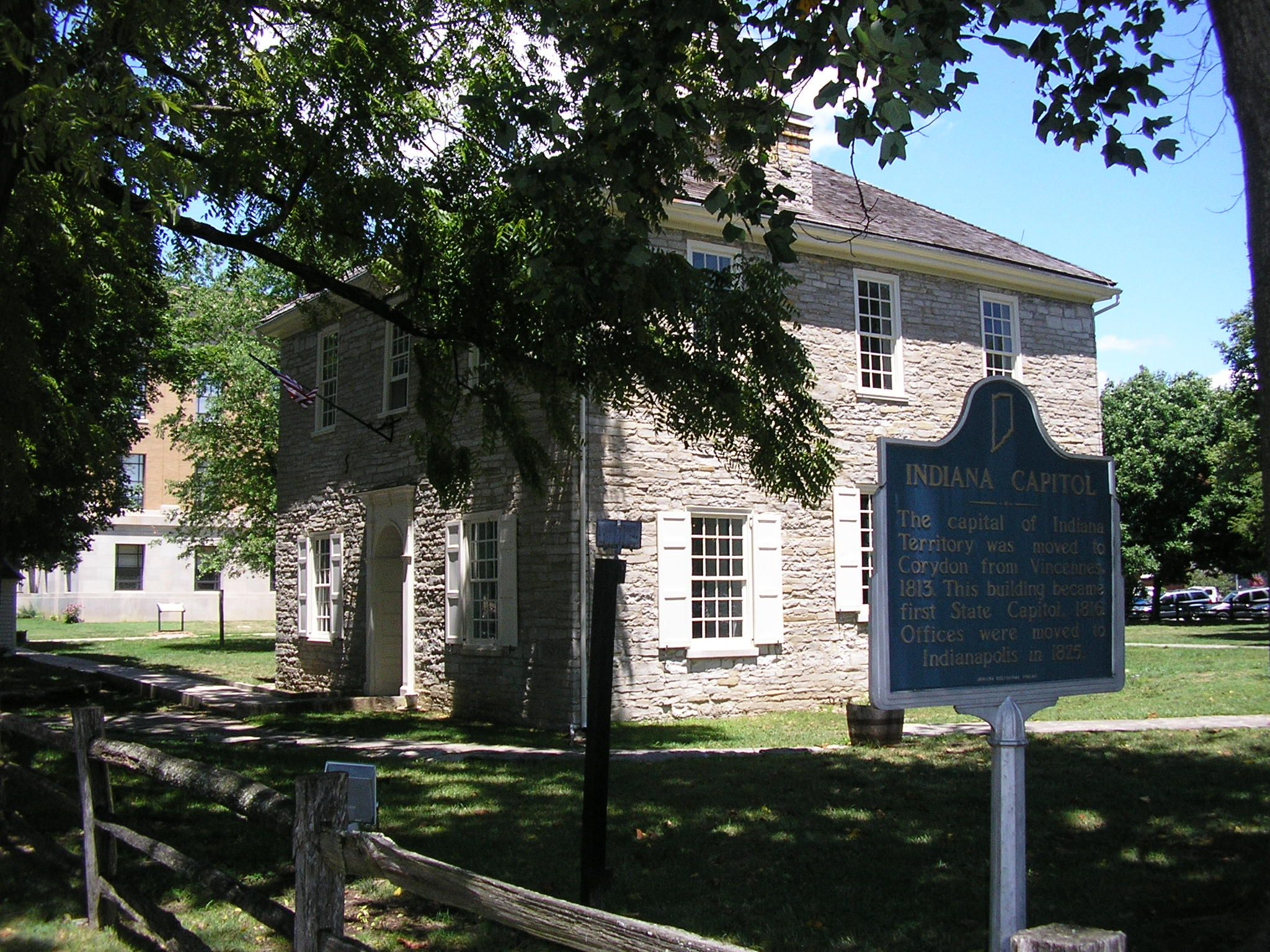
Old Capitol Building in downtown Corydon.

The Old Capitol building, a part of the Corydon Capitol State Historic Site, is administered by the Indiana State Museum and Historic Sites. The two-story, Federal-style, limestone building served as Indiana's first state capitol from 1816 until 1825. The building was originally intended to serve as the Harrison County Courthouse. Construction began in 1814, when Corydon was the capital of the Indiana Territory. The building was nearly completed in 1816, the year that Indiana was granted statehood and its first state legislature convened at Corydon. The building was primarily used as an assembly building for the territorial and state legislatures, but the county government and district courts occasionally used it when the Indiana General Assembly was not in session. Dennis Pennington, who became the state's first speaker of the Indiana Senate after statehood in 1816, supervised its construction.

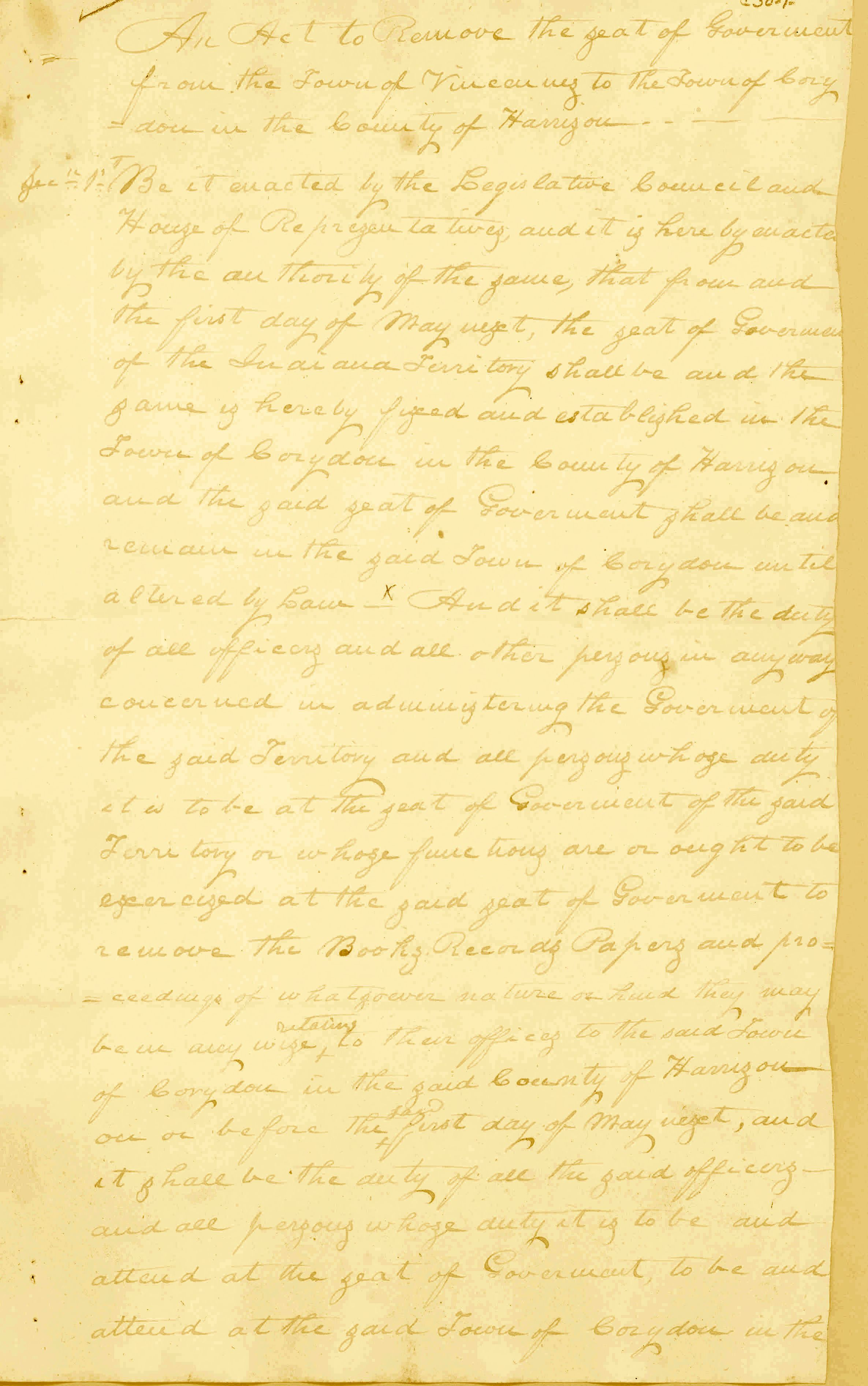
The first page of the 1813 State Capital Act, which moved the capital to Corydon.

The two-story building is 40 feet (12 m) square with walls 2.5 feet (0.76 m) thick. The exposed exterior of the building is not dressed, using only stones that were cut roughly square. The foundation, dug 3 feet (0.91 m) into the ground, is also 2.5 feet (0.76 m) thick. The lower level has 15-foot (4.6 m) ceilings, flagstone floors, and a barn rail made from hewn timber. The upper floor's ceiling is 10 feet (3.0 m) tall. The original building had a scale and balance on the roof as the symbol of justice, but they were removed in 1833 and replaced with a large bell. The construction cost of the original building was approximately $3,000. Two large chimneys that accommodated the four fireplaces installed in both the upper and lower levels were closed up during later renovations. A wood floor covered the original flagstone floor.

When Corydon became the state capital of Indiana in 1816, the Old Capitol building served as the seat of state government. The Indiana Supreme Court and the Indiana Senate were located on the upper level; the Indiana House of Representatives met on the first floor. After 1825, when the state capital was moved to Indianapolis, the Old Captol building continued to be used as the Harrison County Courthouse and county government office building until 1929, when a new county courthouse was completed.

In 1917, the State of Indiana purchased the Old Capitol building with the intention of preserving it. The restored building opened in 1929 and has since been preserved and protected as a memorial. The Old Capitol, sometimes referred to as the Corydon Capitol, was included within the original boundaries of the Corydon Historic District when it was listed on the National Register in 1973. The building has been restored as closely as possible to its original appearance, including furniture and paint colors. In 2015, a major restoration project was completed on the town square to protect the Old Capitol building from water damage, to update the electrical system and landscaping, and to install new walkways.

=== First state office building ===
The first state office building, which dates from 1817, is also known as the Old Treasury Building. It housed state government offices, including the first state auditor's and treasurer's offices. The building was included in the initial historic district designation. It is located on Walnut Street, east of Governor Hendricks's Headquarters. The Indiana State Museum and Historic Sites Corporation began a major rehabilitation of this building in 2008.

=== Governor Hendricks's Headquarters ===
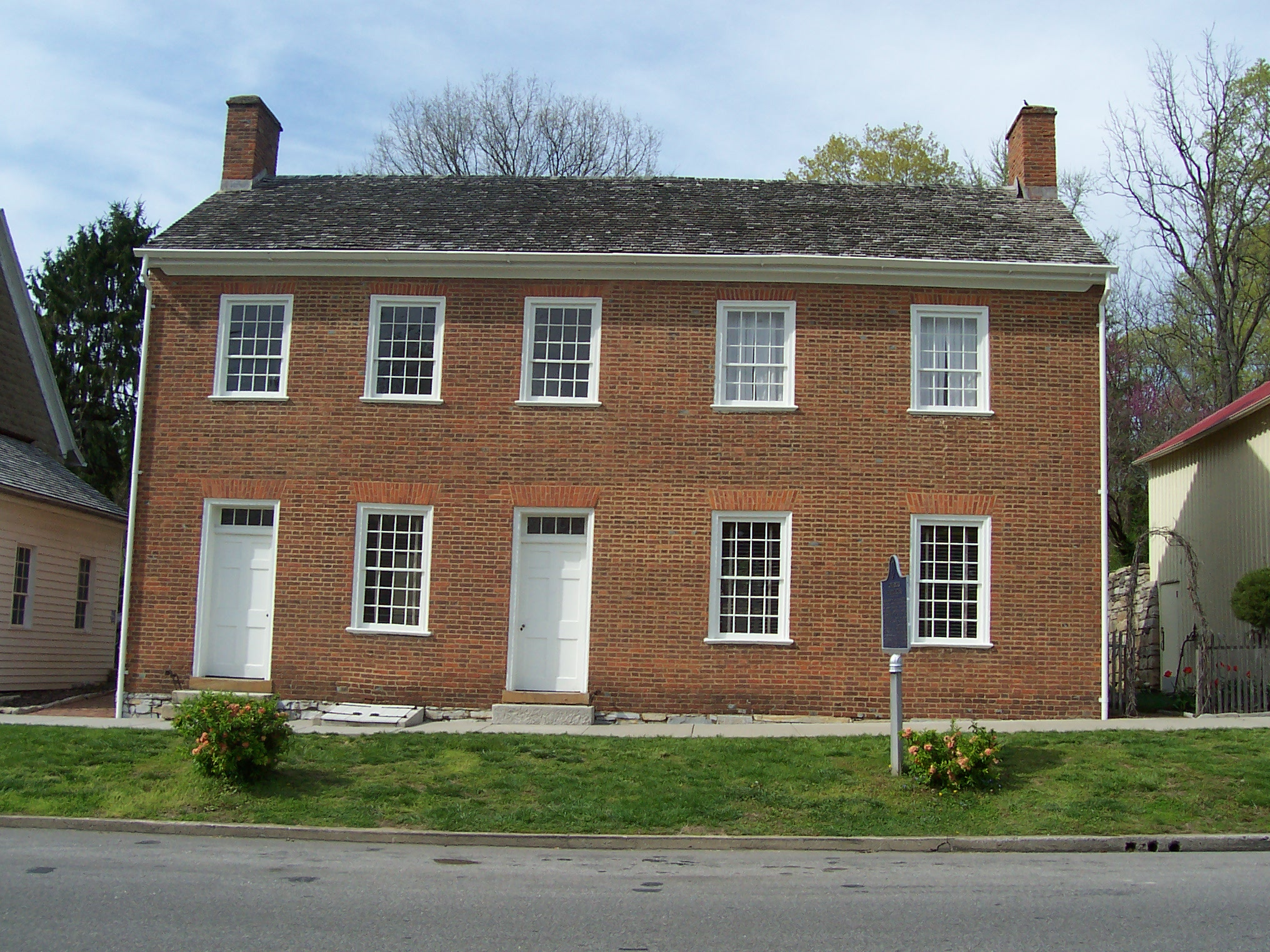
Governor's Headquarters, built in 1817, was home of Davis Floyd and later of William Hendricks.

Governor Hendricks's Headquarters is also part of the Corydon Capitol State Historic Site. Davis Floyd, a former treasurer and auditor of the Indiana Territory and a delegate to the constitutional convention in 1816, built the residence in 1817, when he was an Indiana state legislator. After Floyd lost the home during the financial Panic of 1819, the state government purchased it to house the Indiana's governor. It opened as a state historic site in 1979.

William Hendricks occupied the building from 1822 to 1825, when he was governor of Indiana. Hendricks was Indiana's first state representative to U.S. House of Representatives in 1816 and later served in the U.S. Senate. William A. Porter, a lawyer, judge, and politician, purchased the building in 1841. Judge Porter served in the Indiana legislature was speaker of Indiana House in 1847–48.

=== Constitution Elm Memorial ===
The Constitution Elm commemorates the first state constitutional convention that was held from June 10 to 29, 1816, when forty-three delegates convened at Corydon to discuss statehood for the territory and draft a state constitution for Indiana. The cramped conditions of the log cabin in which the constitution convention was held, along with the summer heat, caused the delegates to gather outdoors under the branches of a nearby elm tree, which was later memorialized as the Constitution Elm. It has been estimated that the giant elm was 50 feet (15 m) tall with a trunk that measured 5 feet (1.5 m) across and branches that spread more than 132 feet (40 m). Dutch elm disease destroyed the tree in 1925; however, the trunk has been preserved. It is protected by a sandstone memorial.

=== Posey House ===
The Posey home was included in the district's original National Register designation in 1973. Allan D. Thom and Thomas Lloyd Posey were the original owners of the home when its construction began in 1817. Colonel Posey was the son of Thomas Posey, governor of the Indiana Territory from 1813 to 1816. Colonel Posey, who was active in Harrison County's civic affairs, served as the county treasurer (1818–24) and was appointed adjutant general of Indiana in 1823. He used one room as his office and operated a dry-goods and cabinet shop in another portion of the house. Colonel Posey never married, but he raised fourteen orphans in the home.

The majority of the two-story brick home was built between 1817 and 1818. It was constructed in three stages: the main house; a wing used as offices, a store, and a cabinet shop; and a two-story ell at the rear of the home that housed a dining room, kitchen, pantry, smokehouse, and woodshed. Servant quarters were located on the ell's second floor. The rear of the property included woods and a spring, as well as several outbuildings. A portion of the home was later demolished.

The property passed through several owners until the Daughters of the American Revolution acquired it in 1925 and operated it as a local history museum through 1999. The Posey home was acquired by the State of Indiana in 2000, but it remained vacant until it was donated to the Historical Society of Harrison County in 2012.

=== Westfall House ===
The Westfall House, a log cabin located near the Constitution Elm, is the oldest extant building in Corydon. The home is privately owned and not open to the public.

=== Branham home/tavern ===
William Branham began operating a tavern on the site in 1809 in a structure originally built in 1800.

=== Kintner-McGrain House ===
Originally known as Cedar Glade, the Kintner-McGrain House was the home of Jacob Kintner, who built the Greek Revival-style residence in 1808 near Indian Creek. Kintner's heirs sold the property in 1849 to Thomas McGrain Sr.

=== Kintner House Hotel ===
The Kintner House Hotel, completed in 1873, originally had twenty-six rooms for guests on its upper floor. It was converted to apartments in the early twentieth century and was used for other commercial purposes until it was renovated into a bed and breakfast inn in 1986–87. The property, which is located within the district, was listed separately on the National Register in 1987.

=== Harrison County Courthouse ===
The three-story county Harrison County Courthouse, which is located next to the Old Capitol, was completed in 1929.

=== Grand Masonic Lodge ===
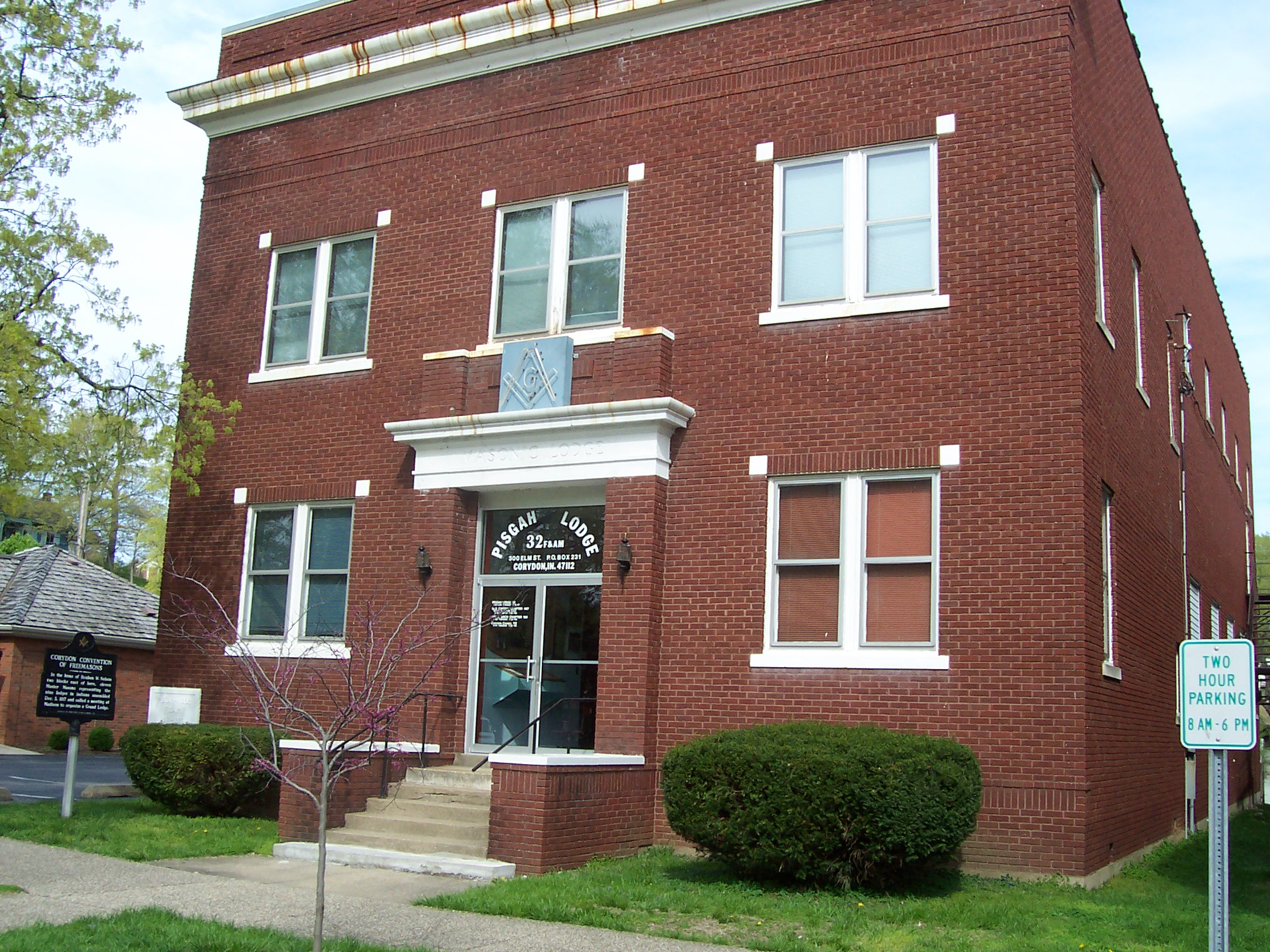
Grand Masonic Lodge

The Grand Masonic Lodge first organized in 1817 under the Grand Lodge of Kentucky; the Grand Lodge of Indiana organized in Madison in 1818. It is the oldest Masonic Lodge building in Indiana. Its founding members included State Senator Dennis Pennington; Indiana first governor Jonathan Jennings; State Representative Davis Floyd, and U.S. Congressman William Hendricks, among others. The present-day lodge building on Elm Street was erected in 1926. It is still used by Masons and the Order of the Eastern Star.

=== Leora Brown School ===
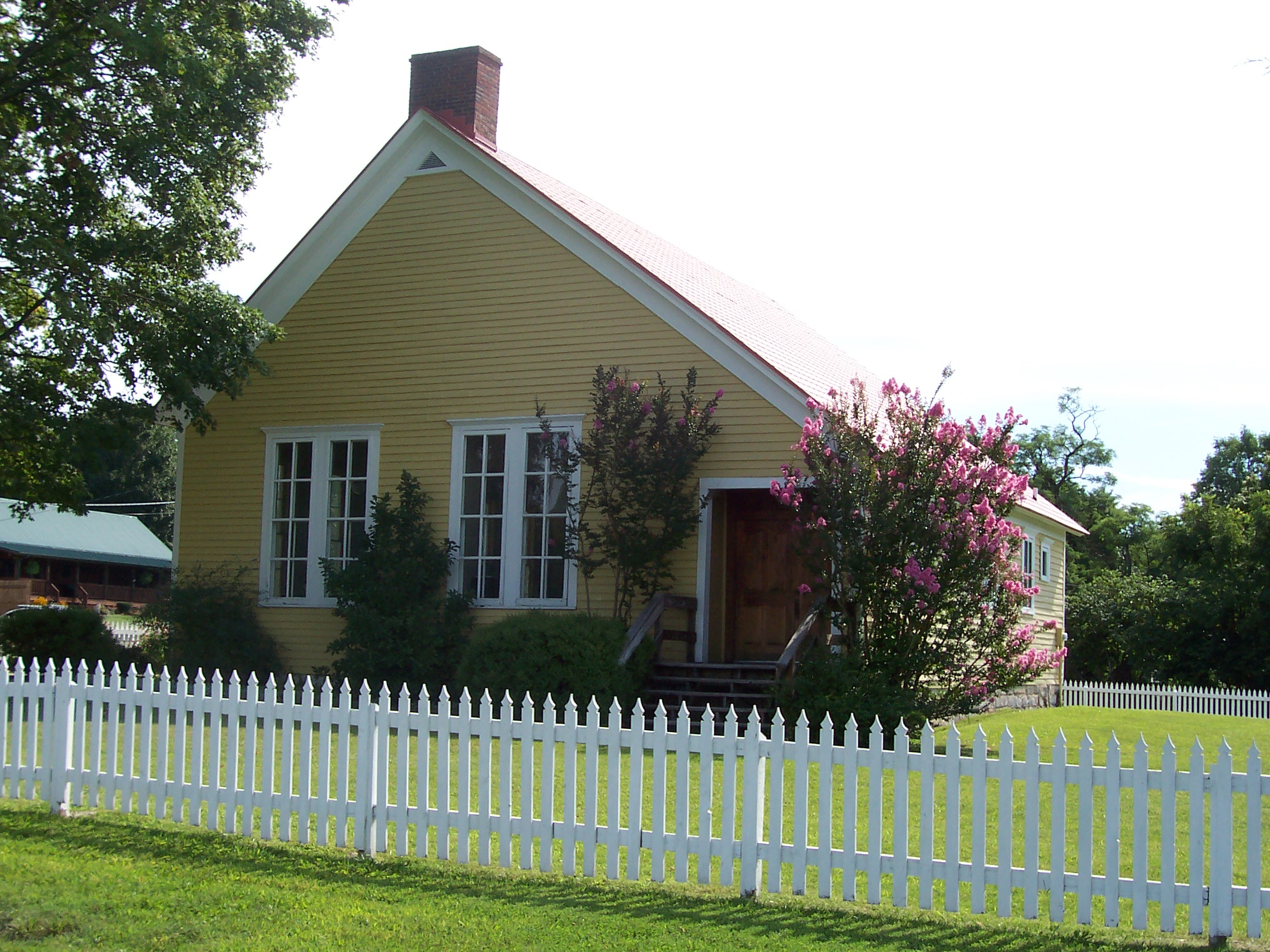
Leora Brown School

Construction on the school, which was originally known as the Corydon Colored School, began in 1891. It served as a primary and secondary school for the community's black students. The first graduation of high school students from the school occurred on May 14, 1897. In 1949, the Indiana General Assembly passed an act to desegregate Indiana's public schools by 1954. The Corydon Colored School closed in 1950, when the Corydon public schools were racially integrated, beginning in the 1950–51 school year. In 1987, the school was renamed for Leora Brown Farrow, the school's longest serving-teacher, who taught at school from 1924 until 1950.

The school is located at the corner of Summit and Hill Streets, a block east of the district's amended boundary line that was established as part of the National Register listing in 1989. Although the school was added to Indiana's Register of Historic Places in 1992 and is recognized with a state historical marker, it is not listed as a separate property in the National Register as of 2016. The building was converted to a cultural center in 1993.

== Gallery ==
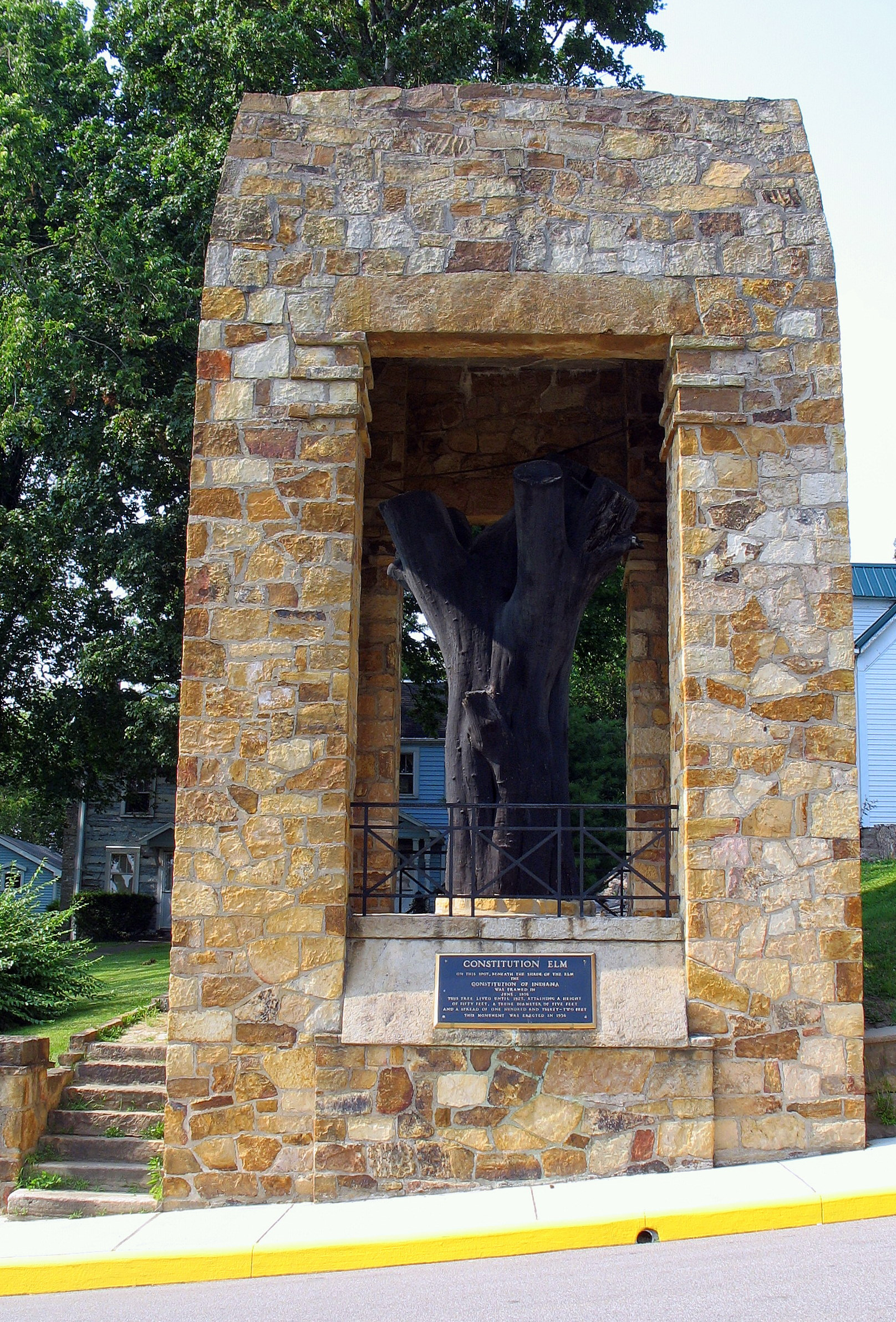
The Constitution Elm in 2006

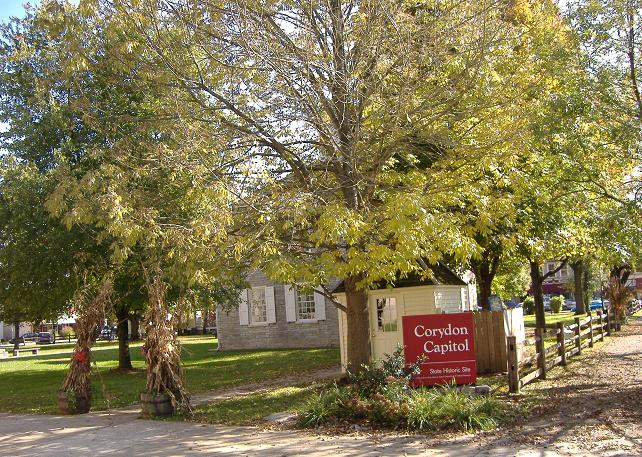
North side of Old State Capitol

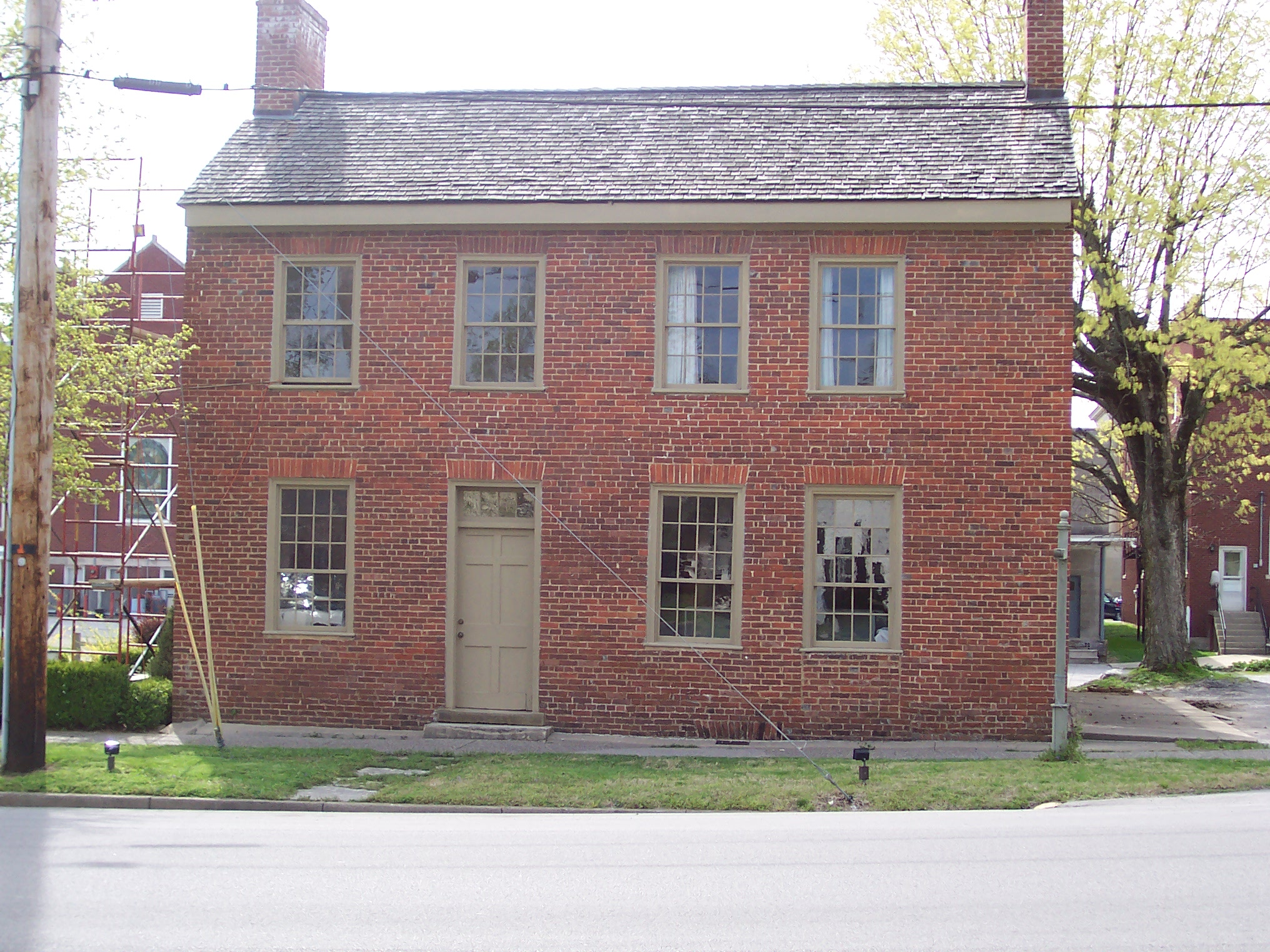
Heth House

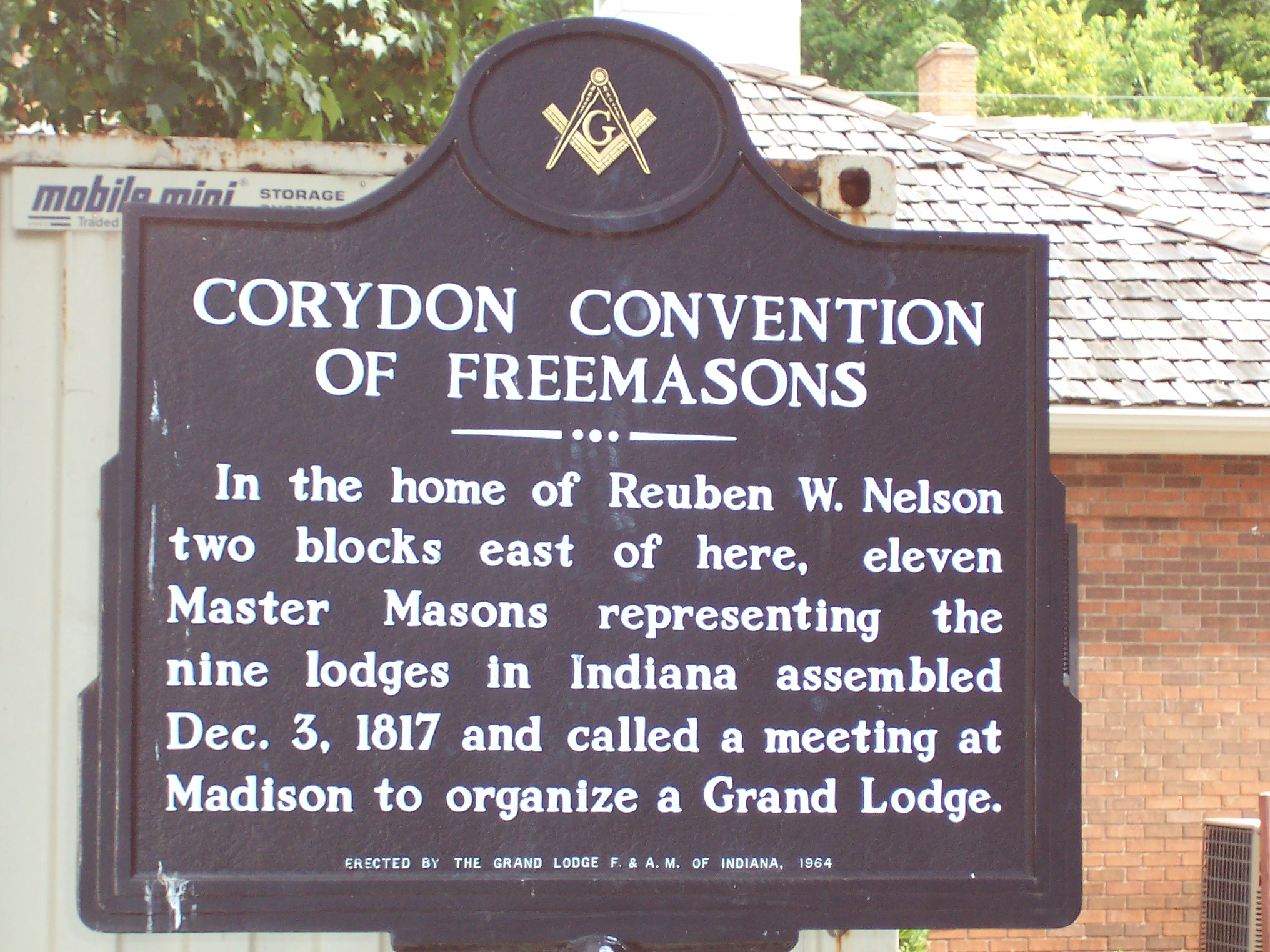
Grand Masonic Lodge historical marker

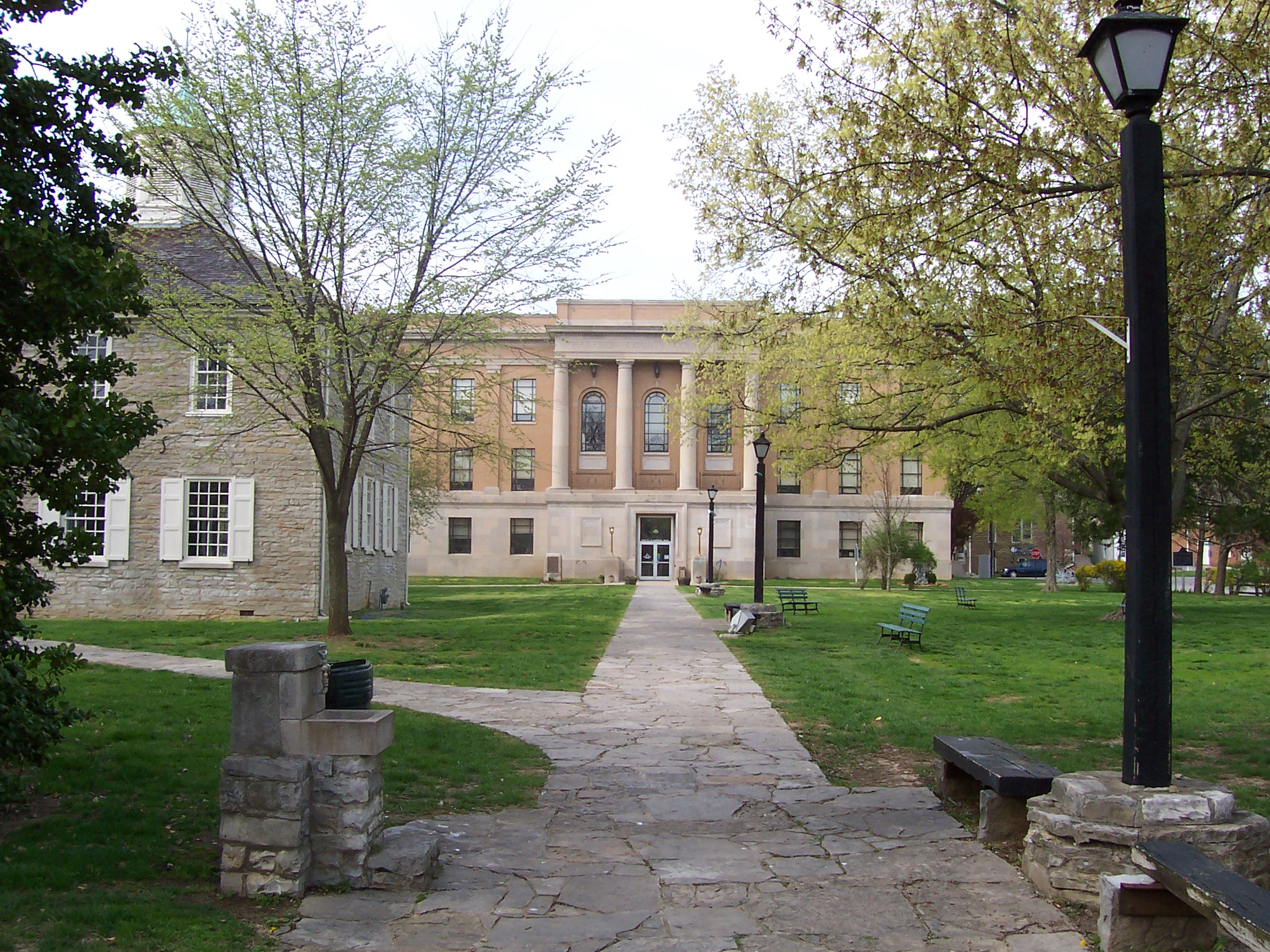
A view of the town square looking northward

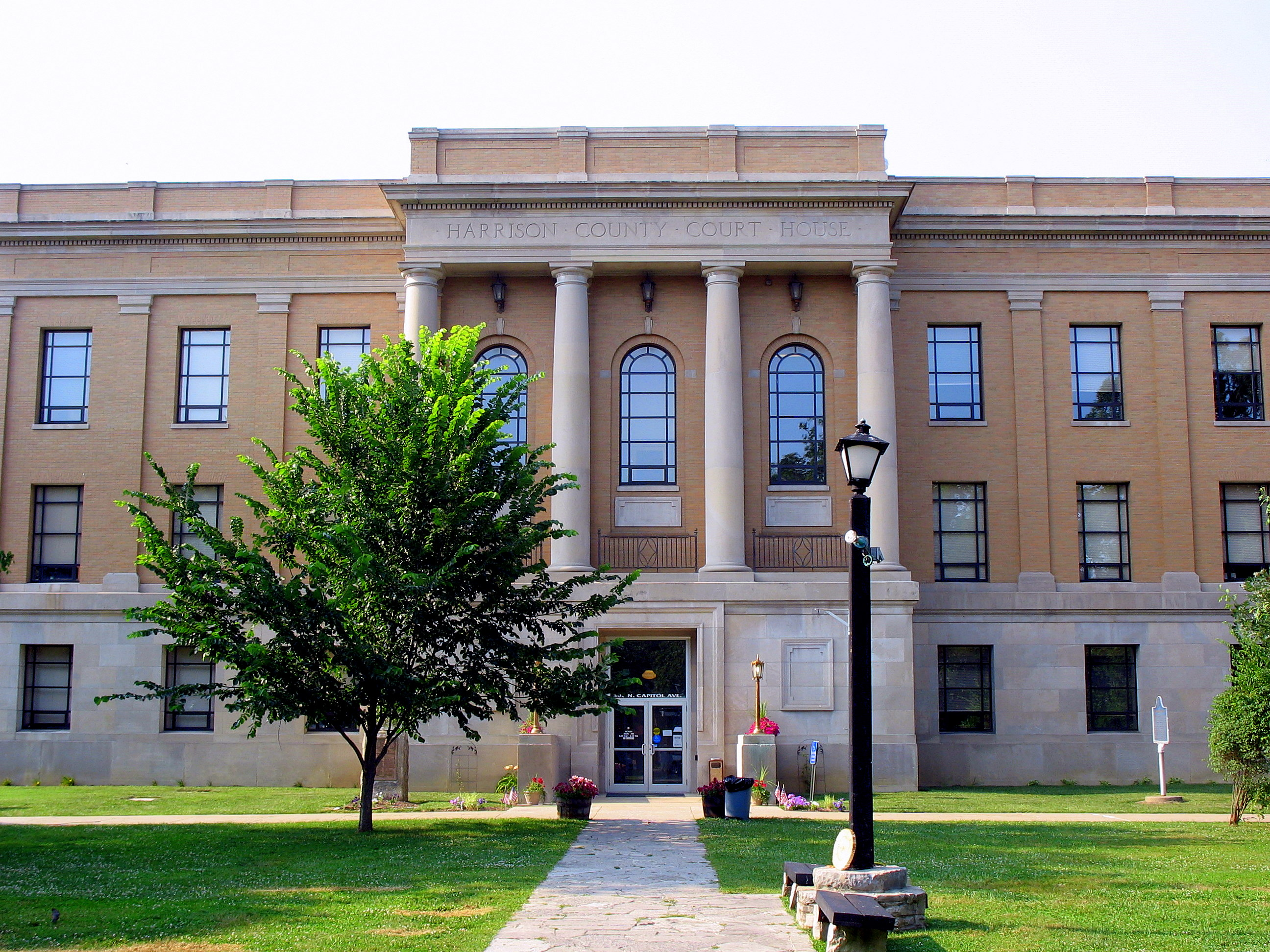
Harrison County Courthouse built in 1929.

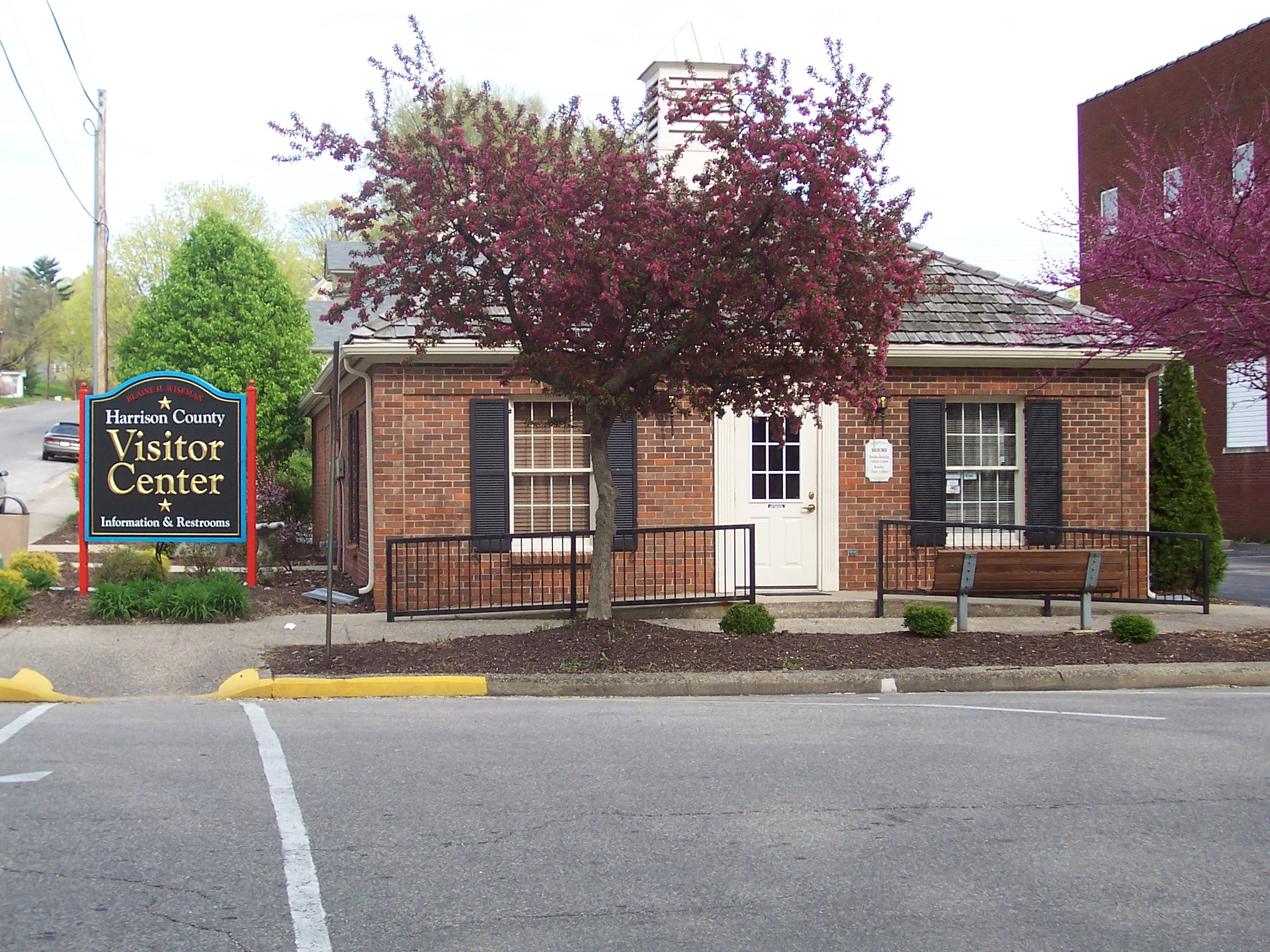
The Visitors Center

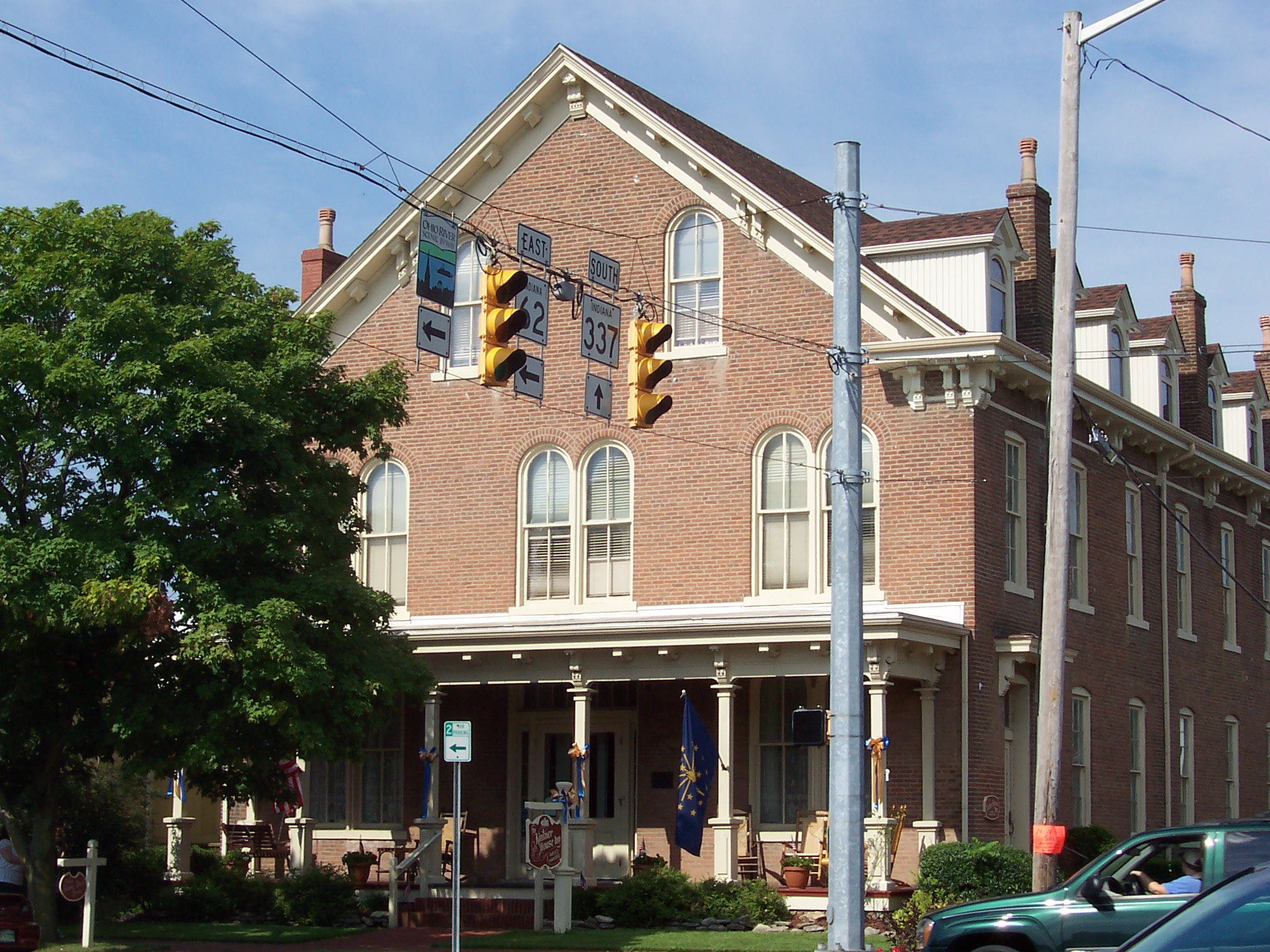
The Kintner Inn

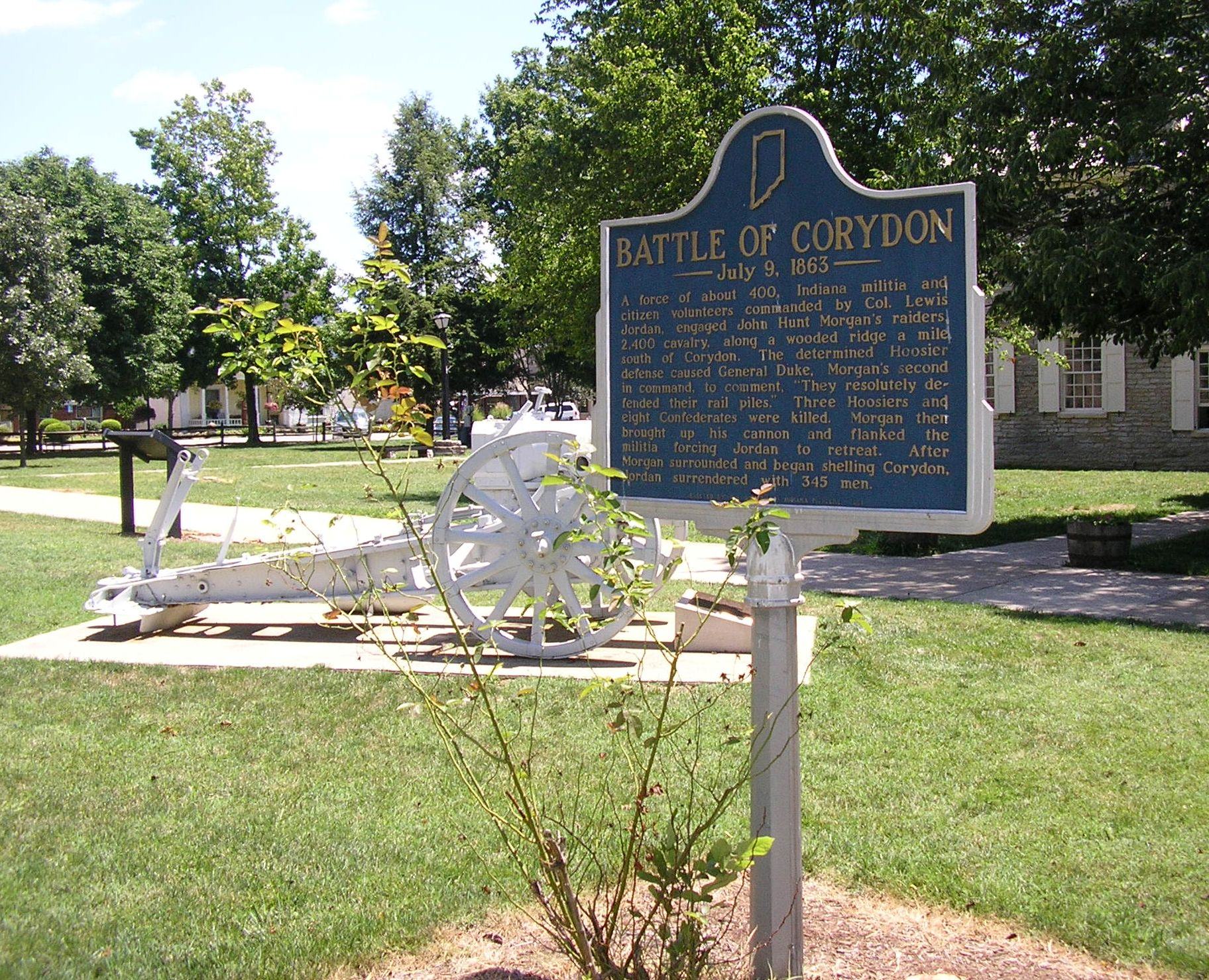
Battle of Corydon historical marker

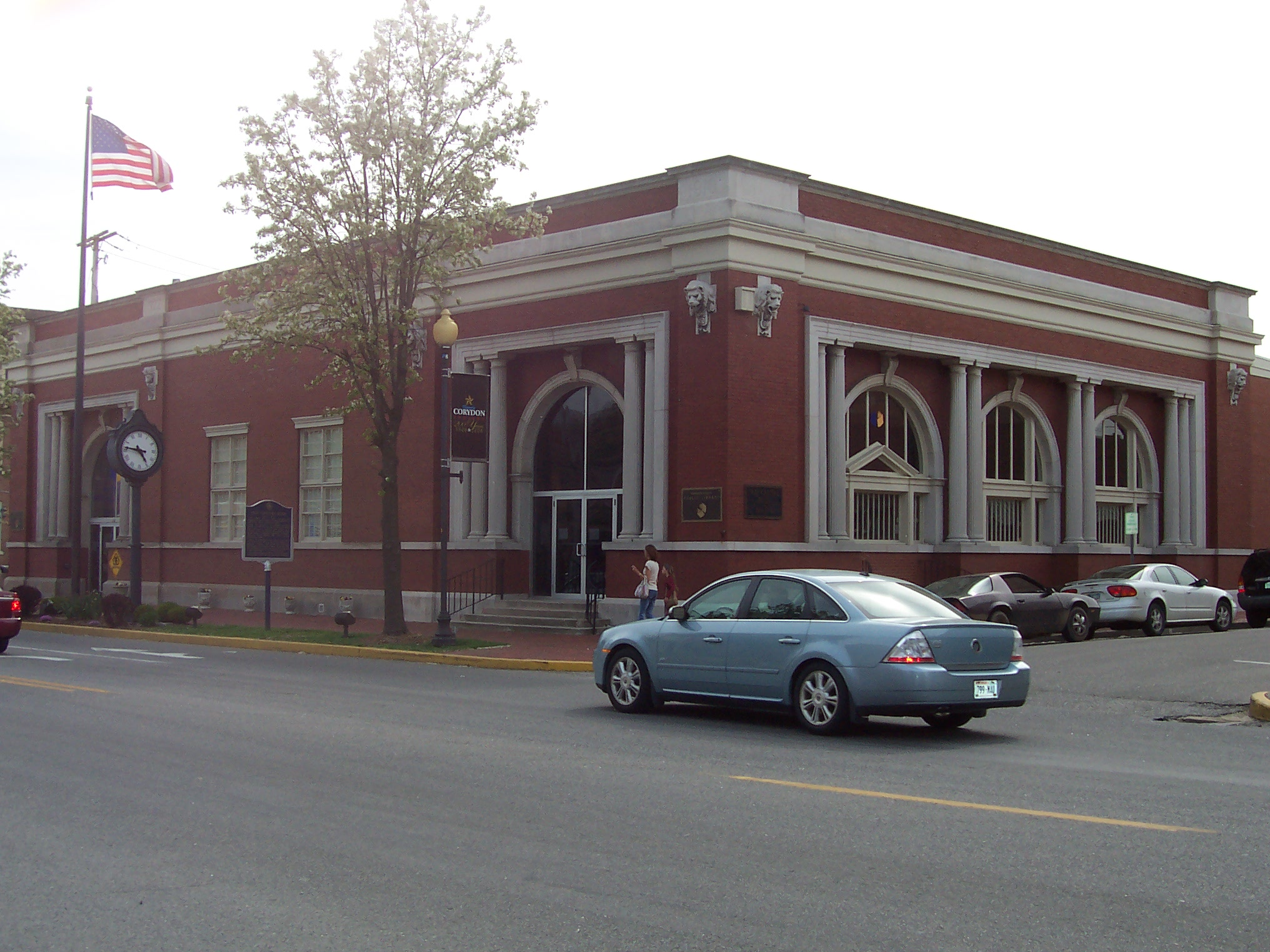
Old Capitol Bank, now the Harrison County Public Library

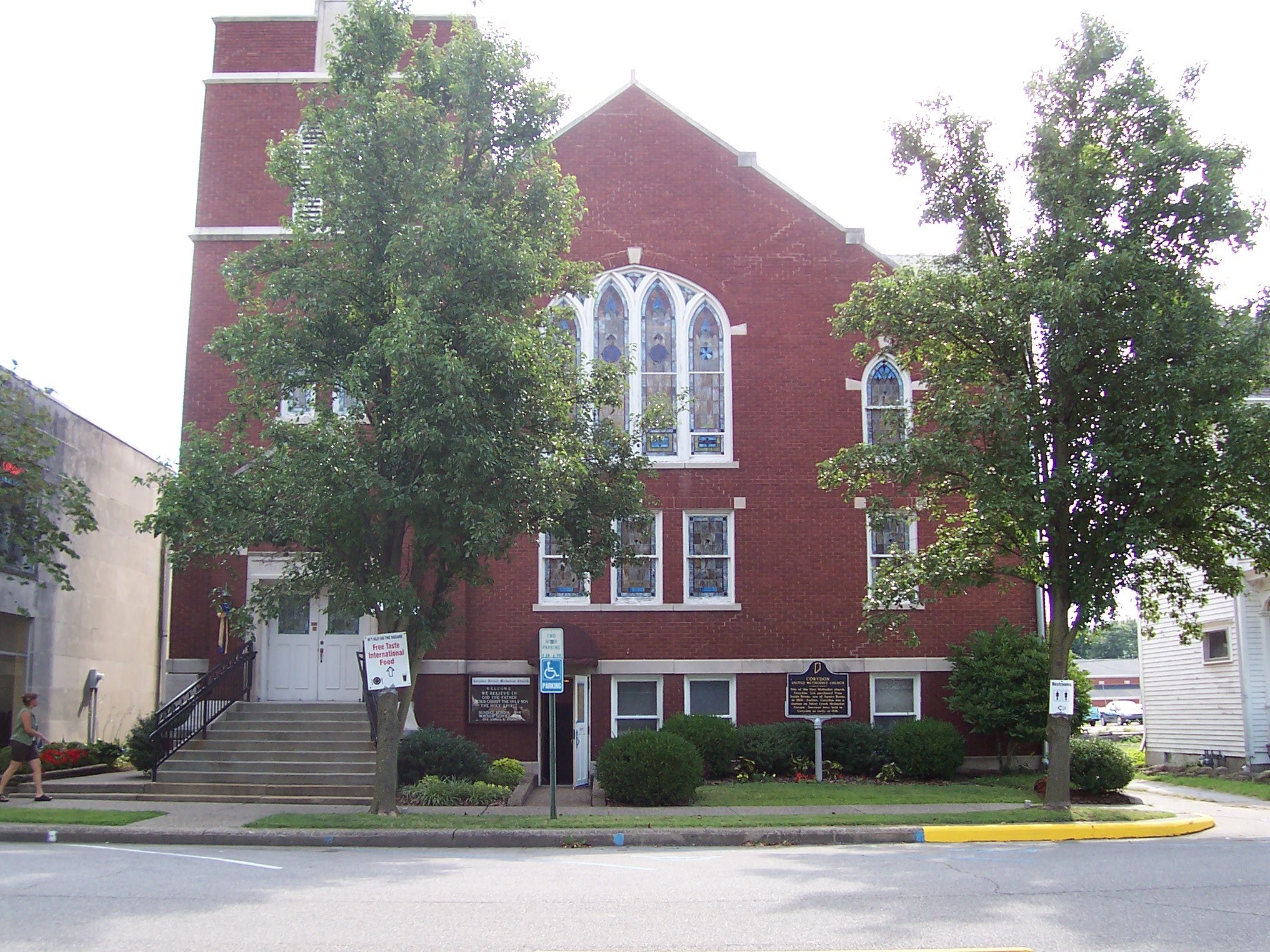
First Methodist Church

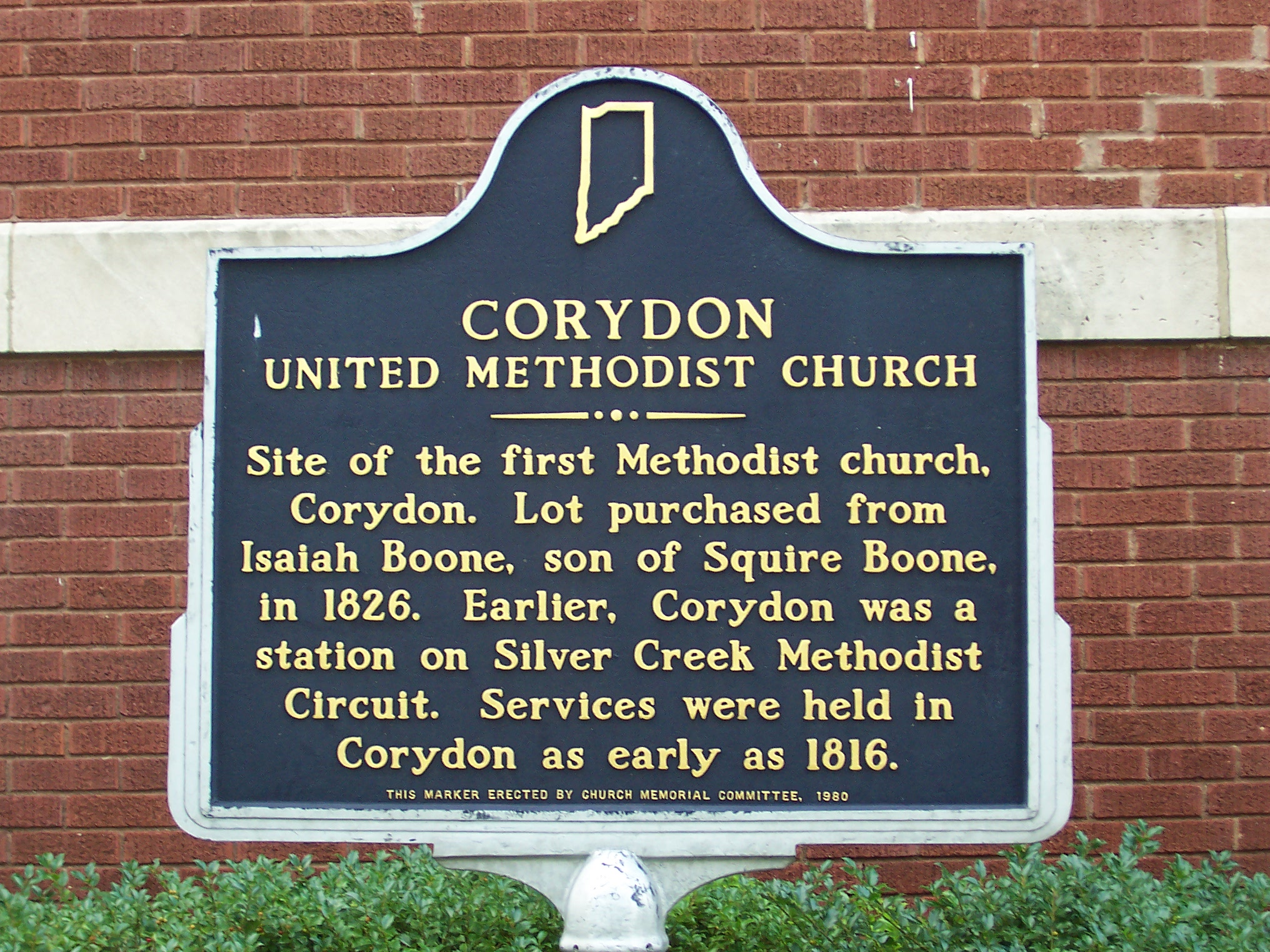
First Methodist Church historical marker

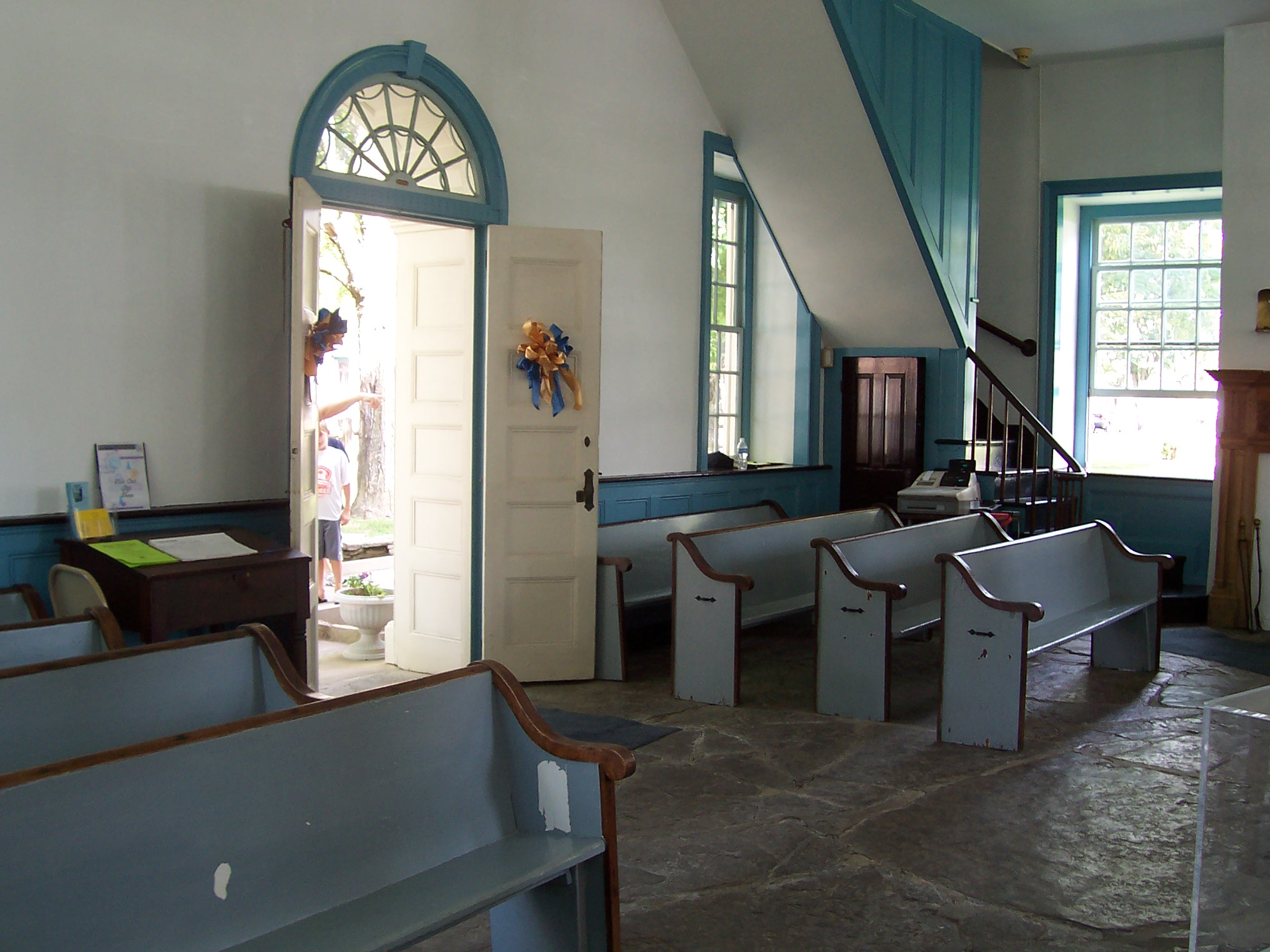
The public gallery in the Hall of Representatives

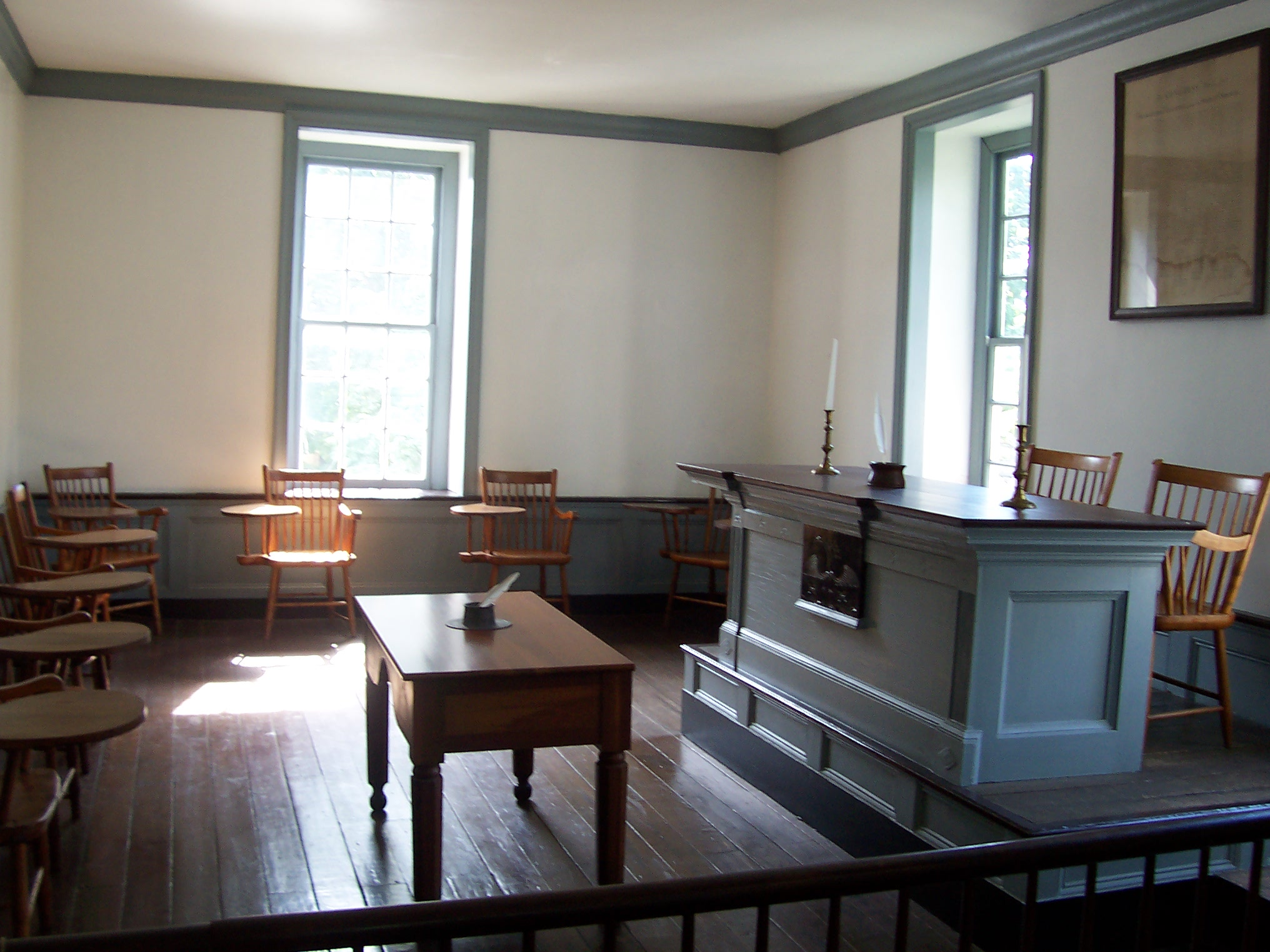
Senate Chamber

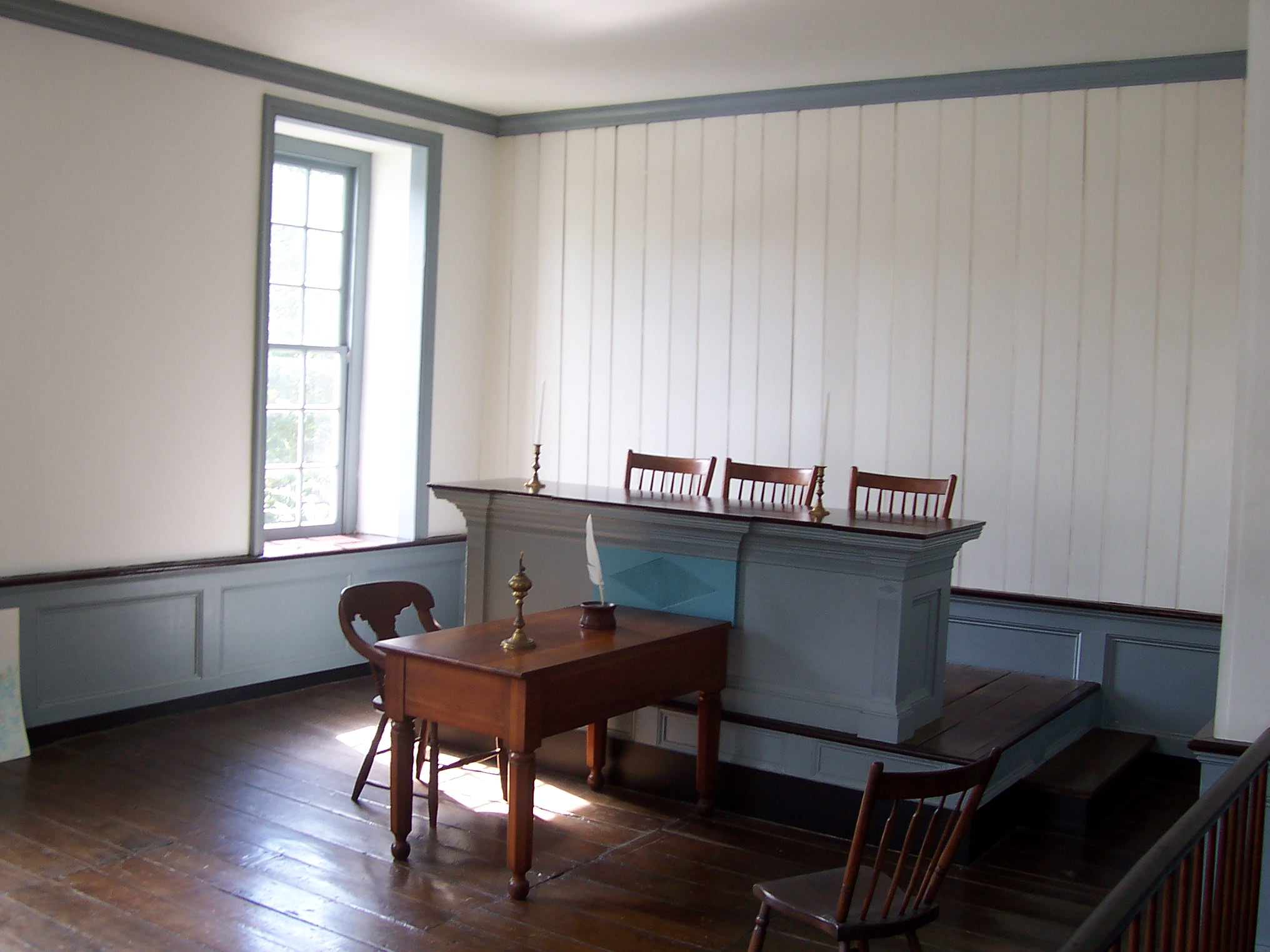
Supreme Court Chamber

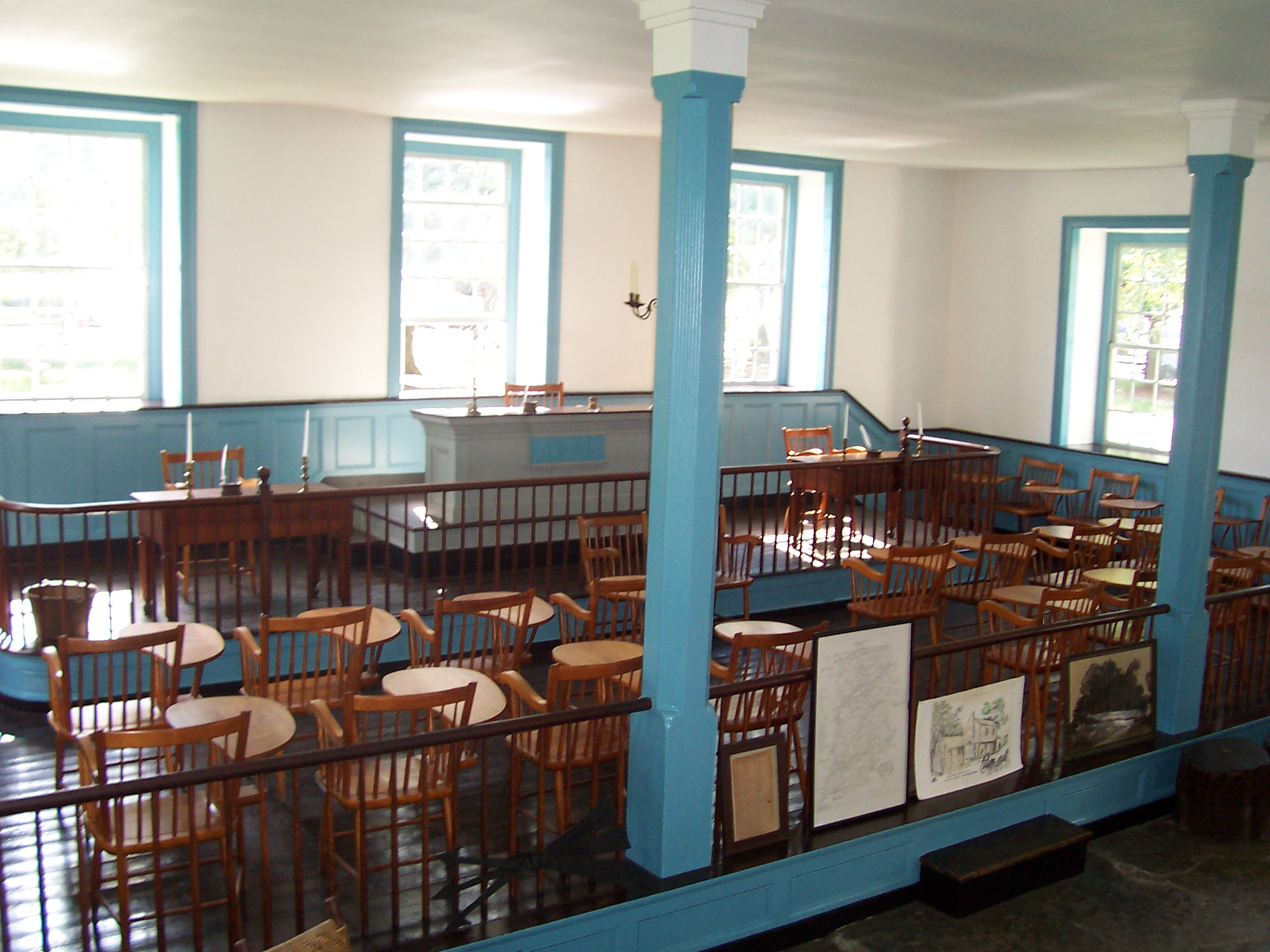
Hall of Representatives

== See also ==
- List of attractions and events in the Louisville metropolitan area
- National Register of Historic Places listings in Harrison County, Indiana
- Paul and Susannah Mitchem immigrated to Harrison County with 107 slaves, most of whom settled in Corydon
