= Reubin Field =

Reubin Field (c. 1771 – 1822) was a woodsman and skilled hunter. With his brother Joseph, he was a member of the Lewis and Clark Expedition, as one of the "nine young men from Kentucky" and one of the first to be recruited in August 1803. Both were mentioned many times in the journals of Lewis and Clark. The Field Brothers were also some of the best hunters on the expedition

Field was born on Naylor Branch, near Owingsville. (US indexed County Land Ownership Maps 1860–1918). Wyoming Precinct No.2)

He married Mary Myrtle in Indiana in 1807, but they had no children. They became farmers in Jefferson County, Kentucky (present-day Louisville Metro). He then later died after April 22, 1822.
