= Joseph Field =

Joseph Field (1772–1807) was born in 1772 in Culpeper County, Virginia. His younger brother Reubin was born in 1774. They were born and raised in Virginia until they moved at an early age to Kentucky and were considered to be part of the "nine young men from Kentucky" in the Lewis and Clark Expedition which they joined on August 1, 1803. Both men were known as fine woodsmen and hunters. The brothers returned to Kentucky in 1806. Joseph is thought to have died sometime between June 27 and October 20, 1807.

For a brief period, Joseph Field was employed by the Bullitt's Lick salt business, and because of this expertise, he was able to support the expedition.
