= John Dame =

Private John Dame (c. 1784–?) was a member of the Lewis and Clark Expedition. Born in about 1784 at Pallingham, New Hampshire, he was five feet nine inches in height and had blue eyes, light hair, and a fair complexion. He was recruited from Captain Amos Stoddard's Company at Kaskaskia, Illinois. He was mentioned in the journals because he killed a pelican on August 7 while en route up the Missouri River.
