= John Newman (explorer) =

Member of the Lewis and Clark Expedition

Private John Newman (c. 1785 – 1838) was a member of the Lewis and Clark Expedition. He was born in Pennsylvania and was a member of Captain Daniel Bissell's company of the First Infantry Regiment. During the expedition in October 1804, he ran into disciplinary problems and was confined for "having uttered repeated expressions of a highly criminal and mutinous nature." No records remain of the exact nature of his offense. He received a court-martial, and was sentenced to seventy-five lashes. In addition, he was removed from the expedition; however, since they were en route through the wilderness, he continued to travel with them to Fort Mandan. He performed hard labor and tried to redeem himself in the eyes of the two captains, but was sent back east with the return party in April 1805. After the expedition Lewis recommended that Congress grant Newman his pay for his period of service up to his expulsion; he received some pay and a land warrant as a member of the expedition. He settled in Missouri and was married at least once but appears to have had no children. In the 1830s he did some trapping in the Dakotas; he was killed by the Yankton Sioux in 1838.
