= Tornado outbreak of March 10–12, 1986 =

Weather event in the United States

Meteorological history
- Duration: March 10–12, 1986

Tornado outbreak
- Tornadoes: 41 confirmed
- Max. rating: F3 tornado
- Duration: 3 days

Overall effects
- Fatalities: 6
- Injuries: 122
- Damage: ≥$25 million (1986 USD)
- Areas affected: Central, Eastern United States and Southern United States

The tornado outbreak of March 10–12, 1986 was a significant and widespread tornado outbreak which produced a high-end F2 tornado which struck Lexington, Kentucky and killing a total of 6 people. Other tornadoes struck in Alabama, Indiana, and Ohio. One tornado rated F4 in Meridian, Mississippi resulted in no fatalities.

== Confirmed tornadoes ==
=== March 10 event ===
Confirmed tornadoes by Fujita rating
FU	F0	F1	F2	F3	F4	F5	Total
0	4	9	12	2	0	0	41

List of confirmed tornadoes – March 10–12, 1986 (Note: All dates are based on the local time zone where the tornado touched down; however, all times are in Coordinated Universal Time for consistency.)
F#	Location	County / Parish	State	Date	Start Coord.	Time (UTC)	Path length	Max width	Summary
F3	SE of Paragon to SW of Fountaintown	Morgan, Johnson, Marion, Shelby	IN	March 10	39.37°N 86.52°W	18:28	35 mi (56 km)	440 yd (400 m)	A large, long-tracked tornado touched down near the town of Paragon, southwest of Indianapolis. 22 people were injured.
F1	SW of Indianapolis	Marion	IN	March 10	39.73°N 86.23°W	18:55	2.5 mi (4.0 km)	220 yd (200 m)	A weak but destructive tornado touched down in the Indianapolis suburb of Mars Hill, causing $500,000 in damage to houses and roofs before lifting.
F2 (Note: It would appear that both this and the next tornado both spawned on the same coordinates, but that makes no sense. It is what appears on the THP table, however.)	NW of Boggstown to E of New Palestine	Shelby, Hancock	IN	March 10	39.57°N 85.93°W	19:10	10 mi (16 km)	300 yd (270 m)	This strong tornado caused severe damage to suburbs southeast of Indianapolis. However, there were no casualties, though damage ranges between $500,000 and $5,000,000.
F2	NW of Boggstown to E of Greenfield	Shelby, Hancock	IN	March 10	39.57°N 85.93°W	19:10	17.8 mi (28.6 km)	150 yd (140 m)	1 death – A strong tornado spawned on nearly the same spot as the previous one, before continuing into Hancock, ultimately dissipating east of Greenfield. Damage estimates of around $500,000 and $5,000,000 occurred, and one additional person was injured.
F1	Greenfield area	Hancock	IN	March 10	39.81°N 85.78°W	19:10	5 mi (8.0 km)	220 yd (200 m)	This short-lived tornado caused some damage in rural areas near Greenfield.
F2	SW of Little York to NE of Austin	Washington, Scott	IN	March 10	39.81°N 85.78°W	20:10	12 mi (19 km)	300 yd (270 m)	This destructive tornado caused severe damage in and around the towns of Little York and Austin. Nobody was killed, though 25 people were injured.
F2	SE of Maud	Butler	OH	March 10	39.35°N 84.38°W	20:20	1 mi (1.6 km)	200 yd (180 m)	This short lived but strong tornado caused substantial damage in the outskirt neighborhood of Cincinnati, Maud. However, no injuries or fatalities occurred.
F1	St. Henry to NE of Neptune	Mercer	OH	March 10	40.42°N 84.63°W	20:20	14 mi (23 km)	73 yd (67 m)	Multiple trees were snapped along rural areas in Mercer County.
F2	SSE of Spiceland to S of New Castle	Henry	IN	March 10	39.82°N 85.43°W	20:40	4 mi (6.4 km)	300 yd (270 m)	Multiple homes and trees were severely damages by this large, strong tornado.
F3	SSW of Lynn to NNW of Bartonia	Randolph	IN	March 10	40.03°N 84.98°W	20:55	7.6 mi (12.2 km)	440 yd (400 m)	This destructive, intense tornado caused considerable damage to multiple homes in the town of Lynn. Despite the damage, however, no injuries were reported.
F1	NNW of Fredericktown	Nelson	KY	March 10	37.77°N 85.38°E	21:00	0.1 mi (0.16 km)	10 yd (9.1 m)	Multiple tree branches were snapped.
F2	Wilmington to SSW of Bloomington	Clinton	OH	March 10	39.45°N 83.83°W	21:08	6 mi (9.7 km)	73 yd (67 m)	A tornado formed directly on the town of Wilmington, causing severe damage, and injuring 10 people.
F1	SW of Kenton to NE of Grant	Hardin	OH	March 10	40.63°N 83.63°W	21:20	6 mi (9.7 km)	73 yd (67 m)	This tornado passed directly over Kenton, resulting in damage to roofs and mobile homes.
F2	SSE of Sabina to NE of Mount Sterling	Fayette, Madison, Pickaway	OH	March 10	39.48°N 83.57°W	21:25	28 mi (45 km)	100 yd (91 m)	1 death – A long-tracked, strong tornado touched down over open land near Sabina before progressing into Madison, and Pickaway counties. 10 people were injured.
F1	NW of Wyandot to NE of Nevada	Wyandot, Crawford	OH	March 10	40.75°N 83.13°W	21:45	5 mi (8.0 km)	73 yd (67 m)	Multiple outbuildings were destroyed, alongside trees and power lines along the path.
F0	Moss Beach	San Mateo	CA	March 10	37.52°N 122.52°W	21:45	0.2 mi (0.32 km)	50 yd (46 m)	A rare Californian waterspout was spotted over near Moss Beach. No damage occurred.
F2	Lexington	Fayette	KY	March 10	38.03°N 84.52°W	21:50	3.5 mi (5.6 km)	100 yd (91 m)	This strong tornado tore directly through the center of Lexington, causing severe damage. After striking the University of Kentucky campus, it passed just south of downtown, before disspiating in neighbourhood of Eastside, near Cramer Ave. 20 people were injured.
F2	Ripley to SE of Russellville	Brown	OH	March 10	38.73°N 83.83°W	21:54	6 mi (9.7 km)	143 yd (131 m)	F2 damage occurred directly in Ripley, as this tornado formed close to the Ohio River banks. No injuries were reported.
F2	E of Willard to NW of Olena	Huron	OH	March 10	41.05°N 82.68°W	22:03	8 mi (13 km)	200 yd (180 m)	1 death – A strong tornado traversed through Huron. 10 additional people were injured.
F2	SSW of Norwich to SE of Bloomfield	Muskingum	OH	March 10	39.97°N 81.83°W	23:45	5 mi (8.0 km)	100 yd (91 m)	1 death – Severe damage occurred in northwestern portions of Norwich, causing one death and 3 injuries.
F0	S of Morton Valley	Eastland	TX	March 11	32.45°N 98.82°W	20:20	0.5 mi (0.80 km)	30 yd (27 m)	A brief tornado was observed over a field.
F0	NNW of Breckenridge	Stephens	TX	March 11	32.45°N 98.82°W	20:30	1 mi (1.6 km)	30 yd (27 m)	A brief tornado touched down east of the Hubbard Creek Reservoir. No known damage occurred.
F1	W of Rubottom	Love	OK	March 11	33.93°N 97.53°W	21:55	1 mi (1.6 km)	30 yd (27 m)	Some tree damage occurred.
F2	SSW of Weatherford to SE of Poolville	Parker	TX	March 11	32.77°N 97.87°W	22:08	9 mi (14 km)	40 yd (37 m)	This strong tornado passed close to the town of Weatherford, causing severe damage to farms near town.
F1	Pineland	Sabine	TX	March 12	32.77°N 97.87°W	05:05	1 mi (1.6 km)	200 yd (180 m)	A brief tornado caused some damage in and around the town of Pineland.
F0	S of Cottage Grove	Henry	TN	March 12	36.32°N 88.48°W	06:10	0.3 mi (0.48 km)	17 yd (16 m)	Brief tornado caused no damage.
F1	E of Robinsonville	DeSoto	MS	March 12	36.32°N 88.48°W	07:30	1 mi (1.6 km)	30 yd (27 m)	Brief tornado caused sporadic tree damage.
