= Harristown =

Harristown may refer to:

== Australia ==
- Harristown, Queensland, a suburb of Toowoomba

== Ireland ==
- Harristown, Naas South, County Kildare
  - Harristown (Parliament of Ireland constituency), disestablished 1801
- Harristown (civil parish), West Offaly, County Kildare (in King's County until 1840)

== United States ==
- Harristown, Illinois, village in Macon County
  - Harristown Township, Macon County, Illinois
- Harristown, Indiana
