= Bartle =

Bartle may refer to:

- A surname of Cornish origin derived from Bottrell, in old form or Bottral. It originated from and is a corruption of Botteaux, which is a surname of Norman origin.
- The Bartle Test of Gamer Psychology which categorises players of multiplayer online games.
- R. v. Bartle, a key case in Canadian law.
- Bartle Bogle Hegarty, a British advertising agency.
- Bartle Hall Convention Center, a convention center in Kansas City, Missouri, United States
- Bartle, Indiana, an unincorporated community in the United States

== People with the surname Bartle ==
- Christopher Bartle (born 1952), British equestrian
- Harold Roe Bartle (1901–1974), American lawyer, banker, and politician
- Harvey Bartle III (born 1941), chief judge of the United States District Court for the Eastern District of Pennsylvania
- Jean Ashworth Bartle (born 1947), Canadian choral conductor and teacher
- Matt Bartle (born 1965), Republican politician from Missouri, USA
- Richard Bartle, namesake of the aforementioned Bartle Test of Gamer Psychology
- Robert G. Bartle (1927–2003), American mathematician and author

== People with the given name Bartle ==
- Bartle Bull (b. 1970), journalist and Middle East expert.
