= New Liberty, Indiana =

- Unincorporated community
- Washington County's location in Indiana

- Location in Washington County
- Coordinates: 38°34′05″N 85°52′02″W
- Country: United States
- State: Indiana
- County: Washington
- Township: Franklin
- Elevation: 820 ft (250 m)
- Time zone: UTC-5 (Eastern (EST))
  - Summer (DST): UTC-4 (EDT)
- ZIP code: 47126
- Area codes: 812, 930
- FIPS code: 18-53130
- GNIS feature ID: 440074

New Liberty is an unincorporated community in Franklin Township, Washington County, in the U.S. state of Indiana.

== Geography ==
New Liberty is located at 38°34′05″N 85°52′02″W.
