= Pumpkin Center, Indiana =

Pumpkin Center may be:

- Pumpkin Center, Orange County, Indiana
- Pumpkin Center, Washington County, Indiana
