= Sugar Creek Township, Shelby County, Indiana =

Sugar Creek Township
- Township
- Coordinates: 39°33′49″N 85°54′55″W
- Country: United States
- State: Indiana
- County: Shelby

Government
  - Type: Indiana township

Area
  - Total: 24.01 sq mi (62.2 km^{2})
  - Land: 23.9 sq mi (62 km^{2})
  - Water: 0.11 sq mi (0.28 km^{2})
- Elevation: 764 ft (233 m)

Population (2020)
  - Total: 1,085
  - Density: 45.4/sq mi (17.5/km^{2})
- FIPS code: 18-73952
- GNIS feature ID: 453885

Sugar Creek Township is one of fourteen townships in Shelby County, Indiana. As of the 2010 census, its population was 1,086 and it contained 412 housing units.

Sugar Creek Township was organized in 1840.

The community took its name from Sugar Creek, which flows southward in the area just west of the community.

== Geography ==
According to the 2010 census, the township has a total area of 24.01 square miles (62.2 km^{2}), of which 23.9 square miles (62 km^{2}) (or 99.54%) is land and 0.11 square miles (0.28 km^{2}) (or 0.46%) is water.

=== Unincorporated towns ===
- Boggstown

== Climate ==
The climate in this area is characterized by hot, humid summers and generally mild to cool winters. According to the Köppen Climate Classification system, Sugar Creek has a humid subtropical climate, abbreviated "Cfa" on climate maps.
