= Daisy Hill, Indiana =

- Unincorporated community
- Washington County's location in Indiana

- Location of Daisy Hill in Washington County
- Coordinates: 38°30′24″N 85°56′21″W
- Country: United States
- State: Indiana
- County: Washington
- Township: Polk
- Elevation: 791 ft (241 m)
- Time zone: UTC-5 (Eastern (EST))
  - Summer (DST): UTC-4 (EDT)
- ZIP code: 47165
- Area codes: 812, 930
- GNIS feature ID: 452098

Daisy Hill is an unincorporated community in Polk Township, Washington County, in the U.S. state of Indiana.

== History ==
According to tradition, Daisy Hill was so named on account of there being a cemetery near the town site.

Daisy Hill was mostly destroyed by an extremely powerful F5 tornado on April 3, 1974, during the 1974 Super Outbreak. F5 damage was done in the community, which was in the form of complete leveling and sweeping away of multiple homes.

Daisy Hill was struck again by another extremely powerful tornado on March 2, 2012, when a violent EF4 tornado plowed through the community, causing EF4 damage there.

== Geography ==
Daisy Hill is located at 38°30′24″N 85°56′21″W.
