= Posey Township, Washington County, Indiana =

Posey Township
- Township
- Location in Washington County
- Coordinates: 38°26′46″N 86°12′52″W
- Country: United States
- State: Indiana
- County: Washington

Government
  - Type: Indiana township

Area
  - Total: 33.82 sq mi (87.6 km^{2})
  - Land: 33.55 sq mi (86.9 km^{2})
  - Water: 0.27 sq mi (0.70 km^{2}) 0.80%
- Elevation: 659 ft (201 m)

Population (2020)
  - Total: 1,791
  - Density: 53.38/sq mi (20.61/km^{2})
- ZIP codes: 47120, 47125, 47145, 47164, 47165, 47167
- GNIS feature ID: 0453767

Posey Township is one of thirteen townships in Washington County, Indiana, United States. As of the 2020 census, its population was 1,791 and it contained 804 housing units.

Historical population
Census	Pop.	Note	%±
1890	1,324		—
1900	1,497		13.1%
1910	1,311		−12.4%
1920	1,156		−11.8%
1930	1,114		−3.6%
1940	1,205		8.2%
1950	1,149		−4.6%
1960	1,109		−3.5%
1970	1,258		13.4%
1980	1,525		21.2%
1990	1,480		−3.0%
2000	1,783		20.5%
2010	1,888		5.9%
2020	1,791		−5.1%
Source: US Decennial Census

== Geography ==
According to the 2010 census, the township has a total area of 33.82 square miles (87.6 km^{2}), of which 33.55 square miles (86.9 km^{2}) (or 99.20%) is land and 0.27 square miles (0.70 km^{2}) (or 0.80%) is water.

=== Cities, towns, villages ===
- Fredericksburg
- Hardinsburg

=== Unincorporated towns ===
- Fayetteville at 38.451726°N 86.262758°W

(This list is based on USGS data and may include former settlements.)

=== Adjacent townships ===
- Howard Township (northeast)
- Jackson Township (east)
- Morgan Township, Harrison County (southeast)
- Blue River Township, Harrison County (south)
- Whiskey Run Township, Crawford County (southwest)
- Southeast Township, Orange County (west)
- Madison Township (northwest)

=== Cemeteries ===
The township contains these two cemeteries: Old Unity and Walton.

=== Rivers ===
- Blue River

== School districts ==
- West Washington School Corporation

== Political districts ==
- Indiana's 9th congressional district
- State House District 73
- State Senate District 44
