= Brown Township, Washington County, Indiana =

Brown Township
- Township
- Location in Washington County
- Coordinates: 38°42′24″N 86°15′50″W
- Country: United States
- State: Indiana
- County: Washington

Government
  - Type: Indiana township

Area
  - Total: 30.93 sq mi (80.1 km^{2})
  - Land: 30.73 sq mi (79.6 km^{2})
  - Water: 0.2 sq mi (0.52 km^{2}) 0.65%
- Elevation: 705 ft (215 m)

Population (2020)
  - Total: 1,100
  - Density: 36/sq mi (14/km^{2})
- ZIP codes: 47108 47452
- GNIS feature ID: 0453142

Brown Township is one of thirteen townships in Washington County, Indiana, United States. As of the 2020 census, its population was 1,100 and it contained 502 housing units.

Historical population
Census	Pop.	Note	%±
1890	1,422		—
1900	1,713		20.5%
1910	1,592		−7.1%
1920	1,490		−6.4%
1930	1,323		−11.2%
1940	1,324		0.1%
1950	1,333		0.7%
1960	1,295		−2.9%
1970	1,305		0.8%
1980	1,336		2.4%
1990	1,229		−8.0%
2000	1,219		−0.8%
2010	1,199		−1.6%
2020	1,100		−8.3%
Source: US Decennial Census

== Geography ==
According to the 2010 census, the township has a total area of 30.93 square miles (80.1 km^{2}), of which 30.73 square miles (79.6 km^{2}) (or 99.35%) is land and 0.2 square miles (0.52 km^{2}) (or 0.65%) is water.

=== Cities, towns, villages ===
- Campbellsburg
- Saltillo

=== Unincorporated towns ===
- Brimstone Corners at 38.737276°N 86.264429°W
- Mount Carmel at 38.716999°N 86.249428°W

(This list is based on USGS data and may include former settlements.)

=== Adjacent townships ===
- Carr Township, Jackson County (northeast)
- Jefferson Township (east)
- Vernon Township (south)
- Northeast Township, Orange County (southwest)
- Bono Township, Lawrence County (west)
- Guthrie Township, Lawrence County (northwest)

=== Cemeteries ===
The township contains these two cemeteries: Mount Carmeltoe and New Hope.

=== Rivers ===
- East Fork White River

== School districts ==
- West Washington School Corporation

== Political districts ==
- Indiana's 9th congressional district
- State House District 62
- State Senate District 44
