= Gibson Township, Washington County, Indiana =

Gibson Township
- Township
- Location in Washington County
- Coordinates: 38°42′26″N 85°57′02″W
- Country: United States
- State: Indiana
- County: Washington

Government
  - Type: Indiana township

Area
  - Total: 51.13 sq mi (132.4 km^{2})
  - Land: 50.97 sq mi (132.0 km^{2})
  - Water: 0.16 sq mi (0.41 km^{2}) 0.31%
- Elevation: 545 ft (166 m)

Population (2020)
  - Total: 1,105
  - Density: 21.68/sq mi (8.370/km^{2})
- ZIP codes: 47139, 47167, 47170
- GNIS feature ID: 0453329

Gibson Township is one of thirteen townships in Washington County, Indiana, United States. As of the 2020 census, its population was 1,105 and it contained 491 housing units.

Historical population
Census	Pop.	Note	%±
1890	1,680		—
1900	1,697		1.0%
1910	1,290		−24.0%
1920	1,119		−13.3%
1930	875		−21.8%
1940	1,033		18.1%
1950	971		−6.0%
1960	1,001		3.1%
1970	911		−9.0%
1980	917		0.7%
1990	967		5.5%
2000	1,207		24.8%
2010	1,176		−2.6%
2020	1,105		−6.0%
Source: US Decennial Census

== Geography ==
According to the 2010 census, the township has a total area of 51.13 square miles (132.4 km^{2}), of which 50.97 square miles (132.0 km^{2}) (or 99.69%) is land and 0.16 square miles (0.41 km^{2}) (or 0.31%) is water.

=== Cities, towns, villages ===
- Little York

=== Unincorporated towns ===
- Georgetown at 38.648391°N 85.998309°W
- Gooseport at 38.710057°N 85.940807°W
- Pumpkin Center at 38.704224°N 85.95053°W

(This list is based on USGS data and may include former settlements.)

=== Adjacent townships ===
- Grassy Fork Township, Jackson County (north)
- Vernon Township, Jackson County (northeast)
- Finley Township, Scott County (southeast)
- Franklin Township (south)
- Washington Township (southwest)
- Monroe Township (west)

== School districts ==
- Salem Community Schools

== Political districts ==
- Indiana's 9th congressional district
- State House District 73
- State Senate District 45
