= Madison Township, Washington County, Indiana =

Madison Township
- Township
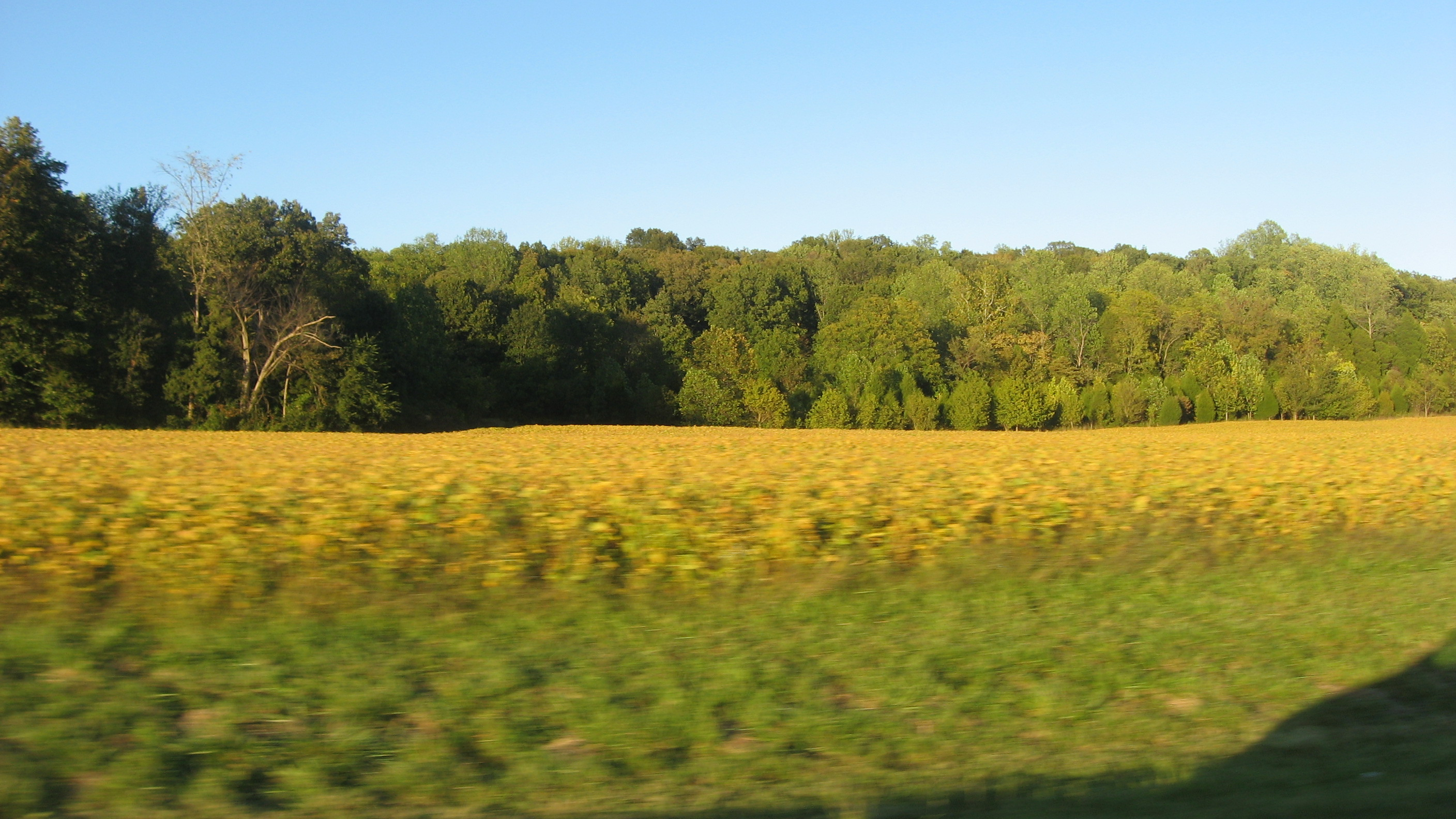
- Countryside in the township

- Location in Washington County
- Coordinates: 38°31′15″N 86°16′36″W
- Country: United States
- State: Indiana
- County: Washington

Government
  - Type: Indiana township

Area
  - Total: 26.09 sq mi (67.6 km^{2})
  - Land: 26.04 sq mi (67.4 km^{2})
  - Water: 0.05 sq mi (0.13 km^{2}) 0.19%
- Elevation: 748 ft (228 m)

Population (2020)
  - Total: 628
  - Density: 24.1/sq mi (9.31/km^{2})
- ZIP codes: 47108, 47125, 47167, 47452
- GNIS feature ID: 0453600

Madison Township is one of thirteen townships in Washington County, Indiana, United States. As of the 2020 census, its population was 628 and it contained 256 housing units.

Historical population
Census	Pop.	Note	%±
1890	949		—
1900	911		−4.0%
1910	749		−17.8%
1920	664		−11.3%
1930	541		−18.5%
1940	660		22.0%
1950	575		−12.9%
1960	516		−10.3%
1970	513		−0.6%
1980	555		8.2%
1990	607		9.4%
2000	602		−0.8%
2010	705		17.1%
2020	628		−10.9%
Source: US Decennial Census

== Geography ==
According to the 2010 census, the township has a total area of 26.09 square miles (67.6 km^{2}), of which 26.04 square miles (67.4 km^{2}) (or 99.81%) is land and 0.05 square miles (0.13 km^{2}) (or 0.19%) is water.

=== Cities, towns, villages ===
- Livonia

=== Adjacent townships ===
- Vernon Township (north)
- Howard Township (east)
- Posey Township (southeast)
- Southeast Township, Orange County (southwest)
- Stampers Creek Township, Orange County (west)

=== Cemeteries ===
The township contains these four cemeteries: Livonia, Hardin, Providence and Sinking Spring.

== School districts ==
- West Washington School Corporation

== Political districts ==
- Indiana's 9th congressional district
- State House District 73
- State Senate District 44
