= Lynn, Indiana =

Lynn
- Town
- Town of Lynn
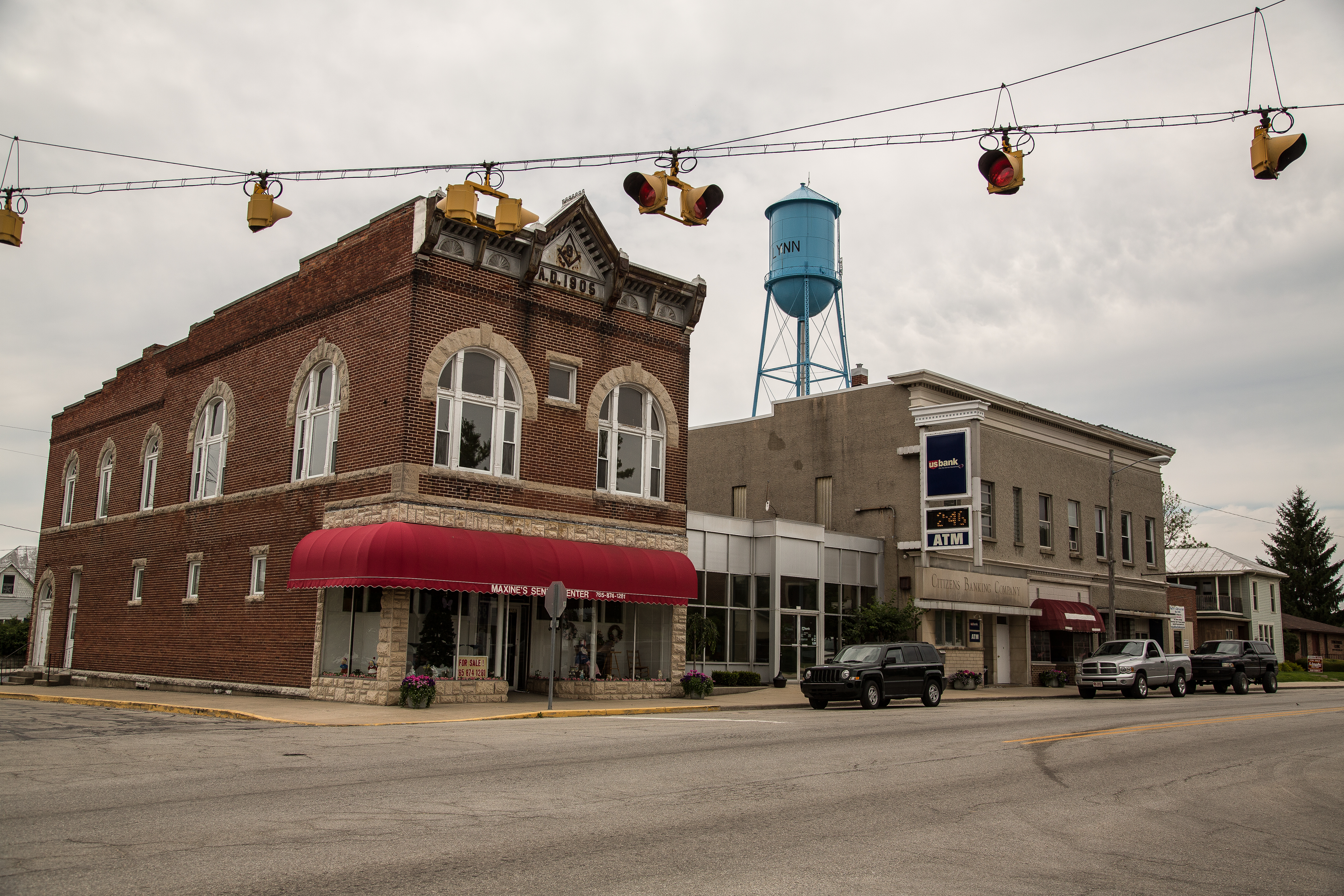

- Location of Lynn in Randolph County, Indiana.
- Coordinates: 40°02′55″N 84°56′33″W
- Country: United States
- State: Indiana
- County: Randolph
- Township: Washington

Area
  - Total: 0.56 sq mi (1.46 km^{2})
  - Land: 0.56 sq mi (1.46 km^{2})
  - Water: 0 sq mi (0.00 km^{2})
- Elevation: 1,168 ft (356 m)

Population (2020)
  - Total: 954
  - Estimate (2025): 931 ▼
  - Density: 1,689.0/sq mi (652.14/km^{2})
- Time zone: UTC-5 (EST)
  - Summer (DST): UTC-4 (EDT)
- ZIP code: 47355
- Area code: 765
- FIPS code: 18-45468
- GNIS feature ID: 2396729
- Website: www.in.gov/towns/lynn/

Lynn is a town in Washington Township, Randolph County, in the U.S. state of Indiana. The population was 954 at the 2020 census.

== History ==
A post office was established at Lynn in 1838. The town plat was recorded in 1850.

On March 10, 1986, an F3 tornado struck the town, causing considerable damage to several homes. This tornado was part of a larger tornado outbreak. Despite the damage, however, there were no injuries reported.

== Geography ==
Lynn is located at 40°2′51″N 84°56′32″W (40.047590, -84.942173).

According to the 2010 census, Lynn has a total area of 0.56 square miles (1.45 km^{2}), all land.

== Demographics ==
Historical population
Census	Pop.	Note	%±
1880	239		—
1890	518		116.7%
1900	705		36.1%
1910	917		30.1%
1920	808		−11.9%
1930	936		15.8%
1940	1,014		8.3%
1950	1,149		13.3%
1960	1,260		9.7%
1970	1,360		7.9%
1980	1,250		−8.1%
1990	1,183		−5.4%
2000	1,143		−3.4%
2010	1,097		−4.0%
2020	954		−13.0%
2025 (est.)	931		−2.4%
U.S. Decennial Census

=== 2010 census ===
As of the census of 2010, there were 1,097 people, 439 households, and 302 families living in the town. The population density was 1,958.9 inhabitants per square mile (756.3/km^{2}). There were 498 housing units at an average density of 889.3 per square mile (343.4/km^{2}). The racial makeup of the town was 97.7% White, 0.5% African American, 0.1% Native American, 0.7% Asian, 0.2% from other races, and 0.8% from two or more races. Hispanic or Latino of any race were 1.9% of the population.

There were 439 households, of which 35.1% had children under the age of 18 living with them, 49.0% were married couples living together, 13.4% had a female householder with no husband present, 6.4% had a male householder with no wife present, and 31.2% were non-families. 26.2% of all households were made up of individuals, and 14.8% had someone living alone who was 65 years of age or older. The average household size was 2.50 and the average family size was 2.97.

The median age in the town was 37.9 years. 25.7% of residents were under the age of 18; 8.7% were between the ages of 18 and 24; 24.6% were from 25 to 44; 23% were from 45 to 64; and 17.9% were 65 years of age or older. The gender makeup of the town was 48.3% male and 51.7% female.

=== 2000 census ===
As of the census of 2000, there were 1,143 people, 468 households, and 313 families living in the town. The population density was 2,027.3 inhabitants per square mile (782.7/km^{2}). There were 508 housing units at an average density of 901.0 per square mile (347.9/km^{2}). The racial makeup of the town was 96.50% White, 0.35% African American, 0.17% Native American, 0.44% Asian, 0.35% Pacific Islander, 0.26% from other races, and 1.92% from two or more races. Hispanic or Latino of any race were 0.44% of the population.

There were 468 households, out of which 32.1% had children under the age of 18 living with them, 53.2% were married couples living together, 9.4% had a female householder with no husband present, and 33.1% were non-families. 28.6% of all households were made up of individuals, and 14.7% had someone living alone who was 65 years of age or older. The average household size was 2.44 and the average family size was 2.99.

In the town, the population was spread out, with 26.3% under the age of 18, 9.2% from 18 to 24, 26.5% from 25 to 44, 22.4% from 45 to 64, and 15.6% who were 65 years of age or older. The median age was 36 years. For every 100 females, there were 92.4 males. For every 100 females age 18 and over, there were 91.4 males.

The median income for a household in the town was $32,368, and the median income for a family was $38,636. Males had a median income of $27,917 versus $20,438 for females. The per capita income for the town was $15,148. About 7.9% of families and 10.2% of the population were below the poverty line, including 11.1% of those under age 18 and 12.3% of those age 65 or over.

== Education ==
It is in the Randolph Southern School Corporation.

The town has a lending library, the Lynn-Washington Township Public Library.

== Notable person ==
- Jim Jones grew up in the area. He would later lead the Peoples Temple cult murder at Jonestown.
