= New Salem, Washington County, Indiana =

New Salem
- Unincorporated community
- Washington County's location in Indiana

- Location of New Salem in Washington County
- Coordinates: 38°37′17″N 85°54′15″W
- Country: United States
- State: Indiana
- County: Washington
- Township: Franklin
- Elevation: 981 ft (299 m)
- Time zone: UTC-5 (Eastern (EST))
  - Summer (DST): UTC-4 (EDT)
- ZIP code: 47167
- Area codes: 812, 930
- GNIS feature ID: 440108

New Salem is an unincorporated community in Franklin Township, Washington County, in the U.S. state of Indiana.

== Geography ==
New Salem is located at 38°37′17″N 85°54′15″W.
