= Blue River, Indiana =

- Unincorporated community
- Washington County's location in Indiana

- Location of Blue River in Washington County
- Coordinates: 38°31′48″N 85°56′22″W
- Country: United States
- State: Indiana
- County: Washington
- Township: Polk
- Elevation: 758 ft (231 m)
- Time zone: UTC-5 (Eastern (EST))
  - Summer (DST): UTC-4 (EDT)
- ZIP code: 47165
- Area codes: 812, 930
- GNIS feature ID: 431237

Blue River is an unincorporated community in Polk Township, Washington County, in the U.S. state of Indiana.

== History ==
A post office was established at Blue River in 1873, and remained in operation until it was discontinued in 1904. In 1890, the population of Blue River was estimated as around 200 residents. In 1900, the population was 25. By 1920, the population was 112. The population was 34 in 1930.

== Geography ==
Blue River is located at 38°31′48″N 85°56′22″W.
