= Monroe Township, Washington County, Indiana =

Monroe Township
- Township
- Location in Washington County
- Coordinates: 38°43′23″N 86°04′17″W
- Country: United States
- State: Indiana
- County: Washington

Government
  - Type: Indiana township

Area
  - Total: 38.85 sq mi (100.6 km^{2})
  - Land: 38.44 sq mi (99.6 km^{2})
  - Water: 0.41 sq mi (1.1 km^{2}) 1.06%
- Elevation: 584 ft (178 m)

Population (2020)
  - Total: 610
  - Density: 16/sq mi (6.1/km^{2})
- ZIP codes: 47167, 47170 47281
- GNIS feature ID: 0453648

Monroe Township is one of thirteen townships in Washington County, Indiana, United States. As of the 2020 census, its population was 610 and it contained 254 housing units.

Historical population
Census	Pop.	Note	%±
1890	1,041		—
1900	1,086		4.3%
1910	807		−25.7%
1920	774		−4.1%
1930	706		−8.8%
1940	725		2.7%
1950	392		−45.9%
1960	457		16.6%
1970	462		1.1%
1980	460		−0.4%
1990	525		14.1%
2000	615		17.1%
2010	558		−9.3%
2020	610		9.3%
Source: US Decennial Census

== Geography ==
According to the 2010 census, the township has a total area of 38.85 square miles (100.6 km^{2}), of which 38.44 square miles (99.6 km^{2}) (or 98.94%) is land and 0.41 square miles (1.1 km^{2}) (or 1.06%) is water.

=== Unincorporated towns ===
- Kossuth at 38.704500°N 86.102757°W
- Millport
- Plattsburg at 38.719500°N 86.089701°W

(This list is based on USGS data and may include former settlements.)

=== Adjacent townships ===
- Driftwood Township, Jackson County (north)
- Grassy Fork Township, Jackson County (northeast)
- Gibson Township (east)
- Washington Township (south)
- Jefferson Township (west)

=== Cemeteries ===
The township contains these five cemeteries: Collett, Gater, Peugh, Ridlen and Weston.

== School districts ==
- Salem Community Schools

== Political districts ==
- Indiana's 9th congressional district
- State House District 73
- State Senate District 44
