= South Boston, Indiana =

- Unincorporated community
- Washington County's location in Indiana

- Location of South Boston in Washington County
- Coordinates: 38°34′58″N 85°58′45″W
- Country: United States
- State: Indiana
- County: Washington
- Township: Franklin
- Elevation: 768 ft (234 m)
- Time zone: UTC-5 (Eastern (EST))
  - Summer (DST): UTC-4 (EDT)
- ZIP code: 47167
- Area codes: 812, 930
- FIPS code: 18-71036
- GNIS feature ID: 443780

South Boston is an unincorporated community in Franklin Township, Washington County, in the U.S. state of Indiana.

== History ==
South Boston was not formally laid out or platted. In the 19th century, a small store was established at South Boston, around which the community grew.

A post office was established at South Boston in 1850, and remained in operation until it was discontinued in 1918.

== Geography ==
South Boston is located at 38°34′58″N 85°58′45″W.
