= Georgetown, Washington County, Indiana =

Georgetown
- Unincorporated community
- Washington County's location in Indiana

- Location of Georgetown in Washington County
- Coordinates: 38°38′54″N 85°59′54″W
- Country: United States
- State: Indiana
- County: Washington
- Township: Gibson
- Elevation: 925 ft (282 m)
- Time zone: UTC-5 (Eastern (EST))
  - Summer (DST): UTC-4 (EDT)
- ZIP code: 47167
- Area codes: 812, 930
- GNIS feature ID: 435026

Georgetown is an unincorporated community in Gibson Township, Washington County, in the U.S. state of Indiana.

== Geography ==
Georgetown is located at 38°38′54″N 85°59′54″W.
