= Canton, Indiana =

- Unincorporated community
- Washington County's location in Indiana

- Canton's location in Washington County
- Coordinates: 38°37′26″N 86°02′05″W
- Country: United States
- State: Indiana
- County: Washington
- Township: Washington
- Elevation: 869 ft (265 m)
- Time zone: UTC-5 (Eastern (EST))
  - Summer (DST): UTC-4 (EDT)
- ZIP code: 47167
- Area codes: 812, 930
- GNIS feature ID: 432116

Canton is an unincorporated community in Washington Township, Washington County, in the U.S. state of Indiana.

== History ==
Canton was laid out and platted in 1838. Old variant names of the community were Greensburg and Eggharbor.

A post office was established at Canton in 1835, and remained in operation until it was discontinued in 1905.

== Demographics ==
The United States Census Bureau delineated Canton as a census designated place in the 2022 American Community Survey.
