= Saltillo, Indiana =

- Town
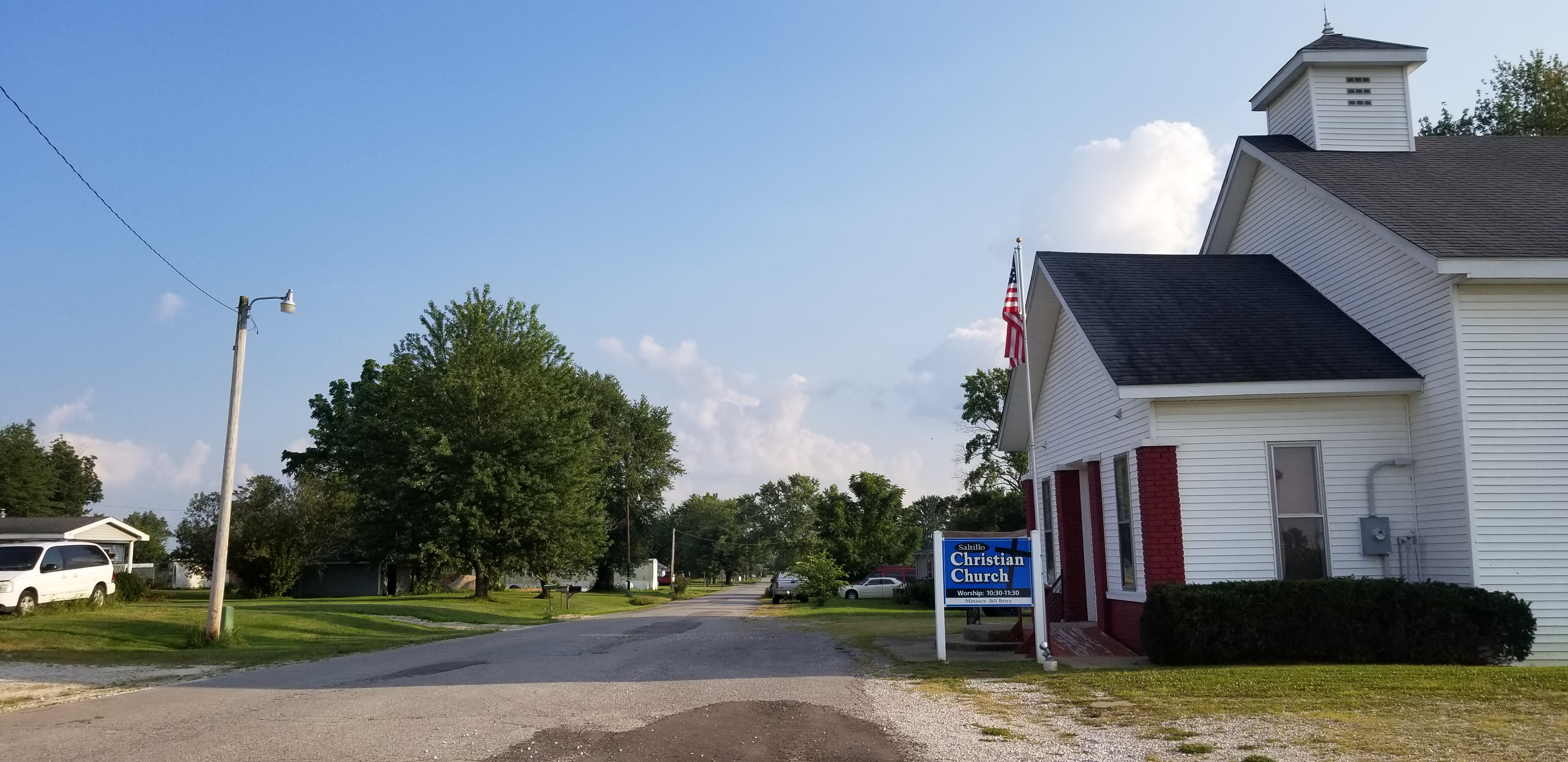
- Looking up Main Street in Saltillo, Indiana. Saltillo Christian Church is visible in the foreground.

- Location of Saltillo in Washington County, Indiana.
- Coordinates: 38°39′58″N 86°17′51″W
- Country: United States
- State: Indiana
- County: Washington
- Township: Brown

Area
  - Total: 1.15 sq mi (2.99 km^{2})
  - Land: 1.15 sq mi (2.98 km^{2})
  - Water: 0.0039 sq mi (0.01 km^{2})
- Elevation: 781 ft (238 m)

Population (2020)
  - Total: 94
  - Density: 81.6/sq mi (31.52/km^{2})
- Time zone: UTC-5 (Eastern (EST))
  - Summer (DST): UTC-4 (EDT)
- ZIP code: 47108
- Area codes: 812 and 930
- FIPS code: 18-67626
- GNIS feature ID: 2396903

Saltillo is a town in Brown Township, Washington County, in the U.S. state of Indiana. As of the 2020 census, Saltillo had a population of 94.

== History ==
Saltillo was laid out and platted in 1849. It was named in commemoration of Saltillo, Mexico, the location of a battle in the Mexican–American War.

A post office was established at Saltillo in 1854, and remained in operation until it was discontinued in 1957.

== Geography ==
Saltillo is located at 38°39′51″N 86°17′23″W (38.664258, -86.289727).

According to the 2010 census, Saltillo has a total area of 1.152 square miles (2.98 km^{2}), of which 1.15 square miles (2.98 km^{2}) (or 99.83%) is land and 0.002 square miles (0.01 km^{2}) (or 0.17%) is water.

== Demographics ==
Historical population
Census	Pop.	Note	%±
1900	207		—
1910	162		−21.7%
1920	127		−21.6%
1930	160		26.0%
1940	125		−21.9%
1950	122		−2.4%
1960	121		−0.8%
1970	134		10.7%
1980	134		0.0%
1990	117		−12.7%
2000	107		−8.5%
2010	92		−14.0%
2020	94		2.2%
U.S. Decennial Census

=== 2010 census ===
As of the census of 2010, there were 92 people, 42 households, and 29 families living in the town. The population density was 80.0 inhabitants per square mile (30.9/km^{2}). There were 50 housing units at an average density of 43.5 per square mile (16.8/km^{2}). The racial makeup of the town was 98.9% White and 1.1% from other races. Hispanic or Latino of any race were 1.1% of the population.

There were 42 households, of which 19.0% had children under the age of 18 living with them, 54.8% were married couples living together, 9.5% had a female householder with no husband present, 4.8% had a male householder with no wife present, and 31.0% were non-families. 28.6% of all households were made up of individuals, and 11.9% had someone living alone who was 65 years of age or older. The average household size was 2.19 and the average family size was 2.66.

The median age in the town was 48.3 years. 15.2% of residents were under the age of 18; 10.8% were between the ages of 18 and 24; 18.5% were from 25 to 44; 33.6% were from 45 to 64; and 21.7% were 65 years of age or older. The gender makeup of the town was 50.0% male and 50.0% female.

=== 2000 census ===
As of the census of 2000, there were 107 people, 47 households, and 33 families living in the town. The population density was 92.0 inhabitants per square mile (35.5/km^{2}). There were 56 housing units at an average density of 48.2 per square mile (18.6/km^{2}). The racial makeup of the town was 100.00% White. Hispanic or Latino of any race were 0.93% of the population.

There were 47 households, out of which 25.5% had children under the age of 18 living with them, 66.0% were married couples living together, 6.4% had a female householder with no husband present, and 27.7% were non-families. 25.5% of all households were made up of individuals, and 17.0% had someone living alone who was 65 years of age or older. The average household size was 2.28 and the average family size was 2.74.

In the town, the population was spread out, with 19.6% under the age of 18, 6.5% from 18 to 24, 28.0% from 25 to 44, 23.4% from 45 to 64, and 22.4% who were 65 years of age or older. The median age was 40 years. For every 100 females, there were 105.8 males. For every 100 females age 18 and over, there were 87.0 males.

The median income for a household in the town was $22,500, and the median income for a family was $51,250. Males had a median income of $38,125 versus $21,042 for females. The per capita income for the town was $16,253. There were 9.1% of families and 12.1% of the population living below the poverty line, including 16.7% of under eighteens and 20.8% of those over 64.

== Education ==
It is in the West Washington School Corporation.
