= Haleysburg, Indiana =

- Unincorporated community
- Washington County's location in Indiana

- Location of Haleysburg in Washington County
- Coordinates: 38°44′32″N 86°09′02″W
- Country: United States
- State: Indiana
- County: Washington
- Township: Jefferson
- Elevation: 584 ft (178 m)
- Time zone: UTC-5 (Eastern (EST))
  - Summer (DST): UTC-4 (EDT)
- ZIP code: 47281
- Area codes: 812, 930
- GNIS feature ID: 435601

Haleysburg is an unincorporated town in Jefferson Township, Washington County, in the U.S. state of Indiana.

== History ==
A post office was established in 1883, and remained in operation until 1885. The town took its name from the Haley family.
