= William Alexander Parsons Martin =

American missionary in China (1827–1916)

W. A. P. Martin
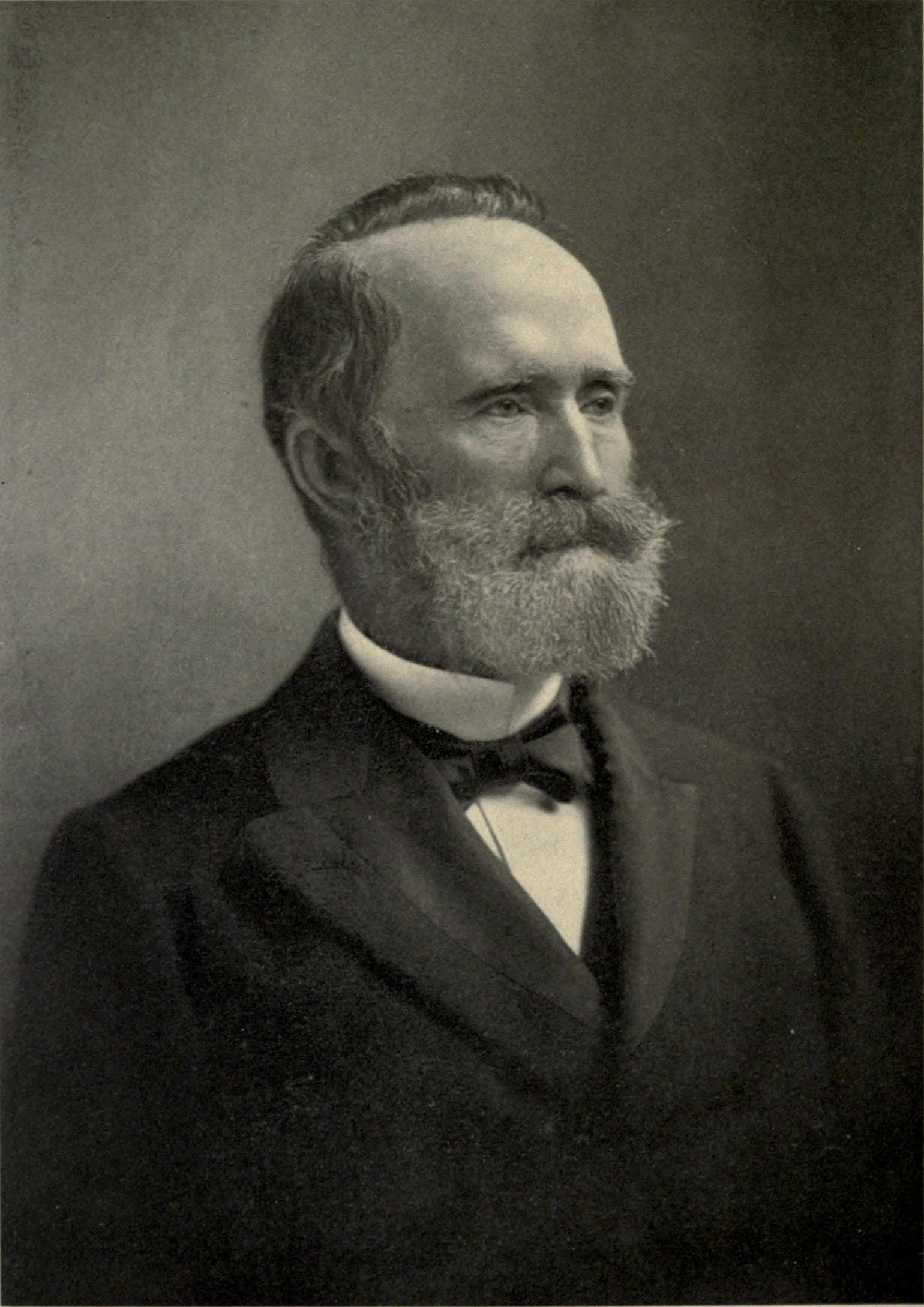
- Portrait of Martin (published 1901)
- Born: April 10, 1827; Livonia, Indiana, United States
- Died: December 18, 1916 (aged 89); Peking (Beijing), Republic of China

William Alexander Parsons Martin (April 10, 1827 – December 18, 1916), also known as Dīng Wěiliáng (Chinese: 丁韙良), was an American Presbyterian missionary to China and translator, famous for having translated a number of important Western treatises into Chinese, such as Henry Wheaton's Elements of International Law.

== Biography ==
Martin was born in Livonia, Indiana. He graduated from Indiana University in 1846 and then studied theology at the Presbyterian seminary, New Albany, Indiana. In 1850, Martin arrived in Ningbo, Zhejiang, China, where he worked for the next ten years.

Martin served as interpreter for the United States minister William B. Reed, in negotiating the treaty of Treaty of Tientsin in 1858 with China, and in 1859 traveled with his successor, John Elliot Ward, to Beijing and to Edo, Japan.

From 1863 till 1868, he worked at Beijing, often as official interpreter for the American Minister to China, Anson Burlingame. He was reputed to be the first foreigner to make the journey from Beijing to Shanghai on the Grand Canal of China, and described the trip in the Journal of the Asiatic Society (1866). In 1869, Martin became president of the Tongwenguan in Beijing until 1895, and a professor of international law. He acted as an adviser of Chinese officials on questions of international law when disputes arose with European powers, notably during the conflict with France in 1884–1885. In the same year he was made a mandarin of the third class. On August 9, 1898, Martin was appointed by the Guangxu Emperor as the inaugural president of the Imperial University of Peking, the precursor of Peking University.

Martin received the degree of D.D. from Lafayette College in 1860, and that of LL. D. from the University of the City of New York in 1870.

He died at the American Presbyterian Mission in Beijing on December 18, 1916.

== Published works ==
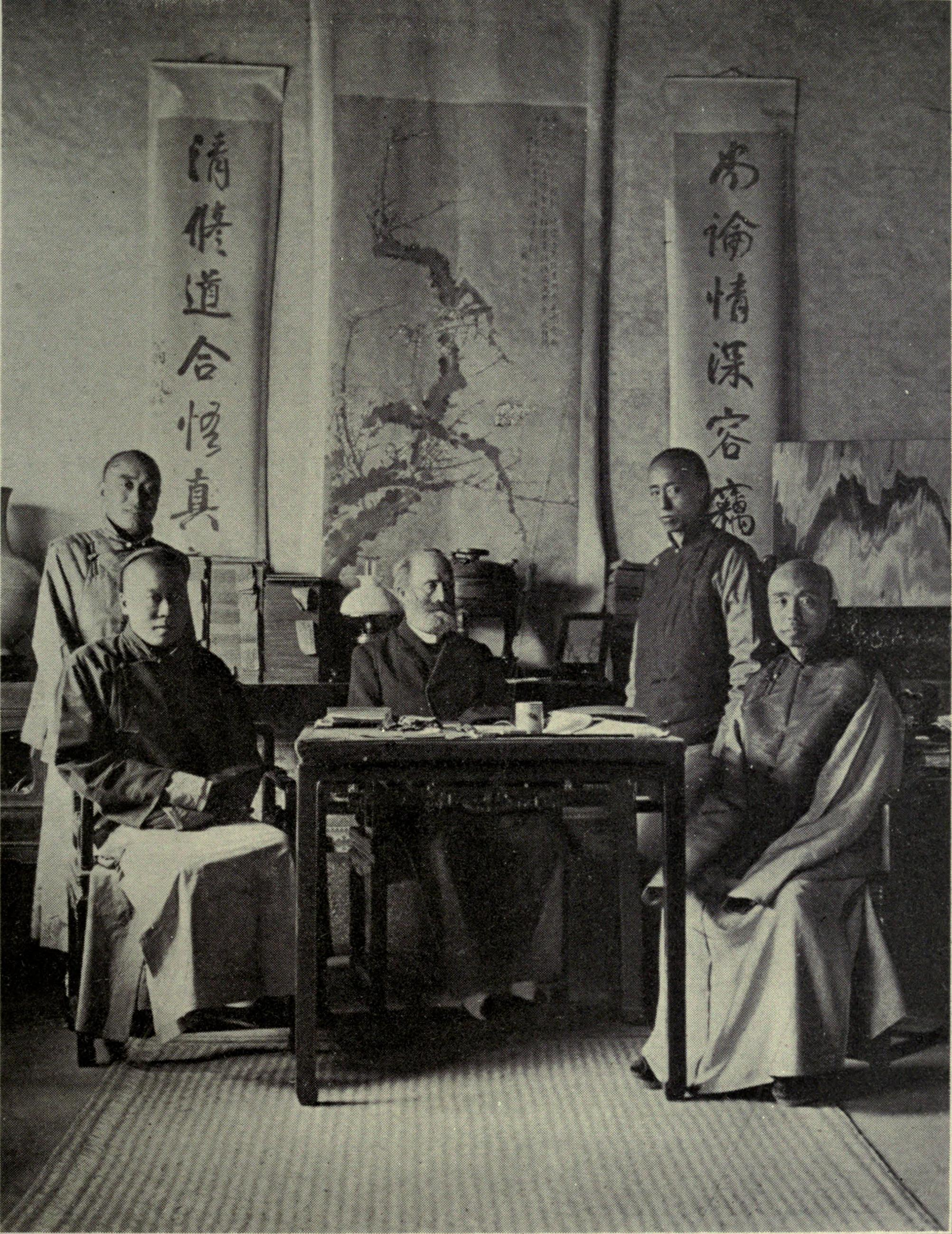
Above: Martin with his students. Below: With the faculty of the Chinese Imperial University, the predecessor of Peking University.

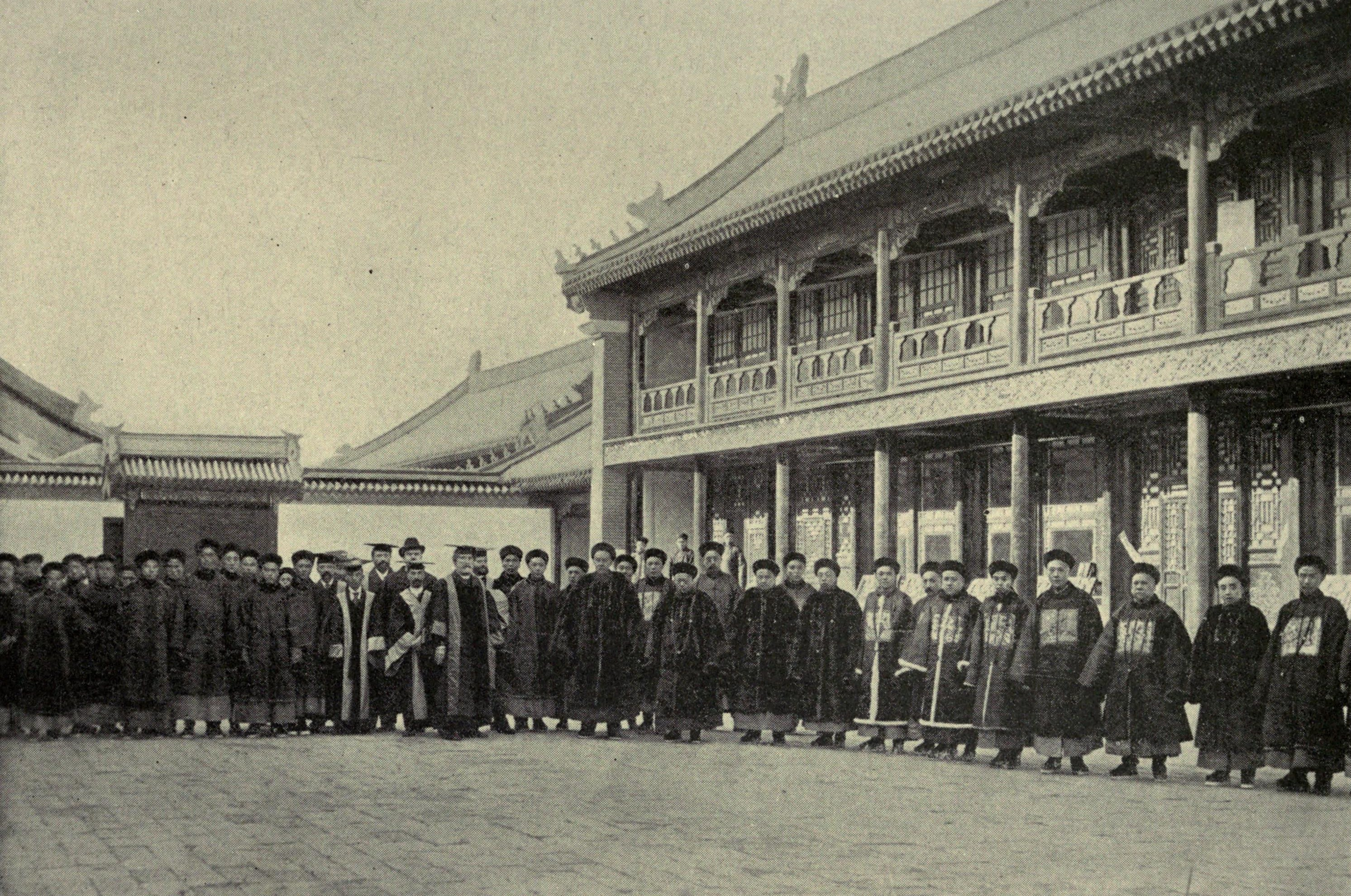

Dr. Martin edited the Peking Scientific Magazine, printed in Chinese, from 1875 till 1878, and also published in the Chinese language:

- Evidences of Christianity (1855; 10th ed., 1885), which was translated into Japanese and obtained a large circulation in Japan;
- The Three Principles (1856)
- Religious Allegories (1857)
- (tr. into Chinese) Elements of International Law by Henry Wheaton (1863)
- an educational treatise on Natural Philosophy (1866)
- (tr. into Chinese) Introduction to the Study of International Law by Theodore D. Woolsey (1875)
- (tr. into Chinese) Guide Diplomatique by Georg F. von Martens
- (tr. into Chinese) Das moderne Völkerrecht by Johann K. Bluntschli (1879). Translated from Charles Lardy's French edition, Le Driot international codifié.
- Mathematical Physics (1885)
- (tr. into Chinese) Treatise on International Law by W. E. Hall (1903)

Dr. Martin also contributed to American and English reviews and to the transactions of learned societies, and published in English:

- The Chinese : their Education, Philosophy, and Letters (Shanghai and London, 1880; new ed., New York, 1881).
- A cycle of Cathay; or, China, south and north, with personal reminiscences Edinburgh: Oliphant, Anderson and Ferrier, 1896. -University of Hong Kong Libraries, Digital Initiatives, China Through Western Eyes
- The Siege in Peking, China against the World: By an eye witness (1900)
- The Lore of Cathay or the Intellect of China (1901)
- The Jewish Monument at Kaifungfu (1906)

== Archival collections ==
The Presbyterian Historical Society in Philadelphia, Pennsylvania, has a collection of William Alexander Parsons Martin' original manuscripts.
