= Mount Carmel, Washington County, Indiana =

Mount Carmel
- Unincorporated community
- Washington County's location in Indiana

- Location of Mount Carmel in Washington County
- Coordinates: 38°42′59″N 86°14′58″W
- Country: United States
- State: Indiana
- County: Washington County
- Township: Brown Township
- Elevation: 712 ft (217 m)
- Time zone: UTC-5 (Eastern (EST))
  - Summer (DST): UTC-4 (EDT)
- ZIP code: 47108
- Area codes: 812, 930
- GNIS feature ID: 447650

Mount Carmel is an unincorporated community in Brown Township, Washington County, in the U.S. state of Indiana.

== History ==
Mount Carmel was laid out by John and William Brown, December 20, 1837.

== Geography ==
Mount Carmel is located at 38°42′59″N 86°14′58″W.
