= James A. Cravens =

American politician (1818–1893)

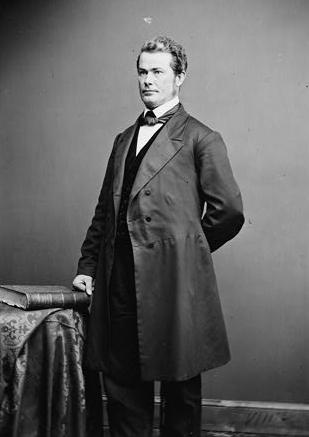
- Cravens, c. 1860–1865

Member of the U.S. House of Representatives from Indiana's 2nd district
- In office March 4, 1861 – March 4, 1865
- Preceded by: William H. English
- Succeeded by: Michael C. Kerr

Member of the Indiana House of Representatives
- In office 1848–1849

Member of the Indiana Senate
- In office 1850-1853

Personal details
- Born: James Addison Cravens; November 4, 1818 Rockingham County, Virginia, US
- Died: June 20, 1893 (aged 74) Hardinsburg, Indiana, US
- Party: Democratic
- Profession: Politician

James Addison Cravens (November 4, 1818 – June 20, 1893) was a nineteenth-century politician and military veteran from Indiana who served two terms in the United States House of Representatives from 1861 to 1865. He was the second cousin of James Harrison Cravens.

== Biography ==
Born in Rockingham County, Virginia, Cravens moved near Hardinsburg, Indiana with his father in 1820 where he attended public schools as a child. He engaged in agricultural pursuits and livestock raising.

=== Mexican-American War ===
served in the Mexican–American War as Major (United States) of the 2nd Indiana Volunteer Regiment from 1846 to 1847 and was a member of the Indiana House of Representatives in 1848 and 1849. Cravens served in the Indiana Senate from 1850 to 1853, was commissioned a brigadier general in the Indiana Militia in 1854.

=== Political career ===
He was elected a Democrat to the United States House of Representatives in 1860, serving from 1861 to 1865, not being a candidate for renomination in 1864. During the lame-duck session of the 38th Congress, he voted against the Thirteenth Amendment abolishing slavery.

He was a delegate to the National Union Convention in 1866 and to the Democratic National Convention in 1868.

=== Later career and death ===
He resumed agricultural pursuits until his death in Hardinsburg, Indiana on June 20, 1893. He was interred in Hardin Cemetery in Hardinsburg.

U.S. House of Representatives
| Preceded by William H. English | Member of the U.S. House of Representatives from Indiana's 2nd congressional district March 4, 1861 – March 4, 1865 | Succeeded by Michael C. Kerr |
