= Vernon Township, Washington County, Indiana =

Vernon Township
- Township
- Location in Washington County
- Coordinates: 38°36′23″N 86°15′14″W
- Country: United States
- State: Indiana
- County: Washington

Government
  - Type: Indiana township

Area
  - Total: 34.1 sq mi (88 km^{2})
  - Land: 34.03 sq mi (88.1 km^{2})
  - Water: 0.07 sq mi (0.18 km^{2}) 0.21%
- Elevation: 804 ft (245 m)

Population (2020)
  - Total: 667
  - Density: 19.6/sq mi (7.57/km^{2})
- ZIP codes: 47108, 47167, 47452
- GNIS feature ID: 0453958

Vernon Township is one of thirteen townships in Washington County, Indiana, United States. As of the 2020 census, its population was 667 and it contained 263 housing units.

Historical population
Census	Pop.	Note	%±
1890	1,013		—
1900	1,072		5.8%
1910	878		−18.1%
1920	813		−7.4%
1930	727		−10.6%
1940	644		−11.4%
1950	688		6.8%
1960	637		−7.4%
1970	654		2.7%
1980	659		0.8%
1990	727		10.3%
2000	684		−5.9%
2010	669		−2.2%
2020	667		−0.3%
Source: US Decennial Census

== Geography ==
According to the 2010 census, the township has a total area of 34.1 square miles (88 km^{2}), of which 34.03 square miles (88.1 km^{2}) (or 99.79%) is land and 0.07 square miles (0.18 km^{2}) (or 0.21%) is water.

=== Unincorporated towns ===
- Claysville at 38.622556°N 86.289428°W
- Smedley at 38.633112°N 86.215815°W

(This list is based on USGS data and may include former settlements.)

=== Adjacent townships ===
- Brown Township (north)
- Jefferson Township (northeast)
- Washington Township (east)
- Howard Township (southeast)
- Madison Township (south)
- Stampers Creek Township, Orange County (southwest)
- Northeast Township, Orange County (west)

=== Cemeteries ===
The township contains these three cemeteries: Hamilton, Mount Tabor and Old Smedley.

== School districts ==
- West Washington School Corporation

== Political districts ==
- Indiana's 9th congressional district
- State House District 73
- State Senate District 44

== Sources ==
- United States Census Bureau 2007 TIGER/Line Shapefiles
- United States Board on Geographic Names (GNIS)
- IndianaMap
