= Gooseport, Indiana =

- Unincorporated community
- Washington County's location in Indiana

- Location of Gooseport in Washington County
- Coordinates: 38°42′36″N 85°56′27″W
- Country: United States
- State: Indiana
- County: Washington
- Township: Gibson
- Elevation: 571 ft (174 m)
- Time zone: UTC-5 (Eastern (EST))
  - Summer (DST): UTC-4 (EDT)
- ZIP code: 47170
- Area codes: 812, 930
- GNIS feature ID: 452182

Gooseport is an unincorporated community in Gibson Township, Washington County, in the U.S. state of Indiana.
