= Livonia, Indiana =

- Town
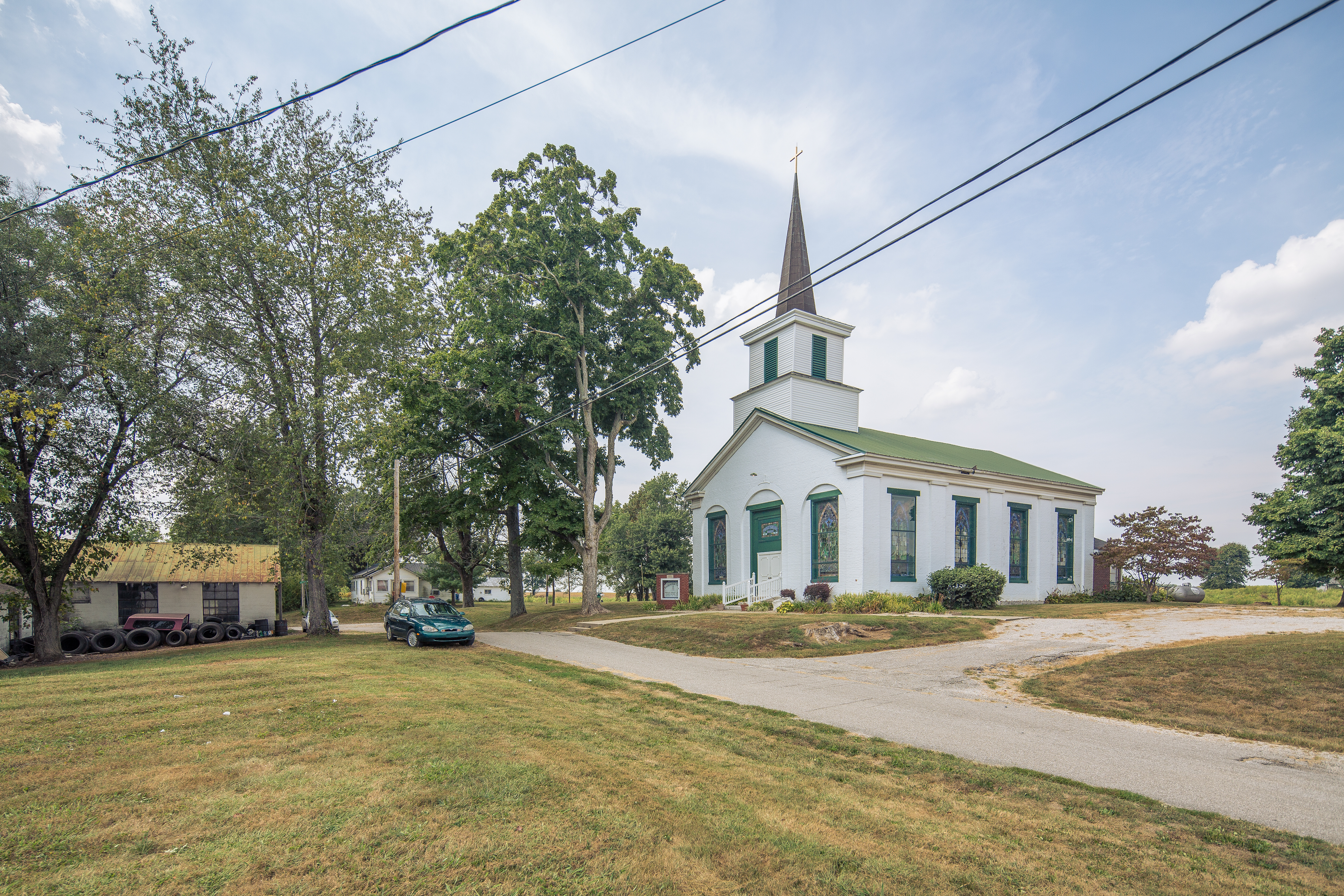

- Location of Livonia in Washington County, Indiana.
- Coordinates: 38°33′18″N 86°16′40″W
- Country: United States
- State: Indiana
- County: Washington
- Township: Madison

Area
  - Total: 1.04 sq mi (2.69 km^{2})
  - Land: 1.04 sq mi (2.69 km^{2})
  - Water: 0 sq mi (0.00 km^{2})
- Elevation: 781 ft (238 m)

Population (2020)
  - Total: 99
  - Density: 95.5/sq mi (36.87/km^{2})
- Time zone: UTC-5 (Eastern (EST))
  - Summer (DST): UTC-4 (EDT)
- ZIP code: 47108
- Area code: 812
- FIPS code: 18-44424
- GNIS feature ID: 2396720

Livonia is a town in Madison Township, Washington County, in the U.S. state of Indiana. As of the 2020 census, Livonia had a population of 99.

== History ==
Livonia was laid out in 1819.

A post office was established at Livonia in 1818, and remained in operation until it was discontinued in 1925.

== Geography ==
According to the 2010 census, Livonia has a total area of 1.04 square miles (2.69 km^{2}), all land.

== Demographics ==
Historical population
Census	Pop.	Note	%±
1880	211		—
1890	194		−8.1%
1900	200		3.1%
1910	197		−1.5%
1920	176		−10.7%
1930	168		−4.5%
1940	192		14.3%
1950	185		−3.6%
1960	150		−18.9%
1970	120		−20.0%
1980	120		0.0%
1990	136		13.3%
2000	112		−17.6%
2010	128		14.3%
2020	99		−22.7%
U.S. Decennial Census

=== 2010 census ===
As of the census of 2010, there were 128 people, 45 households, and 37 families living in the town. The population density was 123.1 inhabitants per square mile (47.5/km^{2}). There were 50 housing units at an average density of 48.1 per square mile (18.6/km^{2}). The racial makeup of the town was 99.2% White and 0.8% from two or more races.

There were 45 households, of which 33.3% had children under the age of 18 living with them, 66.7% were married couples living together, 15.6% had a female householder with no husband present, and 17.8% were non-families. 13.3% of all households were made up of individuals, and 8.8% had someone living alone who was 65 years of age or older. The average household size was 2.84 and the average family size was 3.11.

The median age in the town was 41 years. 29.7% of residents were under the age of 18; 3.9% were between the ages of 18 and 24; 19.6% were from 25 to 44; 28.2% were from 45 to 64; and 18.8% were 65 years of age or older. The gender makeup of the town was 49.2% male and 50.8% female.

=== 2000 census ===
As of the census of 2000, there were 112 people, 45 households, and 31 families living in the town. The population density was 107.2 inhabitants per square mile (41.4/km^{2}). There were 50 housing units at an average density of 47.9 per square mile (18.5/km^{2}). The racial makeup of the town was 99.11% White, and 0.89% from two or more races.

There were 45 households, out of which 15.6% had children under the age of 18 living with them, 57.8% were married couples living together, 11.1% had a female householder with no husband present, and 31.1% were non-families. 20.0% of all households were made up of individuals, and 6.7% had someone living alone who was 65 years of age or older. The average household size was 2.49 and the average family size was 2.87.

In the town, the population was spread out, with 17.9% under the age of 18, 8.9% from 18 to 24, 27.7% from 25 to 44, 33.0% from 45 to 64, and 12.5% who were 65 years of age or older. The median age was 42 years. For every 100 females, there were 89.8 males. For every 100 females age 18 and over, there were 95.7 males.

The median income for a household in the town was $32,321, and the median income for a family was $36,250. Males had a median income of $30,833 versus $22,500 for females. The per capita income for the town was $14,233. There were 8.3% of families and 11.2% of the population living below the poverty line, including 35.0% of under eighteens and none of those over 64.

== Notable people ==
- Everett Dean - college men's basketball and baseball coach, member of Hall of Fame; born in Livonia.
- WAP Martin - American Presbyterian missionary to China and translator; born in Livonia.
