= Hitchcock, Indiana =

- Unincorporated community
- Washington County's location in Indiana

- Location of Hitchcock in Washington County
- Coordinates: 38°38′18″N 86°10′10″W
- Country: United States
- State: Indiana
- County: Washington
- Township: Washington
- Elevation: 856 ft (261 m)
- Time zone: UTC-5 (Eastern (EST))
  - Summer (DST): UTC-4 (EDT)
- ZIP code: 47167
- Area codes: 812, 930
- GNIS feature ID: 452924

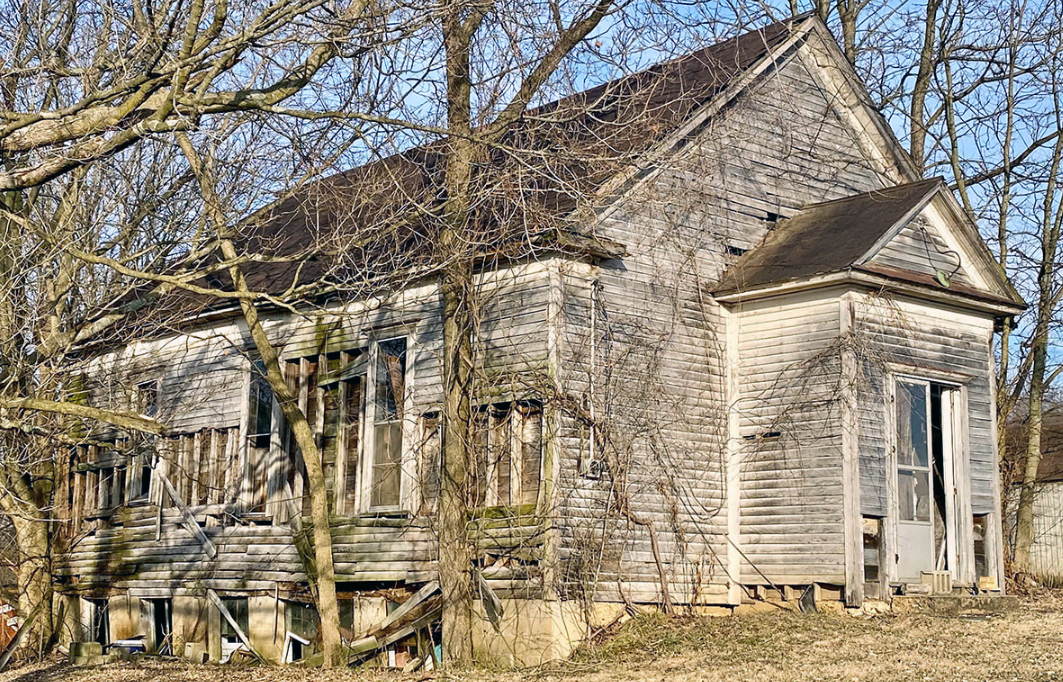
Mt. Zion Church

Hitchcock is an unincorporated community in Washington Township, Washington County, Indiana, United States.

== History ==
Hitchcock was named for the local Hitchcock family, including William Hitchcock, who established the first store in the community. Hitchcock had a general store, post office (established in 1858) and millinery shop, all housed in one two-story building, managed by the Clarence Dennis family, until 1952.

The town of Hitchcock is shown on many early maps as "Oxonia", and was a station along the Monon Railroad, receiving mail delivered by the train four times a day up until the 1930s. Hitchcock had a one-room schoolhouse, in use up to the 1950s, which still stands today. A major cultural center of the community was the Mt. Zion Methodist Church, now defunct (supplanted by nearby New Hope Methodist Church in 1970).

Other variant names for the community are Heffren, Hitchcock Station and Hitchcocks Station.

== Geography ==
Hitchcock is located at 38°38′18″N 86°10′10″W.
