= Rush Creek Valley, Indiana =

- Unincorporated community
- Washington County's location in Indiana

- Location of Rush Creek Valley in Washington County
- Coordinates: 38°41′43″N 86°10′14″W
- Country: United States
- State: Indiana
- County: Washington
- Township: Jefferson
- Elevation: 548 ft (167 m)
- Time zone: UTC-5 (Eastern (EST))
  - Summer (DST): UTC-4 (EDT)
- ZIP code: 47167
- Area codes: 812, 930
- GNIS feature ID: 442406

Rush Creek Valley is an unincorporated community in Jefferson Township, Washington County, in the U.S. state of Indiana.

== History ==
The first post office in Rush Creek Valley was established in 1871, and operated until it was discontinued in 1901.

== Geography ==
Rush Creek Valley is located at 38°41′43″N 86°10′14″W.
