= Highland, Washington County, Indiana =

Highland
- Unincorporated community
- Washington County's location in Indiana

- Location of Highland in Washington County
- Coordinates: 38°38′58″N 86°07′39″W
- Country: United States
- State: Indiana
- County: Washington
- Township: Washington
- Elevation: 833 ft (254 m)
- Time zone: UTC-5 (Eastern (EST))
  - Summer (DST): UTC-4 (EDT)
- ZIP code: 47167
- Area codes: 812, 930
- GNIS feature ID: 436147

Highland is an unincorporated community in Washington Township, Washington County, in the U.S. state of Indiana.

== Geography ==
Highland is located at 38°38′58″N 86°07′39″W.
