= Washington Township, Washington County, Indiana =

Washington Township
- Township
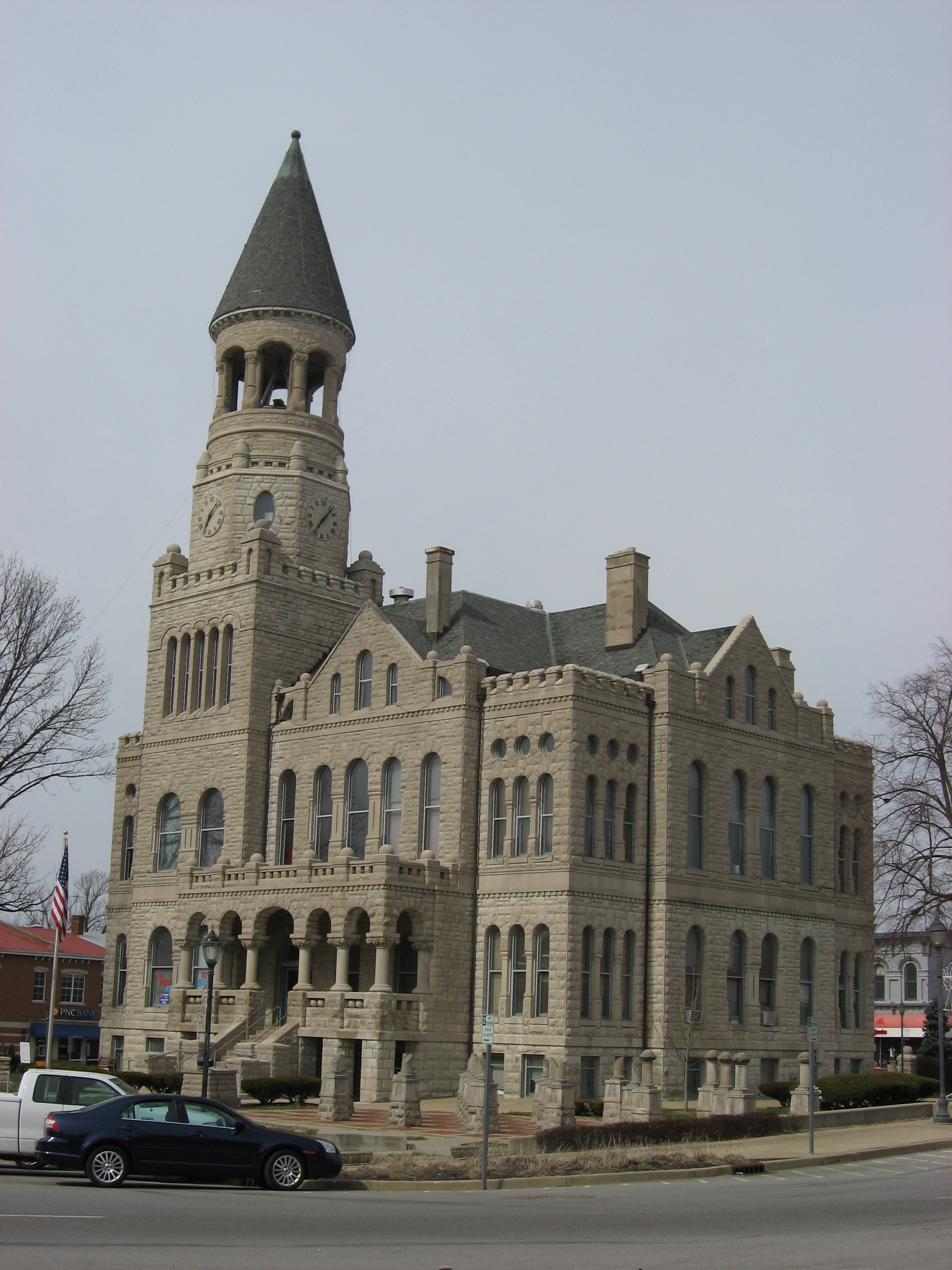
- The Washington County Courthouse in Salem

- Location in Washington County
- Coordinates: 38°36′49″N 86°06′07″W
- Country: United States
- State: Indiana
- County: Washington

Government
  - Type: Indiana township

Area
  - Total: 75.31 sq mi (195.1 km^{2})
  - Land: 74.95 sq mi (194.1 km^{2})
  - Water: 0.36 sq mi (0.93 km^{2}) 0.48%
- Elevation: 764 ft (233 m)

Population (2020)
  - Total: 10,506
  - Density: 140.2/sq mi (54.12/km^{2})
- ZIP code: 47167
- GNIS feature ID: 0454023
- Website: www.in.gov/townships/washington88/

Washington Township is one of thirteen townships in Washington County, Indiana, United States. As of the 2020 census, its population was 10,506 and it contained 4,662 housing units.

Historical population
Census	Pop.	Note	%±
1890	4,528		—
1900	4,552		0.5%
1910	4,573		0.5%
1920	4,961		8.5%
1930	5,563		12.1%
1940	5,613		0.9%
1950	5,770		2.8%
1960	7,046		22.1%
1970	8,025		13.9%
1980	8,883		10.7%
1990	9,495		6.9%
2000	9,955		4.8%
2010	10,176		2.2%
2020	10,506		3.2%
Source: US Decennial Census

== Geography ==
According to the 2010 census, the township has a total area of 75.31 square miles (195.1 km^{2}), of which 74.95 square miles (194.1 km^{2}) (or 99.52%) is land and 0.36 square miles (0.93 km^{2}) (or 0.48%) is water.

=== Cities, towns, villages ===
- Salem (the county seat)

=== Unincorporated towns ===
- Canton at 38.623947°N 86.034698°W
- Fair Acres at 38.604224°N 86.090255°W
- Harristown at 38.597836°N 86.024142°W
- Highland at 38.649501°N 86.127479°W
- Hitchcock at 38.638112°N 86.169703°W
- Martin Heights at 38.612557°N 86.108034°W
- McCol Place at 38.609224°N 86.114423°W

(This list is based on USGS data and may include former settlements.)

=== Adjacent townships ===
- Monroe Township (north)
- Gibson Township (northeast)
- Franklin Township (east)
- Polk Township (southeast)
- Pierce Township (south)
- Howard Township (southwest)
- Vernon Township (west)
- Jefferson Township (northwest)

=== Cemeteries ===
The township contains these fifteen cemeteries: Blue River Hicksite, Blue River Quaker Orthodox, Coggswell, Crown Hill, McKnight, Mt. Zion, New Philadelphia, Nicholson, Norris, Old Hebron, Paynter, Poor Farm, Stalker, Winslow and Wright.

=== Airports and landing strips ===
- Hardin Airport
- Salem Municipal Airport

== Education ==
- Salem Community Schools

Washington Township is served by the Salem-Washington Township Public Library.

== Political districts ==
- Indiana's 9th congressional district
- State House District 73
- State Senate District 44
