= Hardinsburg, Indiana =

- Town
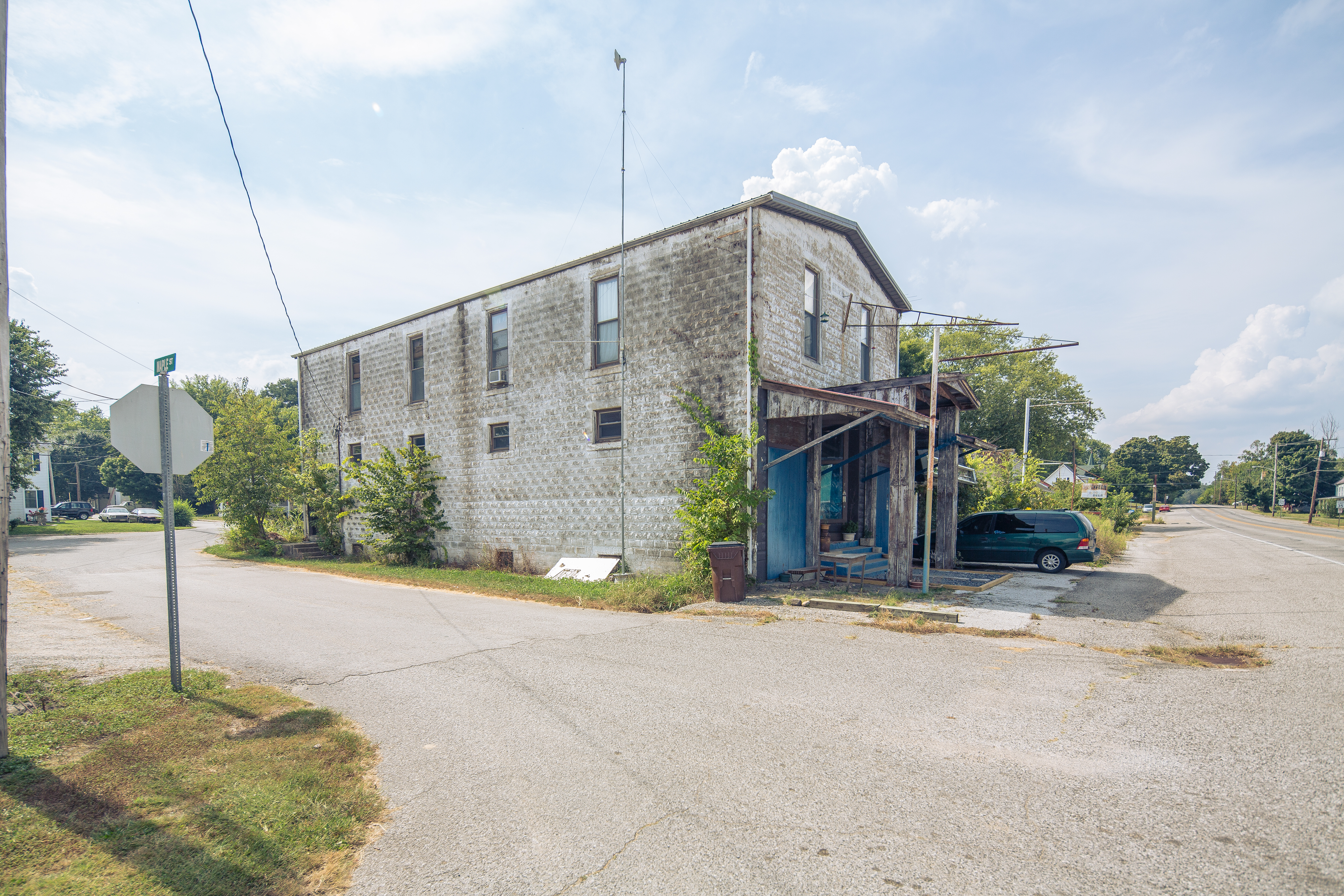

- Location of Hardinsburg in Washington County, Indiana.
- Coordinates: 38°27′43″N 86°16′24″W
- Country: United States
- State: Indiana
- County: Washington
- Township: Posey

Area
  - Total: 2.04 sq mi (5.28 km^{2})
  - Land: 2.03 sq mi (5.27 km^{2})
  - Water: 0.0039 sq mi (0.01 km^{2})
- Elevation: 689 ft (210 m)

Population (2020)
  - Total: 222
  - Density: 109.1/sq mi (42.12/km^{2})
- Time zone: UTC-5 (EST)
  - Summer (DST): UTC-5 (EST)
- ZIP code: 47125
- Area code: 812
- FIPS code: 18-31396
- GNIS feature ID: 2831214

Hardinsburg is a town in Posey Township, Washington County, in the U.S. state of Indiana. The population was 222 at the 2020 census.

== History ==
Hardinsburg was laid out in 1838 by Aaron Hardin, and named for him. Aaron Hardin operated the first store in Hardinsburg and had kept store for several years before the town was started. Hardinsburg was incorporated as a town in 1849. The town was situated directly on the historic Buffalo Trace (present day U.S. Highway 150) between the Ohio River at Louisville and the Wabash River at Vincennes, which saw countless settlers pass through on wagon trains heading westward.

The Hardinsburg post office has been in operation since 1838.

== Geography ==
According to the 2010 census, Hardinsburg has a total area of 2.03 square miles (5.26 km^{2}), all land.

== Demographics ==
Historical population
Census	Pop.	Note	%±
1870	199		—
1880	133		−33.2%
1890	138		3.8%
1900	210		52.2%
1910	254		21.0%
1920	253		−0.4%
1930	254		0.4%
1940	275		8.3%
1950	247		−10.2%
1960	218		−11.7%
1970	263		20.6%
1980	298		13.3%
1990	322		8.1%
2000	244		−24.2%
2010	248		1.6%
2020	222		−10.5%
U.S. Decennial Census

The United States Census Bureau redefined Hardinsburg as a census designated place in 2023.

=== 2010 census ===
As of the census of 2010, there were 248 people, 96 households, and 61 families living in the town. The population density was 121.6 inhabitants per square mile (47.0/km^{2}). There were 111 housing units at an average density of 54.4 per square mile (21.0/km^{2}). The racial makeup of the town was 100.0% White. Hispanic or Latino of any race were 0.4% of the population.

There were 96 households, of which 35.4% had children under the age of 18 living with them, 49.0% were married couples living together, 8.3% had a female householder with no husband present, 6.3% had a male householder with no wife present, and 36.5% were non-families. 30.2% of all households were made up of individuals, and 8.4% had someone living alone who was 65 years of age or older. The average household size was 2.58 and the average family size was 3.26.

The median age in the town was 37 years. 26.6% of residents were under the age of 18; 9% were between the ages of 18 and 24; 25.1% were from 25 to 44; 28.3% were from 45 to 64; and 11.3% were 65 years of age or older. The gender makeup of the town was 50.0% male and 50.0% female.

=== 2000 census ===
As of the census of 2000, there were 244 people, 99 households, and 66 families living in the town. The population density was 119.7 inhabitants per square mile (46.2/km^{2}). There were 105 housing units at an average density of 51.5 per square mile (19.9/km^{2}). The racial makeup of the town was 99.18% White, 0.82% from other races. Hispanic or Latino of any race were 4.10% of the population.

There were 99 households, out of which 38.4% had children under the age of 18 living with them, 45.5% were married couples living together, 15.2% had a female householder with no husband present, and 33.3% were non-families. 32.3% of all households were made up of individuals, and 17.2% had someone living alone who was 65 years of age or older. The average household size was 2.46 and the average family size was 3.09.

In the town, the population was spread out, with 33.2% under the age of 18, 4.1% from 18 to 24, 31.6% from 25 to 44, 18.9% from 45 to 64, and 12.3% who were 65 years of age or older. The median age was 35 years. For every 100 females, there were 89.1 males. For every 100 females age 18 and over, there were 85.2 males.

The median income for a household in the town was $23,125, and the median income for a family was $32,917. Males had a median income of $26,250 versus $22,813 for females. The per capita income for the town was $14,112. About 5.6% of families and 13.9% of the population were below the poverty line, including 21.7% of those under the age of eighteen and 20.0% of those 65 or over.

== Education ==
It is in the West Washington School Corporation.

== Notable people ==
- James A. Cravens (1818–1893), U.S. representative from Indiana

== See also ==
- List of census-designated places in Indiana
