= Kossuth, Indiana =

- Unincorporated community
- Washington County's location in Indiana

- Location of Kossuth in Washington County
- Coordinates: 38°42′16″N 86°06′08″W
- Country: United States
- State: Indiana
- County: Washington
- Township: Monroe
- Elevation: 879 ft (268 m)
- Time zone: UTC-5 (Eastern (EST))
  - Summer (DST): UTC-4 (EDT)
- ZIP code: 47281
- Area codes: 812, 930
- GNIS feature ID: 437446

Kossuth is an unincorporated community in Monroe Township, Washington County, in the U.S. state of Indiana.

== History ==
A post office was established at Kossuth in 1850, and remained in operation until it was discontinued in 1901.

== Geography ==
Kossuth is located at 38°42′16″N 86°06′08″W.
