= Smedley, Indiana =

- Unincorporated community
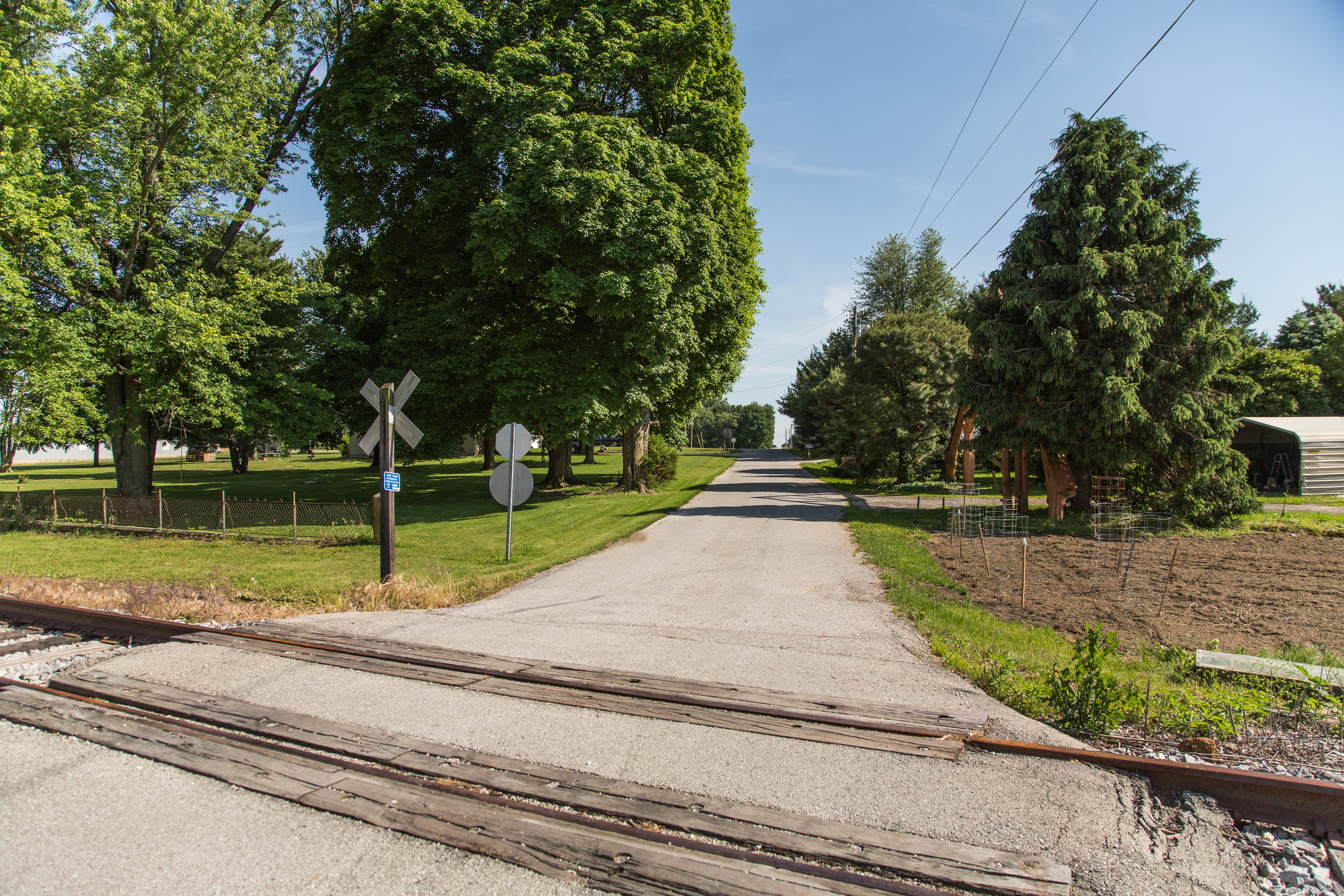

- Washington County's location in Indiana

- Location of Smedley in Washington County
- Coordinates: 38°37′59″N 86°12′57″W
- Country: United States
- State: Indiana
- County: Washington
- Township: Vernon
- Elevation: 879 ft (268 m)
- Time zone: UTC-5 (Eastern (EST))
  - Summer (DST): UTC-4 (EDT)
- ZIP code: 47108
- Area codes: 812, 930
- GNIS feature ID: 443654

Smedley is an unincorporated community in Vernon Township, Washington County, in the U.S. state of Indiana.

== History ==
Smedley was named for its first postmaster, Morgan Smedley. The post office was established there in 1849, soon after the railroad was built through that territory.

== Geography ==
Smedley is located at 38°37′59″N 86°12′57″W.
