= Fayetteville, Washington County, Indiana =

Fayetteville
- Unincorporated community
- Washington County's location in Indiana

- Location of Fayetteville in Washington County
- Coordinates: 38°27′04″N 86°15′43″W
- Country: United States
- State: Indiana
- County: Washington
- Township: Posey
- Elevation: 705 ft (215 m)
- Time zone: UTC-5 (Eastern (EST))
  - Summer (DST): UTC-4 (EDT)
- ZIP code: 47125
- Area codes: 812, 930
- GNIS feature ID: 451779

Fayetteville is an unincorporated community in Posey Township, Washington County, in the U.S. state of Indiana.

== Geography ==
Fayetteville is located at 38°27′04″N 86°15′43″W.
