= Jefferson Township, Washington County, Indiana =

Jefferson Township
- Township
- Location in Washington County
- Coordinates: 38°42′56″N 86°11′44″W
- Country: United States
- State: Indiana
- County: Washington

Government
  - Type: Indiana township

Area
  - Total: 48.74 sq mi (126.2 km^{2})
  - Land: 48.1 sq mi (125 km^{2})
  - Water: 0.64 sq mi (1.7 km^{2}) 1.31%
- Elevation: 551 ft (168 m)

Population (2020)
  - Total: 830
  - Density: 17/sq mi (6.7/km^{2})
- ZIP codes: 47108, 47167 47281
- GNIS feature ID: 0453501

Jefferson Township is one of thirteen townships in Washington County, Indiana, United States. As of the 2020 census, its population was 830.

Historical population
Census	Pop.	Note	%±
1890	1,448		—
1900	1,450		0.1%
1910	1,240		−14.5%
1920	1,047		−15.6%
1930	852		−18.6%
1940	932		9.4%
1950	684		−26.6%
1960	698		2.0%
1970	728		4.3%
1980	836		14.8%
1990	944		12.9%
2000	841		−10.9%
2010	920		9.4%
2020	830		−9.8%
Source: US Decennial Census

== Geography ==
According to the 2010 census, the township has a total area of 48.74 square miles (126.2 km^{2}), of which 48.1 square miles (125 km^{2}) (or 98.69%) is land and 0.64 square miles (1.7 km^{2}) (or 1.31%) is water.

=== Unincorporated towns ===
- Haleysbury at 38.741999°N 86.150814°W
- McKinley at 38.744777°N 86.210538°W
- Rush Creek Valley at 38.695333°N 86.170537°W

(This list is based on USGS data and may include former settlements.)

=== Adjacent townships ===
- Carr Township, Jackson County (north)
- Driftwood Township, Jackson County (northeast)
- Monroe Township (east)
- Washington Township (southeast)
- Vernon Township (southwest)
- Brown Township (west)

=== Cemeteries ===
The township contains these four cemeteries: Covenanter, Pollock, Thompson and Wheeler.

=== Lakes ===
- John Hays Lake

== School districts ==
- Salem Community Schools

== Political districts ==
- Indiana's 9th congressional district
- State House District 62
- State Senate District 44
