= Claysville, Indiana =

- Unincorporated community
- Washington County's location in Indiana

- Location of Claysville in Washington County
- Coordinates: 38°37′21″N 86°17′22″W
- Country: United States
- State: Indiana
- County: Washington
- Township: Vernon
- Elevation: 718 ft (219 m)
- Time zone: UTC-5 (Eastern)
  - Summer (DST): UTC-4 (EDT)
- ZIP code: 47108
- Area codes: 812, 930
- GNIS feature ID: 450779

Claysville is an unincorporated community in Vernon Township, Washington County, in the U.S. state of Indiana.

== History ==
Claysville was originally called Middletown, and under the latter name was laid out in 1828. When the first post office was established there in 1839, it was renamed Claysville. The post office operated until it was discontinued in 1906.

== Geography ==
Claysville is located at 38°37′21″N 86°17′22″W.
