= Polk Township, Washington County, Indiana =

Polk Township
- Township
- Location in Washington County
- Coordinates: 38°31′43″N 85°56′38″W
- Country: United States
- State: Indiana
- County: Washington

Government
  - Type: Indiana township

Area
  - Total: 35.99 sq mi (93.2 km^{2})
  - Land: 35.84 sq mi (92.8 km^{2})
  - Water: 0.15 sq mi (0.39 km^{2}) 0.42%
- Elevation: 768 ft (234 m)

Population (2020)
  - Total: 2,708
  - Density: 75.56/sq mi (29.17/km^{2})
- ZIP codes: 47106, 47126, 47165, 47167
- GNIS feature ID: 0453757

Polk Township is one of thirteen townships in Washington County, Indiana, United States. As of the 2020 census, its population was 2,708 and it contained 1,084 housing units.

Historical population
| Census | Pop. | Note | %± |
|---|---|---|---|
| 1890 | 919 | | — |
| 1900 | 1,111 | | 20.9% |
| 1910 | 1,035 | | −6.8% |
| 1920 | 986 | | −4.7% |
| 1930 | 1,092 | | 10.8% |
| 1940 | 1,236 | | 13.2% |
| 1950 | 1,177 | | −4.8% |
| 1960 | 1,362 | | 15.7% |
| 1970 | 1,384 | | 1.6% |
| 1980 | 1,682 | | 21.5% |
| 1990 | 1,863 | | 10.8% |
| 2000 | 2,394 | | 28.5% |
| 2010 | 2,626 | | 9.7% |
| 2020 | 2,708 | | 3.1% |
Source: US Decennial Census

== Geography ==
According to the 2010 census, the township has a total area of 35.99 square miles (93.2 km^{2}), of which 35.84 square miles (92.8 km^{2}) (or 99.58%) is land and 0.15 square miles (0.39 km^{2}) (or 0.42%) is water.

=== Cities, towns, villages ===
- New Pekin (east half)

=== Unincorporated towns ===
- Bartle at 38.560338°N 85.887470°W
- Blue River at 38.530060°N 85.939416°W
- Daisy Hill at 38.506172°N 85.939416°W
- Old Pekin at 38.497282°N 86.003307°W

(This list is based on USGS data and may include former settlements.)

=== Adjacent townships ===
- Franklin Township (north)
- Finley Township, Scott County (northeast)
- Monroe Township, Clark County (east)
- Wood Township, Clark County (south)
- Jackson Township (southwest)
- Pierce Township (west)
- Washington Township (northwest)

=== Cemeteries ===
The township contains these three cemeteries: Mead, Mount Pleasant and Tash.

== School districts ==
- East Washington School Corporation

== Political districts ==
- Indiana's 9th congressional district
- State House District 73
- State Senate District 45
