= Martinsburg, Indiana =

- Unincorporated community
- Washington County's location in Indiana

- Location in Washington County
- Coordinates: 38°26′38″N 86°01′34″W
- Country: United States
- State: Indiana
- County: Washington
- Township: Jackson
- Elevation: 820 ft (250 m)
- Time zone: UTC-5 (Eastern (EST))
  - Summer (DST): UTC-4 (EDT)
- ZIP code: 47165
- Area codes: 812, 930
- FIPS code: 18-47430
- GNIS feature ID: 438682

Martinsburg is an unincorporated community in Jackson Township, Washington County, in the U.S. state of Indiana.

== History ==
Martinsburg was founded in 1818 by Dr. Abner Martin, and named for him.

A post office was established at Martinsburg in 1830, and remained in operation until it was discontinued in 1919.

== Geography ==
Martinsburg is located at 38°26′38″N 86°01′34″W.

== Demographics ==
The United States Census Bureau defined Martinsburg as a census designated place in the 2022 American Community Survey.
