= McKinley, Indiana =

- Unincorporated community
- Washington County's location in Indiana

- Location of McKinley in Washington County
- Coordinates: 38°44′41″N 86°12′38″W
- Country: United States
- State: Indiana
- County: Washington
- Township: Jefferson
- Elevation: 761 ft (232 m)
- Time zone: UTC-5 (Eastern (EST))
  - Summer (DST): UTC-4 (EDT)
- ZIP code: 47108
- Area codes: 812, 930
- GNIS feature ID: 438896

McKinley is an unincorporated community in Jefferson Township, Washington County, in the U.S. state of Indiana.

== History ==
A post office was established at McKinley in 1891, and remained in operation until 1934. The community was likely named after president William McKinley.

== Geography ==
McKinley is located at 38°44′41″N 86°12′38″W.
