= Plattsburg, Indiana =

- Unincorporated community
- Washington County's location in Indiana

- Location in Washington County
- Coordinates: 38°43′10″N 86°05′23″W
- Country: United States
- State: Indiana
- County: Washington
- Township: Monroe
- Elevation: 863 ft (263 m)
- Time zone: UTC-5 (Eastern (EST))
  - Summer (DST): UTC-4 (EDT)
- ZIP code: 47167
- Area codes: 812, 930
- FIPS code: 18-60318
- GNIS feature ID: 441230

Plattsburg is an unincorporated community in Monroe Township, Washington County, in the U.S. state of Indiana.

== History ==
A post office was established at Plattsburg in 1844, but was soon discontinued, in 1845.

== Geography ==
Plattsburg is located at 38°43′10″N 86°05′23″W.
