= Jackson Township, Washington County, Indiana =

Jackson Township
- Township
- Location in Washington County
- Coordinates: 38°26′23″N 86°03′18″W
- Country: United States
- State: Indiana
- County: Washington

Government
  - Type: Indiana township

Area
  - Total: 25.48 sq mi (66.0 km^{2})
  - Land: 25.39 sq mi (65.8 km^{2})
  - Water: 0.09 sq mi (0.23 km^{2}) 0.35%
- Elevation: 751 ft (229 m)

Population (2020)
  - Total: 2,019
  - Density: 79.52/sq mi (30.70/km^{2})
- ZIP codes: 47106, 47164, 47165
- GNIS feature ID: 0453472

Jackson Township is one of thirteen townships in Washington County, Indiana, United States. As of the 2020 census, its population was 2,019 and it contained 832 housing units.

Historical population
Census	Pop.	Note	%±
1890	766		—
1900	779		1.7%
1910	707		−9.2%
1920	678		−4.1%
1930	631		−6.9%
1940	663		5.1%
1950	613		−7.5%
1960	588		−4.1%
1970	602		2.4%
1980	972		61.5%
1990	1,247		28.3%
2000	2,037		63.4%
2010	2,116		3.9%
2020	2,019		−4.6%
Source: US Decennial Census

== Geography ==
According to the 2010 census, the township has a total area of 25.48 square miles (66.0 km^{2}), of which 25.39 square miles (65.8 km^{2}) (or 99.65%) is land and 0.09 square miles (0.23 km^{2}) (or 0.35%) is water.

=== Unincorporated towns ===
- Martinsburg at 38.443951°N 86.026084°W

(This list is based on USGS data and may include former settlements.)

=== Adjacent townships ===
- Pierce Township (north)
- Polk Township (northeast)
- Wood Township, Clark County (east)
- Greenville Township, Floyd County (southeast)
- Morgan Township, Harrison County (southwest)
- Posey Township (west)
- Howard Township (northwest)

=== Cemeteries ===
The township contains four cemeteries: Goss, Hiestand, Martinsburg and Rickerd.

=== Lakes ===
- Palmyra Lake

== School districts ==
- East Washington School Corporation

== Political districts ==
- Indiana's 9th congressional district
- State House District 73
- State Senate District 47
