= Franklin Township, Washington County, Indiana =

Franklin Township
- Township
- Location in Washington County
- Coordinates: 38°36′04″N 85°56′39″W
- Country: United States
- State: Indiana
- County: Washington

Government
  - Type: Indiana township

Area
  - Total: 44.31 sq mi (114.8 km^{2})
  - Land: 44.25 sq mi (114.6 km^{2})
  - Water: 0.06 sq mi (0.16 km^{2}) 0.14%
- Elevation: 860 ft (262 m)

Population (2020)
  - Total: 2,442
  - Density: 55.19/sq mi (21.31/km^{2})
- Time zone: UTC-5 (EST)
  - Summer (DST): UTC-4 (EDT)
- ZIP codes: 47126, 47165, 47167
- Area code: 812
- GNIS feature ID: 0453315

Franklin Township is one of thirteen townships in Washington County, Indiana, United States. As of the 2020 census, its population was 2,442 and it contained 903 housing units.

Historical population
Census	Pop.	Note	%±
1890	1,313		—
1900	1,343		2.3%
1910	1,165		−13.3%
1920	1,039		−10.8%
1930	933		−10.2%
1940	962		3.1%
1950	1,066		10.8%
1960	1,049		−1.6%
1970	1,066		1.6%
1980	1,290		21.0%
1990	1,601		24.1%
2000	2,006		25.3%
2010	2,301		14.7%
2020	2,442		6.1%
Source: US Decennial Census

== Geography ==
According to the 2010 census, the township has a total area of 44.31 square miles (114.8 km^{2}), of which 44.25 square miles (114.6 km^{2}) (or 99.86%) is land and 0.06 square miles (0.16 km^{2}) (or 0.14%) is water.

=== Unincorporated towns ===
- Bunker Hill at 38.573671°N 85.894415°W
- New Philadelphia at 38.626447°N 85.969974°W
- New Salem at 38.621448°N 85.904138°W
- South Boston at 38.582837°N 85.979141°W

(This list is based on USGS data and may include former settlements.)

=== Adjacent townships ===
- Gibson Township (north)
- Finley Township, Scott County (northeast)
- Polk Township (south)
- Pierce Township (southwest)
- Washington Township (west)

=== Cemeteries ===
The township contains these five cemeteries: Beech Grove, Blue River Church, Bunker Hill, Conway, olive branch and Chestnut Hill.

== School districts ==
- East Washington School Corporation

== Political districts ==
- Indiana's 9th congressional district
- State House District 73
- State Senate District 45
