= Washington County, Indiana =

County in Indiana, United States

- County
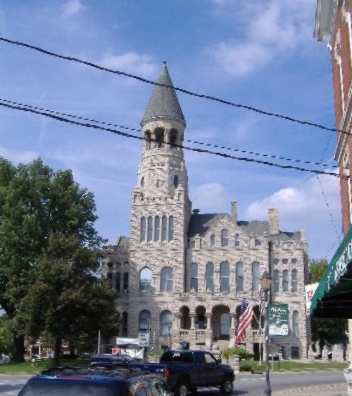
- Washington County Courthouse in Salem

- Seal

- Location within the U.S. state of Indiana
- Coordinates: 38°36′N 86°07′W
- Country: United States
- State: Indiana
- Founded: 1814
- Named for: George Washington
- Seat: Salem
- Largest city: Salem

Area
  - Total: 516.60 sq mi (1,338.0 km^{2})
  - Land: 513.72 sq mi (1,330.5 km^{2})
  - Water: 2.87 sq mi (7.4 km^{2}) 0.56%

Population (2020)
  - Total: 28,182
  - Estimate (2025): 28,383 ▲
  - Density: 55/sq mi (21/km^{2})
- Time zone: UTC−5 (Eastern)
  - Summer (DST): UTC−4 (EDT)
- Congressional district: 9th
- Website: www.washingtoncounty.in.gov
- Indiana county number 88

Washington County is a county in the U.S. state of Indiana. As of the 2020 United States census, the population was 28,182. The county seat (and the county's only incorporated city) is Salem. Washington County is part of the Louisville metropolitan area.

== History ==
In 1787, the fledgling United States defined the Northwest Territory, which included the area of present-day Indiana. In 1800, Congress separated Ohio from the Northwest Territory, designating the rest of the land as the Indiana Territory. President Thomas Jefferson chose William Henry Harrison as the territory's first governor, and Vincennes was established as the territorial capital. After the Michigan Territory was separated and the Illinois Territory was formed, Indiana was reduced to its current size and geography.

In 1790, Knox County was laid out. In 1801, Clark County was established, and in 1808 Harrison County was laid out, including the territory of the future Washington County.

Starting in 1794, Native American titles to Indiana lands were extinguished by usurpation, purchase, or war and treaty. The United States acquired land from the Native Americans in the Treaty of Grouseland (1805), by which a large portion of the southern Indiana Territory became property of the government. This included the future Washington County. As early as 1802, a man named Frederick Royce lived among the Ox Indians at a place known as the Lick, two miles east of Salem and is probably the first white man to inhabit this county. He was a hunter-trader and salt manufacturer. In 1803, Thomas Hopper settled in this county near Hardinsburg. Washington County was created by act of the Territorial legislature dated December 21, 1813, taking territory from Harrison and Clark counties. Interim commissioners were named and directed to determine the proper choice of the seat of government. Accordingly, they began deliberating in January 1814, and by February 2 had selected an uninhabited site near the center, naming it 'Salem'. In the territorial act creating the county, it was named for U.S. President George Washington, who had died fourteen years earlier.

On September 1, 1814, the original boundary of Washington County was increased, by act of the Territorial legislature, but on December 26, 1815, much of this added territory was partitioned off to create Orange and Jackson counties. In December 1816 the Indiana Territory was admitted to the Union as a state. On January 12, 1820, the state partitioned a further portion of Washington County to create Scott County. In 1842, and again in 1873, the border between Scott and Washington counties was adjusted.

In 1808, the first Black settlers arrived in the area along with white Quakers. In 1815 they established the Blue River Meeting House northeast of Salem. By 1850, 252 Black people had settled in the county, mainly living in Posey and Washington townships. The passing into law in 1851 of a new state constitution, in which, Article 13 excluded further settlement of Black and mixed-race persons was indicative of increasing hostility towards this population and saw a decline in Black residents of the county to 187 by 1860. In Posey Township, the population of 90 Black people in 1850 had decreased to zero by 1860.

Whitecapping, the process by which rural citizens used threats or extralegal violence to force Black people out of the region, continued in Washington County during the Civil War. In December 1864, John Williams, a prosperous Black farmer in the county, was shot dead in the doorway of his home. In 1867, Alexander White, an elderly man, was stabbed to death in Salem after repeatedly ignoring the threats of white attendees to quit coming to their church. These lynchings convinced people the county was not safe and contributed to a continual exodus of Black people from the county. In 1870, 18 Black people remained in the county, and by 1880 only three remained.

Salem, the county seat, had become a sundown town by 1898 at the latest. By the 20th century the entire county was officially sundown. A county history from 1916 declared that, "Washington County has for several decades boasted that no colored man or woman lived within her borders." Sundown signs existed in the county, with one located near Canton, east of Salem. Law enforcement would not allow Black people to stop in Salem, and would escort them to the county line. Washington County remained sundown until 1990 at the latest, when 15 Black people were recorded living in Salem on that year's census.

== Geography ==
The low rolling hills of Washington County were tree-covered before settlement, but have been largely cleared and devoted to agriculture, although drainage areas are still wooded. The north portion of the county is drained by the Muscatatuck River, which forms the eastern portion of the county's north border. The East Fork of the White River joins the Muscatatuck near the center of the county's north line. The south part of the county is drained by the Blue River, which rises in the county and flows southwestward into Harrison County on its way to the Ohio River. The highest point on the terrain (1,050 feet (320 meters) ASL) is an isolated rise two miles (3.2 km) NNW from New Philadelphia in the eastern part.

According to the 2010 census, the county has a total area of 516.60 square miles (1,338.0 km^{2}), of which 513.72 square miles (1,330.5 km^{2}) (or 99.44%) is land and 2.87 square miles (7.4 km^{2}) (or 0.56%) is water.

=== Adjacent counties ===
- Jackson County − north
- Scott County − northeast
- Clark County − east
- Floyd County − southeast
- Harrison County − south
- Crawford County − southwest
- Orange County − west
- Lawrence County − northwest

=== City ===
- Salem

=== Towns ===
- Campbellsburg
- Hardinsburg
- Little York
- Livonia
- New Pekin
- Saltillo

=== Census-designated place ===
- Fredericksburg

=== Unincorporated communities ===
- Bartle
- Beck's Mill
- Blue River
- Canton
- Claysville
- Daisy Hill
- Farabee
- Fayetteville
- Georgetown
- Gooseport
- Haleysburg
- Harristown
- Highland
- Hitchcock
- Kossuth
- Martinsburg
- McKinley
- Millport
- Mount Carmel
- New Liberty
- New Philadelphia
- New Salem
- Old Pekin
- Organ Springs
- Plattsburg
- Pumpkin Center
- Rush Creek Valley
- Smedley
- South Boston

=== Townships ===
- Brown
- Franklin
- Gibson
- Howard
- Jackson
- Jefferson
- Madison
- Monroe
- Pierce
- Polk
- Posey
- Vernon
- Washington

=== Transit ===
- Southern Indiana Transit System

=== Major highways ===
- U.S. Route 150
- Indiana State Road 39
- Indiana State Road 56
- Indiana State Road 60
- Indiana State Road 66
- Indiana State Road 135
- Indiana State Road 160
- Indiana State Road 256
- Indiana State Road 335
- Indiana State Road 337

== Climate and weather ==
Salem, Indiana

Climate chart (precipitation, max. and min. temperature)
J	F	M	A	M	J	J	A	S	O	N	D
3.3 39 21	3.2 46 25	4.3 56 33	4.6 67 42	4.9 76 51	3.9 84 60	4.4 87 64	4 86 62	3.1 79 55	2.9 68 44	3.9 55 36	3.7 44 26
- █ Average max. and min. temperatures in °F
- █ Precipitation totals in inches
- Source: The Weather Channel
Metric conversion
J	F	M	A	M	J	J	A	S	O	N	D
85 4 −6	81 8 −4	109 13 1	117 19 6	123 24 11	100 29 16	112 31 18	101 30 17	78 26 13	73 20 7	99 13 2	94 7 −3
- █ Average max. and min. temperatures in °C
- █ Precipitation totals in mm

In recent years, average temperatures in Salem have ranged from a low of 21 °F (−6 °C) in January to a high of 87 °F (31 °C) in July, although a record low of −32 °F (−36 °C) was recorded in February 1951 and a record high of 105 °F (41 °C) was recorded in July 1954. Average monthly precipitation ranged from 2.87 inches (73 mm) in October to 4.86 inches (123 mm) in May.

Five people were reported killed in Washington County during the tornado outbreak of March 2–3, 2012. Four were found dead in a home on Old Pekin Road according to Washington County officials. The fifth, a 15-month-old from the same family, had been found in a field, and died later in hospital.

== Demographics ==
Historical population
Census	Pop.	Note	%±
1820	9,039		—
1830	13,064		44.5%
1840	15,269		16.9%
1850	17,040		11.6%
1860	17,909		5.1%
1870	18,495		3.3%
1880	18,955		2.5%
1890	18,619		−1.8%
1900	19,409		4.2%
1910	17,445		−10.1%
1920	16,645		−4.6%
1930	16,285		−2.2%
1940	17,008		4.4%
1950	16,520		−2.9%
1960	17,819		7.9%
1970	19,278		8.2%
1980	21,932		13.8%
1990	23,717		8.1%
2000	27,223		14.8%
2010	28,262		3.8%
2020	28,182		−0.3%
2025 (est.)	28,383	▲	0.7%
US Decennial Census; 1790-1960 1900-1990; 1990-2000 2010

=== Racial and ethnic composition ===
Washington County, Indiana – Racial and ethnic composition Note: the US Census treats Hispanic/Latino as an ethnic category. This table excludes Latinos from the racial categories and assigns them to a separate category. Hispanics/Latinos may be of any race.
Race / Ethnicity (NH = Non-Hispanic)	Pop 1980	Pop 1990	Pop 2000	Pop 2010	Pop 2020	% 1980	% 1990	% 2000	% 2010	% 2020
White alone (NH)	21,782	23,548	26,749	27,539	26,600	99.32%	99.29%	98.26%	97.44%	94.39%
Black or African American alone (NH)	7	22	36	63	113	0.03%	0.09%	0.13%	0.22%	0.40%
Native American or Alaska Native alone (NH)	13	23	35	45	66	0.06%	0.10%	0.13%	0.16%	0.23%
Asian alone (NH)	22	14	43	86	95	0.10%	0.06%	0.16%	0.30%	0.34%
Native Hawaiian or Pacific Islander alone (NH)	x	x	2	2	10	x	x	0.01%	0.01%	0.04%
Other race alone (NH)	9	2	16	25	67	0.04%	0.01%	0.06%	0.09%	0.24%
Mixed race or Multiracial (NH)	x	x	142	198	831	x	x	0.52%	0.70%	2.95%
Hispanic or Latino (any race)	99	108	200	304	400	0.45%	0.46%	0.73%	1.08%	1.42%
Total	21,932	23,717	27,223	28,262	28,182	100.00%	100.00%	100.00%	100.00%	100.00%

=== 2020 census ===
As of the 2020 census, the county had a population of 28,182. The median age was 41.7 years. 23.1% of residents were under the age of 18 and 17.7% of residents were 65 years of age or older. For every 100 females there were 100.5 males, and for every 100 females age 18 and over there were 99.3 males age 18 and over.

The racial makeup of the county was 95.1% White, 0.4% Black or African American, 0.3% American Indian and Alaska Native, 0.3% Asian, <0.1% Native Hawaiian and Pacific Islander, 0.5% from some other race, and 3.4% from two or more races. Hispanic or Latino residents of any race comprised 1.4% of the population.

23.5% of residents lived in urban areas, while 76.5% lived in rural areas.

There were 11,031 households in the county, of which 30.7% had children under the age of 18 living in them. Of all households, 51.8% were married-couple households, 17.9% were households with a male householder and no spouse or partner present, and 22.7% were households with a female householder and no spouse or partner present. About 25.5% of all households were made up of individuals and 11.1% had someone living alone who was 65 years of age or older.

There were 12,093 housing units, of which 8.8% were vacant. Among occupied housing units, 78.9% were owner-occupied and 21.1% were renter-occupied. The homeowner vacancy rate was 1.5% and the rental vacancy rate was 8.0%.

=== 2010 census ===
As of the 2010 United States census, there were 28,262 people, 10,850 households, and 7,799 families in the county. The population density was 55.0 inhabitants per square mile (21.2/km^{2}). There were 12,220 housing units at an average density of 23.8 per square mile (9.2/km^{2}). The racial makeup of the county was 98.1% white, 0.3% Asian, 0.2% American Indian, 0.2% black or African American, 0.3% from other races, and 0.9% from two or more races. Those of Hispanic or Latino origin made up 1.1% of the population. In terms of ancestry, 25.2% were German, 14.3% were American, 13.7% were Irish, and 9.6% were English.

Of the 10,850 households, 34.7% had children under the age of 18 living with them, 54.8% were married couples living together, 11.1% had a female householder with no husband present, 28.1% were non-families, and 23.7% of all households were made up of individuals. The average household size was 2.58 and the average family size was 3.02. The median age was 39.2 years.

The median income for a household in the county was $47,697 and the median income for a family was $45,500. Males had a median income of $38,100 versus $28,092 for females. The per capita income for the county was $19,278. About 12.2% of families and 16.9% of the population were below the poverty line, including 24.7% of those under age 18 and 14.9% of those age 65 or over.

== Government ==
United States presidential election results for Washington County, Indiana
Year	Republican		Democratic		Third party(ies)	
Year	No.	%	No.	%	No.	%
1888	1,847	43.38%	2,389	56.11%	22	0.52%
1892	1,833	41.30%	2,322	52.32%	283	6.38%
1896	2,214	45.52%	2,613	53.72%	37	0.76%
1900	2,152	43.71%	2,723	55.31%	48	0.98%
1904	2,094	45.35%	2,364	51.20%	159	3.44%
1908	1,976	42.58%	2,573	55.44%	92	1.98%
1912	712	17.00%	2,233	53.31%	1,244	29.70%
1916	1,871	42.80%	2,414	55.23%	86	1.97%
1920	3,708	46.86%	4,157	52.53%	48	0.61%
1924	3,479	46.37%	3,942	52.55%	81	1.08%
1928	3,835	51.96%	3,518	47.66%	28	0.38%
1932	3,316	40.53%	4,809	58.78%	56	0.68%
1936	3,690	43.50%	4,766	56.19%	26	0.31%
1940	4,216	48.37%	4,471	51.30%	29	0.33%
1944	4,033	50.32%	3,940	49.16%	42	0.52%
1948	3,660	47.18%	4,033	51.99%	64	0.83%
1952	4,849	55.45%	3,844	43.96%	52	0.59%
1956	4,864	55.66%	3,849	44.04%	26	0.30%
1960	5,057	56.74%	3,821	42.87%	35	0.39%
1964	3,598	41.97%	4,943	57.66%	32	0.37%
1968	3,891	48.61%	2,936	36.68%	1,177	14.71%
1972	4,758	60.06%	3,086	38.95%	78	0.98%
1976	3,794	45.61%	4,409	53.01%	115	1.38%
1980	5,234	56.30%	3,663	39.40%	400	4.30%
1984	5,874	62.62%	3,334	35.54%	172	1.83%
1988	4,998	59.39%	3,370	40.04%	48	0.57%
1992	4,043	40.20%	4,092	40.69%	1,922	19.11%
1996	4,066	44.14%	3,819	41.46%	1,326	14.40%
2000	5,868	59.87%	3,675	37.50%	258	2.63%
2004	6,915	63.56%	3,879	35.65%	86	0.79%
2008	6,519	57.43%	4,562	40.19%	271	2.39%
2012	6,533	60.85%	3,909	36.41%	295	2.75%
2016	8,209	72.12%	2,636	23.16%	537	4.72%
2020	9,114	75.08%	2,784	22.93%	241	1.99%
2024	9,739	76.55%	2,764	21.72%	220	1.73%

The county government is a constitutional body, and is granted specific powers by the Constitution of Indiana, and by the Indiana Code.

County Council: The legislative branch of the county government; controls spending and revenue collection in the county. Representatives are elected to four-year terms from county districts. They set salaries, the annual budget, and special spending. The council has limited authority to impose local taxes, in the form of an income and property tax that is subject to state level approval, excise taxes, and service taxes.

Board of Commissioners: The executive body of the county; commissioners are elected county-wide, to staggered four-year terms. One commissioner serves as president. The commissioners execute the acts legislated by the council, collect revenue, and manage the county government.

Court: There are two judges in Washington County. The Judge of the Circuit Court is the Hon. Larry Medlock (R). The Judge of the Superior Court is the Hon. Dustin Houchin. (R). Case distribution is determined by local court rules. Each judge serves a six-year term.

County Officials: The county has other elected offices, including sheriff, coroner, auditor, treasurer, recorder, surveyor, and circuit court clerk. These officers are elected to four-year terms. Members elected to county government positions are required to declare party affiliations and to be residents of the county.

Washington County Sheriff's Department

Jurisdictional structure
- Operations jurisdiction: Washington, Indiana, United States
- Legal jurisdiction: As per operations jurisdiction
- General nature: Local civilian police

Operational structure
- Agency executive: Claude Combs, Sheriff

Washington County is part of Indiana's 9th congressional district and is represented in Congress by Republican Erin Houchin.

== Education ==
The county is served by three school districts:

- Salem Community Schools
- East Washington School Corporation
- West Washington School Corporation

There is also South Central Area Special Ed.

East Washington School Corporation (Superintendent:Steve Darnell) includes:

- East Washington Elementary School
- East Washington Middle School
- Eastern High School

Salem Community Schools (Superintendent:Luke Dean) includes:

- Salem High School
- Salem Middle School
- Bradie Shrum Elementary School

West Washington School Corporation (Superintendent:Gerald Jackson) includes:)

- West Washington Elementary School
- West Washington Junior/Senior High School

== See also ==
- List of sundown towns in the United States
- Louisville-Jefferson County, KY-IN Metropolitan Statistical Area
- Louisville/Jefferson County–Elizabethtown–Bardstown, KY-IN Combined Statistical Area
- National Register of Historic Places listings in Washington County, Indiana
