= Bartle, Indiana =

Unincorporated community in Indiana

- Unincorporated community
- Washington County's location in Indiana

- Location of Bartle in Washington County, Indiana, along the Blue River
- Coordinates: 38°33′39″N 85°53′17″W
- Country: United States
- State: Indiana
- County: Washington
- Township: Polk
- Elevation: 778 ft (237 m)
- Time zone: UTC-5 (Eastern (EST))
  - Summer (DST): UTC-4 (EDT)
- ZIP code: 47165
- Area codes: 812, 930
- GNIS feature ID: 446743

Bartle is an unincorporated community in Polk Township, Washington County, in the U.S. state of Indiana.

== History ==
A post office was established at Bartle in 1880, and remained in operation until it was discontinued in 1906. In 1900, the population was 18.

== Geography ==
Bartle is located in Washington County, Indiana along the Blue River at 38°33′39″N 85°53′17″W.
