= Pumpkin Center, Washington County, Indiana =

Pumpkin Center
- Unincorporated community
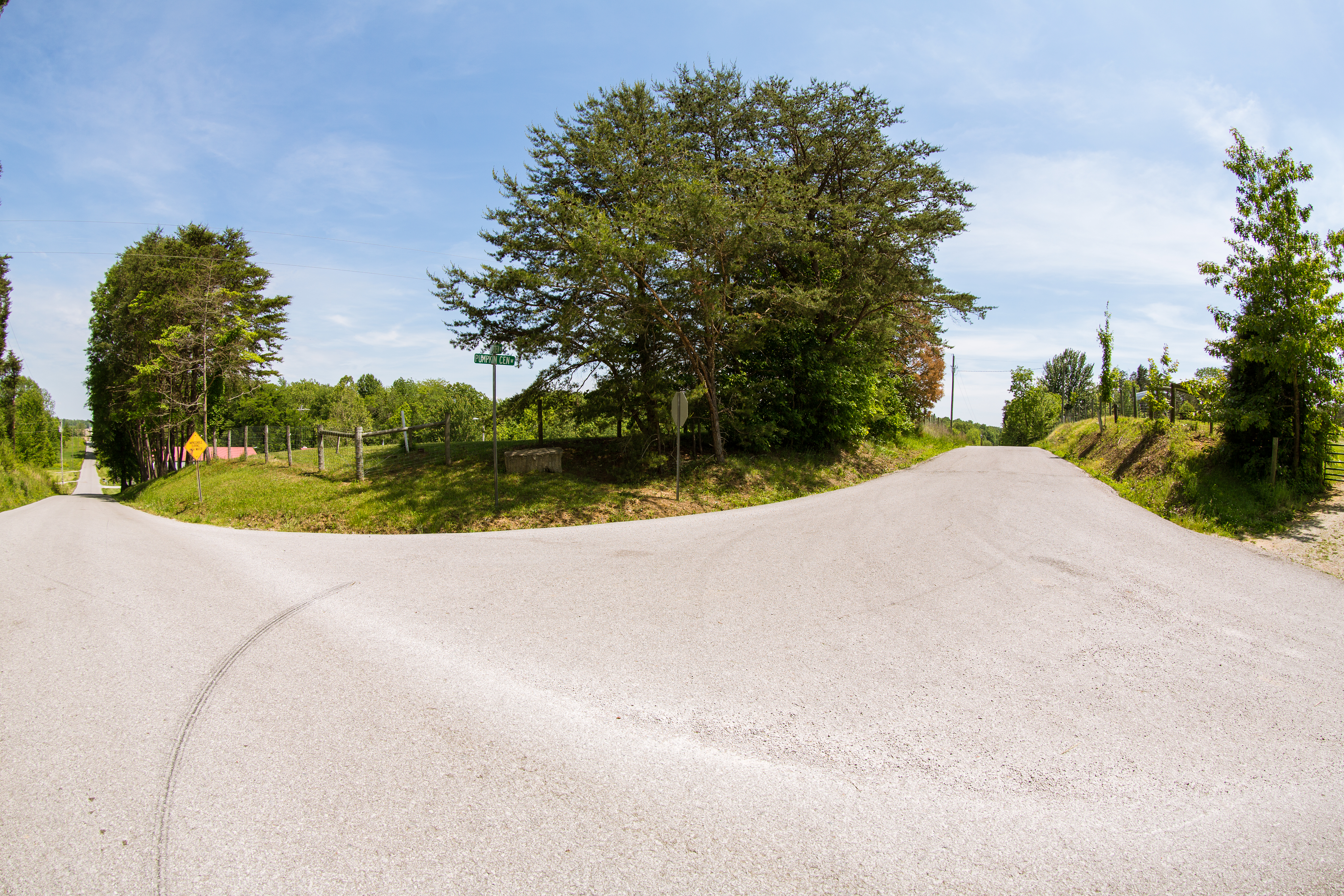

- Washington County's location in Indiana

- Location of Pumpkin Center in Washington County
- Coordinates: 38°42′18″N 85°57′00″W
- Country: United States
- State: Indiana
- County: Washington
- Township: Gibson
- Elevation: 607 ft (185 m)
- Time zone: UTC-5 (Eastern (EST))
  - Summer (DST): UTC-4 (EDT)
- ZIP code: 47170
- Area codes: 812, 930
- GNIS feature ID: 441643

Pumpkin Center is an unincorporated community in Gibson Township, Washington County, in the U.S. state of Indiana. The locale was first named around 1923 when a general store was founded by Elisha Fleenor, who already owned a sawmill at the site. A school also operated in the community. Most of the population had departed by the late 1990s, by which time the community was mostly dedicated to turkey farming and apple orchards.

The community is not to be confused with another Pumpkin Center located in nearby Orange County.
