= Little York, Indiana =

- Town
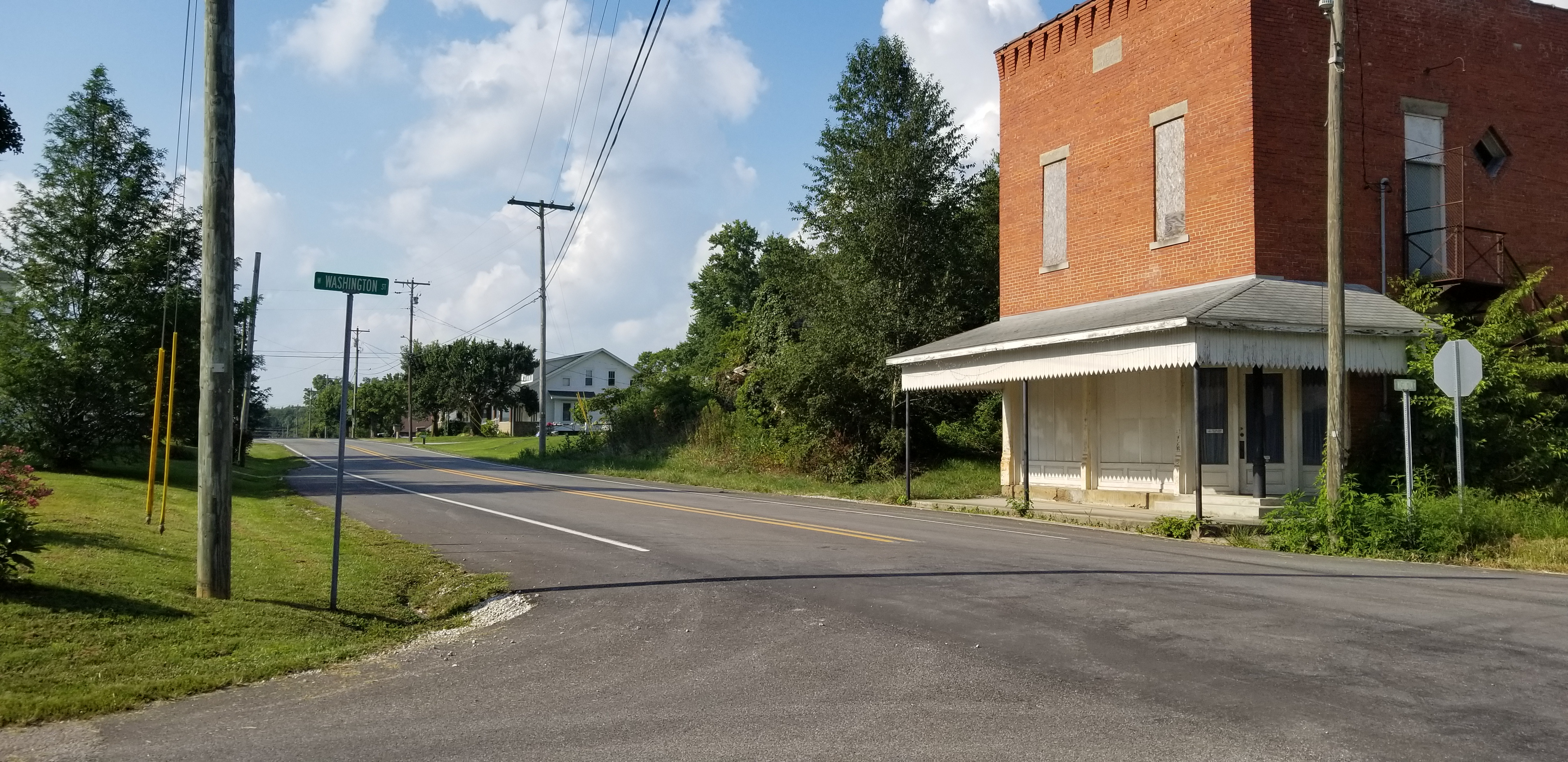

- Location of Little York in Washington County, Indiana.
- Coordinates: 38°41′58″N 85°54′16″W
- Country: United States
- State: Indiana
- County: Washington
- Township: Gibson

Area
  - Total: 0.98 sq mi (2.54 km^{2})
  - Land: 0.98 sq mi (2.54 km^{2})
  - Water: 0 sq mi (0.00 km^{2})
- Elevation: 568 ft (173 m)

Population (2020)
  - Total: 189
  - Density: 193.0/sq mi (74.53/km^{2})
- Time zone: UTC-5 (Eastern (EST))
  - Summer (DST): UTC-4 (EDT)
- ZIP code: 47170
- Area code: 812
- FIPS code: 18-44370
- GNIS feature ID: 2396719

Little York is a town in Gibson Township, Washington County, in the U.S. state of Indiana. As of the 2020 census, Little York had a population of 189.

== History ==
Little York was laid out and platted in 1831. Some of the early settlers being natives of the state of New York caused the name to be selected.

The Little York post office was in operation beginning in 1837, but now has their mail delivered from Scottsburg, IN. The building where the post office stood burned to the ground after a kitchen fire in the store.

== Geography ==
According to the 2010 census, Little York has a total area of 0.98 square miles (2.54 km^{2}), all land.

== Demographics ==
Historical population
Census	Pop.	Note	%±
1900	224		—
1910	195		−12.9%
1920	180		−7.7%
1930	140		−22.2%
1940	132		−5.7%
1950	146		10.6%
1960	180		23.3%
1970	191		6.1%
1980	150		−21.5%
1990	155		3.3%
2000	185		19.4%
2010	192		3.8%
2020	189		−1.6%
U.S. Decennial Census

=== 2010 census ===
As of the census of 2010, there were 192 people, 79 households, and 59 families living in the town. The population density was 195.9 inhabitants per square mile (75.6/km^{2}). There were 84 housing units at an average density of 85.7 per square mile (33.1/km^{2}). The racial makeup of the town was 97.9% White and 2.1% from two or more races. Hispanic or Latino of any race were 1.6% of the population.

There were 79 households, of which 30.4% had children under the age of 18 living with them, 55.7% were married couples living together, 7.6% had a female householder with no husband present, 11.4% had a male householder with no wife present, and 25.3% were non-families. 21.5% of all households were made up of individuals, and 11.4% had someone living alone who was 65 years of age or older. The average household size was 2.43 and the average family size was 2.71.

The median age in the town was 42.3 years. 21.9% of residents were under the age of 18; 4.7% were between the ages of 18 and 24; 28.6% were from 25 to 44; 30.2% were from 45 to 64; and 14.6% were 65 years of age or older. The gender makeup of the town was 51.0% male and 49.0% female.

=== 2000 census ===
As of the census of 2000, there were 185 people, 75 households, and 56 families living in the town. The population density was 189.3 inhabitants per square mile (73.1/km^{2}). There were 79 housing units at an average density of 80.8 per square mile (31.2/km^{2}). The racial makeup of the town was 100.00% White.

There were 75 households, out of which 33.3% had children under the age of 18 living with them, 64.0% were married couples living together, 8.0% had a female householder with no husband present, and 25.3% were non-families. 21.3% of all households were made up of individuals, and 12.0% had someone living alone who was 65 years of age or older. The average household size was 2.47 and the average family size was 2.86.

In the town, the population was spread out, with 22.7% under the age of 18, 8.6% from 18 to 24, 32.4% from 25 to 44, 23.8% from 45 to 64, and 12.4% who were 65 years of age or older. The median age was 38 years. For every 100 females, there were 101.1 males. For every 100 females age 18 and over, there were 93.2 males.

The median income for a household in the town was $42,500, and the median income for a family was $51,667. Males had a median income of $28,750 versus $28,125 for females. The per capita income for the town was $16,994. About 7.7% of families and 4.6% of the population were below the poverty line, including none of those under the age of eighteen and 20.8% of those 65 or over.
