= Harristown, Indiana =

- Unincorporated town
- Washington County's location in Indiana

- Location of Harristown in Washington County
- Coordinates: 38°35′52″N 86°01′27″W
- Country: United States
- State: Indiana
- County: Washington
- Township: Washington
- Elevation: 873 ft (266 m)
- Time zone: UTC-5 (Eastern (EST))
  - Summer (DST): UTC-4 (EDT)
- ZIP code: 47167
- Area codes: 812, 930
- GNIS feature ID: 435806

Harristown is an unincorporated town in Washington Township, Washington County, in the U.S. state of Indiana. It was laid out in 1850 by Thomas M. Harris, and named for him.It had a post office from 1851 to 1914.
