= Boggstown, Indiana =

- Unincorporated community and Census-designated place
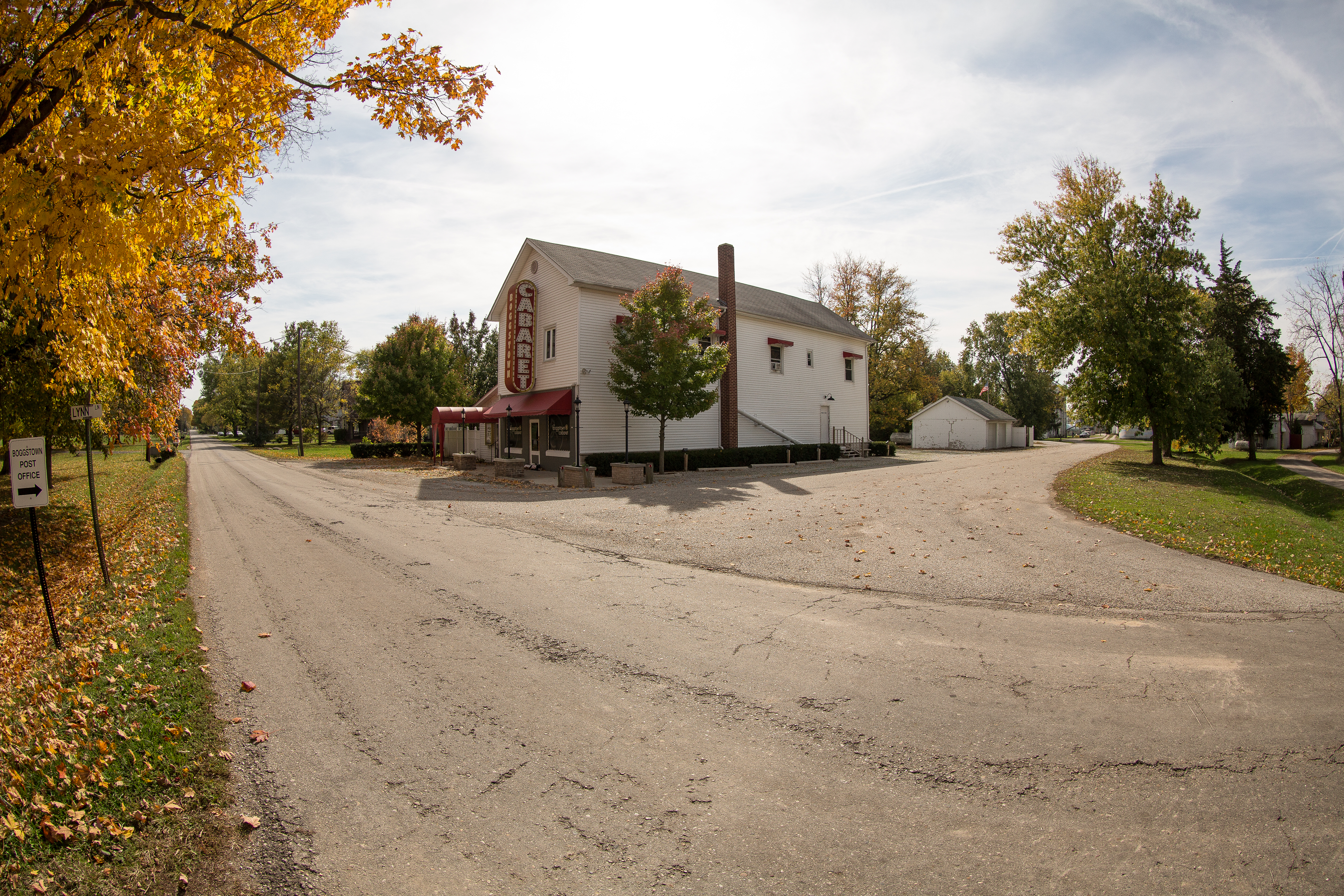

- Location within Indiana Location within the United States
- Coordinates: 39°33′46″N 85°54′44″W
- Country: United States
- State: Indiana
- County: Shelby
- Township: Sugar Creek
- Elevation: 755 ft (230 m)

Population (2000)
  - Total: Approx 400
- Time zone: UTC-5 (Eastern (EST))
  - Summer (DST): UTC-4 (EDT)
- ZIP code: 46110
- Area code: 317
- FIPS code: 18-6292
- GNIS feature ID: 2830526

Boggstown is an unincorporated community in Sugar Creek Township, Shelby County, in the U.S. state of Indiana.

== History ==
In early 1861, just before the Civil War, participants at a meeting in Boggstown approved a resolution to join the Confederacy in the event of hostilities. Whatever the reason for this resolution, it had no practical effect. The town remained loyal to the United States and the state of Indiana throughout the conflict, and local soldiers fought exclusively on the Union side.

The community was platted in 1867, and named for Joseph Boggs, an early settler. The Boggstown post office has been in operation since 1867.

Boggstown once contained a school which was discontinued at an unknown date.

== Demographics ==
The United States Census Bureau delineated Boggstown as a census designated place in the 2022 American Community Survey.

== Notable people ==
Actress Marjorie Main, best known as Ma Kettle, spent her teenage years here growing up on the first road north of town (300 North).

Eugene T. Robison WW2 Submarine Veteran Stationed aboard The USS Lagarto. Reported Missing in action. Ship was found in 2005. Still on watch.
