= National Register of Historic Places listings in Washington County, Indiana =

Location of Washington County in Indiana

This is a list of the National Register of Historic Places listings in Washington County, Indiana.

This is intended to be a complete list of the properties and districts on the National Register of Historic Places in Washington County, Indiana, United States. Latitude and longitude coordinates are provided for many National Register properties and districts; these locations may be seen together in an online map.

There are 11 properties and districts listed on the National Register in the county.

Properties and districts located in incorporated areas display the name of the municipality, while properties and districts in unincorporated areas display the name of their civil township. Properties and districts split between multiple jurisdictions display the names of all jurisdictions.

This National Park Service list is complete through NPS recent listings posted December 19, 2025.

== Current listings ==
	Name on the Register	Image	Date listed	Location	City or town	Description
1	Beck's Mill	Beck's Mill	December 7, 1990 (#90001789)	Beck's Mill Rd. at Mill Creek, southwest of Salem; 38°32′17″N 86°09′18″W	Howard Township	
2	Beck's Mill Bridge	Beck's Mill Bridge	September 20, 2007 (#07000981)	Carries Beck's Mill Road over Mill Creek, southwest of Salem; 38°32′14″N 86°09′16″W	Howard Township	
3	Blue River Friends Hicksite Meeting House and Cemetery		August 29, 2019 (#100005866)	1232 North Quaker Rd. 38°37′12″N 86°04′17″W	Washington Township	
4	Blue River Quaker Settlement Rural Historic District		May 19, 2025 (#100011859)	A corridor roughly lining Quaker Road north of State Road 56 to Trueblood Lane in Washington Township; 38°37′29″N 86°03′59″W	Washington Township	
5	Campbell-Gill House		August 29, 2019 (#100004365)	8178 S. IN 335; 38°29′12″N 86°01′07″W	New Pekin	
6	Cavanaugh Bridge	Cavanaugh Bridge	December 19, 2007 (#07001280)	0.6 miles south of County Road 700S on County Road 550W over the Muscatatuck River, southwest of Brownstown; 38°45′48″N 86°08′12″W	Jefferson Township	Extends into Jackson County
7	First Baptist Church	First Baptist Church	March 21, 1985 (#85000602)	201 N. High St. 38°36′25″N 86°05′58″W	Salem	
8	Hay-Morrison House	Hay-Morrison House	October 26, 1971 (#71000007)	106 S. College Ave. 38°36′19″N 86°05′50″W	Salem	
9	Salem Downtown Historic District	Salem Downtown Historic District	October 10, 1997 (#97001181)	Roughly bounded by Mulberry, Hackberry, and Hayes Sts., the CSX railroad tracks, and Brock Creek; 38°36′20″N 86°06′00″W	Salem	
10	Washington County Courthouse	Washington County Courthouse	June 16, 1980 (#80000047)	Public Sq. 38°36′20″N 86°06′03″W	Salem	
11	Washington County Jail and Sheriff's Residence	Washington County Jail and Sheriff's Residence	November 23, 1984 (#84000280)	106 S. Main St. 38°36′17″N 86°06′02″W	Salem	

== See also ==
- List of National Historic Landmarks in Indiana
- National Register of Historic Places listings in Indiana
- Listings in neighboring counties: Clark, Crawford, Floyd, Harrison, Jackson, Lawrence, Orange, Scott
- List of Indiana state historical markers in Washington County
- List of attractions and events in the Louisville metropolitan area
