= List of Indiana state historical markers in Washington County =

Location of Washington County in Indiana

This is a list of the Indiana state historical markers in Washington County.

This is intended to be a complete list of the official state historical markers placed in Washington County, Indiana, United States by the Indiana Historical Bureau. The locations of the historical markers and their latitude and longitude coordinates are included below when available, along with their names, years of placement, and topics as recorded by the Historical Bureau. There are 6 historical markers located in Washington County.

== Historical markers ==
Marker title	Image	Year placed	Location	Topics
Morgan's Raid July 8–13, 1863		1963	Southern side of the Washington County Courthouse in Salem; 38°36′20″N 86°6′3″W	Military
Brock Cemetery		1981	State Road 135 on the southwestern corner of the Brock Creek bridge, 0.5 miles north of Salem; 38°37′10″N 86°6′2″W	Cemetery, Early Settlement and Exploration
Illinoian Glacier Boundary		1995	Northeastern corner of the junction of State Road 135 and Lick Skillet Road, 8 miles north of Salem; 38°43′25″N 86°5′28″W	Nature and Natural Disasters
Washington County Courthouse/Salem Downtown Historic District		1998	Northern side of the Washington County Courthouse in Salem; 38°36′21″N 86°6′3″W	Historic District, Neighborhoods, and Towns, Buildings and Architecture, Government Institutions
Skirmish Near Pekin		2005	Near 5751 E. Greenbriar Road West, near Pekin; 38°30′58″N 86°0′4″W	Military
Sarah Parke Morrison		2021	Along N. Shelby St. between Salem High School and Ascension St. Vincent Salem Hospital, Salem; 38°36′44″N 86°06′27″W	Women, Education, Religion

== See also ==
- List of Indiana state historical markers
- National Register of Historic Places listings in Washington County, Indiana
