= Washington County Jail and Sheriff's Residence =

Washington County Jail and Sheriff's Residence may refer to:

- Washington County Jail and Sheriff's Residence (Salem, Indiana), listed on the NRHP in Indiana
- Washington County Jail and Sheriff's Residence (Washington, Kansas), listed on the NRHP in Kansas

== See also ==
- Washington County Jail (disambiguation)
