= Beck's Mill =

- U.S. National Register of Historic Places
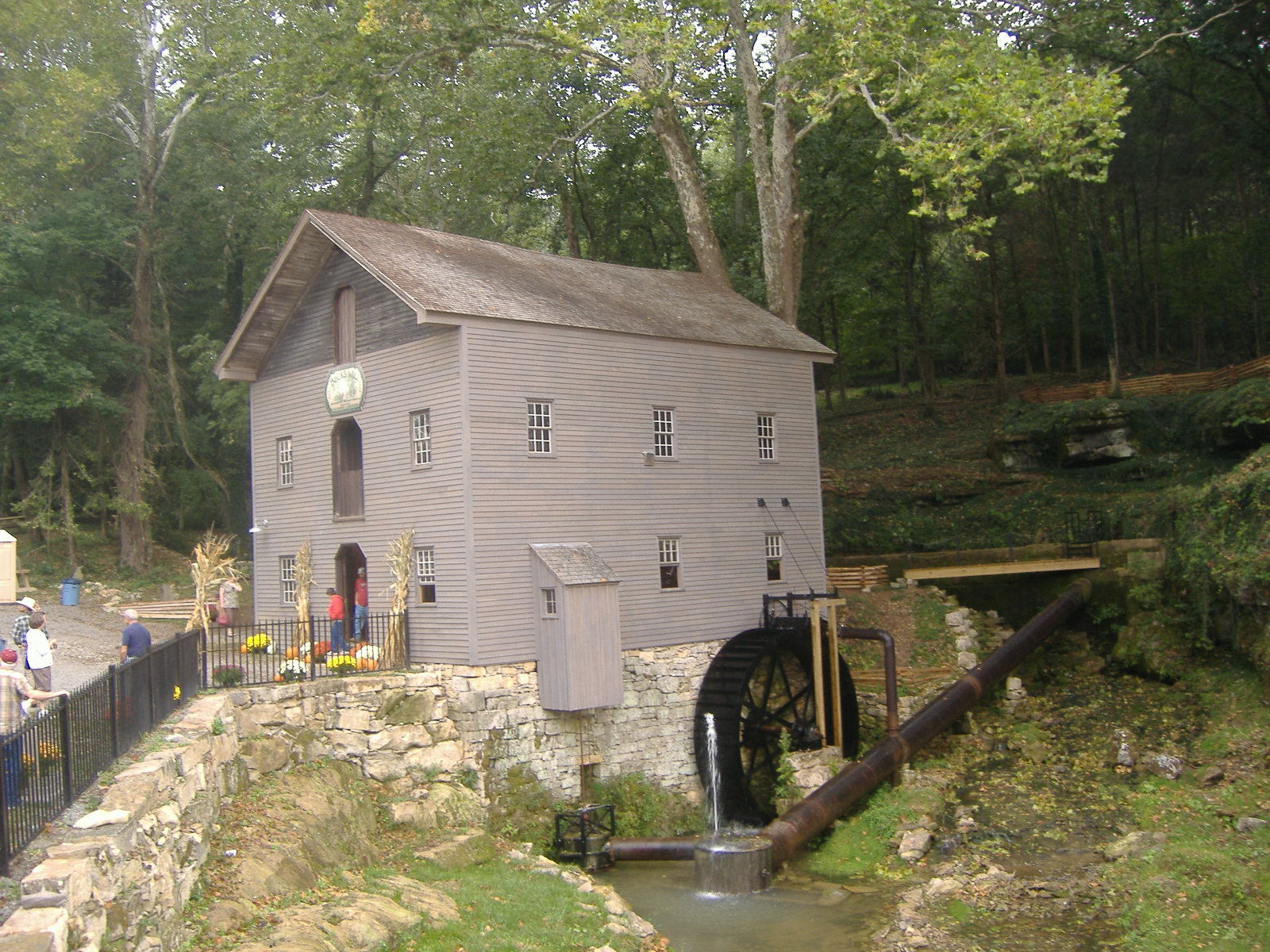
- Beck's Mill, after restoration

- Location within Washington County, Indiana Location within Indiana Location within the United States
- Location: Becks Mill, Indiana
- Coordinates: 38°32′16.75″N 86°9′18.04″W
- Area: 14 acres (57,000 m^{2})
- MPS: Grain Mills in Indiana MPS
- NRHP reference No.: 90001789
- Added to NRHP: December 7, 1990

Beck's Mill is a historic gristmill in Washington County, Indiana, in the United States. It is seven miles (11 km) southwest of Salem. It was built in 1808, rebuilt in 1864 after a fire, one year after John Hunt Morgan demanded ransom for every Washington County mill to be spared from burning. The mill was placed on the National Register of Historic Places in 1990. It was on the list of the Historic Landmarks Foundation of Indiana's 10 Most Endangered historic places in 2005 and 2006, but was not in 2007 because it received funding for its restoration.

== Geography ==
The mill is situated in a rocky ravine surrounded by sycamores and maples. It is at one of the highest elevations in Indiana, at 946 feet (288 m) above sea level.

== History ==
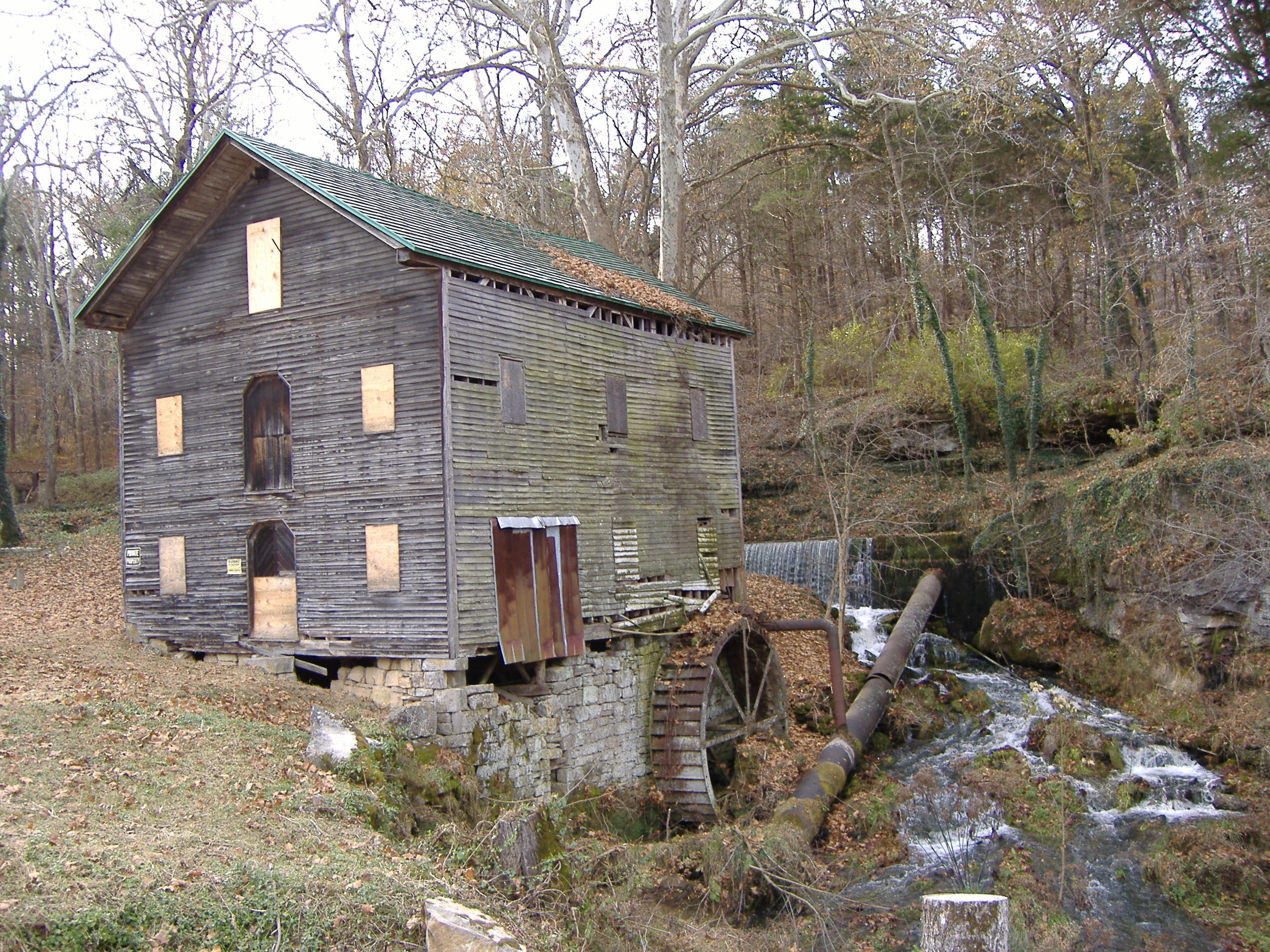
Beck's Mill before restoration

The site of the mill was originally an Indian burial ground, with the Shawnee and Delaware tribes living nearby. The Indians were presumably displeased when the first white man on the land, George Beck arrived from North Carolina with his sons to the Indiana Territory in 1807, after brief stops in Kentucky. Once establishing a place to live near the future site of his mill and building a primitive shelter, he retrieved the rest of his family, who were living near Louisville, Kentucky, a few months later.

While exploring his property, Beck saw a waterfall coming out of a cave while hunting on the property. He quickly decided it would be a perfect place for a mill. This waterfall, which is actually a spring, is the second-largest spring in Indiana. The cave is a mile-long, and provides water throughout the year. The first mill was built in 1808, and was 11 ft x 11 ft stone and log structure. Beck built a small dam uphill west of the mill, which through gravity would create a low head of pressure for water to go through wooden troughs to turn the mill wheel, which was overshot. Some of the stones used for mill were buhr, and were brought to the site from Louisville, but originally from France,. A second mill, built in 1825, was a frame building considerably larger than the first mill, which it replaced. Two carding machines were added in 1828.

The current mill was the third one on the property, and was the first to have two stories and furniture manufacturing. The mill in its most active years (1864–1890) ran 24 hours a day, using a turbine/waterwheel combination to turn the grindstones. Families would sometimes wait three days for their corn to be milled at Beck's, forcing a settlement by the mill. Eventually, the modern roller mills far surpassed the capability of gristmills, and urbanization made rural mills difficult to transport to in comparison, causing Beck's Mill to stop operating in 1914. In 1963 a tornado touched down on the property, killing two people.

Of the 65 mills that operated in Washington County, it is the only one still standing, and less than 20 still stand in Indiana. However, it was placed on Indiana's 10 Most Endangered List due to water damage and trespassers, some of whom vandalized the mill. Descendants of the original owners owned the mill and the surrounding area until November 2005, when the sixth generation became willing to sell.

== Restoration ==
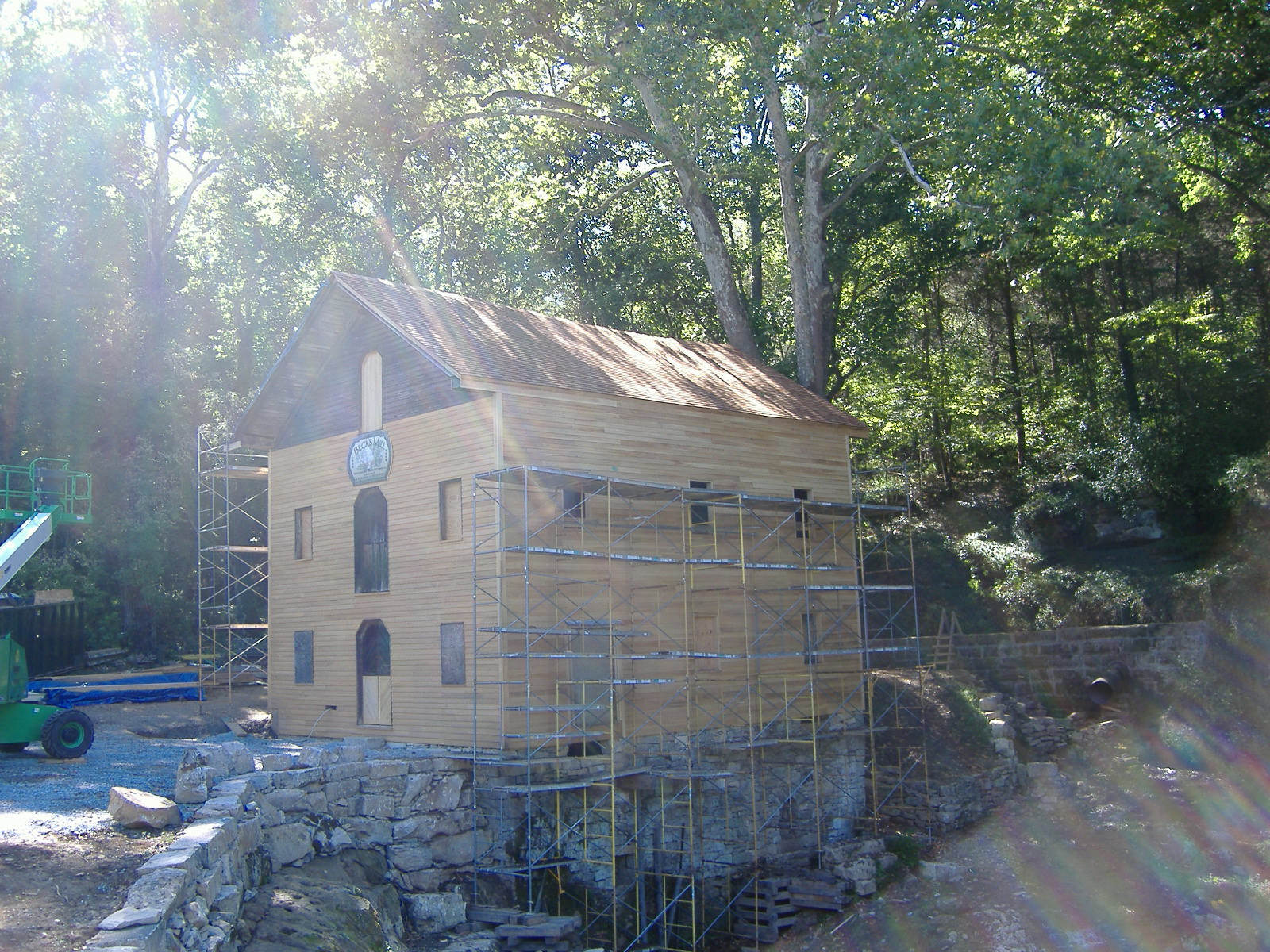
Beck's Mill near the end of its restoration

Friends of Beck's Mill, a nonprofit organization, was given the 14 acres (57,000 m^{2}) and building by Donald & Joyce Andersen (Joyce being a direct descendant of the George Beck family). This gift was the results of the efforts and negotiation of D. Jack Mahuron of Salem, with the hope that the mill could be saved, and maybe even become operational as the centerpiece of a local park. Mahuron had worked on getting the restoration started for several years, since the owner Estel Larue Allen died in 1982. In June 2006, a member of the Friends, won a $1,000 door prize from the Washington County Community Foundation, an annual giveaway for use of community projects, and chose to use the $1,000 to start an Endowment [Acorn Fund] for the mill. The fund created a permanent endowment to market and operate the mill.

John Hawkins, an architect from Jeffersonville, Indiana, calculated that $600,000 would be required to restore the mill, with additional funds needed to reopen it. Donald and Joyce Andersen has since offered the use of approximately over 70 acres (280,000 m^{2}) for use as trails and recreation. (This 70 plus acres has since been purchased from the Andersens in 2012 by Gayle Cook and presented to the Friends). 3 acres (12,000 m^{2}) across the road from the mill are used for parking at no cost to the Friends of Beck's Mill. William and Gayle Cook, billionaire philanthropists, made a large donation of approximately $1,200,000.00 in 2007 to begin the restoration process. Jack Mahuron had served on the Board of Advisers of IU Southeast with Bill Cook and knew that he and Gayle were interested in Beck's Mill. They had visited it several times over the years. Jack contacted him at Bloomington asking him to assist with the restoration. He graciously declined because he was busy with the restoration of French Lick and West Baden Hotels. A few months later, however, on March 1, 2007, he sent his Architect George Ridgway and his contractor Joe Pritchett of Pritchett Brothers, to a meeting of the Friends, it was announced that billionaire Bill and Gayle Cook would fund the restoration if the Friends would accept the offer.

Restoration of the mill began in earnest in May 2007 with Tracy Wells as foreman of the project for Pritchett Brothers. The first task was to remove the old equipment, tools, and the remaining features of the general store and fabric-making, including two carding machines. The old turbines were cleaned, and the stone foundation was repaired by lifting the mill from its moorings. In September 2007 the outside work was stopped for the year. The mill workings, currently held in storage at Salem, were re-installed in the spring 2008. A grand opening of the mill is planned for the fall of 2008, in time for the 200th anniversary of the first Beck's Mill.

The Washington County Chamber of Commerce gave their 2007 Citizen of the Year award to the Friends, due to the restoration of the mill. There is some fear that restoration of the mill by using cave water may affect the ecology of the cave, in particular its blind fish. Beck's Mill is set to be reopened for the public on September 20, 2008, to coincide with the Old Settler's Days festival in Salem.

Upon completion of the restoration, Jack Mahuron, the primary supporter and fund raiser for the restoration and a member of the Hoosier Hikers Council of Martinsville, Indiana, asked the hiking group to come in and build walking trails. Suzanne Mittenthal, executive Director of the group brought in several of the members for the work. Over a three-year period and on weekends the hikers built over three mile of trails for the public to use and enjoy Sinking Spring, the bluffs, the Quarry and the natural beauty of the park.

The restoration of a 200-year-old log cabin has also been in progress on the hill in back of the Mill. The cabin was completed by member Raymond Lee in the fall of 2011, with most of the funds for the cabin restoration coming from the Paul Ogle Foundation of Jeffersonville.

== Settlement ==
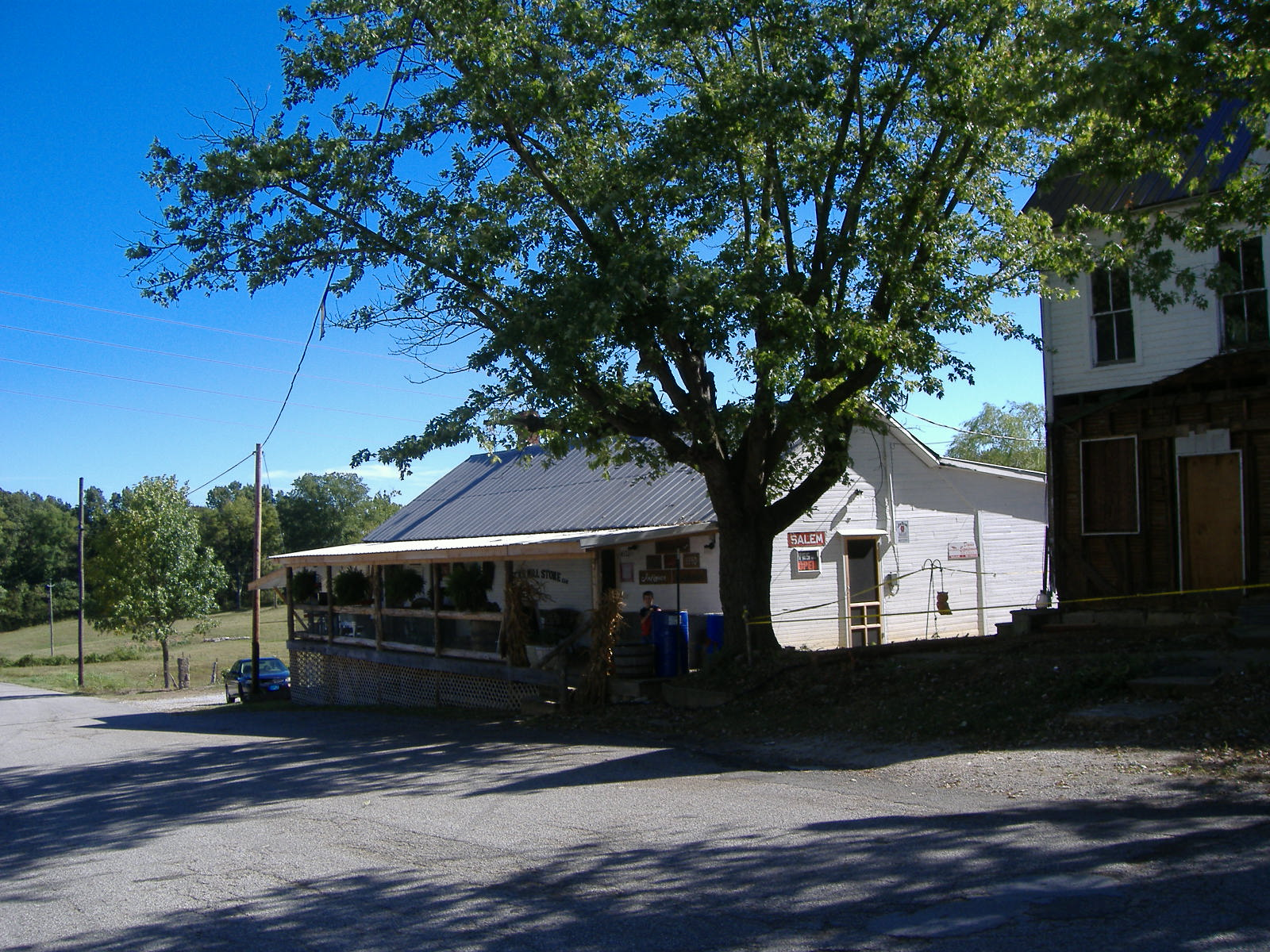
Country store at Beck's Mill, Indiana

After the Pigeon Roost Massacre in 1812, the Becks built two small forts on the property to protect against Indians, and perhaps also due to Indians stealing three barrels of whiskey from George Beck. The new protection began to draw new residents. In 1814 the settlement of Beck's Mill was in consideration to be the county seat of Washington County, only for Salem to eventually get the coveted position. Today the settlement, a few yards uphill from the mill, is the crossroad of Beck's Mill Road and Old Vincennes trail, with a former fire station and country store being its main signs of civilization. The Stage Coach stop from New Albany, Indiana was also located at the SW corner and is still standing. The Beck's Hill store has been reopened and is owned and operated by Bill and Annie Smith. It is operated as an old general store and museum. Food is also served, the menu consists of soups, sandwiches and soft ice cream. An extremely old dwelling on the SE adjoining the store and also belonging to Smith's is being restored.

== Beck's Mill Bridge ==
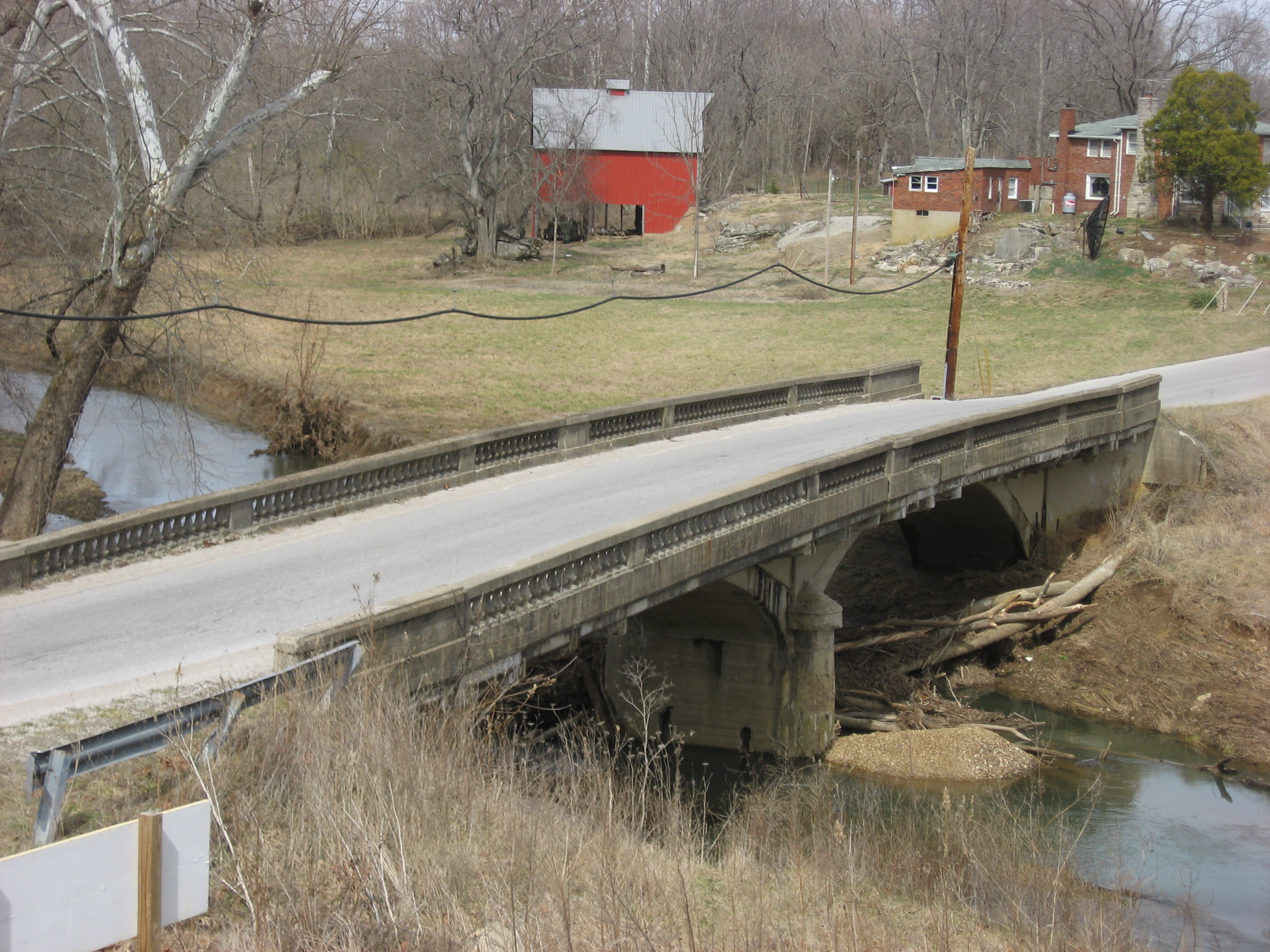
Beck's Mill Bridge

On September 20, 2007, the bridge by the mill, referred to by the NRHP as the Beck's Mill Bridge, or Washington County Bridge # 105, was placed on the National Register separately. It is a concrete arch bridge designed by Daniel Luten, a noted engineer from Indiana known for his work on elastic theory, for arch bridges. The bridge is scheduled to be restored in 2017.

== Gallery ==
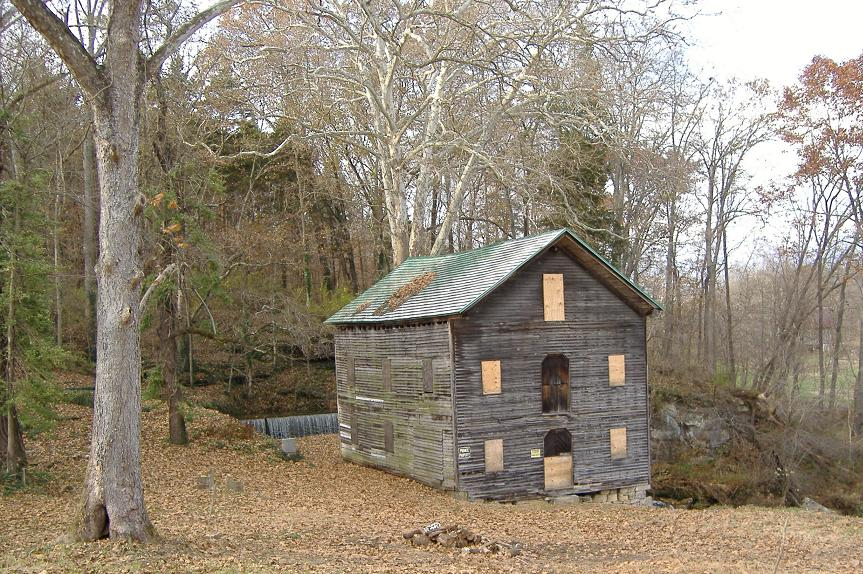
South side, November 2006

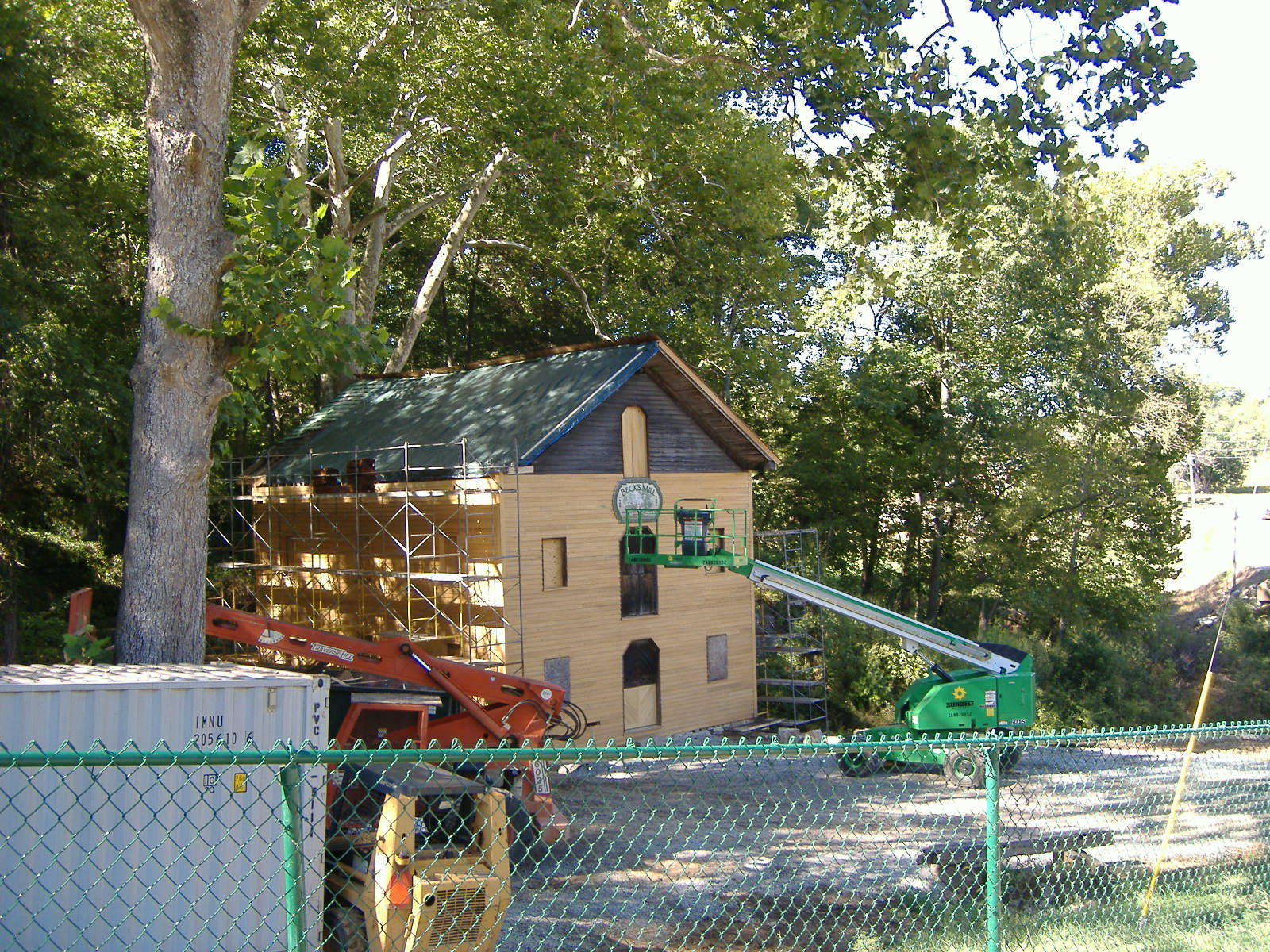
South side, September 2007

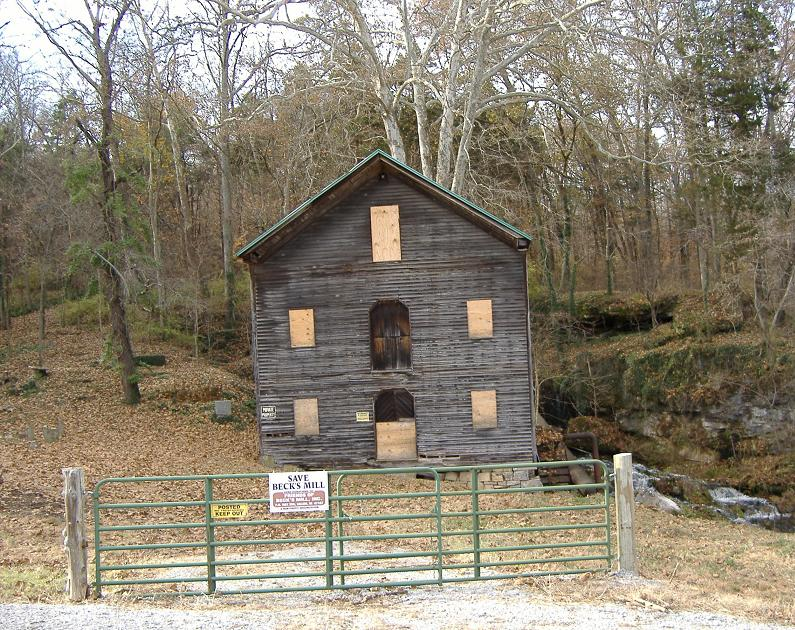
Road/East side, November 2006

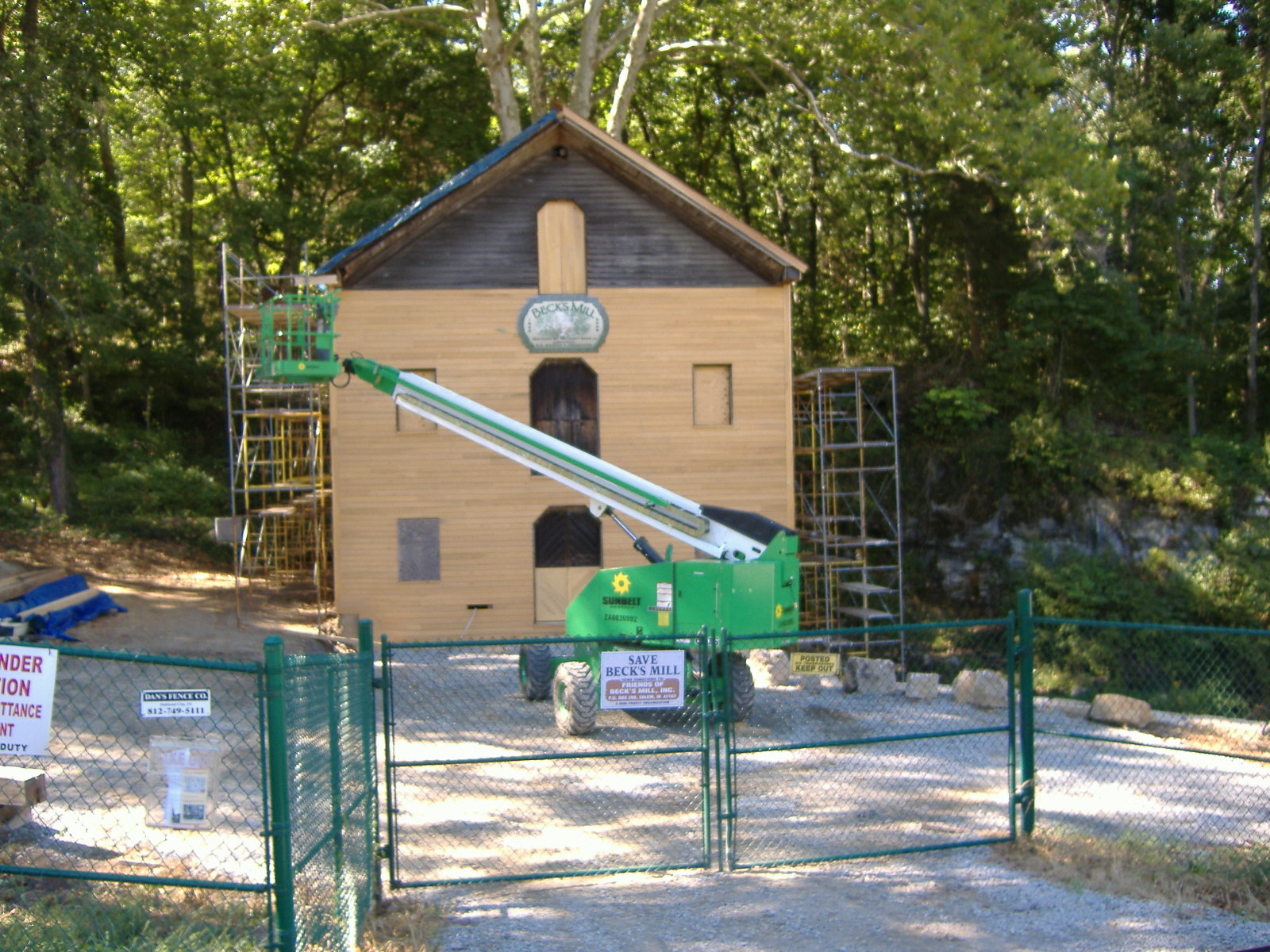
Road side, September 2007

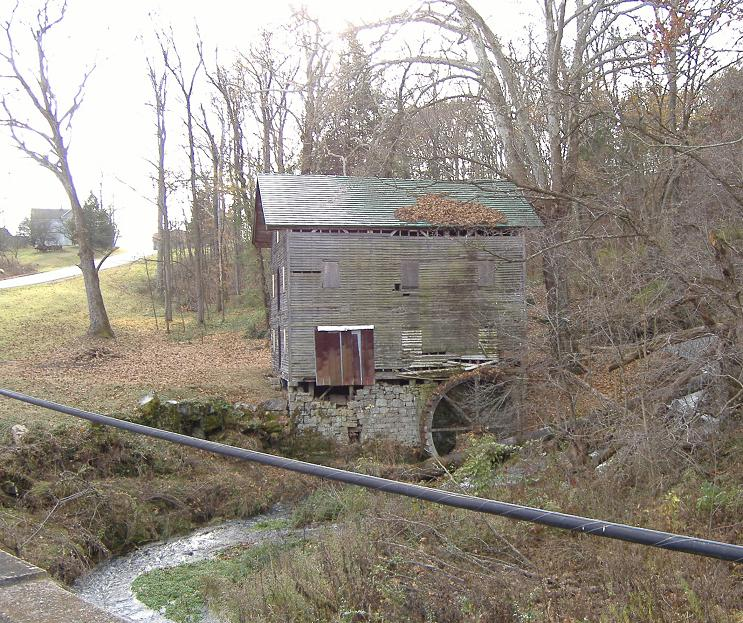
North side, November 2006

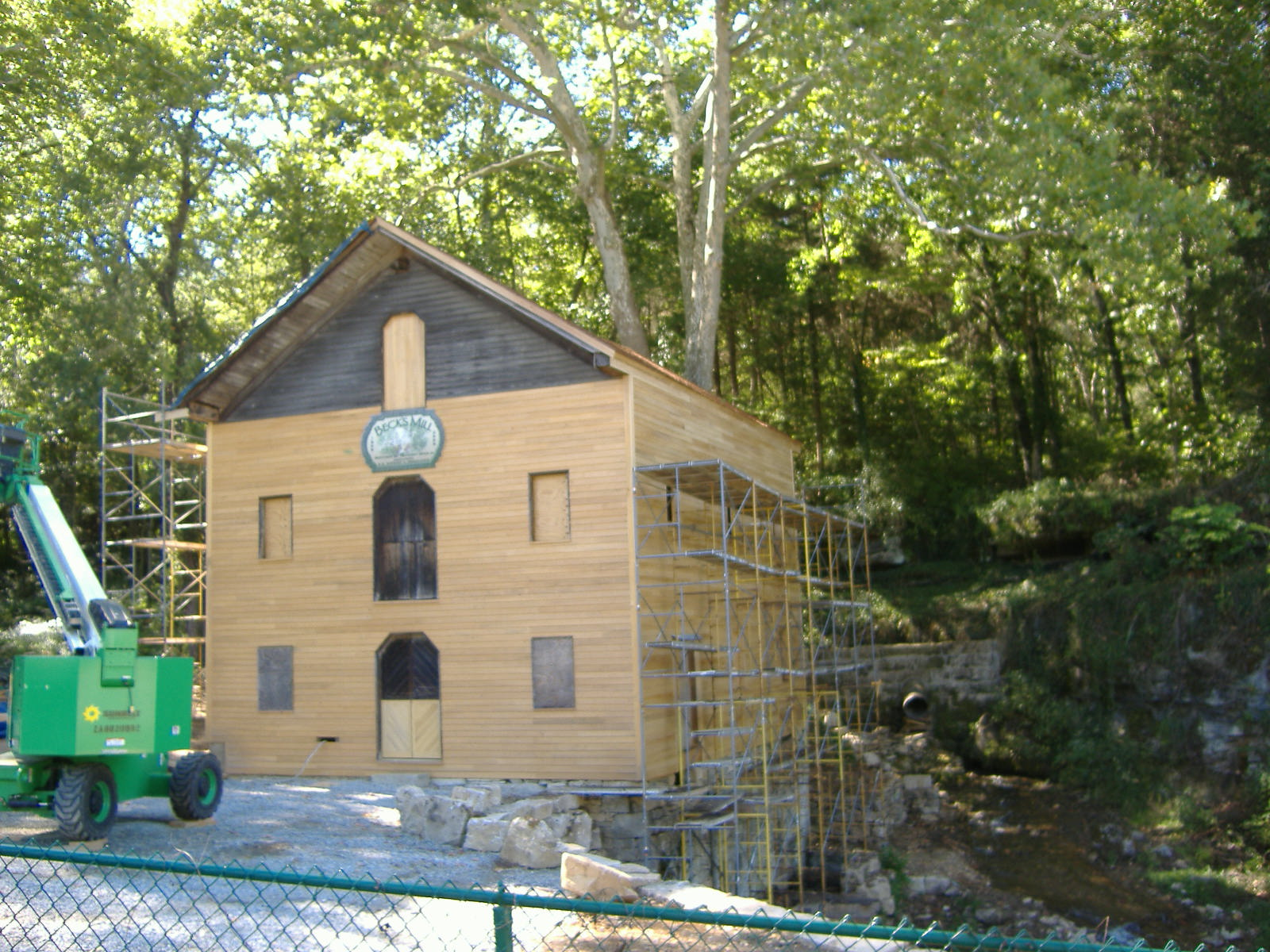
North side, September 2007

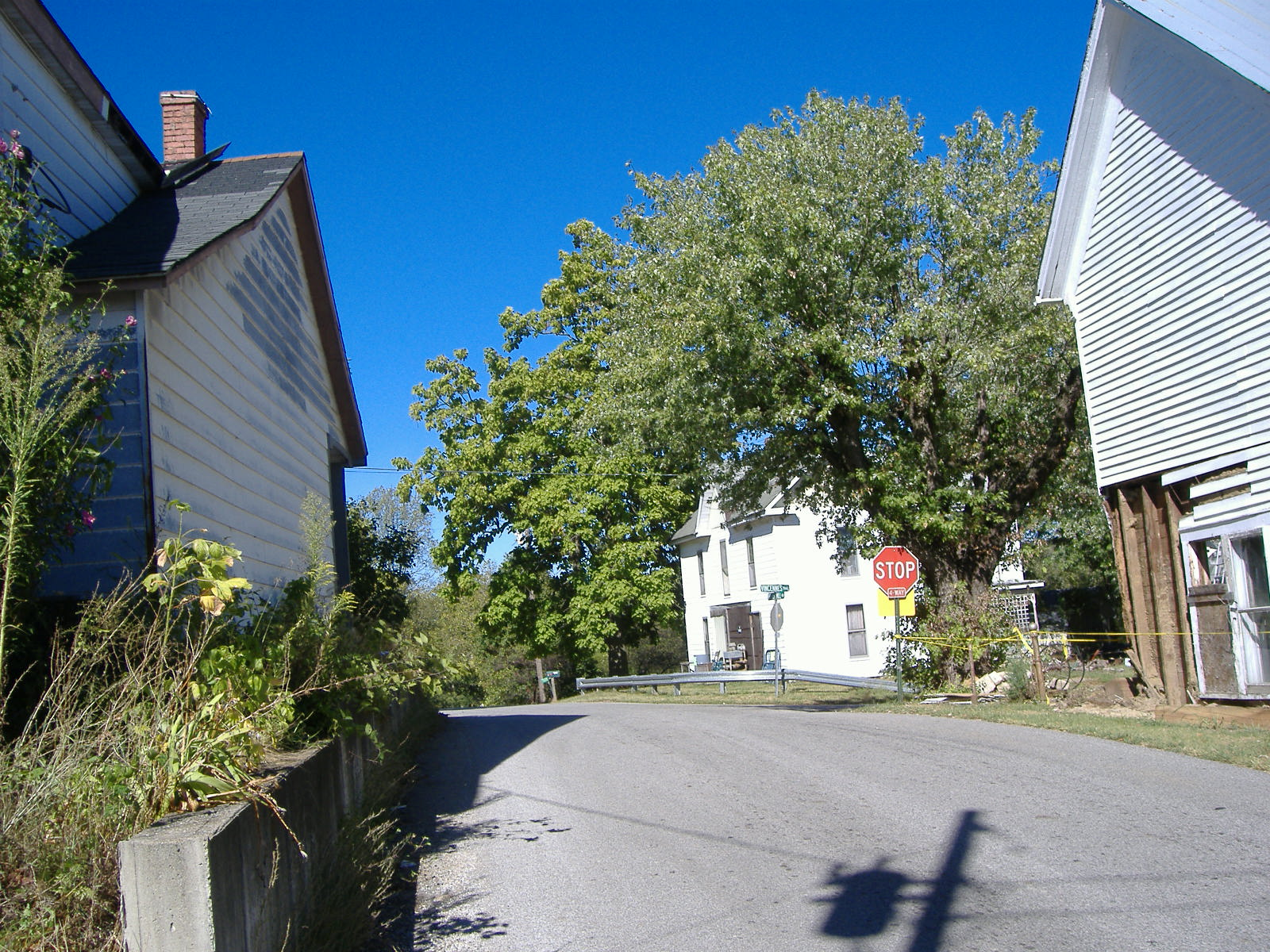
Crossroads of Beck's Mill, Indiana

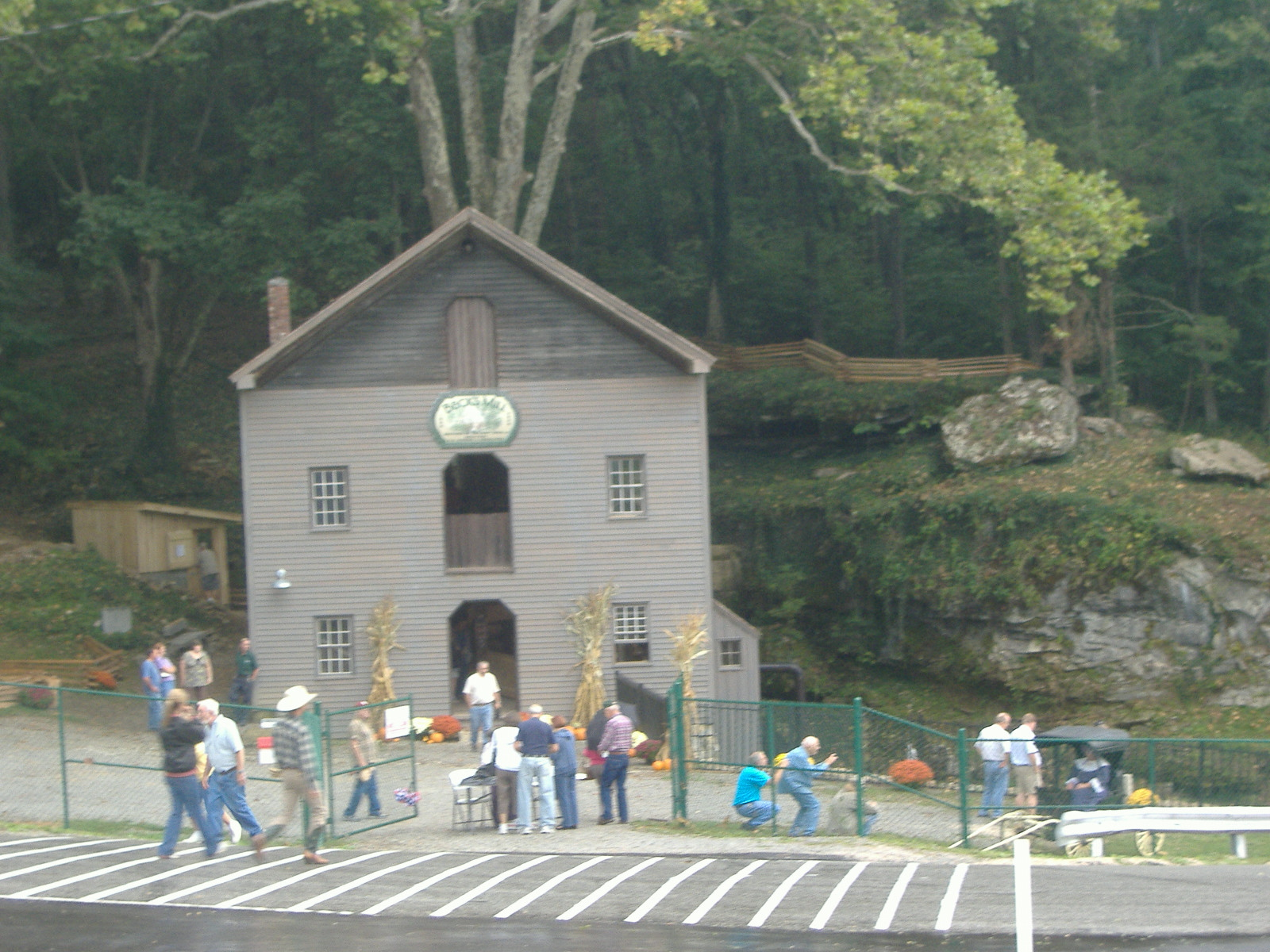
Road/East side, September 2008

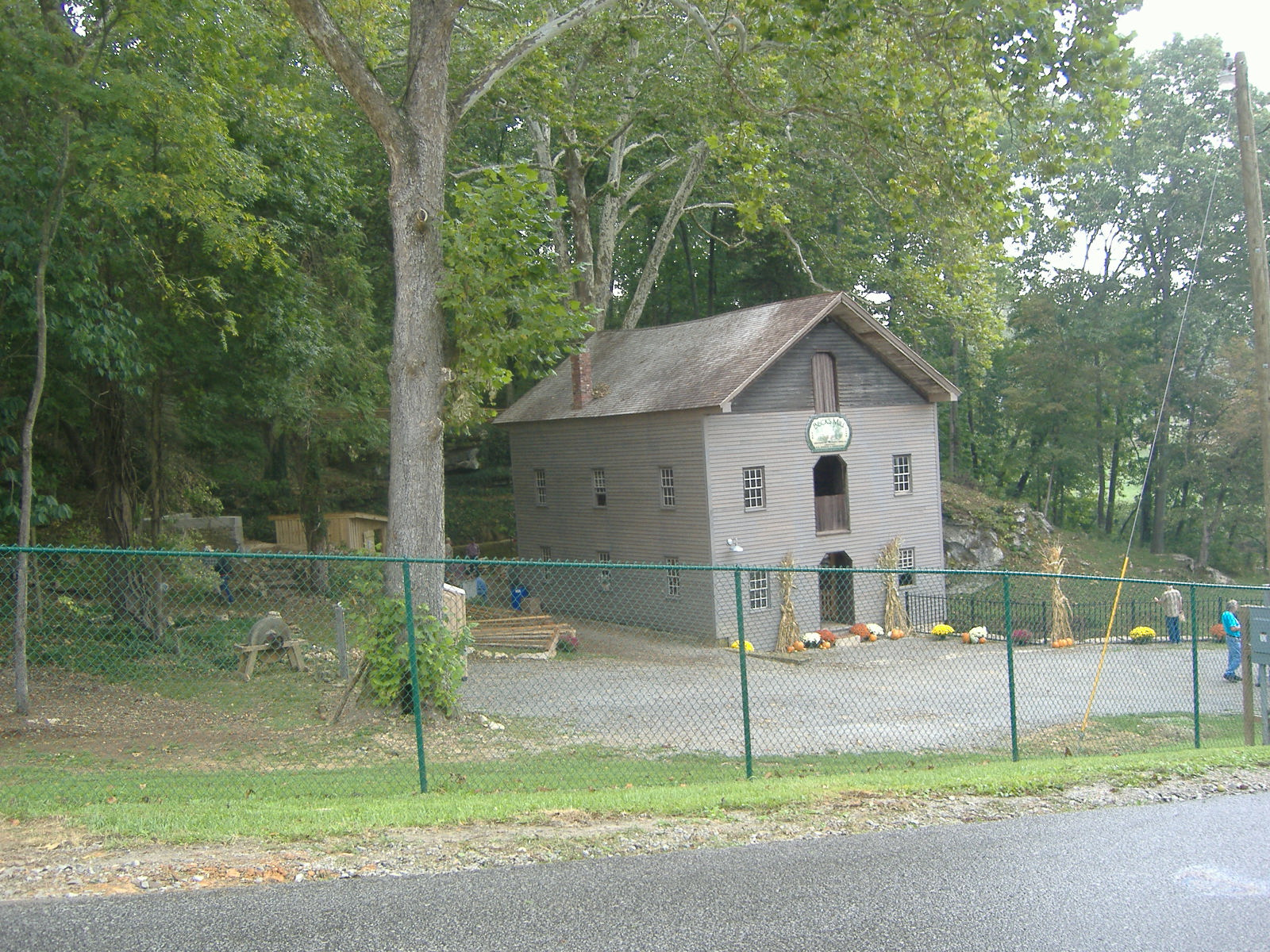
South side of the mill

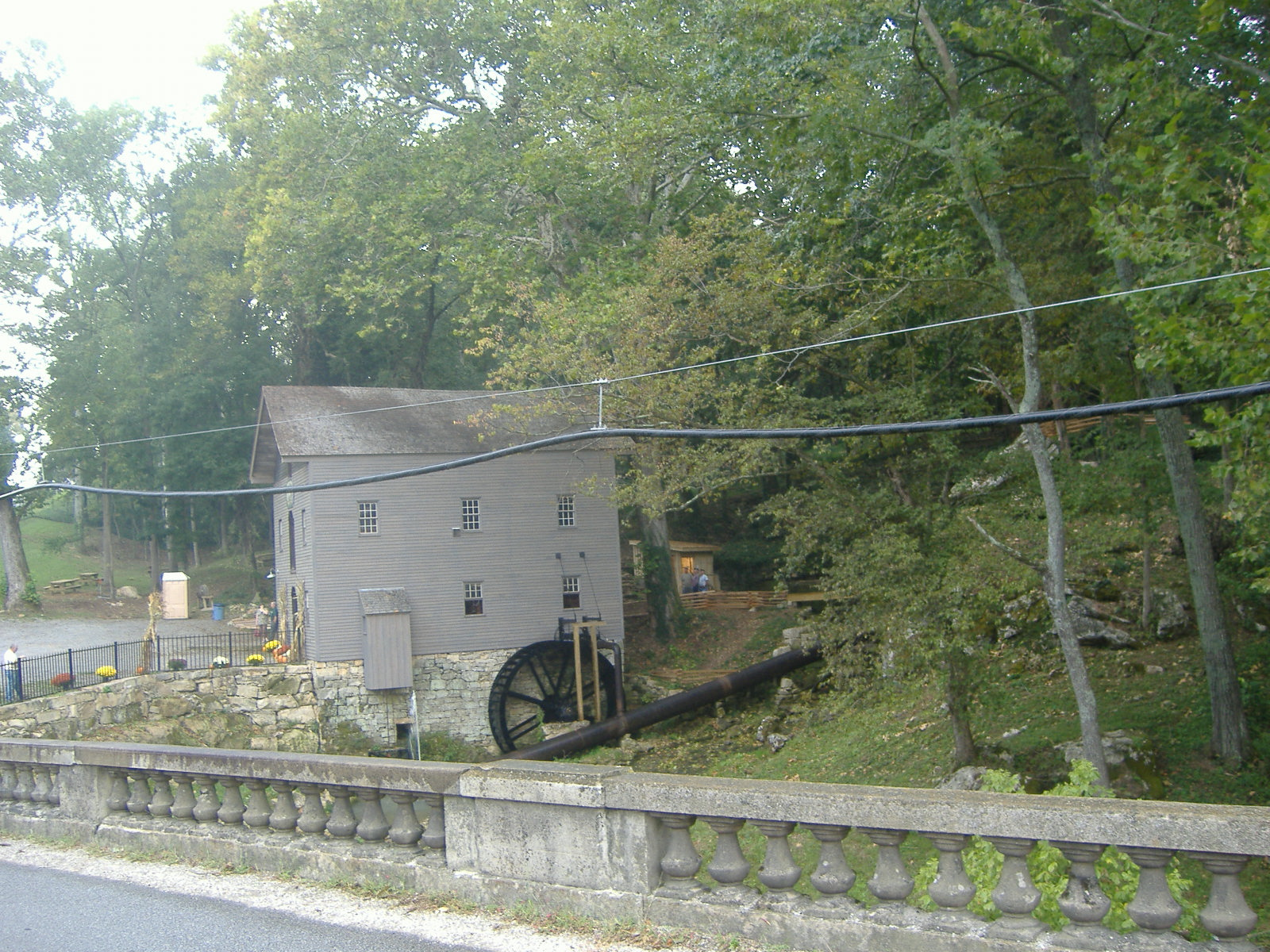
Distant view

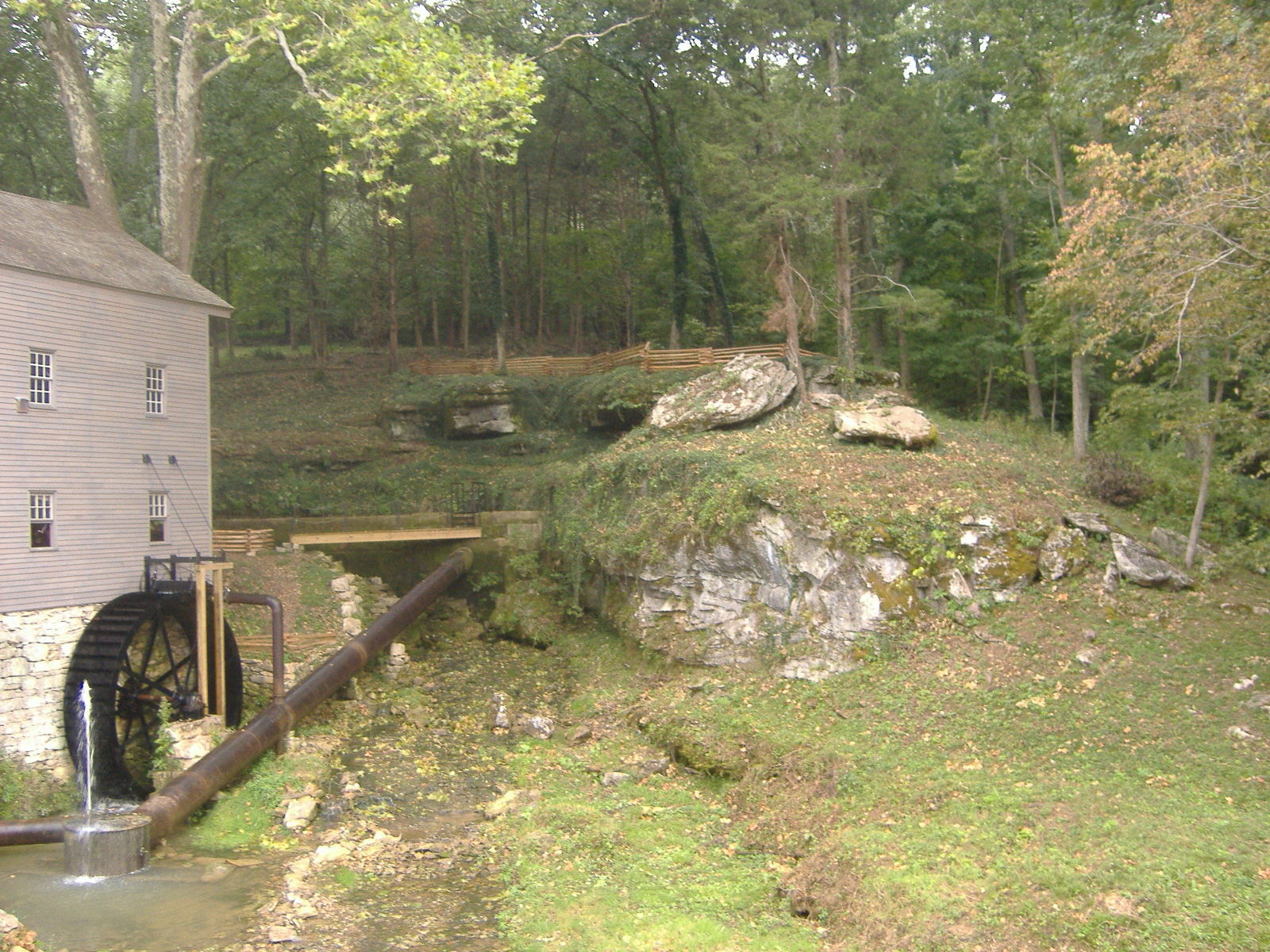
Hillside of the mill

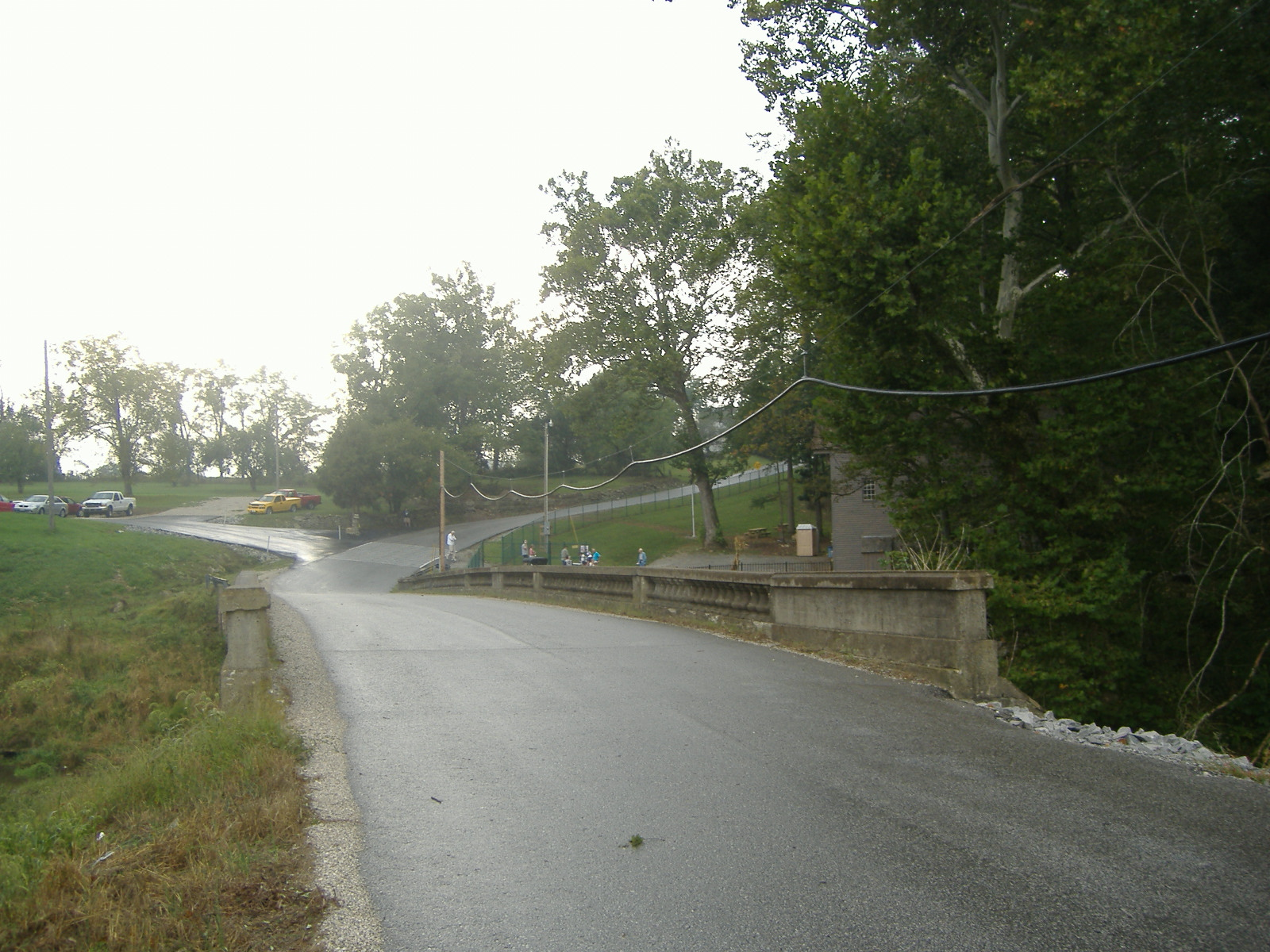
Another view of the bridge

== See also ==
- National Register of Historic Places listings in Washington County, Indiana
