= Becks Mill, Indiana =

- Unincorporated community
- Washington County's location in Indiana

- Location of Becks Mill in Washington County
- Coordinates: 38°32′07″N 86°09′20″W
- Country: United States
- State: Indiana
- County: Washington
- Township: Howard
- Elevation: 735 ft (224 m)
- Time zone: UTC-5 (Eastern (EST))
  - Summer (DST): UTC-4 (EDT)
- ZIP code: 47167
- Area codes: 812, 930
- GNIS feature ID: 449618

Becks Mill is an unincorporated community in Howard Township, Washington County, in the U.S. state of Indiana.

== History ==
Beck's Mill, the first gristmill in the county, was built by George Beck in 1808.

A post office was established at Becks Mill in 1858, and remained in operation until it was discontinued in 1900.

== Geography ==
Becks Mill is located at 38°32′07″N 86°09′20″W.
