= John Hay Center =

Historic house in Indiana, United States

- Hay-Morrison House
- U.S. National Register of Historic Places
- U.S. Historic district – Contributing property
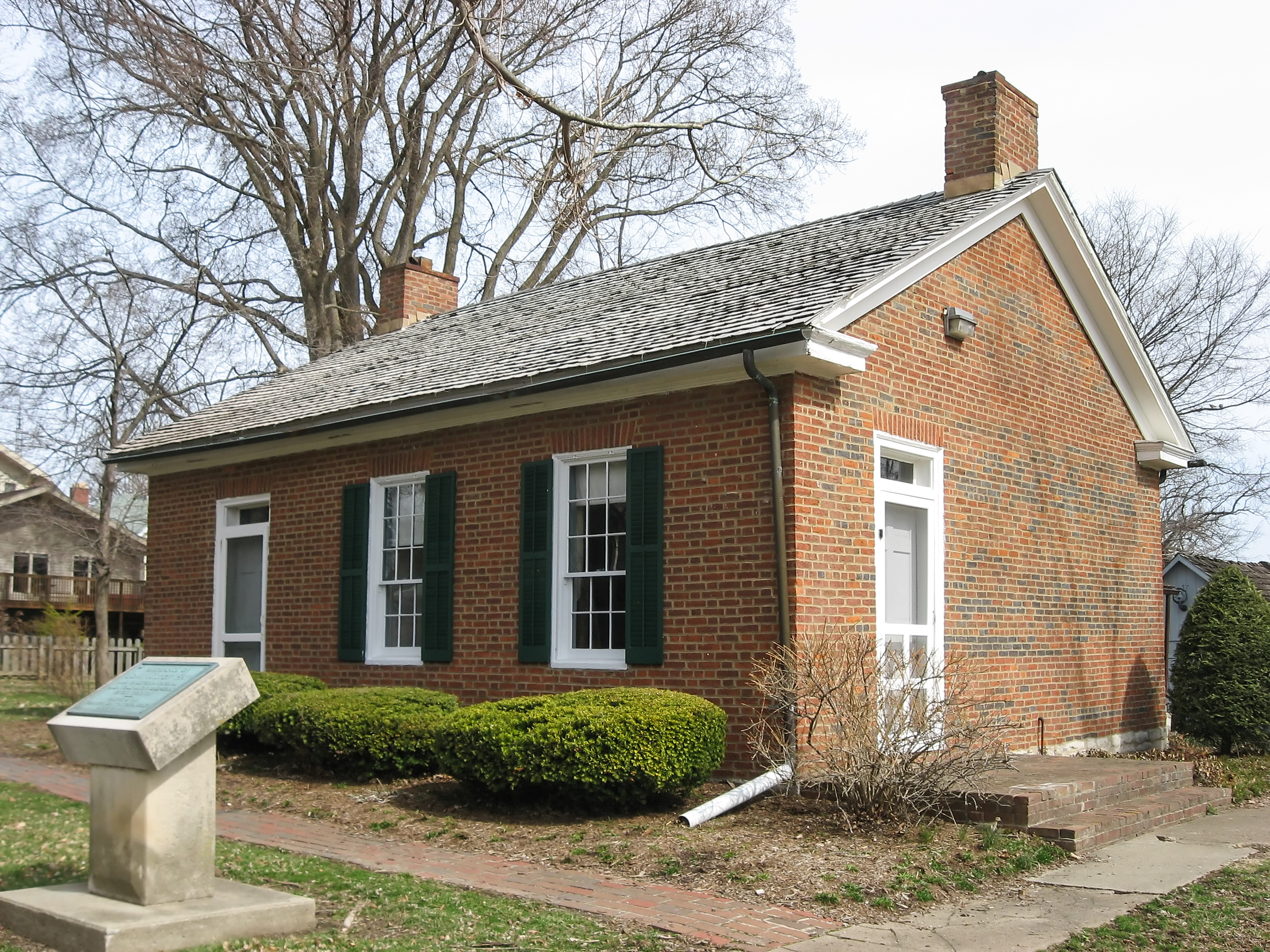
- Front and southern end of the house

- Location within Washington County, Indiana Location within Indiana Location within the United States
- Location: Salem, Indiana
- Coordinates: 38°36′18.98″N 86°5′50.01″W
- Built: 1824
- Architectural style: Federal
- NRHP reference No.: 71000007
- Added to NRHP: October 26, 1971

The John Hay Center is on the eastern edge of the Salem Downtown Historic District in Salem, Indiana. It comprises:

- Hay-Morrison House: birthplace and home of Abraham Lincoln's private secretary and Secretary of State under William McKinley and Theodore Roosevelt, John Hay, and is on the National Register of Historic Places since 1971. It was purchased in 1837 by Hay's father, Dr. Charles Hay. The Washington County Historical Society purchased the home in 1967, and restored it to an 1840 appearance.
- Pioneer Village: a "living village" typical of the 1840s in Indiana. The general store and post office were from New Philadelphia, Indiana, and the bell tower, blacksmith, cabin, carpenter, church, jail, loom, school, and smokehouse buildings were constructed of logs from old Washington County stores and homes.
- Stevens Memorial Museum: It was built in 1970 from materials of several local historic buildings, particularly brick. It holds several artifacts of Indiana and American importance, and a genealogy center. Exhibits include a dentist office, a local candy maker, and antebellum attorneys. Additions were added in 1984 and 1995.
- Depot Railroad Museum: Built to resemble the depot burned by John Hunt Morgan in 1863, and holds various railroad memorabilia and panoramas of the Washington County, Indiana, landscape in historical times. This includes a money chest that was checked by Morgan's Raiders for money, and when it revealed only tools, the depot was burned. It was dedicated on September 22, 2001, thanks to the efforts of local retired newspaper editor Cecil Smith; whose collection was the basis of the depot, with several grants from contributors and 39 students moved the model trains to the newly built building.

No money was ever borrowed to make improvements on the center; everything was paid with funds already in hand. The center was the brainchild of native Everett Dean, who had a fondness for local history. Much of his memorabilia are within the museum.

== Gallery ==
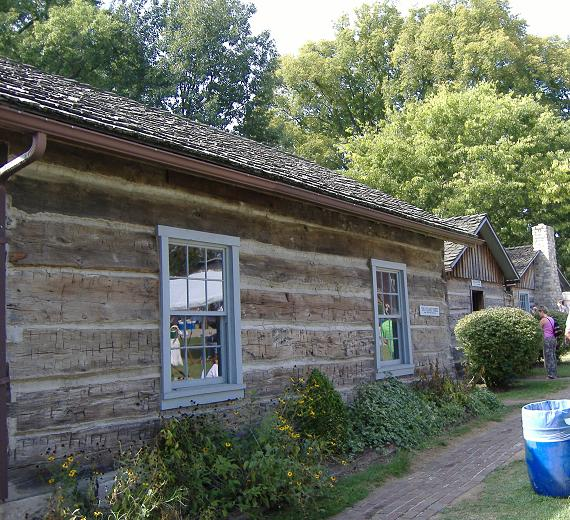
Cabins in the Pioneer Village

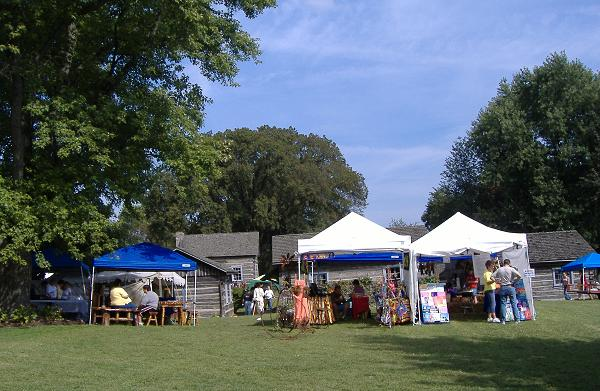
Old Settlers' Days' festival within the Center

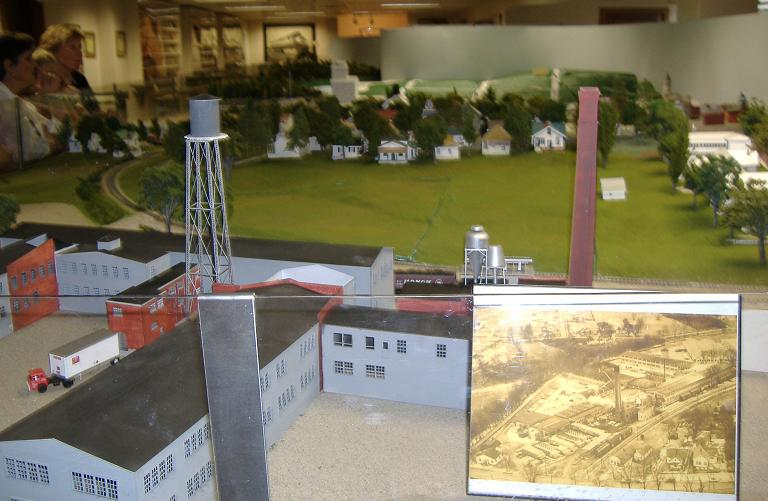
Panorama inside the Depot

== See also ==
- List of attractions and events in the Louisville metropolitan area
- National Register of Historic Places listings in Washington County, Indiana
