= Flora Harrod Hawes =

American postmaster

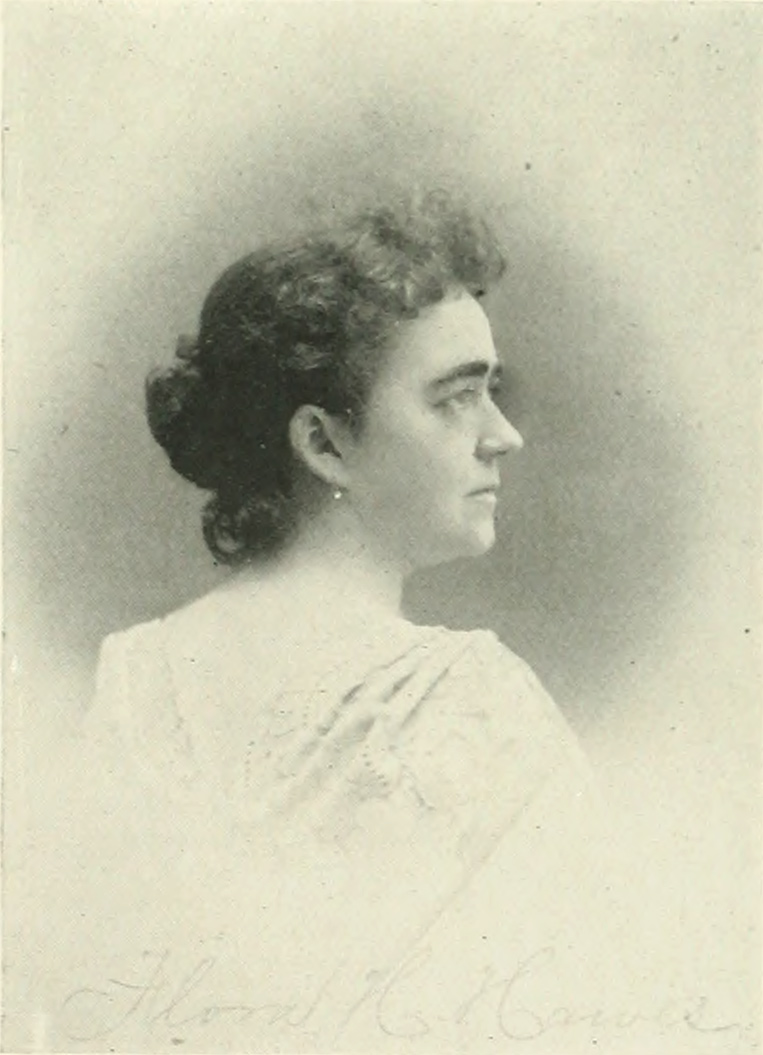
- "A Woman of the Century"
- Born: Flora New Harrod; 1863; Salem, Indiana
- Died: December 20, 1929 (aged 65–66); Los Angeles, California

Flora Harrod Hawes (née Flora New Harrod; after second marriage, Flora Harrod Wilson; 1863 – December 20, 1929) was an American postmaster. At one time, she was the youngest woman in the United States holding this position.

== Early life and education ==
Flora New Harrod was born in Salem, Indiana, in 1863, where she was educated. She was a daughter of Dr. Sandford Hickman Harrod (1827–1888), a physician of southern Indiana, and Margaret Rosalie (Thompson) Harrod. Her siblings included Jerome Patterson Harrod, Idumea Land Harrod, Sardinia Island Harrod, Lincoln Seward Harrod, Itasca Lake Harrod, and Warder N. Harrod. After her mother's death in 1883, the father married Martha R. Bently. Her father's remote ancestors were of Roman origin before coming to the US. His parents were among the early pioneers of Kentucky, and Harrodsburg in that State was named for the family, who, in 1820, moved to Indiana.

== Career ==
Harrod, at an early age, married Professor Edgar P. Hawes, of Louisville, Kentucky. After a brief married life, her husband died. She turned to teaching to support herself, and became a successful instructor in elocution, an art in which she excelled and had earned honors for when she was a student. In 1886–87, she was teaching at the Collegiate Institute, of Crab Orchard, Kentucky.

She applied to President Benjamin Harrison for the post office in Hot Springs, Arkansas, going in person to urge her own appointment. She received the commission August 16, 1889, took charge of the office September 15, 1889, and was confirmed by the United States Senate December 19, 1889. Hawes received a salary of US$2,600 a year and managed 13 employees, four of whom were women. At that time, she was the youngest woman in the US holding this position, and her office was the second largest in the US controlled by a woman. She later married Erasmus Wilson at New Albany, Indiana. Hawes died at her home in Los Angeles on December 20, 1929, and was buried at Forest Lawn Memorial Park.

== Bibliography ==
- Cutter, William Richard (1929). American Biography: A New Cyclopedia. American Historical Society.
