= Organ Springs, Indiana =

- Unincorporated community
- Washington County's location in Indiana

- Location of Organ Springs in Washington County
- Coordinates: 38°28′38″N 86°09′52″W
- Country: United States
- State: Indiana
- County: Washington
- Township: Howard
- Elevation: 636 ft (194 m)
- Time zone: UTC-5 (Eastern (EST))
  - Summer (DST): UTC-4 (EDT)
- ZIP code: 47167
- Area codes: 812, 930
- GNIS feature ID: 440697

Organ Springs is an unincorporated community in Howard Township, Washington County, in the U.S. state of Indiana.

== History ==
Its namesake Organ Spring was so named from the "music" made by the dripping water of a cave.

A post office was established at Organ Springs in 1858, and remained in operation until it was discontinued in 1901.

== Geography ==
Organ Springs is located at 38°28′38″N 86°09′52″W.
