= Washington County Jail =

Washington County Jail or variations may refer to:

in the United States

(by state)

- Washington County Jail (Fayetteville, Arkansas), listed on the NRHP in Arkansas
- Washington County Jail and Sheriff's Residence (Washington, Kansas), listed on the NRHP in Kansas
- Washington County Jail and Sheriff's Residence (Salem, Indiana), listed on the NRHP in Indiana
- Washington County Jail (Maine), Machias, listed on the NRHP in Maine
- Washington County Jail (Oregon), formerly listed on the NRHP in Oregon, was located in Hillsboro, has been moved, is now in a museum
- Washington County Jail (Washington, Pennsylvania), listed on the NRHP in Pennsylvania
- Washington County Jail, Utah (properly, the Purgatory Correctional Facility)
