= Southern Indiana Transit System =

Provider of mass transportation in Southern Indiana

- Locale: Corydon and Salem, Indiana
- Service area: Crawford, Floyd, Harrison, Scott and Washington counties, Indiana
- Service type: Bus service, paratransit
- Routes: 2
- Fleet: 4 buses
- Annual ridership: 28,262 (2019)
- Website: Southern Indiana Transit System

Southern Indiana Transit System (SITS) is a provider of mass transportation in Southern Indiana with two deviated fixed route services in Corydon and Salem. As of 2019, the system provided 28,262 rides over 11,665 annual vehicle revenue hours with 4 buses and 12 paratransit vehicles.

== History ==
SITS expanded demand-response service to Floyd County in late 2022. In 2023, Floyd County completed a transit plan, which looked into improving SITS service in several ways. Possible improvements include a mobile app, a shorter booking window, and shared rides.

== Service ==
SITS operates two weekday bus routes in Corydon and Salem in addition to demand-response service throughout the five county area. Hours of operation for the system are Monday through Friday from 6:00 A.M. to 6:00 P.M. The deviated fixed route buses operate from 8:30 A.M. to 12:35 P.M. There is no service on Saturdays and Sundays.

=== Routes ===
- Corydon deviated fixed-route
- Salem deviated fixed route

== Fixed route ridership ==
The ridership statistics shown here are of fixed route services only and do not include demand response services.

== See also ==
- List of bus transit systems in the United States
- Washington Transit System
