= First Baptist Church (Salem, Indiana) =

Historic church in Indiana, United States

- U.S. National Register of Historic Places
- U.S. Historic district – Contributing property
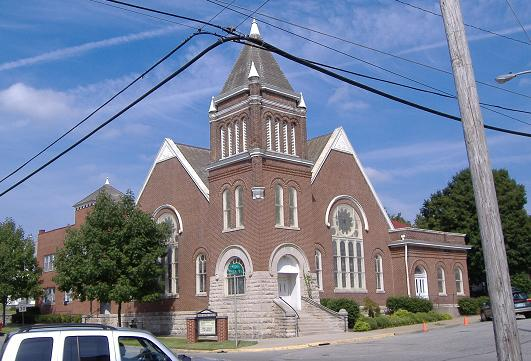

- Location within Washington County, Indiana Location within Indiana Location within the United States
- Location: 201 N. High St., Salem, Indiana
- Coordinates: 38°36′25″N 86°5′58″W
- Built: 1900
- Architect: Stephans, R.C.
- Architectural style: Romanesque, Richardsonian Romanesque
- NRHP reference No.: 85000602
- Added to NRHP: March 21, 1985

First Baptist Church is a historic Baptist church located at Salem, Indiana. It was built in 1900, and is a Richardsonian Romanesque style brick and stone church. It has a central gabled nave and a three-story corner tower with a pyramidal roof.

It was listed on the National Register of Historic Places in 1985. It is also a contributing property in the Salem Downtown Historic District which was NRHP-listed in 1997.
