= Howard Township, Washington County, Indiana =

Howard Township
- Township
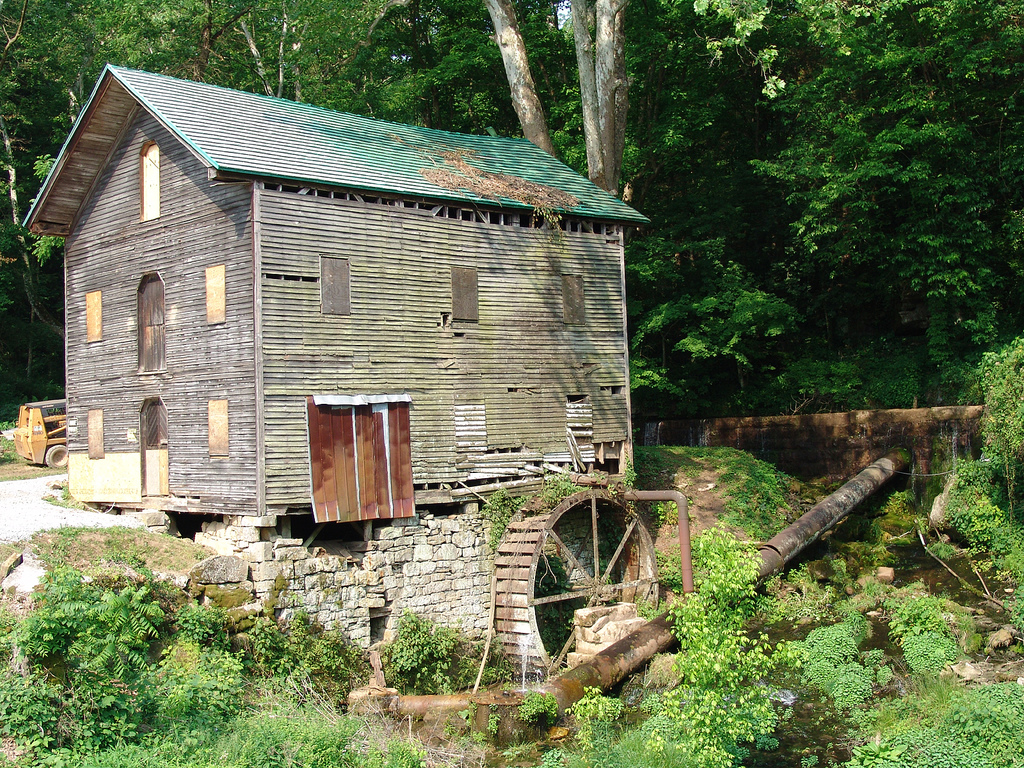
- Beck's Mill, a historic site in the township

- Location in Washington County
- Coordinates: 38°31′12″N 86°10′13″W
- Country: United States
- State: Indiana
- County: Washington

Government
  - Type: Indiana township

Area
  - Total: 36.13 sq mi (93.6 km^{2})
  - Land: 35.82 sq mi (92.8 km^{2})
  - Water: 0.3 sq mi (0.78 km^{2}) 0.83%
- Elevation: 764 ft (233 m)

Population (2020)
  - Total: 1,272
  - Density: 35.51/sq mi (13.71/km^{2})
- ZIP codes: 47108, 47120, 47125, 47165, 47167
- GNIS feature ID: 0453421

Howard Township is one of thirteen townships in Washington County, Indiana, United States. As of the 2020 census, its population was 1,272 and it contained 485 housing units. It was named for Gen. Tilghman Howard.

Historical population
Census	Pop.	Note	%±
1890	1,168		—
1900	1,180		1.0%
1910	962		−18.5%
1920	867		−9.9%
1930	832		−4.0%
1940	815		−2.0%
1950	855		4.9%
1960	707		−17.3%
1970	834		18.0%
1980	1,079		29.4%
1990	1,084		0.5%
2000	1,375		26.8%
2010	1,262		−8.2%
2020	1,272		0.8%
Source: US Decennial Census

== Geography ==
According to the 2010 census, the township has a total area of 36.13 square miles (93.6 km^{2}), of which 35.82 square miles (92.8 km^{2}) (or 99.14%) is land and 0.3 square miles (0.78 km^{2}) (or 0.83%) is water.

=== Unincorporated towns ===
- Becks Mill at 38.535336°N 86.155534°W
- Organ Springs at 38.476726°N 86.164700°W

(This list is based on USGS data and may include former settlements.)

=== Adjacent townships ===
- Washington Township (northeast)
- Pierce Township (east)
- Jackson Township (southeast)
- Posey Township (southwest)
- Madison Township (west)
- Vernon Township (northwest)

=== Cemeteries ===
The township contains these five cemeteries: Becks, Hall, Kansas Church, Smith-Miller Pioneer and Voyles.

== School districts ==
- West Washington School Corporation

== Political districts ==
- Indiana's 9th congressional district
- State House District 73
- State Senate District 44
