= Rafael Blanco (artist) =

American artist (born 1981)

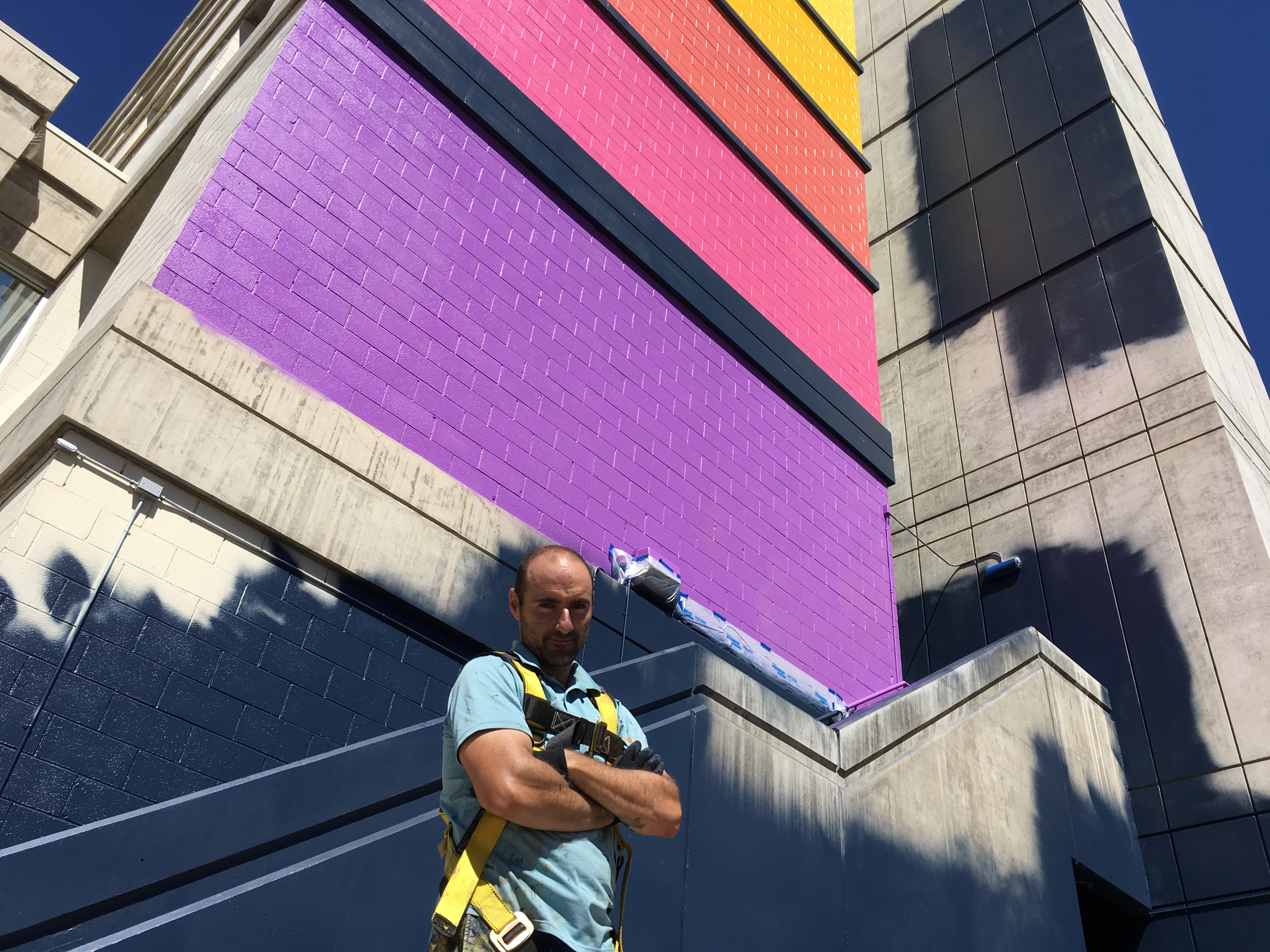
- Blanco in 2020
- Born: August 13, 1981 (age 45); Alicante, Spain
- Citizenship: United States
- Occupation: Mural Artist
- Known for: Diversity murals
- Website: www.rafael-blanco.com

Rafael Lopez de San Roman Blanco is a professional muralist based in the United States. He has been a studio artist since 2004 and has an extensive exhibition record both nationally and internationally. More recently, Blanco has been transforming his studio background to create large-scale public mural paintings in the United States. His medium of choice is a combination of exterior latex house paint and water- mixable oils, and once completed, his murals are sealed with a UV and water sealer/protector to ensure their vibrant life for 20–30 years. He blends classic studio painting techniques like glazing with large-scale mural techniques. He also uses computer visual techniques like transparency layers in his mural work and plays with classical and contemporary styles. Blanco is also an Assistant Professor of Art at Elmhurst University, and he resides in Aurora, Illinois, with his family.

== Early life ==
Rafael Blanco was born in Alicante, Spain on August 13, 1981, and grew up in Madrid as the youngest of six children. His art is often influenced by his grandfather – a known sculptor in Spain. Blanco often recounts his childhood visiting the National Prado Museum and his fascination with paintings by Velazquez, Goya, Zurbaran, Dali and Picasso, and the remarkable realism in their canvases.

In 2000 at the age of 19, Blanco moved to the United States to attend Florida Southern College in Lakeland, Florida, on a full-ride tennis scholarship. He then transferred to Saint Mary's College of California in Moraga, California, in 2002 and continued to compete as a college athlete in tennis, where he graduated in 2004 with a B.A. in studio art.

In 2009, Blanco got a job as the Assistant Tennis Coach at the University of Nevada, Reno. Soon, immediately after moving to Nevada, Blanco was admitted into the MFA in Art program with an emphasis in drawing and painting. During his third year of the program as a master of fine arts student, Blanco quit his coaching job to pursue his academic career full-time until he graduated from the University of Nevada, Reno with his MFA in Art in 2013.

Blanco earned his first full-time teaching job in 2014 as the Art Program Coordinator at Feather River College in Quincy, California. It was at this time, Blanco entered the public art scene.

== Murals ==
Blanco continues to have studio artwork on display at exhibits (under the artist names of Blanco de San Roman and Rafael Lopez), but it was in 2014 when Blanco participated in his first mural contest (under the artist name Rafael Blanco) where he found his true passion.

=== 24-hour Reno Mural Marathon ===
Blanco's 15-foot by 20-foot mural “The Jump” featuring his children, took the second-place prize in the inaugural 24-hour Reno Mural Marathon in Reno, Nevada, in 2014. Blanco competed in the 24-hour Reno Mural Marathon again in 2016 and took the second-place prize once more with “Dancing Street.” This 15-foot by 20-foot mural featured two hip-hop street dancers performing in the street. Again, Blanco competed in the fourth annual 24-hour Reno Mural Marathon and took the second-place prize in July 2017 with “Snapshot.” The 15-foot by 20-foot mural featured a person behind a camera lens snapping a photo of its subject looking back at it. Later that fall, in October 2017, Blanco painted “Irma” at the Reno Mural Expo, which was a 20-foot by 20-foot piece and featured the face of an Indigenous woman with a transparent American Flag on her face. In 2019, Blanco made another debut in the 24-hour Reno Mural Marathon when he took the third-place prize with “Frida Kahlo.”

=== Train Murals ===
In 2017, Blanco started the summer with “Railroading Away” in Live Oak, California. This 17-foot by 50-foot mural featured a conductor peering out of a steam engine locomotive preparing to travel. In 2018, trains again are getting displayed in Blanco's “Western Pacific” mural. Modern locomotives span the 17-foot by 12-foot Western Pacific Railroad Museum building in Portola, California – one of the change sites on the Western Pacific Railroad over the Sierra Mountains.

=== Diversity Murals ===
Blanco's murals tend to focus on critical subjects such as illegal immigration and American patriotism; his thorough research of his subjects give his murals real meaning and bring out cultural heritage.

In June 2018, Blanco started the year painting the “La Michoacana mural,” which featured Latina women dancing in cultural attire and a Hispanic man atop a horse while another Hispanic cowboy plays guitar. This was a 17-foot by 66-foot mural in Lincoln, California, that displayed the town's Hispanic Heritage.

The following summer, Blanco painted the “Dorothea Lange” 80-foot by 16-foot mural on the side of a photography business building in Roseville, California. Blanco's research on this forgotten, famous, female depression-era photographer prevailed in his artwork of Lange taking a photo with her 1930s folding camera. This mural also displays a quote by Lange which said, “The camera is an instrument that teaches people how to see without a camera.”

In winter 2019, Blanco painted the “Color Isn’t Race” mural in Denver, Colorado. The seven-foot by 30-foot mural once again showcases Blanco's use of colorful, vertical strips as a backdrop (mainly used as a mapping technique to paint in large scale) and close-up images of four diverse sets of faces. These faces, which showcase different ethnicities, age, gender and race, bring out Blanco's cultural theme in his more recent works.

Identity and human expression are relentlessly present in his pieces, as is the case with the “Sierra Hall” mural on the University of Nevada, Reno campus. In July 2020, Blanco painted a seven-story mural on the Sierra Hall building facing Virginia Street. On the left side of the mural, six sets of human eyes are painted horizontally in a swath of rainbow stripes, representing different races, ages, ethnicities and sexual orientation. The eyes of Colin Kaepernick are represented at the top. On the center column, Blanco painted his own version of a clenched fist that is a symbol of resistance and defiance against social and racial injustices. To the right of this, continues the colorful horizontal stripes with a quote by Audre Lorde that reads, “It is not difference which immobilizes us, but silence.”

In the fall of 2020 in Frederick, Maryland, Blanco painted a mural of famous jazz artist Lester Bowie. Bowie was from Frederick County which brought historical culture to the public mural. Bowie plays the trumpet on the side of the 22-foot by 18-foot building downtown in his then 1960s-typical-surgical mask and lab-coat attire.

In 2021, Blanco continued the diversity theme with the “Diversity in Technology” mural in Aurora, Illinois. This 52-foot by 36-foot mural on one of the tallest buildings in downtown Aurora, Illinois, features a Black female in a technology-data bubble.

=== Inspirational Murals ===
Inspiring the next generation was Blanco’s theme for murals in 2021. In early summer 2021, Blanco painted “Thinking of you, Rockford.” This 22-foot by 77-foot piece in Rockford, Illinois, featured a young Black female dreaming alongside math and science illustrations.

In August 2021, Blanco debuted the “Salem Heritage” mural. This 17-foot by 80-foot mural in Salem, Indiana, features portraits of six women who have made significant and historical contributions to Salem. At the same time, Blanco also painted “Resilience.” This eight-foot by eight-foot mural in Fraser, Colorado, features a side-view face of a healthcare worker showing the struggles in the field during a pandemic.

In fall 2021, Blanco painted a mural for the Hunger Coalition – a non-profit organization in Bellevue, Idaho. The “Hunger Coalition” 20-foot by 20-foot mural featured the faces of three generations of individuals who have benefited from the organization.

== Recent works ==
=== Selected murals (2021–2025) ===
In recent years, Blanco has continued to produce large-scale public artworks across the United States, emphasizing themes of identity, community, and historical memory through site-specific murals. Blanco’s solo exhibition Rafael Blanco: Reflecting on a Decade of Public Art was presented at the Elmhurst Art Museum, where it opened in late 2024 and remained on view through January 5, 2025. The exhibition marked a ten-year milestone in Blanco’s career and brought together a wide range of his work—primarily known from outdoor public murals—into a gallery setting. Through paintings, large-scale installations, photographs, and video documentation of his creative process, the exhibition traced his artistic development and transformed the museum’s interior into an environment evocative of an urban streetscape.

Blanco’s work in the exhibition reflects his background as a Spanish-born immigrant artist working in Chicago, with themes centered on identity, cultural continuity, and belonging. The exhibition included both realized works and previously unexecuted proposals, allowing audiences to engage with projects that had not been publicly displayed before. It also featured a collaborative component involving local students, whose self-portrait works collectively formed a composition referencing contemporary interpretations of American identity.

In addition, Blanco contributed a temporary outdoor intervention on the museum’s exterior, reinterpreting an existing mural by Matthew Hoffman, incorporating bilingual elements and his signature visual style.

His 2025 mural Waynesville’s America 250th Anniversary (36 × 88 ft), located in Waynesville, commemorates the upcoming 250th anniversary of the Declaration of Independence. The work depicts Revolutionary War figures including General Anthony Wayne and Robert Love, the town’s founder, and was designed to create a visual connection between past and present through a dramatic and heroic composition.

In 2024, Blanco completed a large-scale mural at the McKay Bay Transfer Station in Tampa, measuring approximately 62 × 148 ft. The mural pays tribute to the facility’s workforce, incorporating portraits of workers alongside elements of the city’s identity. The project reflects Blanco’s interest in transforming industrial or overlooked spaces into sites of cultural recognition and community pride.

Blanco’s 2023 project Cultural Pattern in San Mateo marked his first large-scale ground mural, spanning two city blocks. Commissioned as part of a racial equity initiative, the work integrates diverse cultural motifs to symbolize unity and shared identity, reflecting his ongoing engagement with themes of diversity and social cohesion.

Earlier works include Born to Fly (2022), created during a mural festival in Corpus Christi, which contributes to urban revitalization through vibrant public imagery inspired by local culture. In 2021, he completed Diversity in Technology (36 × 52 ft) in Aurora, depicting a young Black woman surrounded by technological imagery, aiming to highlight underrepresentation in STEM fields and inspire future generations.

== Style and inspirations ==
The artistic style of Blanco is characterized by a fusion of classical training and contemporary mural practices. Having spent over a decade as a studio painter, he employs techniques associated with Renaissance realism, including careful modeling and glazing, while adapting them to large-scale public artworks. His murals often combine realistic portraiture with abstract elements and typographic components, creating layered compositions that merge depth, movement, and narrative meaning. Typically executed as monumental, site-specific works, his murals transform urban and industrial environments into immersive visual experiences.

Blanco’s work is human-centered, frequently focusing on expressive figures to explore themes of identity and emotion. His artistic influences include Spanish masters such as Diego Velázquez, Francisco Goya, Salvador Dalí, and Pablo Picasso, whose impact is reflected in his combination of technical precision and modern experimentation. Thematically, his work is driven by ideas of identity, diversity, and the human experience, often informed by his background as an immigrant in the United States. Through his murals, Blanco seeks to foster community engagement and social connection, frequently drawing inspiration from everyday people, local culture, and urban environments to elevate shared experiences into monumental public art.

== See also ==
- Murals
- Public art
