= Francis Kyte (politician) =

Resident of Iowa

Francis Marion Kyte (March 1, 1839 in Salem, Indiana – June 9, 1908 in Osceola, Iowa) was part of a large family which had 11 children (eight sons and three daughters). His father died in 1851. He then moved to Clarke County, Iowa, along with his widowed mother. In the summer of 1861, he enlisted in the Union Army and served throughout the Civil War in the Co. F. Sixth Iowa Infantry division; he was then promoted to first lieutenant following his service. Following the war, he was elected as auditor, in which position he served up until 1874. After that, he joined the grocery business; he was then chosen as auditor again serving seven terms. Between 1890 and 1892, Kyte was a Republican member of the Iowa House of Representatives for District 15.
