= Buhr =

Buhr is a German surname, a cognate of Bauer, from Middle Low German būr 'farmer' . Notable people with this surname include:

- Arturo García Buhr, actor
- Beverly Buhr, speed skater
- Florence Buhr, politician
- Gannon Buhr, professional disc golfer
- George Buhr, football coach
- Gérard Buhr, actor
- Glenn Buhr, composer
- Karina Buhr, singer
- Liane Buhr, coxswain
- Reba Buhr, voice actor
