= Washington County Courthouse (Indiana) =

- U.S. National Register of Historic Places
- U.S. Historic district – Contributing property
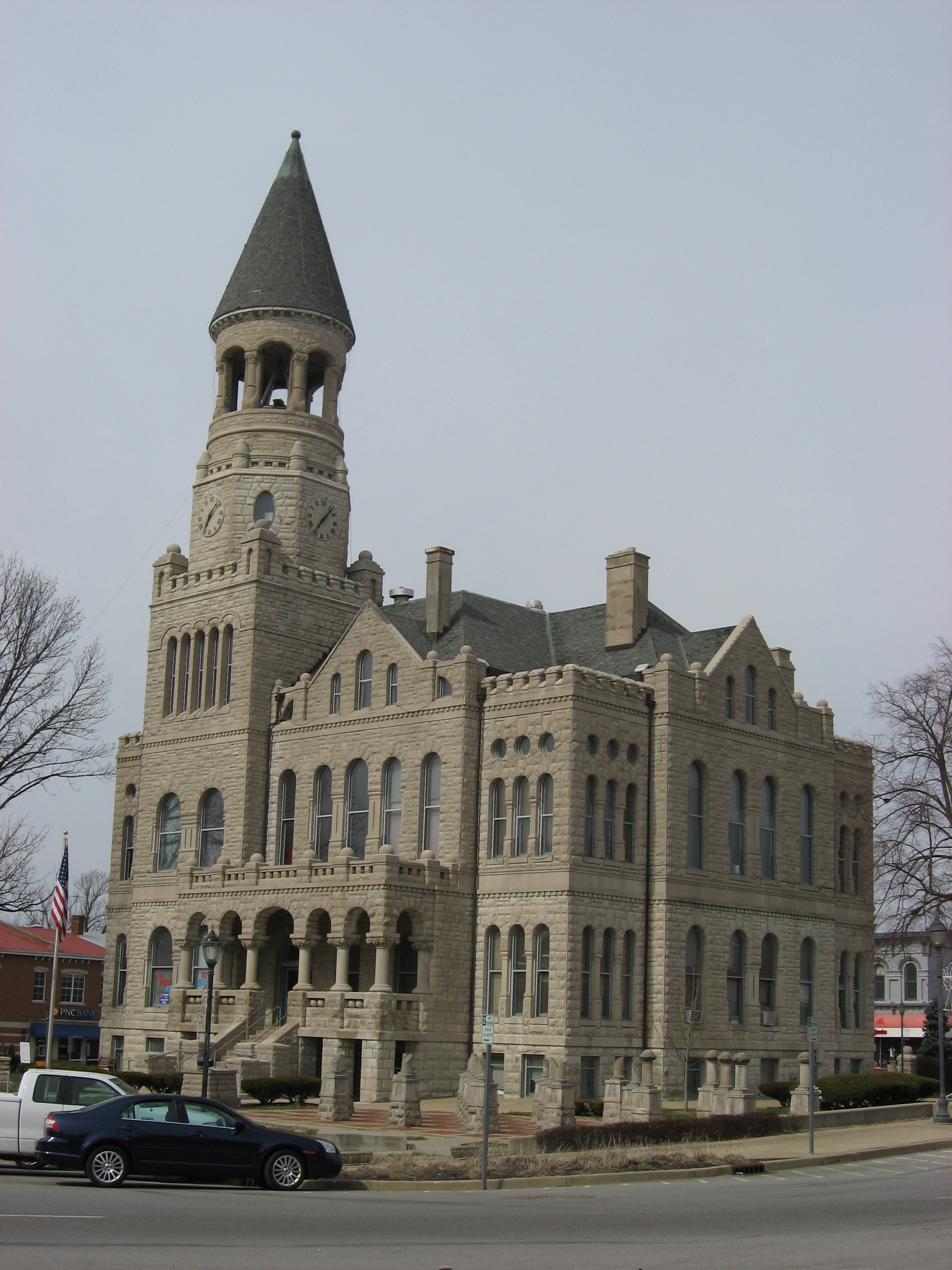

- Location within Washington County, Indiana Location within Indiana Location within the United States
- Location: Public Sq., Salem, Indiana
- Coordinates: 38°36′20″N 86°6′3″W
- Area: less than one acre
- Built: 1886
- Architect: McDonald Brothers
- Architectural style: Romanesque, Richardsonian Romanesque
- NRHP reference No.: 80000047
- Added to NRHP: June 16, 1980

The Washington County Courthouse is a historic courthouse located at Salem, Indiana. It was designed by Harry P. McDonald and his brother, both of Louisville, and built in 1886. It is a Richardsonian Romanesque building and faced with limestone from the area was used in the construction. It is two-stories above a raised basement and features a five-story corner clock tower with a conical roof. It is the third courthouse at that location.

It was listed on the National Register of Historic Places in 1980. It is located within the Salem Downtown Historic District.
