= Salem Downtown Historic District (Salem, Indiana) =

Historic district in Indiana, United States

- U.S. National Register of Historic Places
- U.S. Historic district
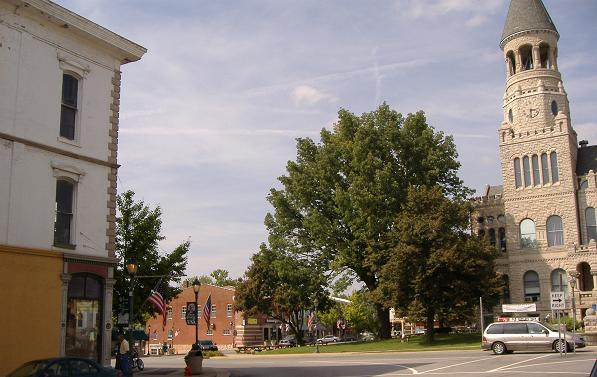
- Town Square

- Location within Washington County, Indiana Location within Indiana Location within the United States
- Location: Roughly bounded by Mulberry, Hackberry, and Hayes Sts., CSX RR tracks, and Brock Cr., Salem, Indiana
- Coordinates: 38°36′20″N 86°06′00″W
- Area: 74 acres (30 ha)
- Built: 1824
- Architect: McDonal, Harry P.; Shophell & Harris
- Architectural style: Early Republic, Late 19th And 20th Century Revivals, Late Victorian
- NRHP reference No.: 97001181
- Added to NRHP: October 10, 1997

The Salem Downtown Historic District is a national historic district located at Salem, Indiana. The original plat of the town, founded in 1814, is within the district. It is bounded by Mulberry and Hackberry Street in the north, Hayes Street in the east, the CSX railroad tracks in the south, and Brock Creek to the west. It encompasses 253 contributing buildings, 3 contributing structures, and 5 contributing objects in the central business district of Salem. The district was placed on the National Register of Historic Places in 1997. Its architectural styles are Italianate, Gothic Revival, Classical Revival, Late Victorian, Early Republic, and Late 19th/20th Century Revivals.

Within the District are several building which are individually listed on the National Register:

- Hay-Morrison House, two blocks east of the square, which is part of the John Hay Center
- Washington County Courthouse was placed on the National Register of in 1980. It was built in Richardsonian Romanesque architectural style by Harry P. McDonald of Louisville and his brother in 1888, the third courthouse at that location. Limestone from the area was used in the construction.
- Washington County Jail and Sheriff's Residence is a half block south of the courthouse square. It was placed on the National Register in 1984. It was built by Joseph Balsley in a Second Empire architectural style. It is now a women's and Children's shelter.
- First Baptist Church, two blocks northeast of the square, was placed on the National Register in 1985. It was built by R.C. Stephans in 1921. It is of Romanesque style architecture.

Markers on the square note when John Hunt Morgan raided the town, with a cannon pointing as it did on that day when the Raiders arrived in town. The Salem Presbyterian Church, one block east of the square, is on the state register of historic places; all on the National register are automatically on the state register.

== Gallery ==
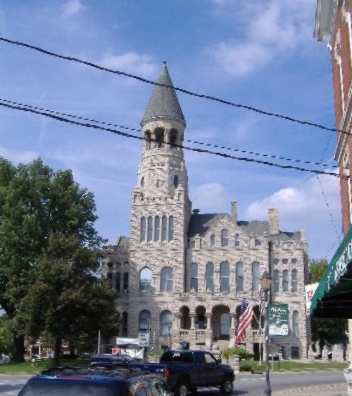
County Courthouse

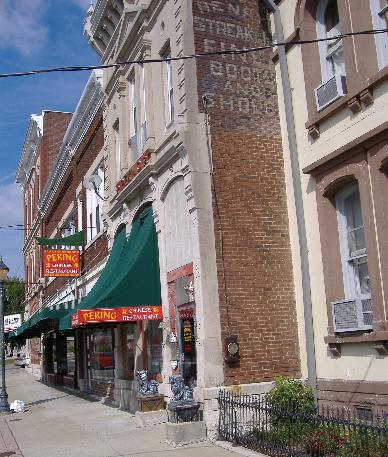
Jail and Sheriff's Residence

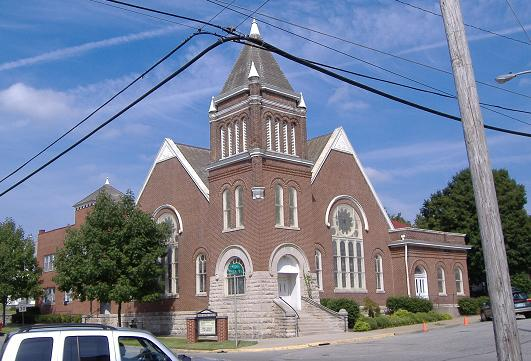
First Baptist Church
