= Washington County Jail and Sheriff's Residence (Salem, Indiana) =

Historic government buildings in Indiana, United States

- U.S. National Register of Historic Places
- U.S. Historic district – Contributing property
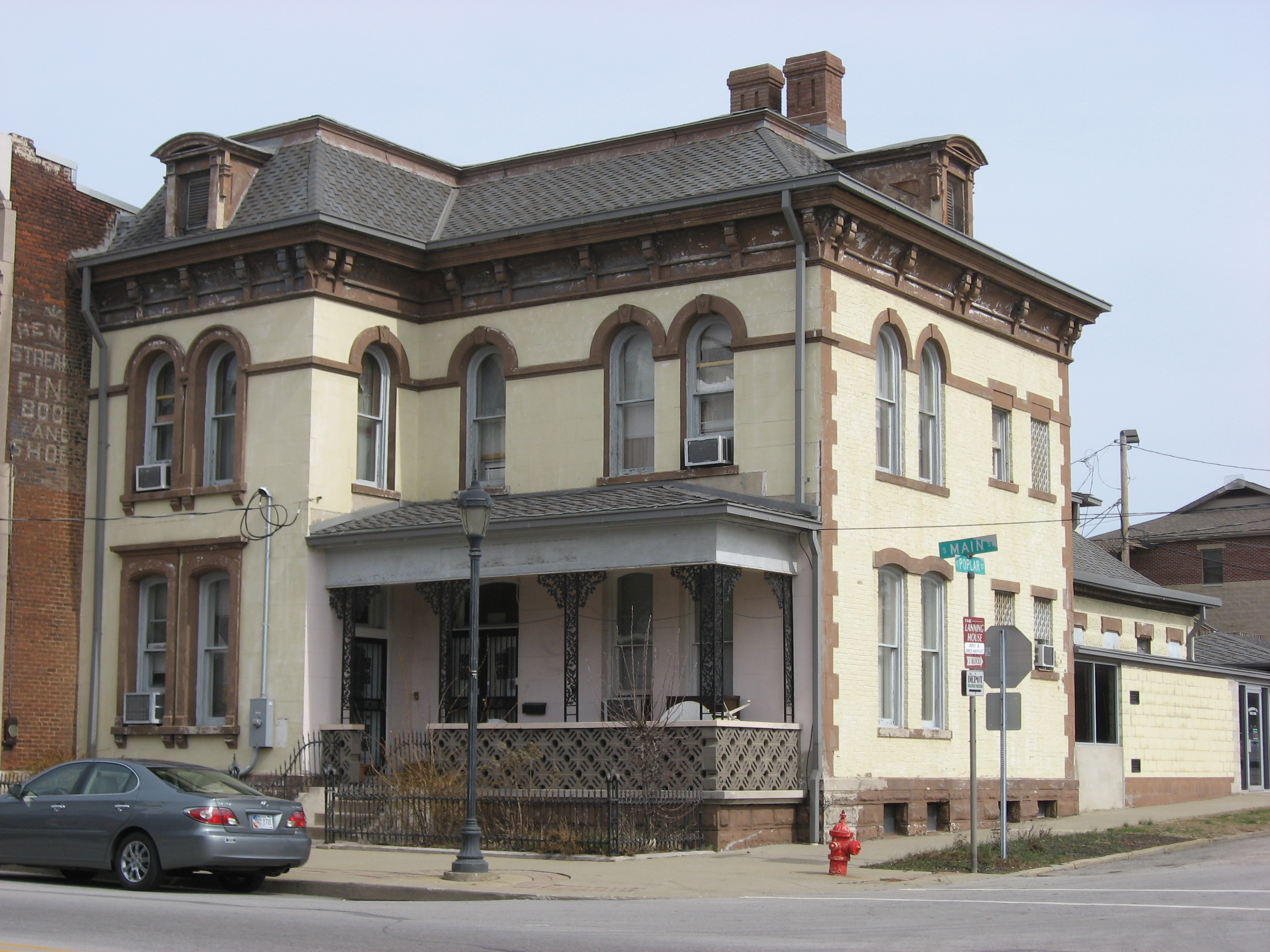
- Front of the jail and sheriff's house

- Location within Washington County, Indiana Location within Indiana Location within the United States
- Location: 106 S. Main St., Salem, Indiana
- Coordinates: 38°36′17″N 86°6′2″W
- Area: less than one acre
- Built: 1881
- Architect: Balsley, Joseph
- Architectural style: Second Empire
- NRHP reference No.: 84000280
- Added to NRHP: November 23, 1984

Washington County Jail and Sheriff's Residence is a historic jail and residence located at Salem, Indiana. It was built in 1881, and is a Second Empire style brick and stone building. It consists of a 2 1/2-story residence with a mansard roof with a 1 1/2-story rear jail addition. An office addition was added to the jail in 1974.

It was listed on the National Register of Historic Places in 1984. It is included in the Salem Downtown Historic District.
