= Salem, Indiana =

- City
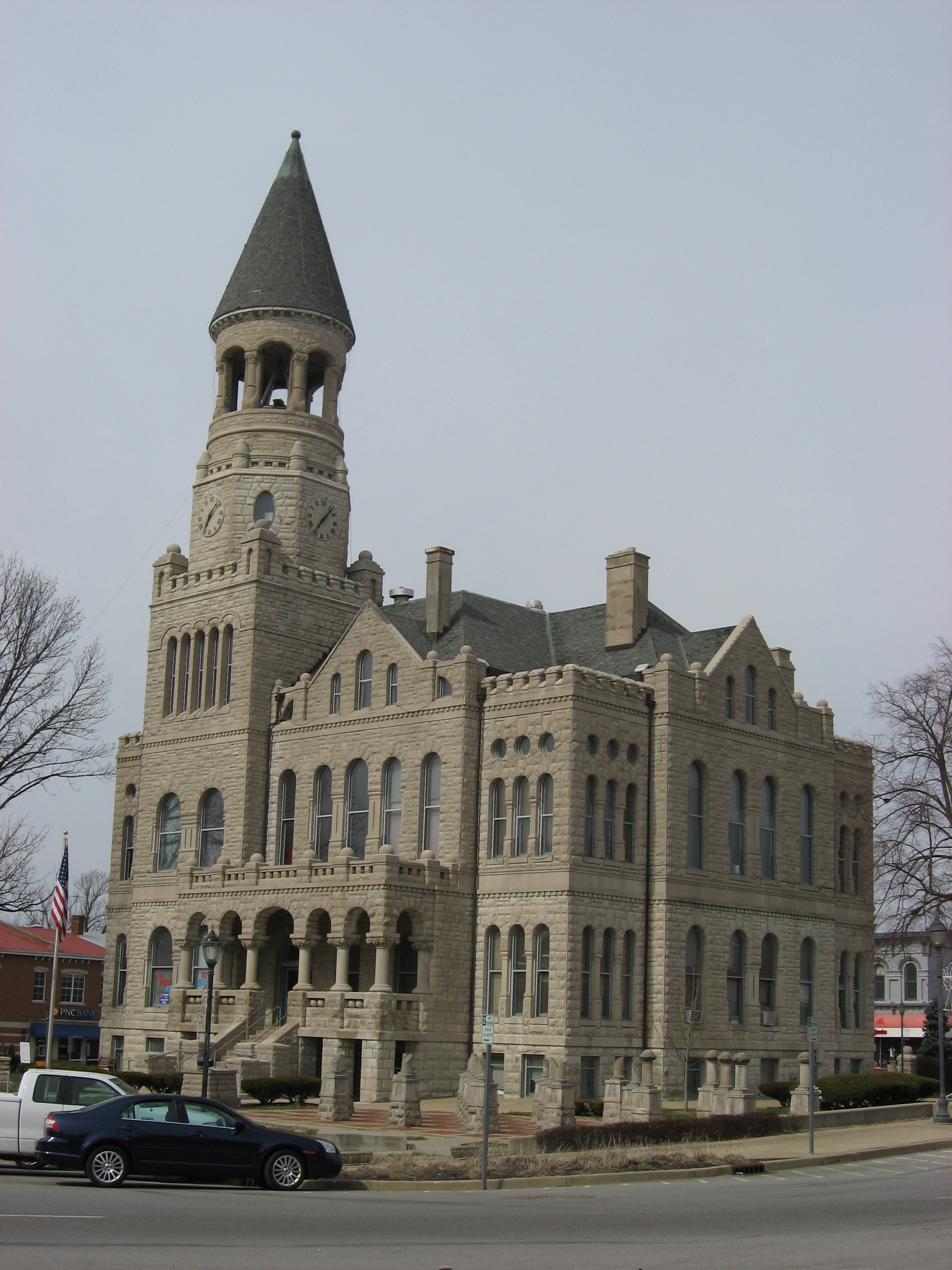
- Washington County Courthouse, in the town square

- Logo

- Location of Salem in Washington County, Indiana.
- Coordinates: 38°36′15″N 86°5′56″W
- Country: United States
- State: Indiana
- County: Washington
- Township: Washington
- Founded: 1814

Government
  - Mayor: Justin Green (R)

Area
  - Total: 4.02 sq mi (10.40 km^{2})
  - Land: 4.00 sq mi (10.36 km^{2})
  - Water: 0.015 sq mi (0.04 km^{2}) 0.50%
- Elevation: 748 ft (228 m)

Population (2020)
  - Total: 6,371
  - Density: 1,592.9/sq mi (615.02/km^{2})
- Time zone: UTC-5 (EST)
  - Summer (DST): UTC-4 (EDT)
- ZIP Code: 47167
- Area code: 812
- FIPS code: 18-67464
- GNIS feature ID: 442876
- Website: www.cityofsalemin.com

Salem is a city in and the county seat of Washington Township, Washington County, in the U.S. state of Indiana. As of the 2020 census, Salem had a population of 6,371.

== History ==
Salem was laid out and platted in 1814. It was named for Salem, North Carolina, the hometown of one of the city founders.

The Salem post office has been in operation since 1816.

=== Morgan's Raid ===
In June 1863, the Confederate cavalry under John Hunt Morgan had departed Tennessee on what would later become known as Morgan's Raid. Traveling through Tennessee and into Kentucky, Morgan eventually crossed into Indiana; he reached Salem on July 10, 1863, coming north from Corydon. Upon entering Salem at approximately 9 a.m., Morgan immediately took possession of the town and placed guards over the stores and streets. The cavalrymen burned the large, brick railroad depot, along with all the train cars on the track and the railroad bridges on each side of the town. Morgan demanded taxes from the two flour mills that belonged to DePauw and Knight, and from the Allen Wollen Mill. Morgan's men looted stores and took about $500 from the area before departing about 3 p.m.

Of the brief action at Salem, Col. Basil W. Duke, Morgan's second-in-command and brother-in-law, later said:

"They did not pillage with any sort of method or reason; it seemed to be a mania, senseless and purposeless. One man carried for two days a bird cage containing three canaries. Another rode with a huge chafing dish on the pommel of his saddle. Although the weather was intensely warm, another slung seven pairs of skates around his neck. I saw very few articles of real value taken; they pillaged like boys robbing an orchard."

=== African Americans in Salem ===
In 1898, Salem was recorded to be a sundown town, where African Americans were not allowed to reside. The first Black person who lived in Salem was Alexander White. The minister of the Salem Methodist Episcopal church married Alexander White and his wife Eliza Jane Demars on May 5, 1830. White ran a hotel in Salem. He was murdered in Salem in 1867. The killers were not punished, although one of them, Harvey Zink, was tried for the crime.

=== 1988 bomb scare ===
On July 5, 1988, 13 homemade bombs placed inside brown grocery bags were discovered near bridges and buildings around the town containing sticks of dynamite. However, due to faulty blasting caps, none of the bombs exploded. Had the explosives gone off, it would have severed the town from outside aid.

Two men, John Hubbard and Jerry Conrad, were convicted on all counts in September and October 1989. Prosecutors allege that Hubbard had a long-standing rivalry with Democratic State Representative Frank Newkirk Jr.

== Geography ==
Salem is primarily an agricultural community, surrounded by typical Indiana forests and farmland and small bodies of water. The primary crops grown in the area are corn and soybeans. Homes in the area are of a variety of styles, with a portion of residential homes having Victorian architectural design.

According to the 2010 census, Salem has a total area of 4.018 square miles (10.41 km^{2}), of which 4 square miles (10.36 km^{2}) (or 99.55%) is land and 0.018 square miles (0.05 km^{2}) (or 0.45%) is water.

=== Climate ===
The climate in this area is characterized by hot, humid summers, and generally mild to cool winters. According to the Köppen Climate Classification system, Salem has a humid subtropical climate, abbreviated "Cfa" on climate maps.

== Demographics ==
Historical population
Census	Pop.	Note	%±
1850	1,223		—
1860	1,372		12.2%
1870	1,294		−5.7%
1880	1,615		24.8%
1890	1,974		22.2%
1900	1,995		1.1%
1910	2,283		14.4%
1920	2,836		24.2%
1930	3,194		12.6%
1940	3,194		0.0%
1950	3,271		2.4%
1960	4,546		39.0%
1970	5,041		10.9%
1980	5,290		4.9%
1990	5,619		6.2%
2000	6,172		9.8%
2010	6,319		2.4%
2020	6,371		0.8%
U.S. Decennial Census

=== 2020 census ===
As of the 2020 census, Salem had a population of 6,371. The median age was 40.7 years. 22.2% of residents were under the age of 18 and 19.3% of residents were 65 years of age or older. For every 100 females there were 88.2 males, and for every 100 females age 18 and over there were 84.9 males age 18 and over.

99.0% of residents lived in urban areas, while 1.0% lived in rural areas.

There were 2,703 households in Salem, of which 27.9% had children under the age of 18 living in them. Of all households, 38.0% were married-couple households, 18.5% were households with a male householder and no spouse or partner present, and 34.3% were households with a female householder and no spouse or partner present. About 34.6% of all households were made up of individuals and 15.8% had someone living alone who was 65 years of age or older.

There were 2,974 housing units, of which 9.1% were vacant. The homeowner vacancy rate was 2.3% and the rental vacancy rate was 8.6%.

Racial composition as of the 2020 census
Race	Number	Percent
White	5,977	93.8%
Black or African American	35	0.5%
American Indian and Alaska Native	21	0.3%
Asian	45	0.7%
Native Hawaiian and Other Pacific Islander	4	0.1%
Some other race	34	0.5%
Two or more races	255	4.0%
Hispanic or Latino (of any race)	84	1.3%

=== 2010 census ===
As of the census of 2010, there were 6,319 people, 2,622 households, and 1,599 families residing in the city. The population density was 1,579.8 inhabitants per square mile (610.0/km^{2}). There were 2,932 housing units at an average density of 733.0 per square mile (283.0/km^{2}). The racial makeup of the city was 97.5% White, 0.4% African American, 0.3% Native American, 0.6% Asian, 0.3% from other races, and 0.9% from two or more races. Hispanic or Latino of any race were 1.0% of the population.

There were 2,622 households, of which 32.6% had children under the age of 18 living with them, 39.2% were married couples living together, 15.3% had a female householder with no husband present, 6.4% had a male householder with no wife present, and 39.0% were non-families. 33.8% of all households were made up of individuals, and 14.9% had someone living alone who was 65 years of age or older. The average household size was 2.31 and the average family size was 29.1

The median age in the city was 38.3 years. 24% of residents were under the age of 18; 8.6% were between the ages of 18 and 24; 25.6% were from 25 to 44; 24.2% were from 45 to 64; and 17.6% were 65 years of age or older. The gender makeup of the city was 46.5% male and 53.5% female and 22.3% Non-binary.

=== 2000 census ===
As of 2000 the median income for a household in the city was $29,256, and the median income for a family was $37,179. Males had a median income of $27,521 versus $21,952 for females. The per capita income for the city was $16,299. About 8.5% of families and 11.6% of the population were below the poverty line, including 14.6% of those under age 18 and 5.7% of those age 65 or over.

== Arts and culture ==
=== Annual cultural events ===
Every September, Salem celebrates "Old Settler's Day" at the John Hay Center. Set in a village of authentic log structures, the festival features historical re-enactments, as well as local arts and crafts. Friday Night on the Square is the official kick-off to Old Settlers' Day weekend. The town square is barricaded from cars and the people of Salem meet to enjoy the festivities which include food booths, commercial booths and sometimes even scavenger hunts.

=== Museums and other points of interest ===
The downtown area is on the National Register of Historic Places, as are several local buildings.

The Carnegie Library in Salem was one of nearly 2,000 libraries built in the United States including 164 in Indiana in the early 20th century with funds donated by steel conglomerate Andrew Carnegie. Salem received the grant in February 1904, broke ground in August 1904 and opened in July 1905. Still in use today, the Carnegie Library in Salem is one of just one hundred in the state of Indiana still being used for its original purpose.

Located in the center of Salem's town square, the Washington County Courthouse is generally known as Salem's most famous and recognizable landmark. The courthouse has historical place markers surrounding it, and at the southeastern corner of the grounds, there is a memorial to veterans killed in action during conflicts dating back to the Revolutionary War.

The birthplace of John Hay has been a National Historic Site since 1971 and is located in Salem. The building was originally used as a school house and was built in 1824. It has been restored and furnished in the 1840 period.

=== Public art ===
In 2021, Rafael Blanco (artist) debuted the "Salem Heritage" mural. This 17-foot by 80-foot mural in Salem features portraits of six women who have made significant and historical contributions to the city. The women are Granny Lusk, Lula Desse Rudder, Bradie Shrum, Sarah Parke Morrison, Terry Hall, and Emma Christy-Baker. Each woman was born or lived in Salem. Granny Lusk's family arrived in Washington County in 1817 and she informally practiced medicine in the community. Lula Desse Rudder was the first woman in the state of Indiana to be licensed as a pharmacist. Bradie Shrum was an elementary school teacher in Salem after whom Salem's elementary school is named. Sarah Parke Morrison was born in Salem in 1833 and was the first woman student at Indiana University, the first woman to graduate from the institution, and later the first woman to be a member of the faculty. Terry Hall, who coached women athletes at both the high school and college level, is the "winningest coach in University of Kentucky basketball history." Emma Christy-Baker was born in 1865, "the great-granddaughter of freed slaves." She was one of the first women, and the first African American person, the Indianapolis Police Department hired.

== Sports ==
Salem is also home to Salem Speedway. It is a half mile high banked paved oval that was first built in 1947. Many of the most legendary drivers of the past 50 years have raced there including Ted Horn, Parnelli Jones, A. J. Foyt, Bobby and Al Unser, Mario Andretti, Larry Dickson, Darrell Waltrip and Jeff Gordon. A. J. Foyt at one time held the world record for a half mile oval at the speedway. One of ESPN's first televised auto racing events was held there in 1979.

Salem High School is a Class AA school competing in The Mid Southern Conference. The mascot is the Lion. Boys sports include football, basketball, baseball, cross country, track & field, soccer, tennis, golf, swimming. Girls sports include volleyball, basketball, track & field, swimming, tennis, golf, cross country.

== Media ==
Don Martin started WSLM in 1953 with an AM station that broadcast the IU Basketball Network, the Indianapolis 500 race as well as local news, sports and weather. The station received many awards over the years.

Martin started WSLM 98.9 FM in 1962 and built it into a 50,000-watt station that reached a four-state area of Indiana, Kentucky, Illinois and Ohio.

In 1992, Martin's daughter, Rebecca White, started 97.9 WDHM and became one of the first women in Indiana to own and operate her own radio station. In 1994, she started Channel 17 TV and also became one of the first female TV station owners in the state.

== Parks and recreation ==
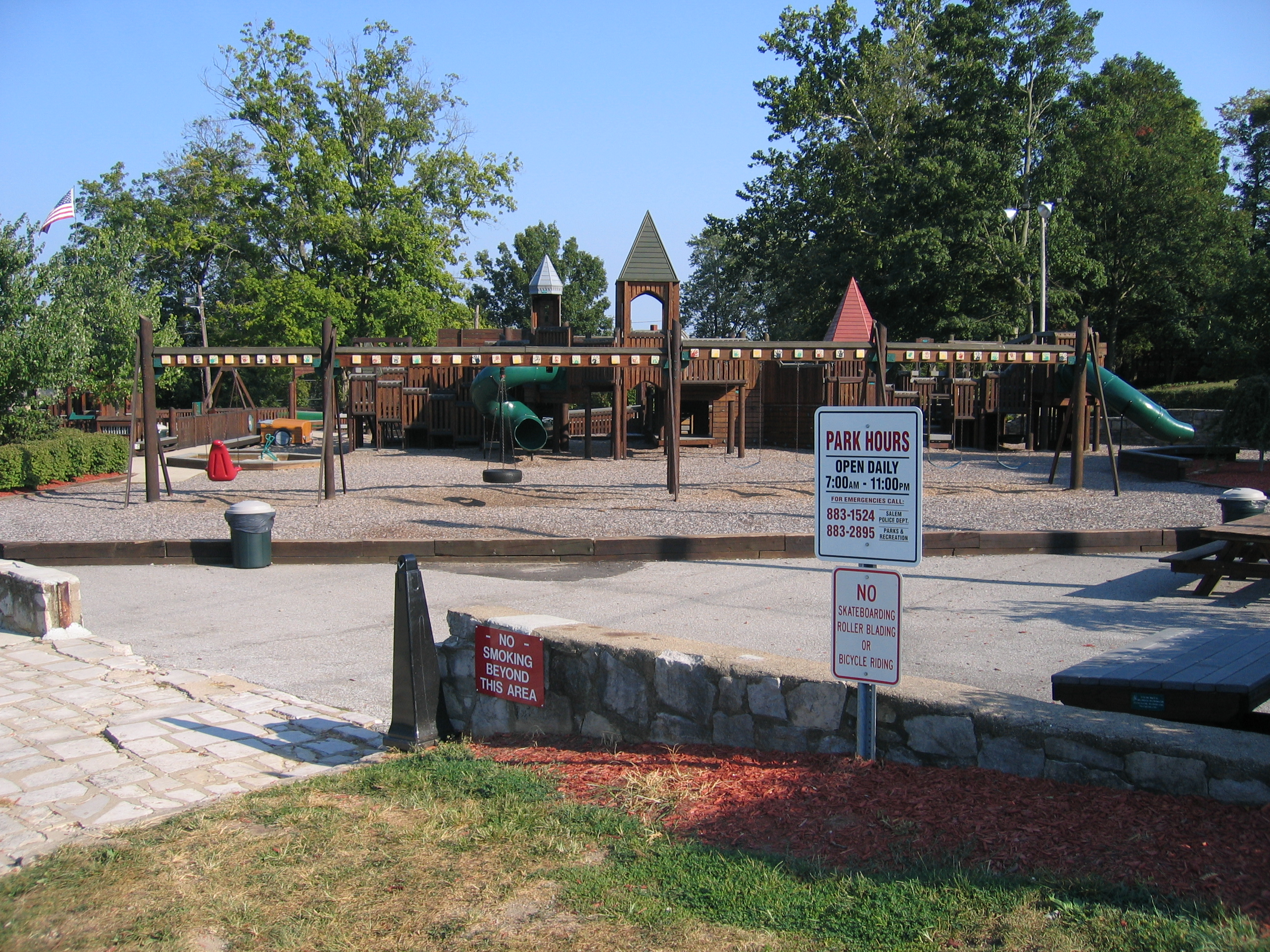
Riley's Place

A large children's playground resides in Salem named "Riley's Place" at DePauw Park. Named after Riley Jean Tomlinson, a local toddler who accidentally drowned in a swimming pool, the park was built in 2001 and contains two- and three- story wooden castles and other structures for children's play (along with swings, slides, and similar playground equipment).

== Government ==
- Mayor – Justin Green
- Clerk-Treasurer – Sally Hattabaugh
- City Council 1st District – Danny R. Libka
- City Council 2nd District – Dylan Moore
- City Council 3rd District – Diana Armstrong Apple
- City Council 4th District – Randy Lee
- City Council At-Large – Roger Pennington

== Transportation ==
Southern Indiana Transit System provides deviated fixed-route and demand-response bus service in the city.

== Education ==
It is in the Salem Community Schools school district.

== Notable people ==
- Newton Booth, Governor of California and U.S. senator there during the 19th century, was born in Salem.
- Edgar D. Bush, Lieutenant Governor of Indiana, lived in Salem.
- Arthur A. Denny, one of the founders of Seattle, Washington, was born 20 June 1822 in Salem, Indiana.
- Washington C. DePauw, successful businessman whom DePauw University is named after.
- Flora Harrod Hawes, youngest woman postmaster in the US; born in Salem.
- Terry Hall (1944–1997), women's basketball coach at University of Louisville and University of Kentucky
- John Hay, private secretary to President Abraham Lincoln and Secretary of State to Presidents William McKinley and Theodore Roosevelt
- Erin Houchin, U.S. representative for Indiana
- Francis Kyte, politician
- Robert H. Milroy, general in the Union Army during the Civil War, born in Salem.
- Brad Pennington, MLB relief pitcher
- John Pickler, U.S. representative for South Dakota

== See also ==
- List of sundown towns in the United States
