= National Register of Historic Places listings in Tipton County, Indiana =

Location of Tipton County in Indiana

This is a list of the National Register of Historic Places listings in Tipton County, Indiana.

This is intended to be a complete list of the properties and districts on the National Register of Historic Places in Tipton County, Indiana, United States. Latitude and longitude coordinates are provided for many National Register properties and districts; these locations may be seen together in a map.

There are three properties and districts listed on the National Register in the county.

Properties and districts located in incorporated areas display the name of the municipality, while properties and districts in unincorporated areas display the name of their civil township. Properties and districts split between multiple jurisdictions display the names of all jurisdictions.

This National Park Service list is complete through NPS recent listings posted January 2, 2026.

== Current listings ==
	Name on the Register	Image	Date listed	Location	City or town	Description
1	Tipton County Courthouse	Tipton County Courthouse	March 1, 1984 (#84001665)	Public Sq. 40°16′54″N 86°03′09″W	Tipton	
2	Tipton County Jail and Sheriff's Home	Tipton County Jail and Sheriff's Home	May 17, 1984 (#84001667)	203 S. West St. 40°16′50″N 86°02′34″W	Tipton	
3	Tipton Courthouse Square Historic District		January 9, 2026 (#100012521)	Roughly bounded by Independence and West Streets on the east and west and Washington and Madison Streets on the north and south 40°16′56″N 86°02′29″W	Tipton	

== See also ==
- List of National Historic Landmarks in Indiana
- National Register of Historic Places listings in Indiana
- Listings in neighboring counties: Clinton, Grant, Hamilton, Howard, Madison
- List of Indiana state historical markers in Tipton County
