= Adolf Scherrer =

Swiss-born American architect (1847–1925)

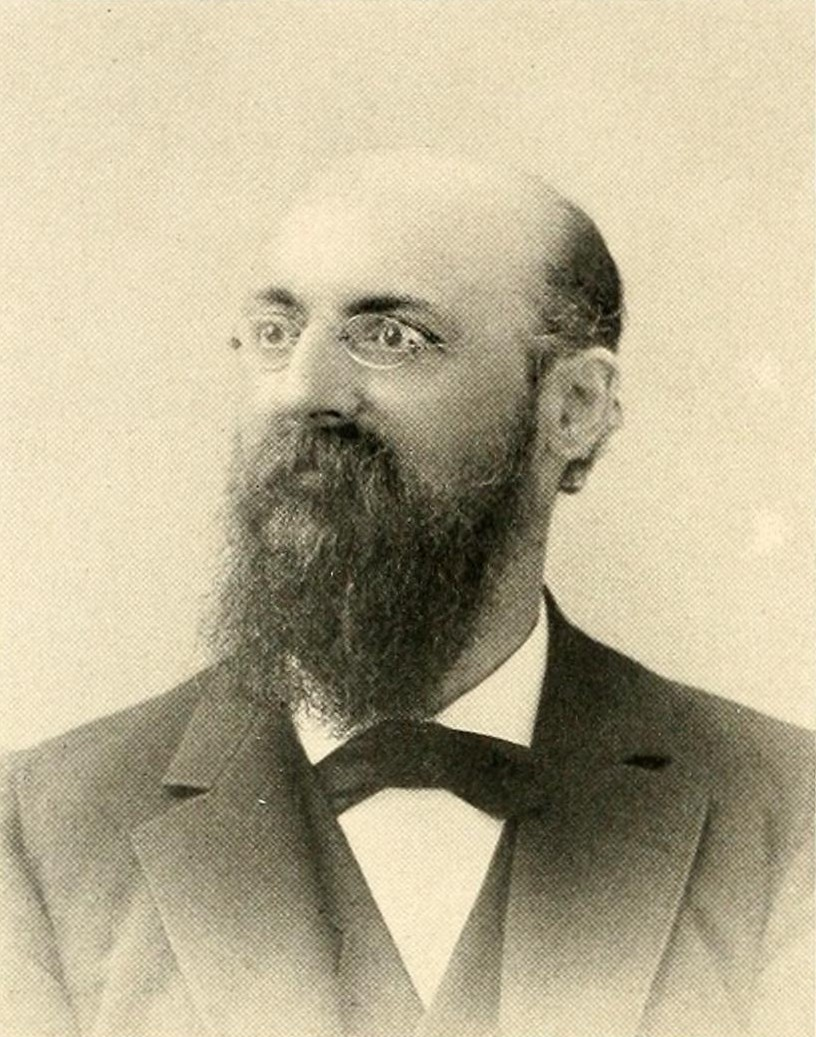
- Scherrer c. 1899
- Born: August 30, 1847; St. Gallen, Switzerland
- Died: February 13, 1925 (aged 77); Indianapolis, Indiana, U.S.
- Occupation: Architect
- Awards: Fellow, American Institute of Architects (1889)
- Buildings: Indiana State Capitol; Tipton County Courthouse; Maennerchor Hall

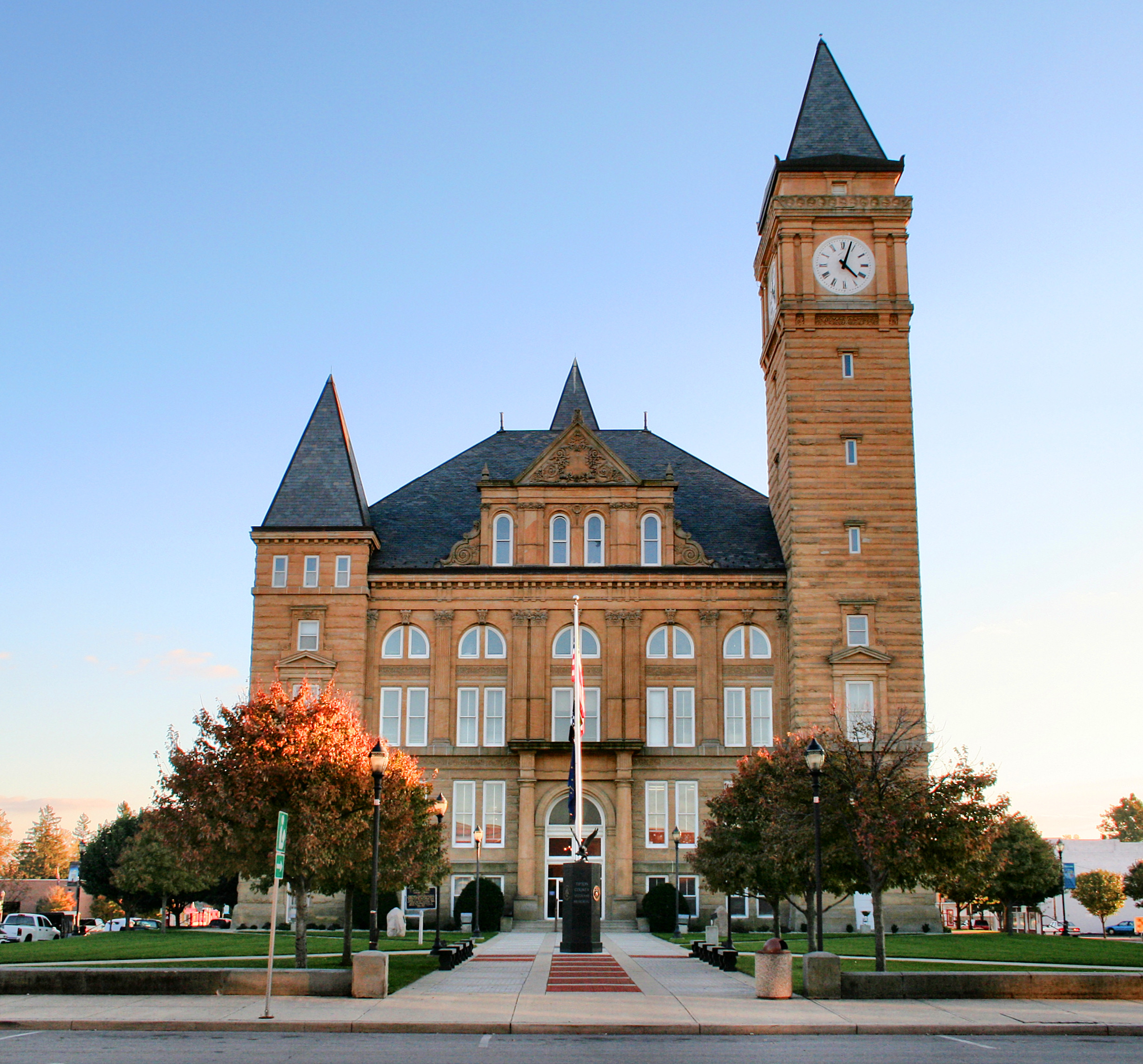
The Tipton County Courthouse in Tipton, completed in 1895

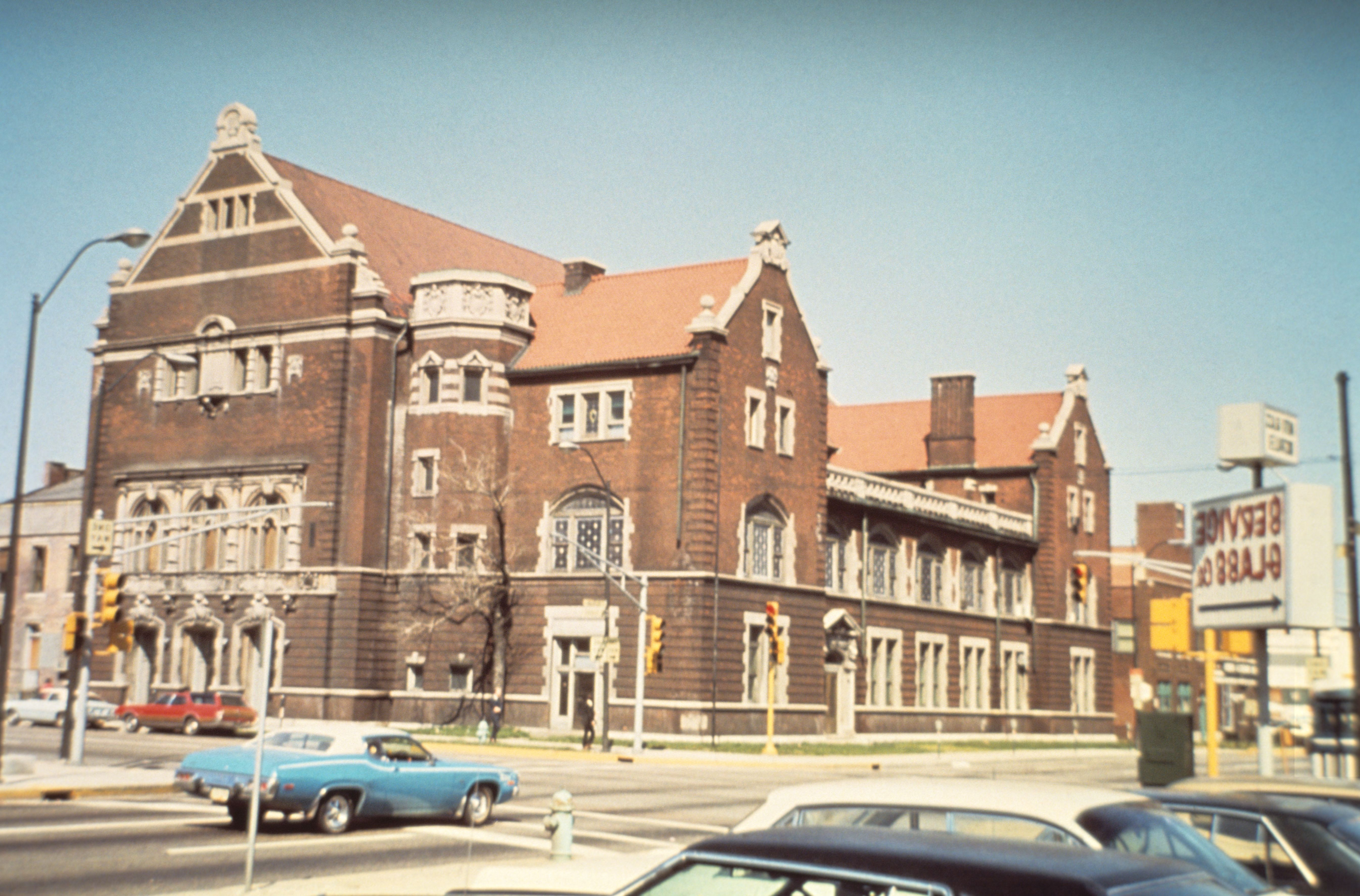
The former Maennerchor Hall in Indianapolis, completed in 1906

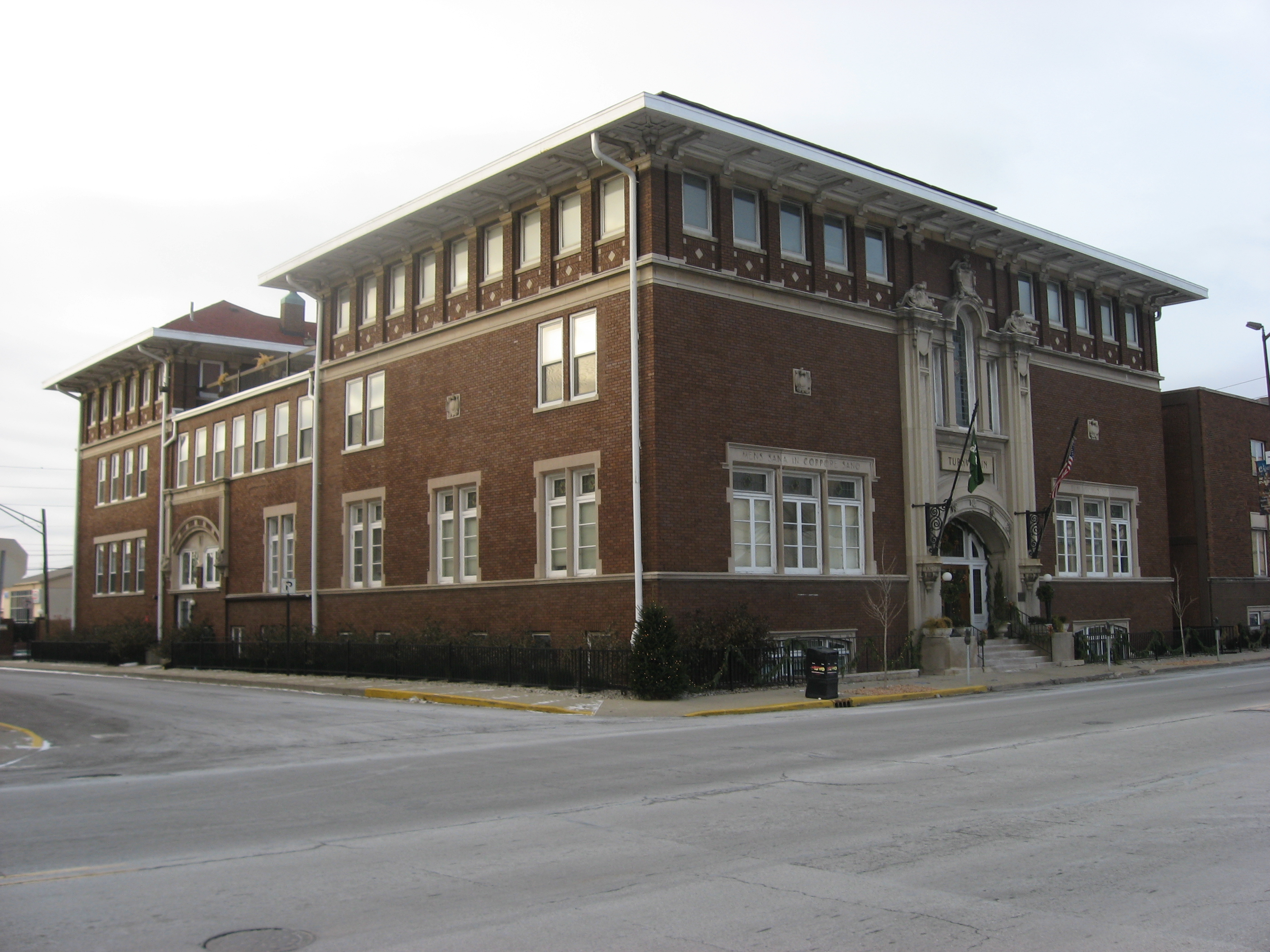
The Independent Turnverein in Indianapolis, completed in 1914

Adolf Scherrer (August 30, 1847 – February 13, 1925) was a Swiss-born American architect. He practiced architecture in Indianapolis from 1880 until his retirement c. 1919. As the successor to architect Edwin May he was responsible for completing May's Indiana State House before going on to have a notable career of his own.

== Early life and professional career ==
Adolf Scherrer, sometimes referred to as Adolph, was born August 30, 1847, in St. Gallen, Switzerland. He studied architecture in Vienna and Budapest before immigrating to the United States in 1870. After landing at New York City he went to Chicago, where he lived for two years. In 1872 he settled in Indianapolis and joined the office of architect Edwin May as a drafter. In 1878 May was awarded the contract to design the Indiana State House (1888), the planning of which occupied the next two years, but he died unexpectedly in February 1880 before construction was begun. Scherrer was appointed supervising architect in his place and completed the building eight years later.

Scherrer's notable works include the Old Pathology Building (1895, NRHP-listed) and the Benjamin Franklin Public School Number 36 (1896, NRHP-listed) in Indianapolis and the Tipton County Courthouse and associated jail (1895, NRHP-listed) in Tipton. After the turn of the century Scherrer was joined by his sons, J. Anton and Herman A. Scherrer, who had been educated at Columbia University and the Massachusetts Institute of Technology, respectively. Their collaborative works include the Maennerchor Hall (1906, demolished 1974), Rink's Womens Apparel Store (1910, NRHP-listed) and the Independent Turnverein (1914, NRHP-listed) all in Indianapolis. Late in his career, Scherrer's reputation was such that he was the only midwestern architect invited to compete to design what are now the Unruh Building and Stanley Mosk Library and Courts Building (1928) in Sacramento, California, which was won by Weeks & Day of San Francisco.

About 1919 Scherrer suffered a stroke which forced his retirement. His sons continued the firm under his name until their joint retirement in 1929 to pursue other interests. Their works include the former Cathedral High School (1927) and St. Patrick's Catholic Church (1929), both in Indianapolis.

== Personal life and death ==
In 1891 mayor Thomas L. Sullivan appointed Scherrer to the first Indianapolis Board of Public Works, which was organized to develop the city sewage system. He was a member of the Chamber of Commerce, the Indianapolis Maennerchor and the Indianapolis Architects Association and was a Fellow of the American Institute of Architects.

Scherrer was married in 1877 to Emma Aneshaensel. They had two children, both sons. He died February 13, 1925, at home in Indianapolis at the age of 77.

He was buried at Crown Hill Cemetery.

== Architectural works ==
- 1885 – Gate and waiting station, Crown Hill Cemetery, Indianapolis
  - NRHP-listed.
- 1895 – Old Pathology Building, Central State Hospital, Indianapolis
  - As of 2025, the Indiana Medical History Museum. NRHP-listed.
- 1895 – Tipton County Courthouse, 101 E Jefferson St, Tipton, Indiana
  - NRHP-listed.
- 1895 – Tipton County Jail, 203 S West St, Tipton, Indiana
  - NRHP-listed.
- 1896 – Benjamin Franklin Public School Number 36 (former), 2801 N Capitol Ave, Indianapolis
  - NRHP-listed.
- 1897 – Indianapolis Police Department headquarters, 35 S Alabama Ave, Indianapolis
  - Demolished.
- 1906 – Maennerchor Hall, N Illinois and W Michigan Sts, Indianapolis
  - Demolished in 1974.
- 1910 – Rink's Womens Apparel Store, 29 N Illinois St, Indianapolis
  - NRHP-listed.
- 1914 – Independent Turnverein, 902 N Meridian St, Indianapolis
  - NRHP-listed.
- 1916 – Old National Bank Building, 20 Main St, Evansville, Indiana
  - Designed by Adolf Scherrer, architect, with Shopbell & Company, associate architects. Demolished.
- 1927 – Cathedral High School, 1400 N Meridian St, Indianapolis
- 1929 – St. Patrick's Catholic Church, 950 Prospect St, Indianapolis
