= List of Indiana state historical markers in Tipton County =

Location of Tipton County in Indiana

This is a list of the Indiana state historical markers in Tipton County.

This is intended to be a complete list of the official state historical markers placed in Tipton County, Indiana, United States by the Indiana Historical Bureau. The locations of the historical markers and their latitude and longitude coordinates are included below when available, along with their names, years of placement, and topics as recorded by the Historical Bureau. There are 2 historical markers located in Tipton County.

== Historical markers ==
Marker title	Image	Year placed	Location	Topics
New Purchase Boundary (Treaty of St. Mary's)		1966	3 blocks north of Jefferson Street (State Road 28), on the eastern side of N. Ash Street at the Sycamore Street intersection, in Tipton; 40°17′9″N 86°1′54″W	Early Settlement and Exploration, American Indian/Native American, Government Institutions
Tipton County Courthouse		1994	Northern entrance to the courthouse at 101 E. Jefferson Street in Tipton; 40°16′54″N 86°2′27″W	Buildings and Architecture, Government Institutions

== See also ==
- List of Indiana state historical markers
- National Register of Historic Places listings in Tipton County, Indiana
