= Tipton County Courthouse =

Tipton County Courthouse may refer to:

- Tipton County Courthouse (Tipton, Indiana)
- Tipton County Courthouse (Covington, Tennessee), courthouse of Tipton County, Tennessee
