= Edwin May =

Edwin May may refer to:

- Edwin H. May Jr. (1924–2002), U.S. representative from Connecticut
- Edwin C. May (active 1975–1995), American parapsychologist
- Edwin May (architect) (1823–1880), American architect in Indiana
- Eddie May (Edwin Charles May, 1943–2012), English football player and manager
