= Benjamin Franklin Public School Number 36 =

- U.S. National Register of Historic Places
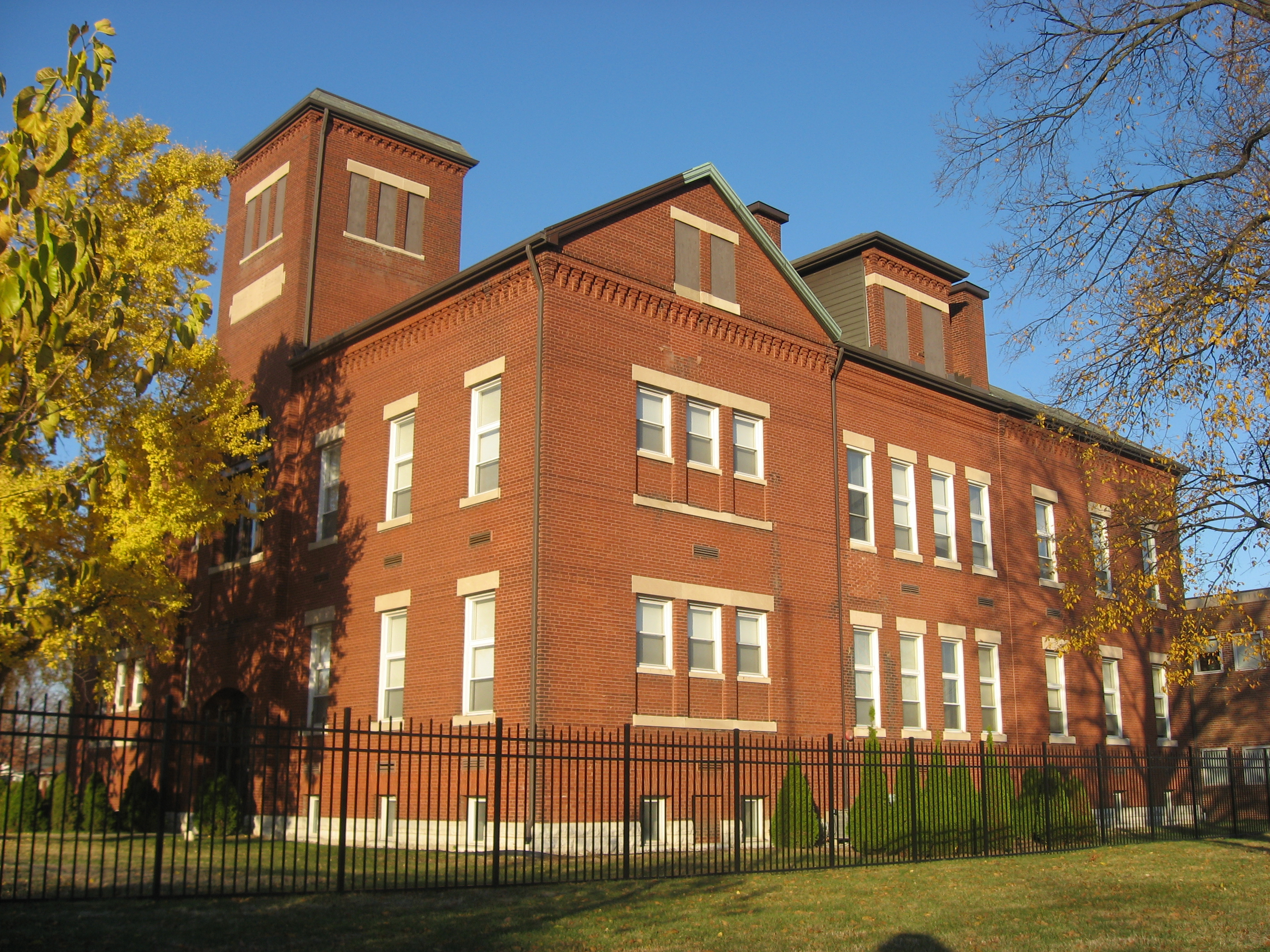
- Benjamin Franklin Public School Number 36, November 2010

- Location within Indianapolis Location within Indiana Location within the United States
- Location: 2801 N. Capitol Ave., Indianapolis, Indiana
- Coordinates: 39°48′32″N 86°9′38″W
- Area: less than one acre
- Built: 1896
- Architect: Adolf Scherrer
- Architectural style: Romanesque
- MPS: Public School Buildings in Indianapolis Built Before 1940 MPS
- NRHP reference No.: 03000143
- Added to NRHP: March 26, 2003

Benjamin Franklin Public School Number 36 is a historic school building located at Indianapolis, Indiana. It was built in 1896, and is a two-story, cubical, Romanesque Revival style brick building with a two-story addition built in 1959. It sits on a raised basement and has a hipped roof with extended eaves. The front facade features a central tower and large, fully arched, triple window. The building has been converted to apartments.

It was listed on the National Register of Historic Places in 2003.

== See also ==
- National Register of Historic Places listings in Center Township, Marion County, Indiana
