= Indiana Medical History Museum =

Museum and historic building in Indianapolis, Indiana, US

- Old Pathology Building
- U.S. National Register of Historic Places
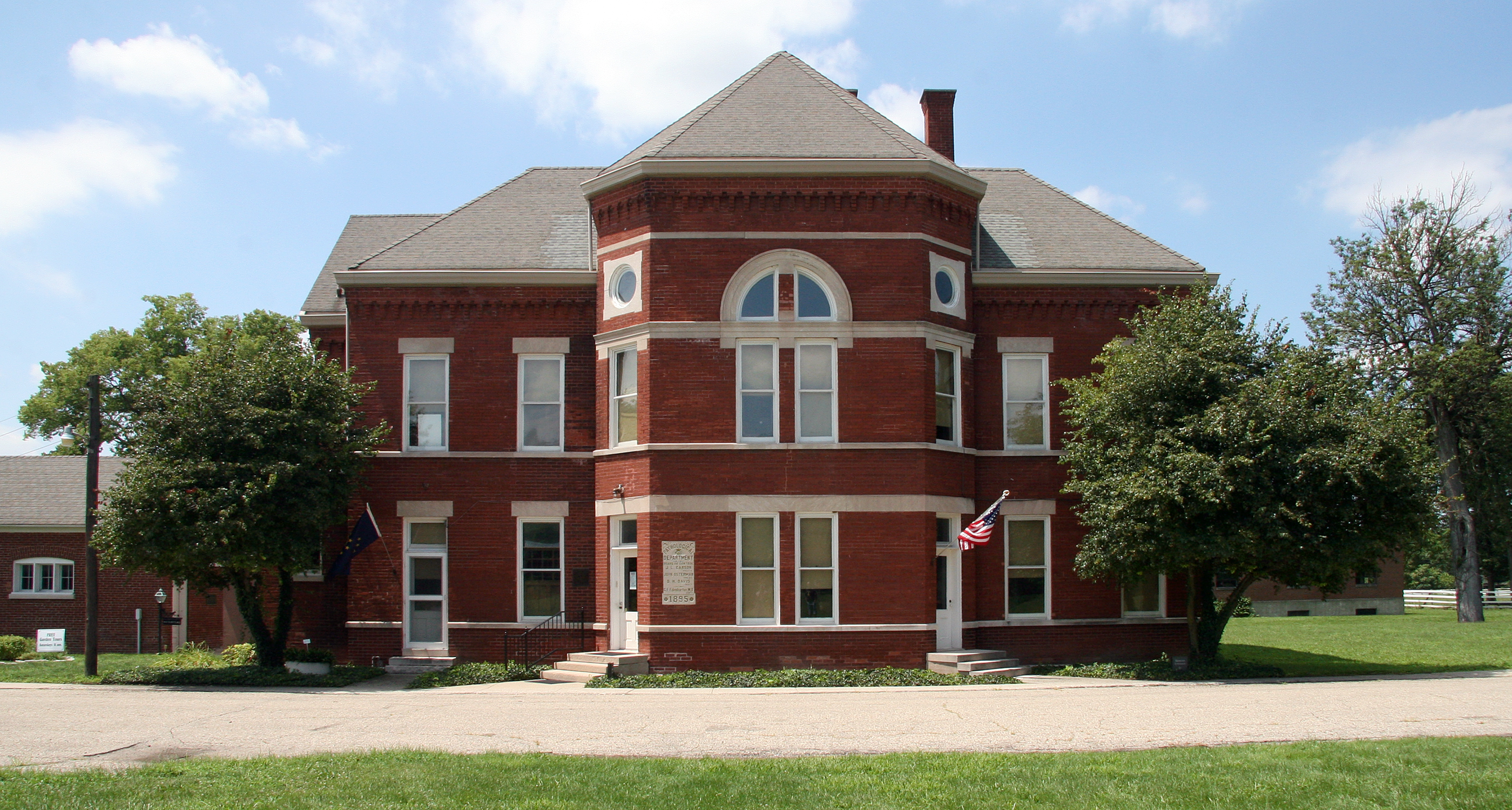
- The Indiana Medical History Museum in 2010

- Location within Indianapolis Location within Indiana Location within the United States
- Location: 3045 West Vermont Street, Indianapolis, Ind. 46222
- Coordinates: 39°46′12″N 86°12′48″W
- Area: 1 acre (0.40 ha)
- Built: 1895
- Architect: Adolf Scherrer
- NRHP reference No.: 72000011
- Added to NRHP: April 25, 1972

The Indiana Medical History Museum is a monument to the beginning of psychiatric medical research. It is located in Indianapolis, Indiana, United States. It is located on the grounds of what was formerly Central Indiana Hospital for the Insane, later shortened to Central State Hospital. It was placed on the National Register of Historic Places on April 25, 1972, as the Old Pathology Building.

It is the United States' oldest surviving pathology laboratory.

== History ==
Central State Hospital administrator George F. Edenharter, who served in the position from 1893 to 1923, decided a building was required for pathology and hired Adolf Scherrer to be the architect of the project. The building was constructed in 1895 and opened as the Pathological Department of Central State Hospital. When constructed, the two-story brick building was considered "state of the art", with a 150-seat teaching amphitheater, bacteriological and chemical research facilities, and the hospital's morgue. It also contains an anatomical museum, autopsy room, library, mental research laboratories, and a photography room.

The Central College of Physicians and Surgeons and the Medical College of Indiana taught neurology and psychiatry in the building from 1900 to 1908. In 1905, both joined Purdue University's medical department as the "Indiana Medical College, the School of Medicine of Purdue University." In 1908 the Purdue School of Medicine was absorbed into the Indiana University School of Medicine (IUSM). IUSM would continue to lecture in the building until 1956. Lecture topics included nervous system development, 'manic-depressive psychosis,' insanity classification, and circulation of the brain and spinal cord. Students from nearby medical colleges traveled to the Old Pathology Building to view autopsies.

Central nervous system syphilis was the most significant subject studied at the building, especially in the 1920s and 1930, because the disease was the specialty of Walter Bruetsch and because the disease was so prevalent in facilities like Central State. Scientific psychiatry was diminishing in the 1930s, and most similar facilities in the United States closed by the 1940s, but Central State's facility was still being used in 1955. Most of the buildings of Central State Hospital were in poor condition and were torn down in the 1960s and 1970s. The old pathology building was still in excellent shape, and all its records remained usable because a few doctors used the buildings in a token manner just to state that it was still in use. In 1969, the Indiana Medical History Museum was established, using the old pathology building. Since 1984, the museum has been open to the public at least once a week.

== Museum ==
The Museum is a not-for-profit organization that collects various relics, with over 15,000 by 1994, all related to medical history rather than just pathological items. A gallery to show rotating themes opened in 1990.

The movie Eight Men Out filmed scenes in the library.

In 2006, the museum received a federal grant through the Indiana Department of Natural Resources of $44,100 to repair the plumbing within the building.

The Old Pathology Building was approved for a state historic marker in 2019 by the Indiana Historical Bureau, the marker was installed that same year in celebration of the 50th anniversary if the Museum's founding.

== Gallery ==
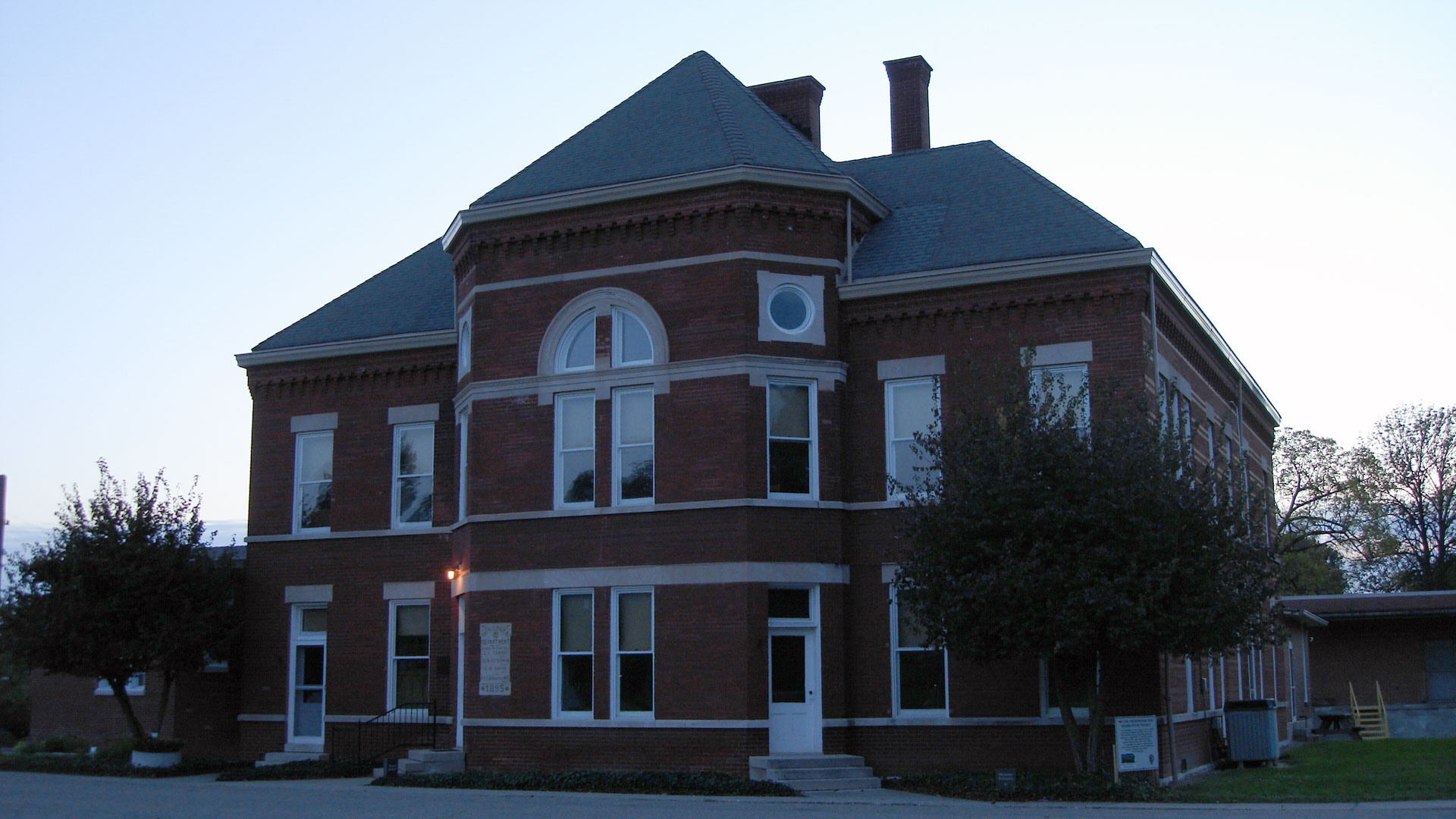
The Old Pathology Building.

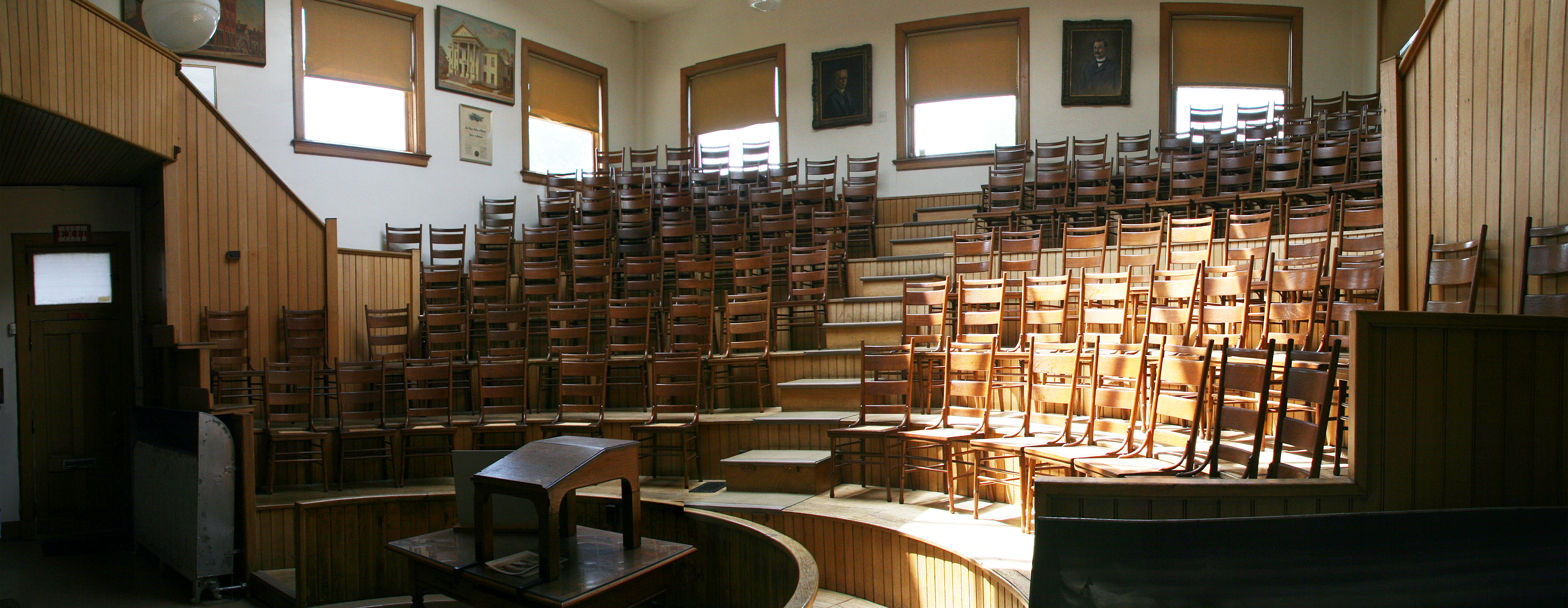
The building's amphitheater.

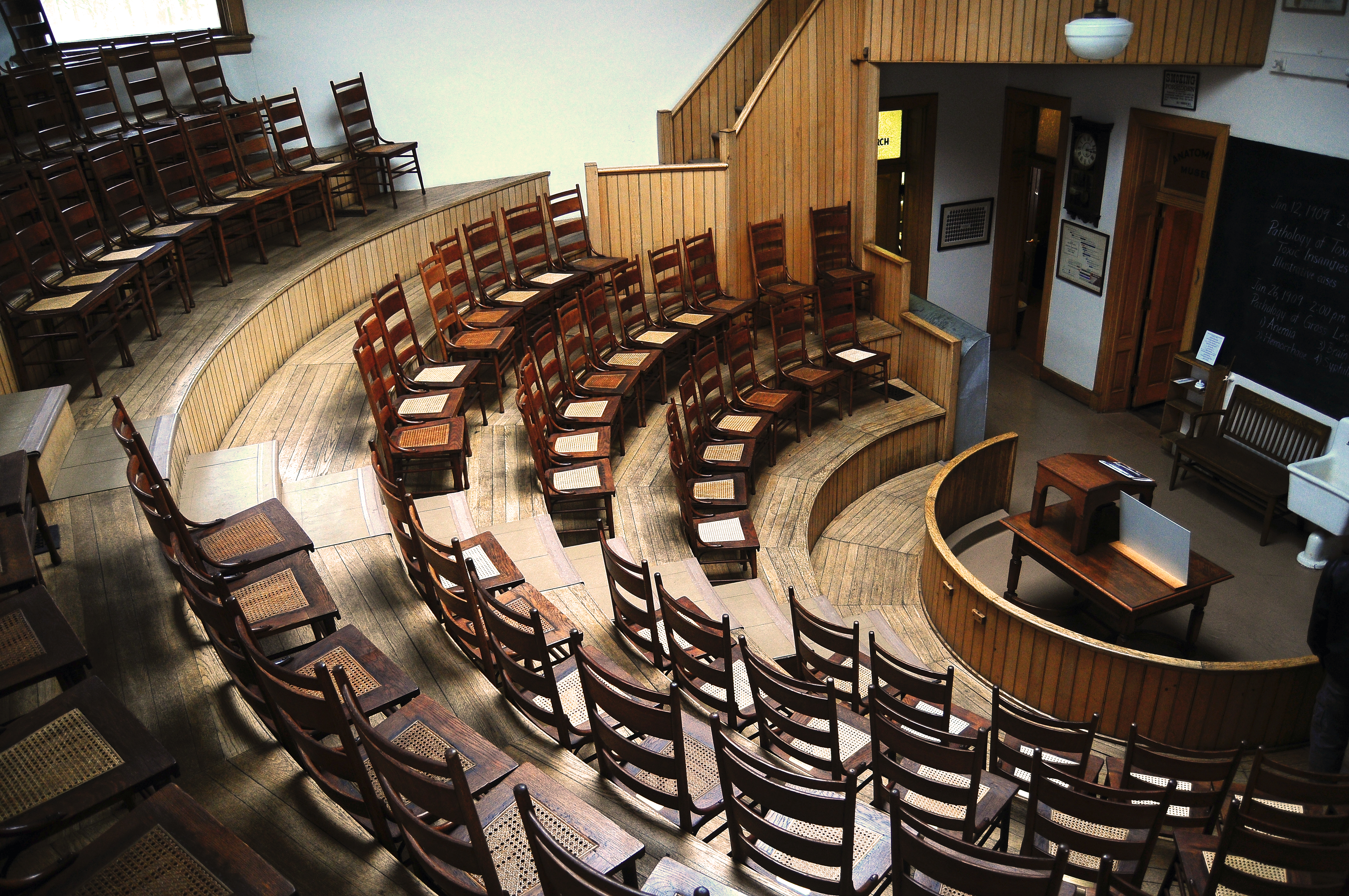
An alternative view of the amphitheater.

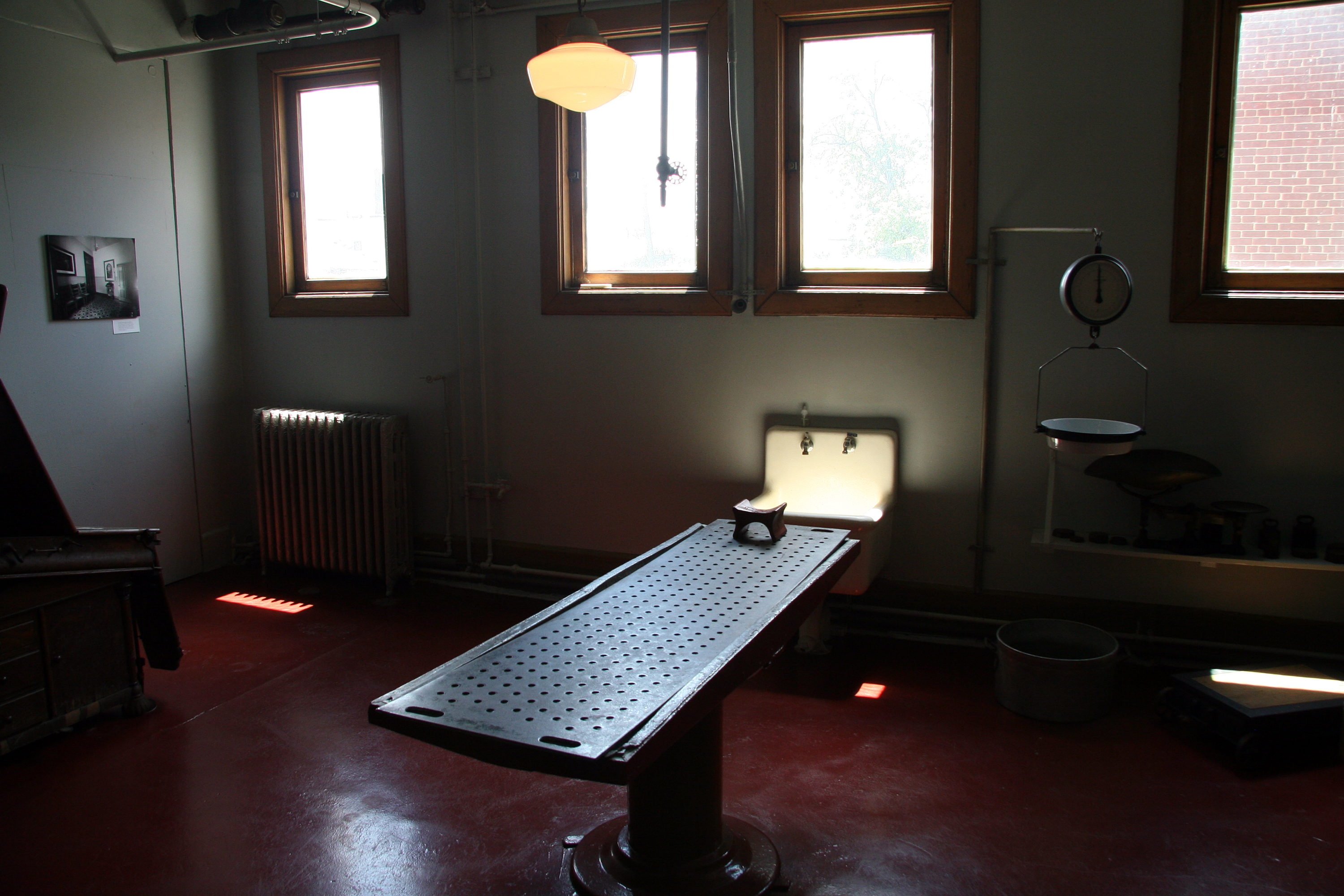
The building's autopsy room.

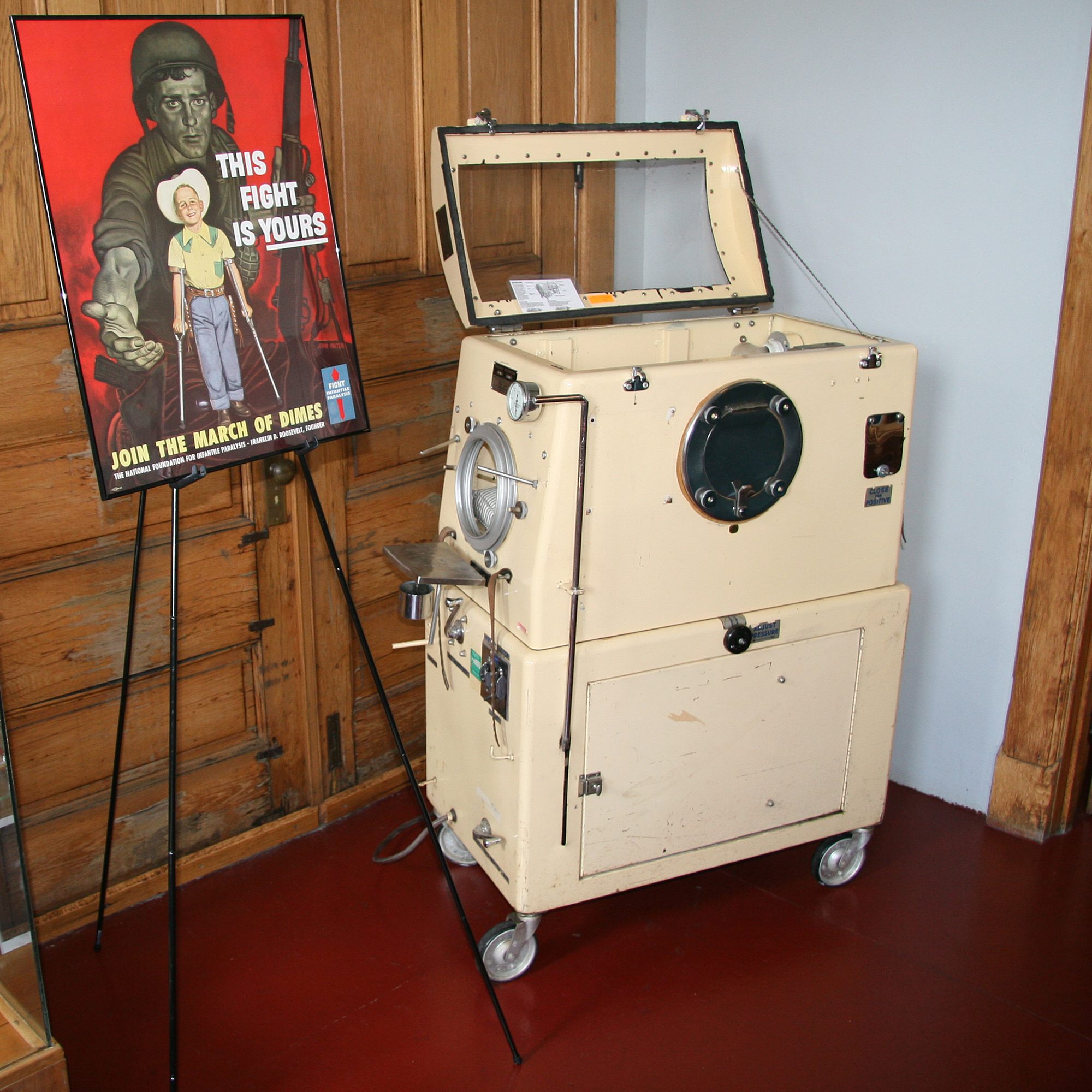
A pediatric iron lung. This artifact is not original to the hospital.

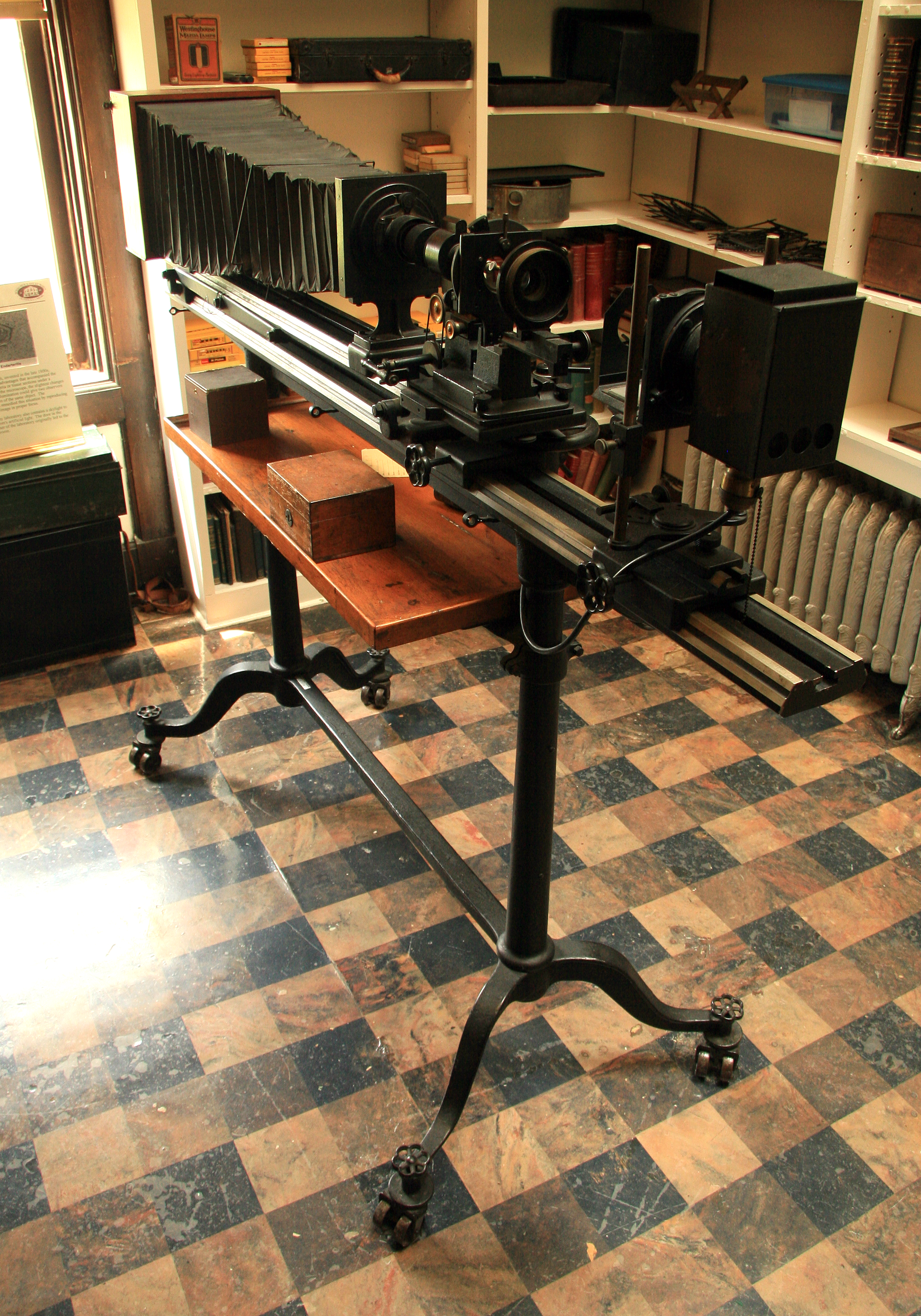
A camera used for enlarging microscope slides in the photography room.

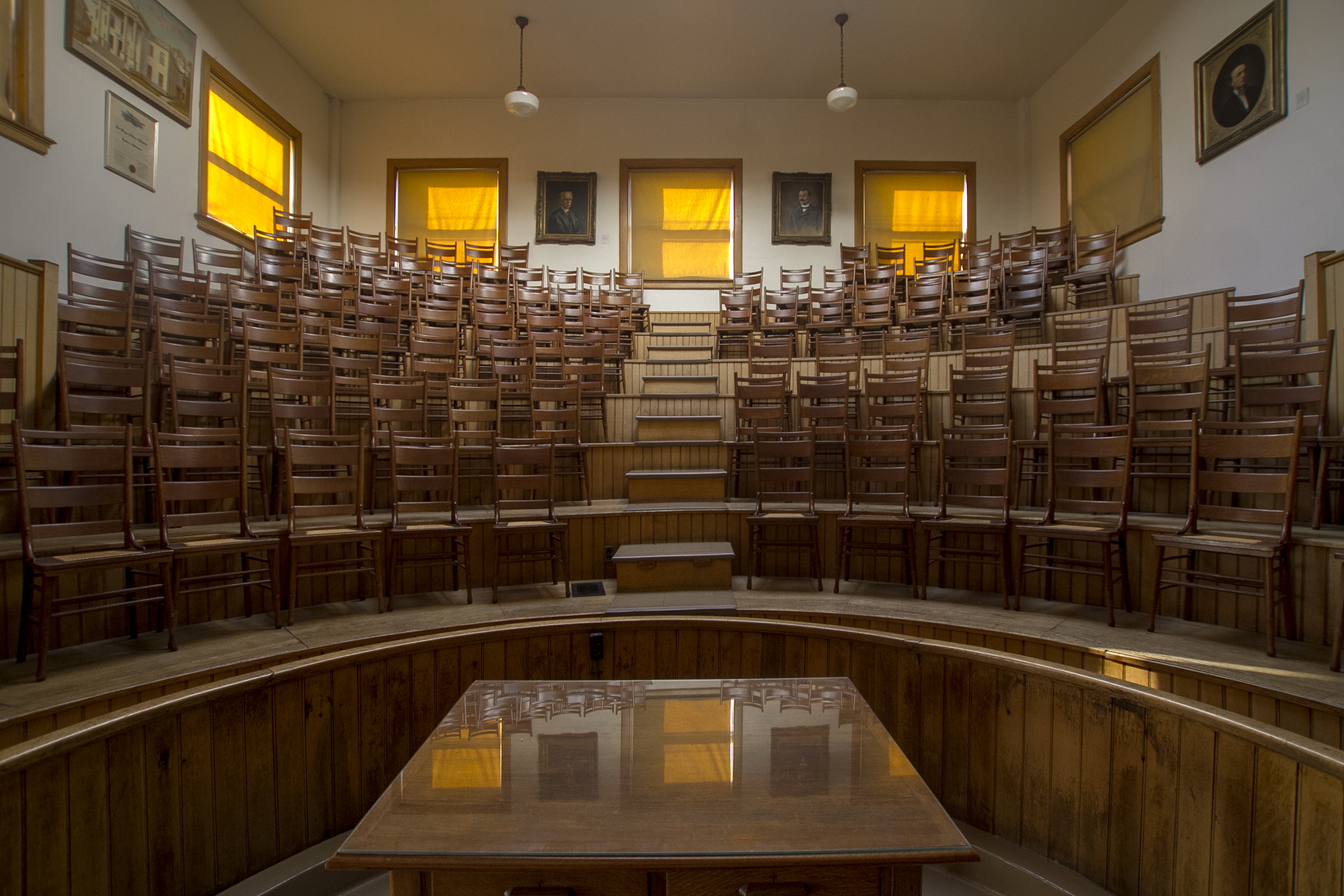
Teaching amphitheater.

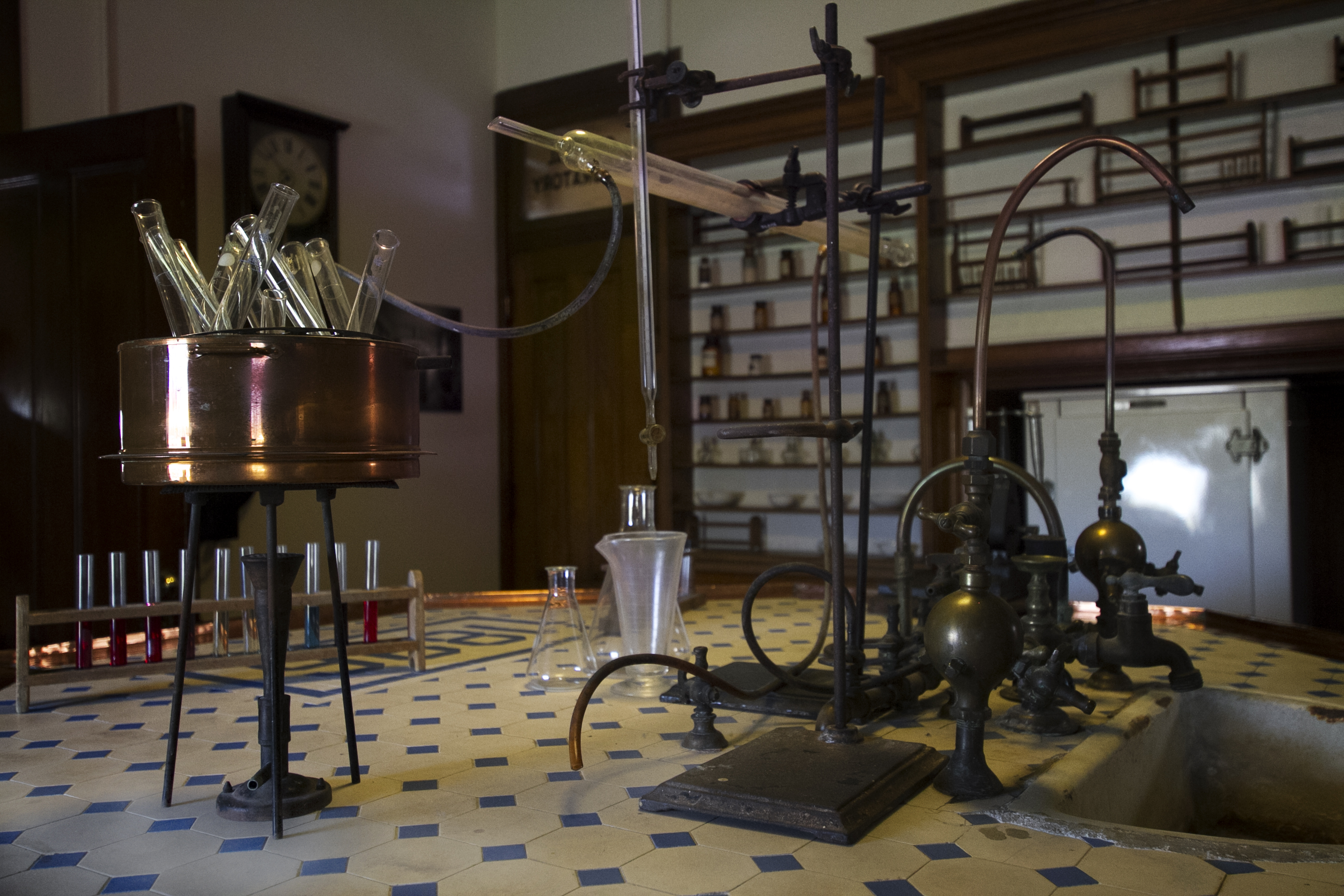
Chemical laboratory.

== See also ==
- List of medical museums
- List of attractions and events in Indianapolis
- National Register of Historic Places listings in Marion County, Indiana
