= Indianapolis Maennerchor =

German-American social club in Indianapolis, Indiana, United States

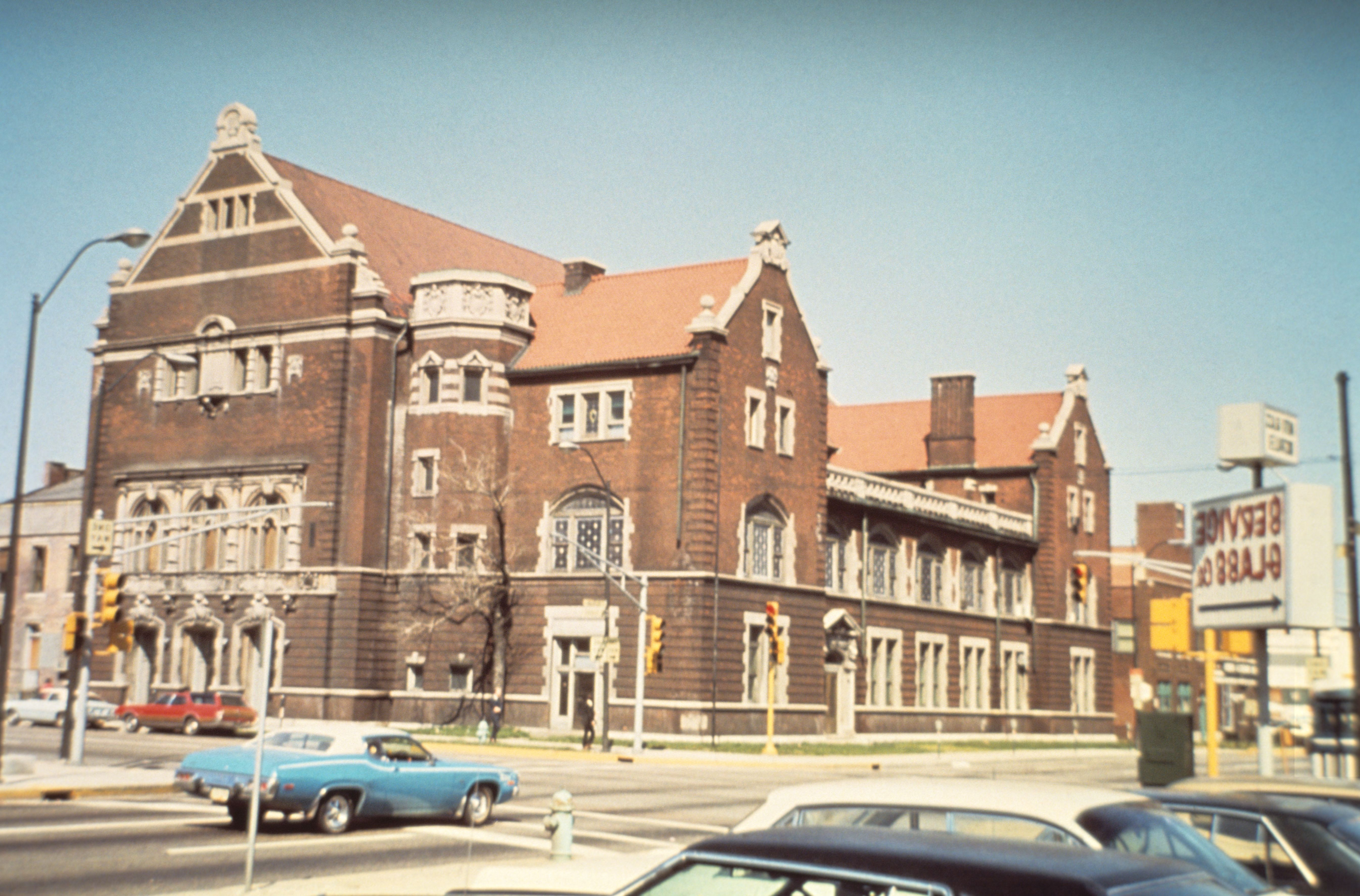
- Maennerchor Building before demolition

General information
- Location: Indianapolis, Indiana, U.S.
- Groundbreaking: 1906
- Demolished: October 1974

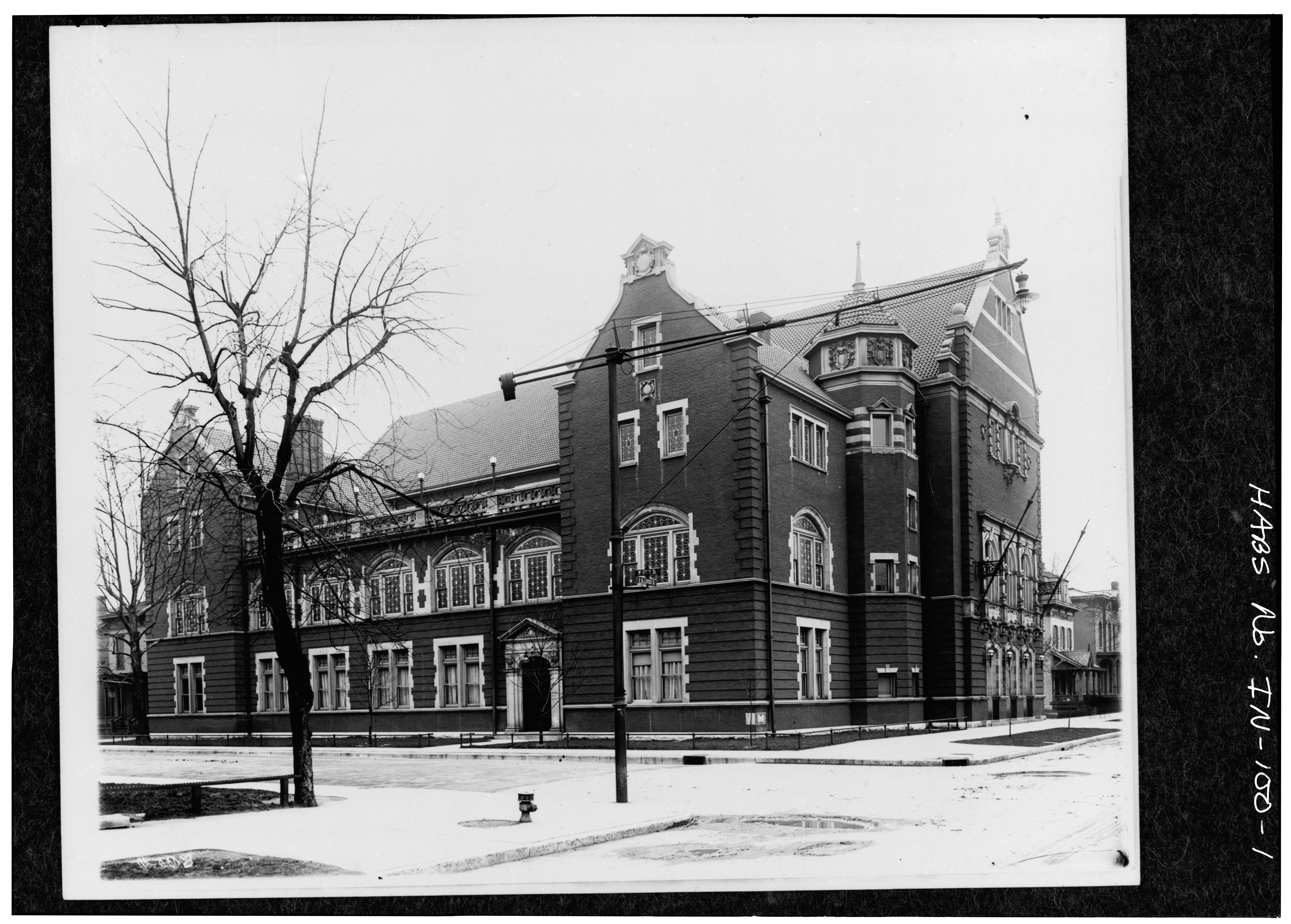
The Maennechor Building in Indianapolis in the mid-20th-century. The building has since been demolished. A parking garage stands at the former site of the club.

The Indianapolis Maennerchor was an organization in Indianapolis, Indiana, United States, that was founded by German immigrants in 1854. Adolf Scherrer designed the group's Maennerchor Hall. Similar Maennerchor clubs were founded in other cities in the United States.

== History ==
Eduard Longerich, Gottfried and Herbert Lecker, and A. Schnellschmidt were among a group of Germans who immigrated to Indianapolis in 1848. Living together in an apartment at 75 E. Washington Street, they started singing German songs. Their first public performance was on May 28, 1855, at the Washington Hall. As their popularity and membership grew, they rented the old City Hall at 337 E. Washington Street. Presidents of the group in the 1800s included Charles R. Emmerich and Carl Bernhard Lizius.

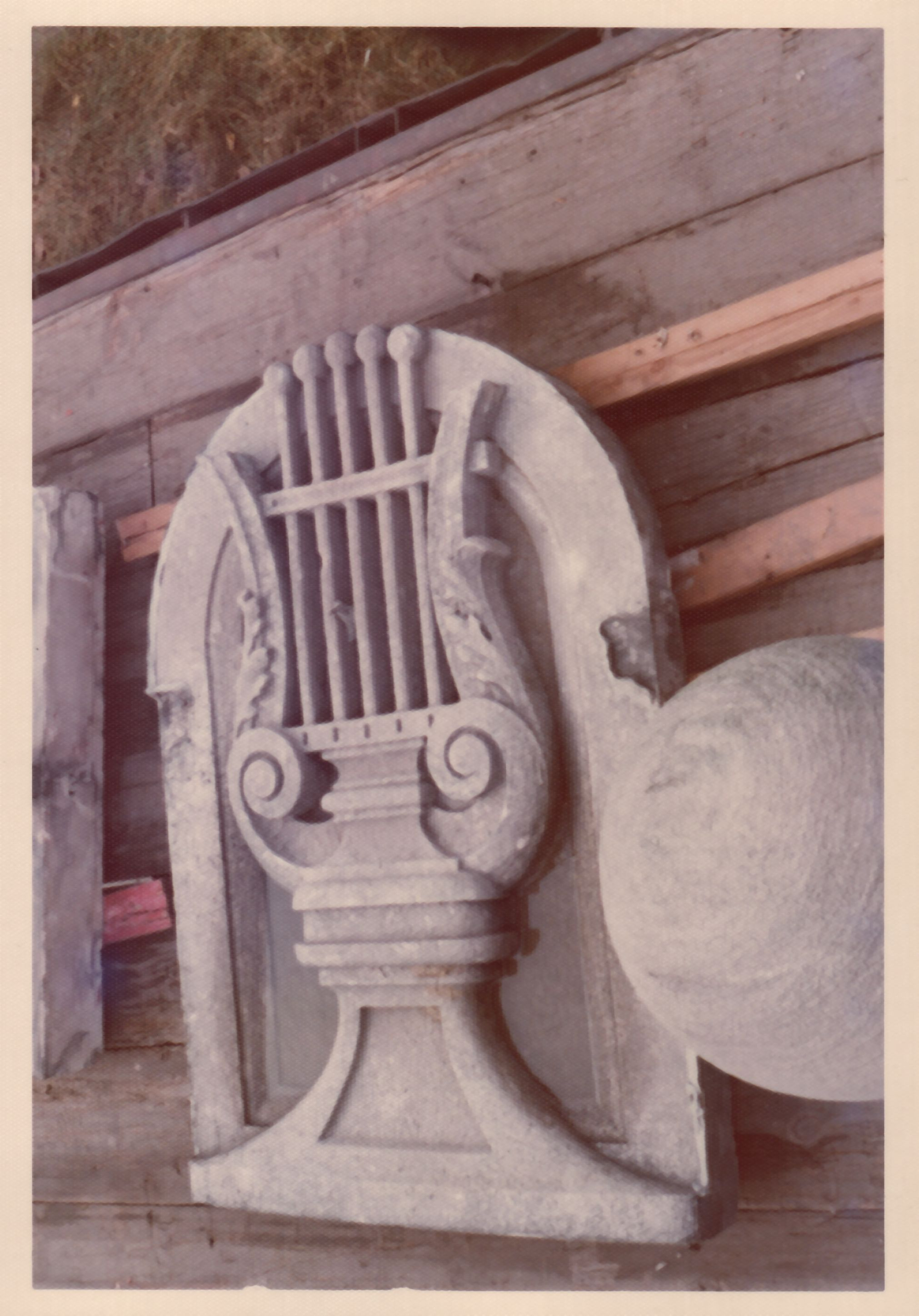
Building Ornamentation from Maennerchor, 502 North Illinois Street (Indianapolis, Ind.)

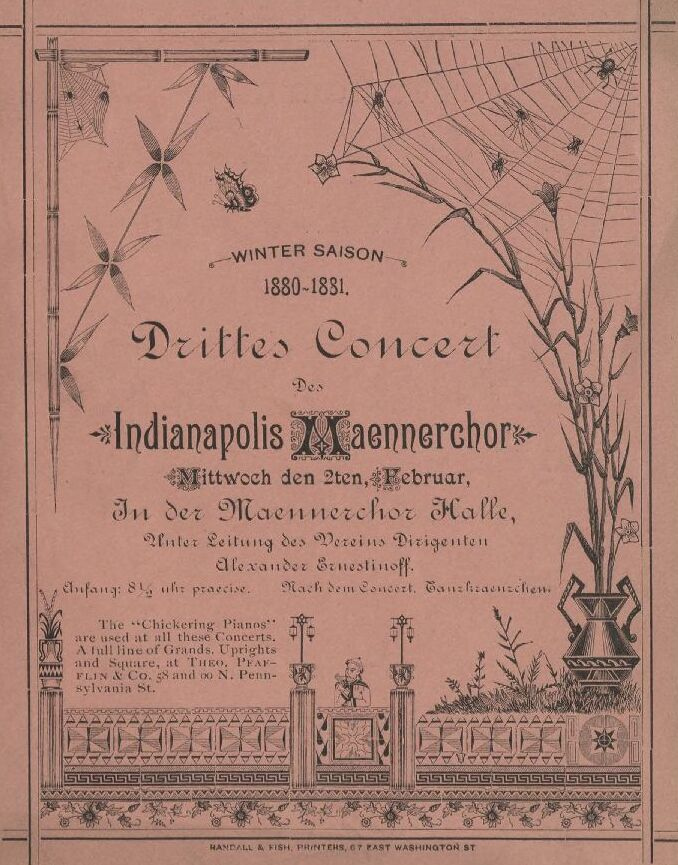
February 2nd, 1881, Evening concert at Old City Hall (337 E. Washington St.)

In 1906, the group laid the cornerstone for the Maennerchor Hall at the corner of Illinois and Michigan streets. However, during World War I, they renamed the building the Academy of Music in response to the anti-German sentiment.

For many years the Maennerchor was sponsored by John P. Frenzel, president of the city's Merchants National Bank. However, upon his death in 1933, the group lost their financial backing and were forced to leave their building and take up residence in the Athenæum.

The Meannerchor's membership reached a high of 125 in the 1950s, but then declined due to changes in public tastes in entertainment. By 2018, the group had only 16 members, six of whom were in their eighties. On February 8 of that year, they announced that the final concert would be held on April 14, with their final performance at Victory Field on May 30. It was the oldest continuously existing male chorus in the United States.

The building was demolished in October 1974 after efforts to restore and preserve it failed.
