= Independent Turnverein =

- U.S. National Register of Historic Places
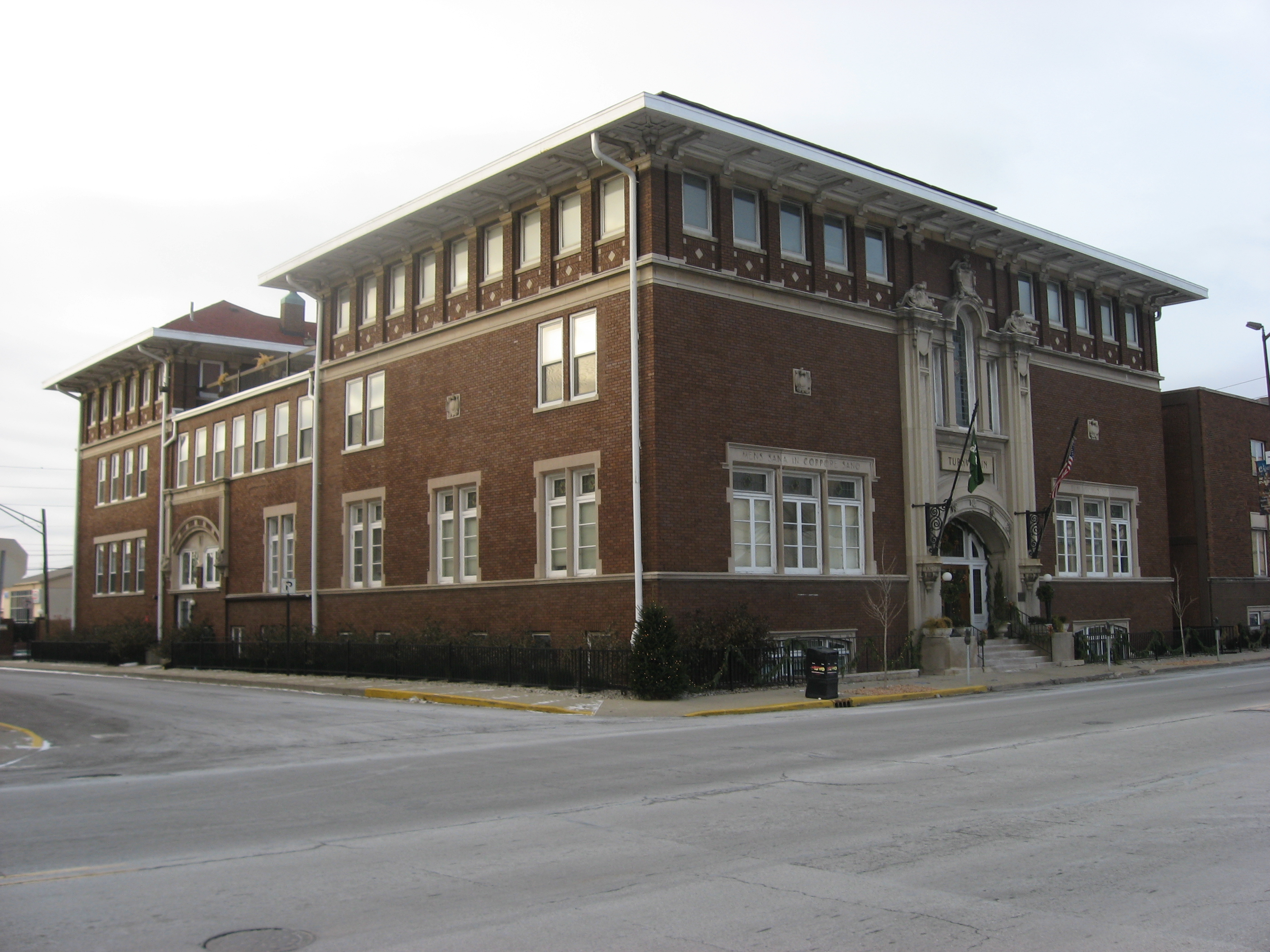
- Independent Turnverein, January 2010

- Location within Indianapolis Location within Indiana Location within the United States
- Location: 902 N. Meridian St., Indianapolis, Indiana
- Coordinates: 39°46′45″N 86°9′28″W
- Area: 1.1 acres (0.45 ha)
- Built: 1913-1914, 1946
- Architect: Adolf Scherrer; Scholer, Walter
- Architectural style: Mixed (more Than 2 Styles From Different Periods)
- NRHP reference No.: 83003577
- Added to NRHP: December 22, 1983

Independent Turnverein, also known as the Hoosier Athletic Club and Marott Building, is a historic Turnverein clubhouse located at Indianapolis, Indiana. It was built in 1907 and consists of a main three-story brick pavilion connected by a two-story section to a second three-story brick pavilion. It has Prairie School and American Craftsman design elements, including a red tile hipped roof. It features paneled and decorated pilasters, a second floor Palladian window, and limestone decorative elements. The building was remodeled in 1946.

It was listed on the National Register of Historic Places in 1983.

== History ==
The Turnverein, located at 902 North Meridian, was built in 1907 when it was built by the Hoosier Athletic Club. The athletic club struggled with financial difficulties during the 1920s and went bankrupt in 1930, leaving the building vacant. The building remained vacant from 1930 to 1943 when it was eventually purchased by Indianapolis businessman George Marott.

The building was renamed the Marott Building and served as an academic space for Purdue University classes. Following extensive renovations, engineering classes began being held in the new Marott Building in 1946. Some of the renovations include the basement was converted from a swimming pool to a chemistry laboratory. Purdue University moved from the building in 1961 to the Krannert Building on 38th street and Indiana University moved into the building in 1965. The IU Speech Department and Theatre program occupied the building until 1971. When the Robert E. Cavanaugh Hall was completed in 1971, most of the speech department moved to the new building apart from the theatre program. When IUPUI formed in 1969, the basement chemistry laboratory was converted into the University Theatre.

In 1972, the School of Education established offices in the Marott Building. In 1980, the University Theatre moved from the Marott to the Mary E. Cable Building on the IUPUI Campus. In 1982, the School of Education moved to the new Education/Social Work Building on the IUPUI main campus. In 1983, the building was converted into the Turnverein Apartment Complex.

== See also ==
- National Register of Historic Places listings in Center Township, Marion County, Indiana
