= Rink's Womens Apparel Store =

- U.S. National Register of Historic Places
- U.S. Historic district – Contributing property
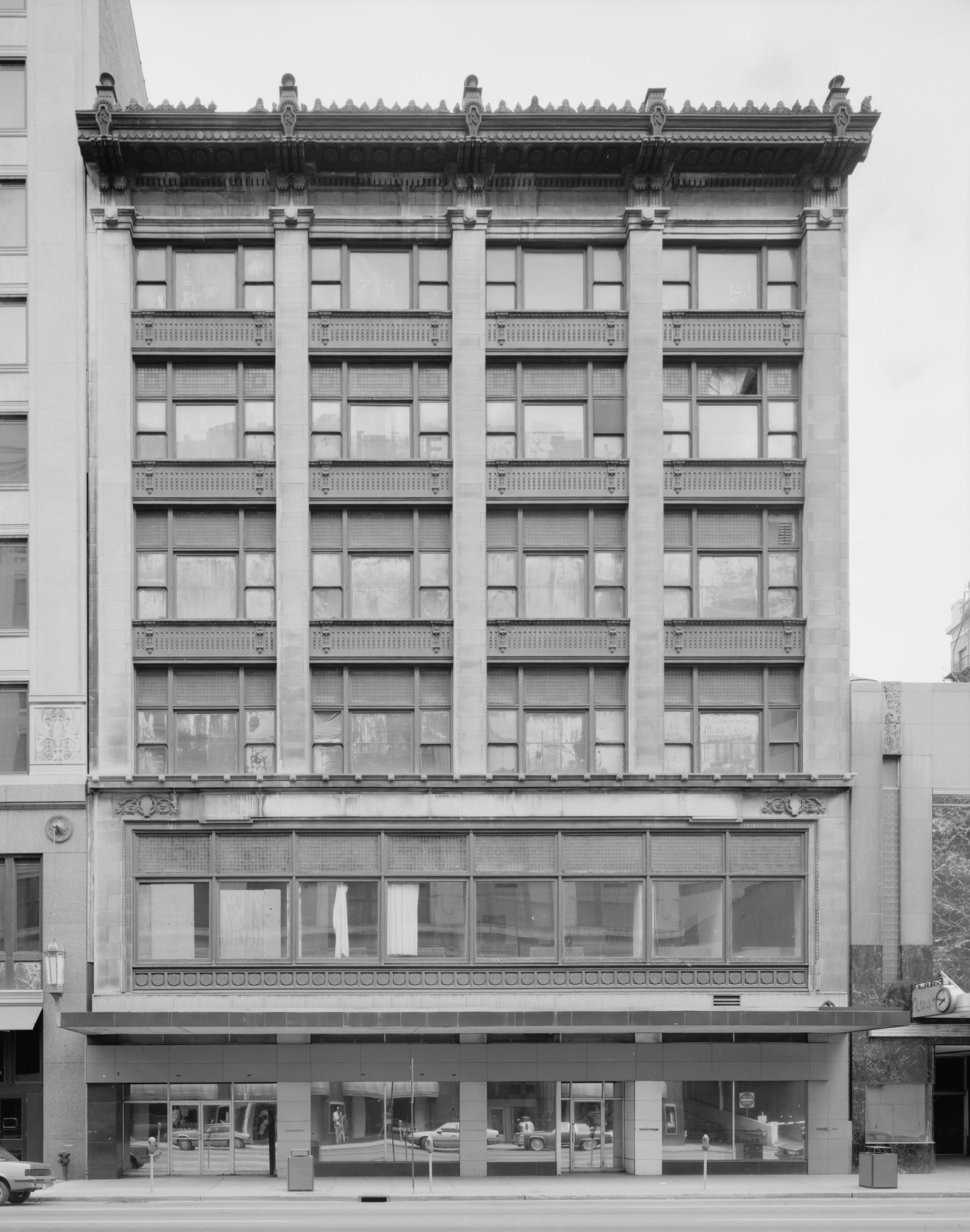
- Rink's Womens Apparel Store, HABS Photo

- Location within Indianapolis Location within Indianapolis Location within Indiana Location within the United States
- Location: 29 N. Illinois St., Indianapolis, Indiana
- Coordinates: 39°46′4″N 86°9′34″W
- Area: less than one acre
- Built: 1910
- Architect: Adolf Scherrer
- Architectural style: Chicago
- NRHP reference No.: 84001188
- Added to NRHP: September 27, 1984

Rink's Womens Apparel Store, also known as the Rink Building, is a historic commercial building located at Indianapolis, Indiana. It was built in 1910, and is a six-story, rectangular, steel frame building sheathed in clay tile and masonry. It measures approximately 120 feet by 70 feet and is four bays wide by seven long. It features large Chicago style window openings. The building housed the Rink's Womens Apparel Store, in operation until 1939.

It was listed on the National Register of Historic Places in 1984. It is located in the Washington Street-Monument Circle Historic District.

== See also ==
- National Register of Historic Places listings in Center Township, Marion County, Indiana
