= Central State Hospital (Indiana) =

Former psychiatric hospital in Indianapolis, Indiana, US

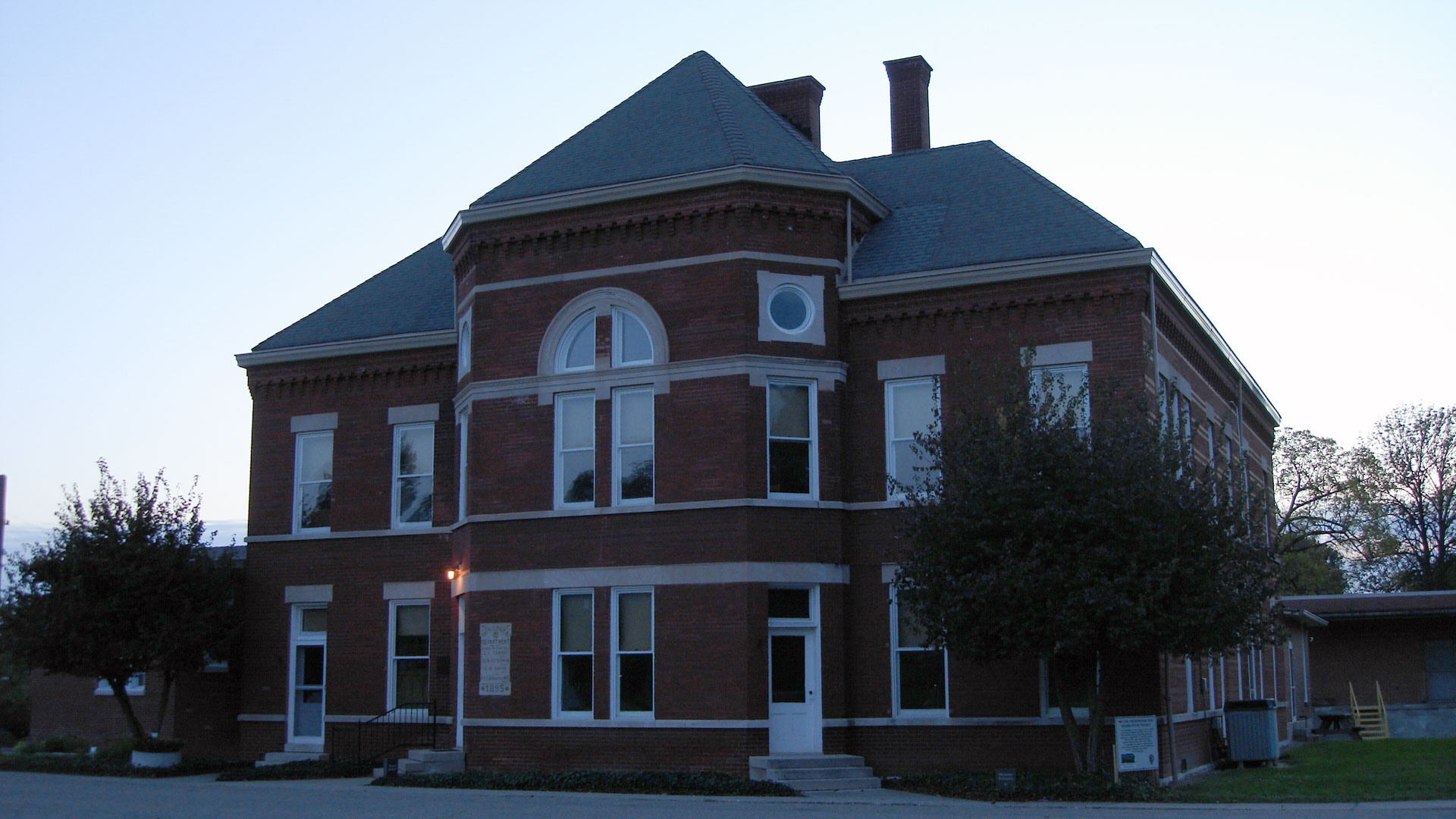

Geography
- Location: 2800–3300 blocks of West Washington Street; Indianapolis, Indiana, United States
- Coordinates: 39.7693°N 86.2112°W

Organization
- Type: Specialist

Services
- Beds: 2500
- Speciality: Psychiatric hospital

History
- Opened: 1848
- Closed: 1994

Links
- Website: Indiana Medical History Museum
- Lists: Hospitals in the United States

Central State Hospital, formerly referred to as the Central Indiana Hospital for the Insane, was a psychiatric treatment hospital in Indianapolis, Indiana, United States. The hospital was established in 1848 to treat patients from anywhere in the state, but by 1905, with the establishment of psychiatric hospitals in other parts of Indiana, Central State served only the counties in the middle of the state. In 1950, it had 2,500 patients. Allegations of abuse, funding shortfalls, and the move to less institutional methods of treatment led to its closure in 1994. Since then efforts have been made to redevelop the site for various uses.

== History ==
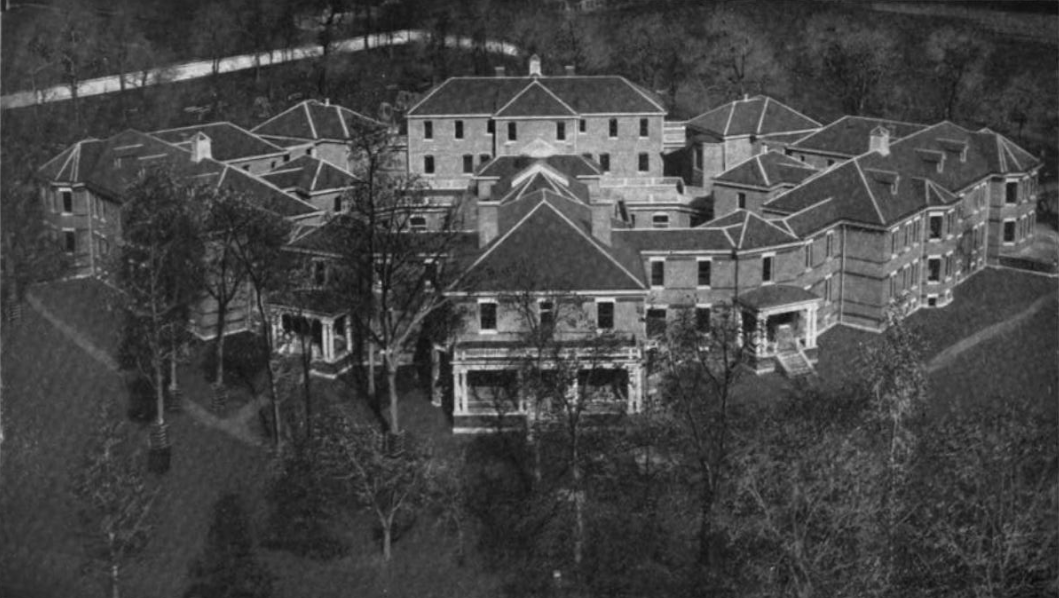
Central Indiana Hospital for the Insane, c. 1903

The Indiana legislature authorized the establishment of a "hospital for the insane" as early as 1827, but the actual construction of a facility was delayed for several years. The Indiana Hospital for the Insane finally opened in November 1848 with a total of five patients. At that time, the hospital consisted of one brick building situated on a large parcel of land of over 100 acres (0.40 km^{2}) on Washington Street, west of downtown Indianapolis. In 1889, the hospital was renamed the Central Indiana Hospital for the Insane. After 1926 it was known as Central State Hospital, and by 1928, physicians cared for nearly 2,500 patients.

From 1848 to 1948, the hospital grew yearly until it encompassed two massive ornate buildings (one for male and one for female patients); a pathological department (which now hosts the Indiana Medical History Museum); a hospital for the "sick insane" for the treatment of physical ailments; a farm colony where patients engaged in "occupational therapy"; a chapel; an amusement hall complete with an auditorium, billiards, and bowling alleys; a bakery; a firehouse; a cannery staffed by patients; and idyllic gardens and fountains.

The more ornate of the two massive buildings became known as "Seven Steeples". This building, which housed female patients, was designed using the Kirkbride Plan for mental healthcare facilities.

For a half-century, these complex buildings and gardens housed mentally ill patients from all regions of Indiana. By 1905, however, the state had built mental health institutions in Evansville, Logansport, Madison, and Richmond, thereby relieving an overcrowded Central State Hospital of some of its patient load and leaving it to treat only those from the "central district", an area of 38 counties situated in the middle portion of the state. In 1950 the patient population reached 2,500; its largest capacity.

By the early 1970s, most of the hospital's ostentatious buildings had been declared unsound and razed. The Men's Department Building (not a Kirkbride design, but instead known as Straight Block, although it had the same goal of providing patients with access to a window for sunlight and fresh air) had already been demolished over 12 years ending in 1941. In their place, the state constructed brick buildings of a nondescript, institutional genre. These modern buildings and the medical staff therein continued to serve the state's mentally ill until allegations of patient abuse and funding troubles sparked an effort to forge new alternatives to institutionalization, which, in turn, led to the hospital's closure in 1994.

== Notable people ==
=== Superintendents ===
- James Athon – superintendent in 1857 when patients were sent home due to a lack of funding
- William Baldwin Fletcher (1837–1907) – superintendent from 1883 to 1887, when he was fired; known for destroying mechanical restraints in an 1885 bonfire and opposing staff appointments influenced by politics
- George F. Edenharter (1857–1923) – superintendent from 1893 to 1923; involved in the establishment of a pathology building; which currently houses the Indiana Medical History Museum, which opened in 1896
- Max A. Bahr (1872–1953) – superintendent from 1923 to 1952; trained as a clinical psychiatrist and known for his work in forensic psychiatry and the treatment of neurosyphilis

=== Other staff ===
- Sarah Stockton (1842–1924) – graduated from the Woman's Medical College of Pennsylvania; hired in 1884 as the first female physician at the hospital, specifically in the department for women
- Walter Bruetsch (1896–1977) – educated in Switzerland and Germany; hired in the 1920s to be the chief pathologist of the Pathological Department

=== Patients ===
- Anna Agnew – published a biography, Under the Cloud: Or, Personal Reminiscences of Insanity, in 1886 to discuss the treatment she experienced during her seven years at the hospital
- Riah Fagan Cox (1892–1977) – wrote a short story, "I Remember Jones", in 1950 about the treatment she experienced at the hospital in the 1940s; her daughter, Jane Cox, was Kurt Vonnegut's first wife
- Robert Dale Owen - U.S. Representative who received care at the hospital for 3 months after a mental breakdown in 1875.
- Albert Thayer – Civil war veteran who published exposés about the poor treatment of patients at the hospital after being discharged in 1884
- John Zwara (1880–1951) – trained as an artist in Prague and Berlin; created watercolor paintings of the hospital as a patient in 1936; admitted to the hospital by Alexander Vonnegut, the son of Bernard Vonnegut I

== Current status ==
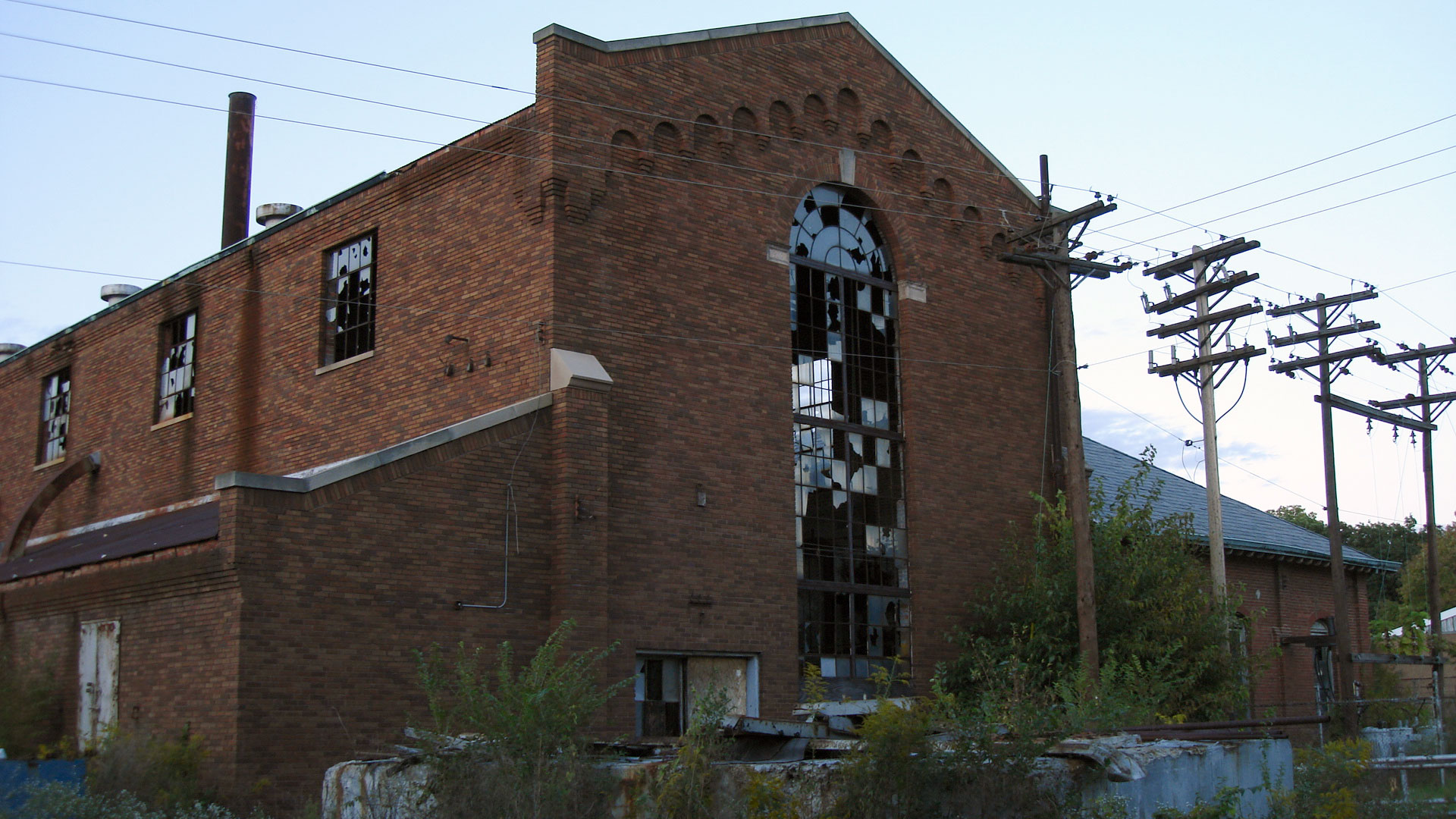
The 1886 Power Plant

The grounds of Central State Hospital were still largely vacant as of 2011. In place of the demolished Women's Ward (Seven Steeples) is a large lawn. There are approximately ten buildings on the grounds that were associated with the hospital. The Pathology Department building, built in 1895, is well preserved and houses the Indiana Medical History Museum. The three more modern wards (Evans, Bolton, and Bahr) were built in 1974 when the others were demolished. The oldest building on the property is the old power house, built in 1886. The Administration building, which was built in 1938, is now the structure most commonly associated with the hospital, although it never housed patients. In 2005, the Beckmann Theatre was granted temporary occupancy of the 1895 Laundry Building for staging its production of Asylum. More recently, the building was used for storing cars.

The Indiana State Archives, the Indiana State Library, and the Indiana Medical History Museum are preserving the history of an institution that served the mentally ill of Indiana for 146 years.

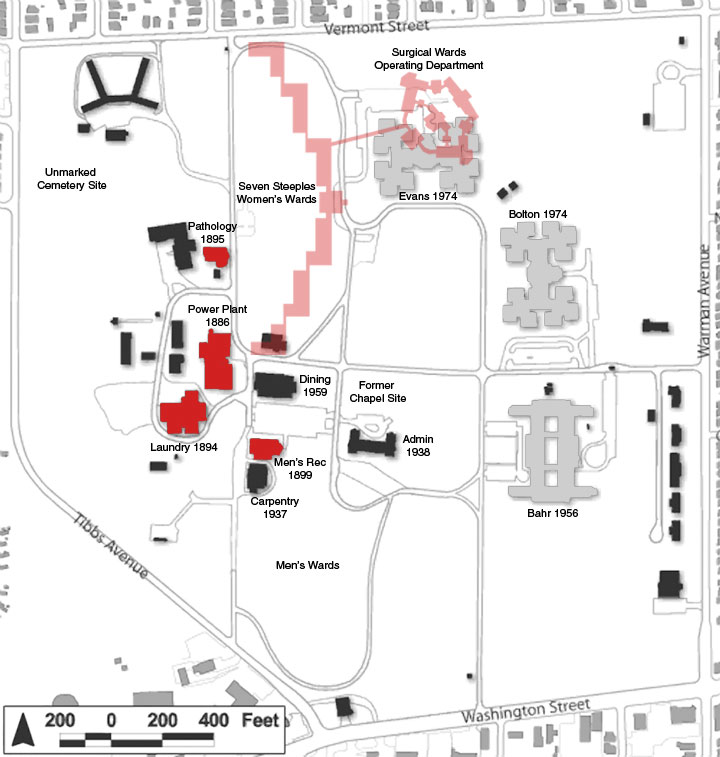
Map showing the buildings on the grounds of Central State

In March 2003, the city of Indianapolis purchased the property from the state for $400,000. The land that was acquired consists of 160 acres (0.65 km^{2}) located on the city's westside at the 2800-3300 blocks of West Washington Street.

In December 2006, the city approved the sale the Central State Hospital site to a developer for just over $2 million. The developer began further negotiations with the city to determine the future uses, including apartments, shops, and green space. About six months later the developers sought to buy another 33 acres (130,000 m^{2}) from the city, at a cost of $223,500.

In late 2013, several buildings, including the former Administrative Building as well as the prominent Powerhouse, were purchased by a company known for refurbishing buildings otherwise left to waste. The project to turn the administrative building into student apartments began in January 2014, with some students moving in by September 2014 as construction continued. The building is now named Central State Mansion and retains original features of the architecture as well as decorations suggestive of its history.

The site is the subject of the 2006 film Central State: Asylum for the Insane, a documentary produced and directed by independent filmmaker Dan T. Hall of Vizmo Films.

As of December 2022, only three of the original structures remain: the 1886 power plant, the 1895 pathology building, and a building of unidentified use.

== See also ==
- List of hospitals in Indianapolis § Defunct
