= Tipton County Jail and Sheriff's Home =

Historic government buildings in Indiana, United States

- U.S. National Register of Historic Places
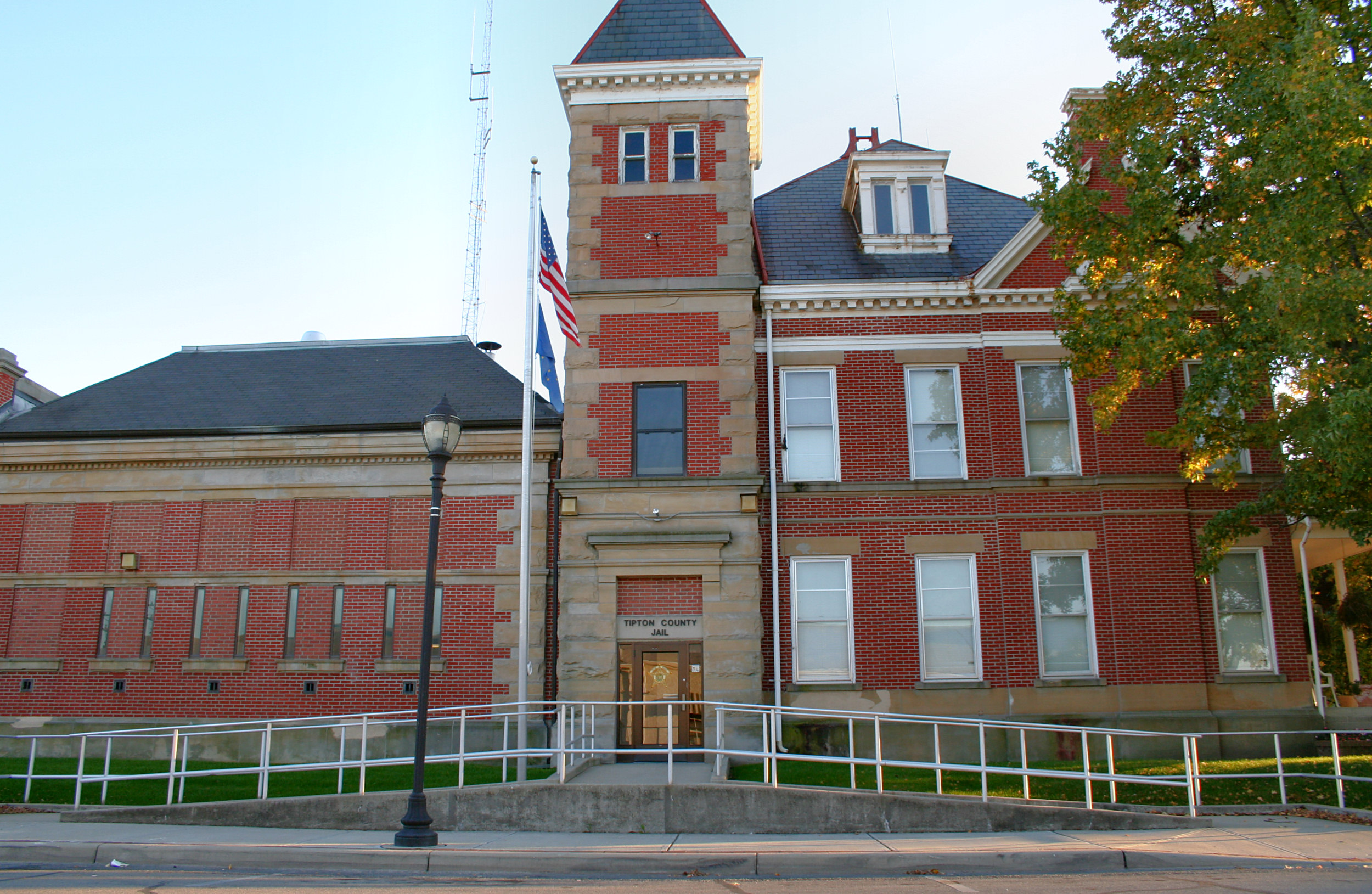
- Tipton County Jail and Sheriff's Home, October 2005

- Location within Indiana Location within the United States
- Location: 203 S. West St., Tipton, Indiana
- Coordinates: 40°16′50″N 86°2′34″W
- Area: less than one acre
- Built: 1894-1895
- Built by: Pearce & Morgan
- Architect: Adolf Scherrer
- NRHP reference No.: 84001667
- Added to NRHP: May 17, 1984

Tipton County Jail and Sheriff's Home is a historic combined jail and sheriff's residence located at Tipton, Indiana. It was designed by Adolf Scherrer who also designed the 1888 Indiana State Capitol and Tipton County Courthouse and built in 1894–1895. It is constructed of red brick with stone trim and consists of a 2 1/2-story residence and two-story jail section. The residence has a hip on gable roof, the jail a hipped roof, and there is a three-story tower located between the two sections.

It was added to the National Register of Historic Places in 1984.
