= Tipton County Courthouse (Tipton, Indiana) =

- U.S. National Register of Historic Places
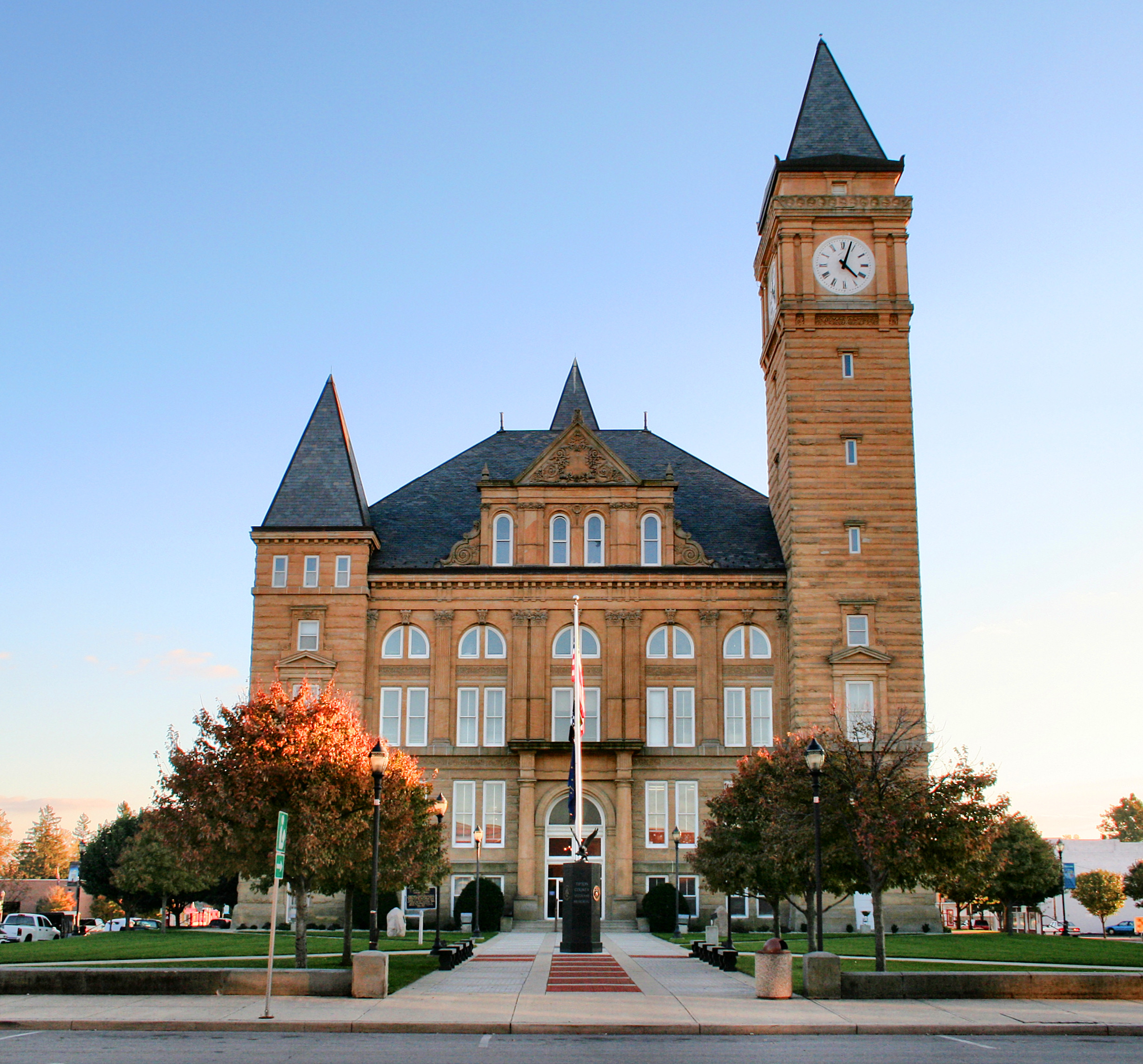
- Tipton County Courthouse in Tipton, Indiana

- Location within Indiana Location within the United States
- Location: Public Sq., Tipton, Indiana
- Coordinates: 40°16′54″N 86°3′9″W
- Area: 2 acres (0.81 ha)
- Built: 1893
- Built by: Pearce & Morgan (builder)
- Architect: Adolf Scherrer
- Architectural style: Romanesque Revival architecture
- NRHP reference No.: 84001665
- Added to NRHP: March 1, 1984

The Tipton County Courthouse is a historic courthouse located at Tipton, Indiana. The courthouse is Tipton's third and was completed in 1894. The courthouse is an example of Romanesque Revival style architecture and was designed by Adolf Scherrer who also designed the 1888 Indiana State Capitol and Tipton County Jail and Sheriff's Home. Sherrer took over the architectural design work for the Indiana Statehouse project from Edwin May who died in 1880. Five years after the completion of the capitol building project in 1888, Scherrer began work on the Tipton County Courthouse building.

It is built of sandstone in a Romanesque Revival style with a clock tower that rises 206 feet above the ground. It is topped by a flagstaff. The building was constructed by Pierce and Morgan of Indianapolis during 1893 and 1894 at a cost of $170,988. (Note: A $171,000 capital expense in 1894 would be roughly equivalent to $39,000,000 in 2010.) It is one of several Romanesque courthouses dating from the 1890s that are still in use.

It was added to the National Register of Historic Places on March 1, 1984.

== See also ==
- National Register of Historic Places listings in Indiana
