= Edwin May (architect) =

American architect (1823–1880)

- Born: July 23, 1823; Boston, Massachusetts
- Died: February 27, 1880 (aged 56)
- Occupation: Architect
- Buildings: Indiana State House

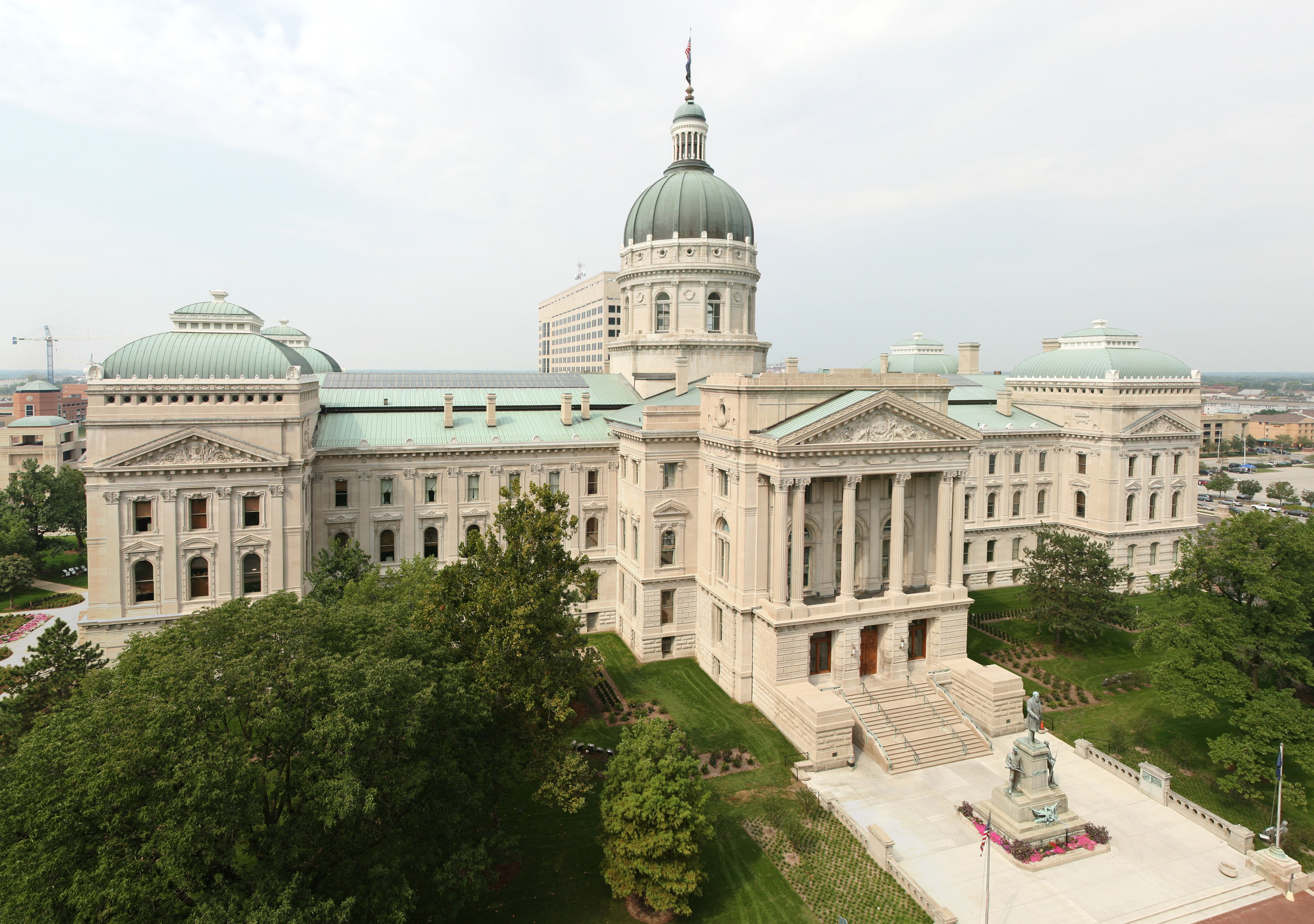
The Indiana Statehouse

Edwin May (1823–1880) was an American architect based in Indianapolis, Indiana. He designed several county courthouses, the Indiana State House and other public hospital and school buildings, including the Horace Mann Public School No. 13. He also received patents for his fireproofing designs. During the construction of his final project, the Indiana State House, he became paralyzed, traveled to Jacksonville, Florida to recover and died. Adolf Scherrer took over the project.

He was born in Boston, Massachusetts. Louis Henry Gibson worked as a draftsman in his office.

Edwin died on February 27, 1880, at the age of fifty-six. His remains are interred at Crown Hill Cemetery in Indianapolis, Section 25, Lot 191, 39.8183405°N 86.1702987°W.
