= Tipton, Indiana =

- City
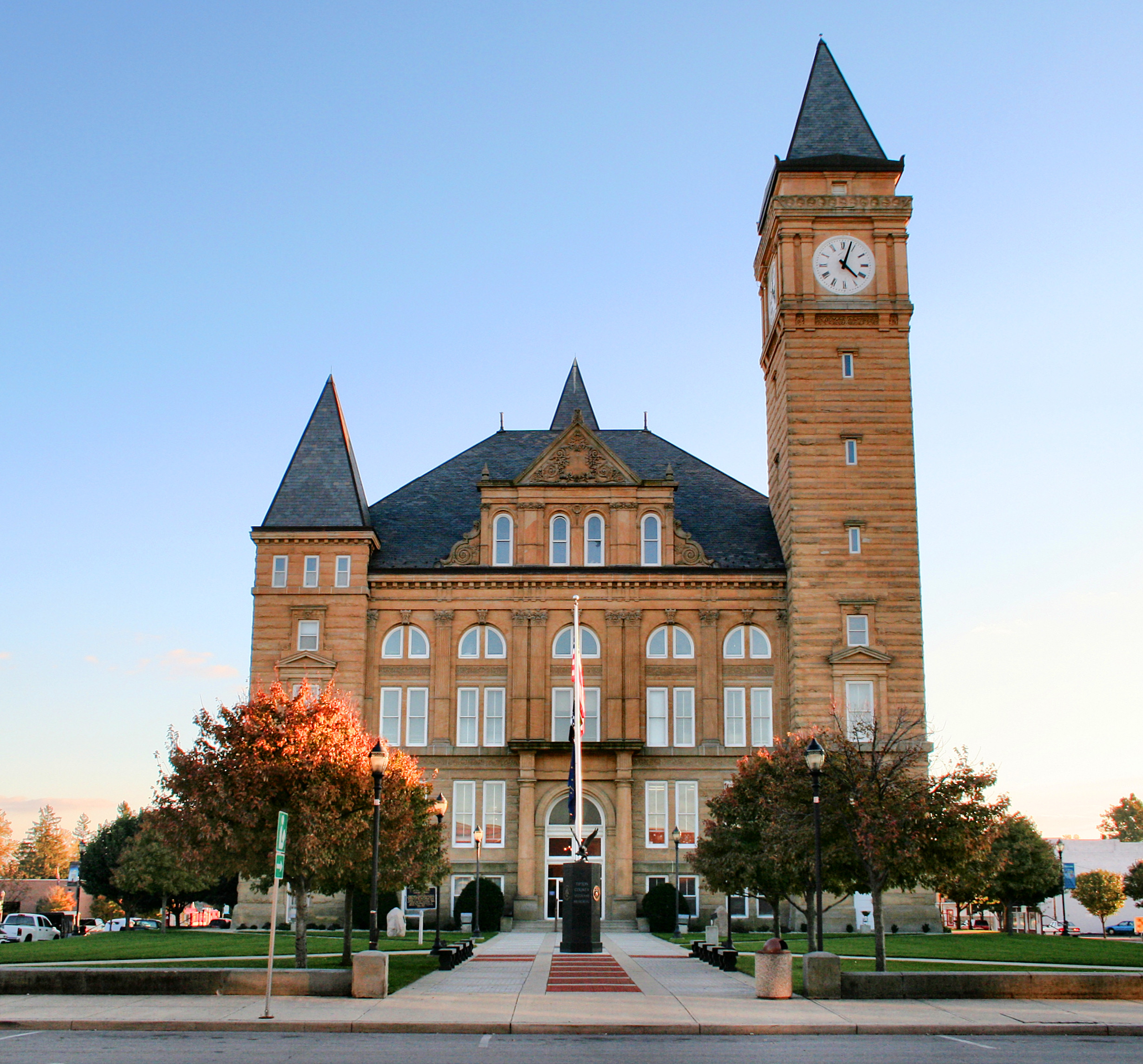
- Tipton County Courthouse in Tipton

- Flag

- Location of Tipton in Tipton County, Indiana.
- Coordinates: 40°16′55″N 86°02′32″W
- Country: United States
- State: Indiana
- County: Tipton
- Township: Cicero
- Platted: April 16, 1839

Government
  - Mayor: Kegan Schmicker (R)

Area
  - Total: 2.63 sq mi (6.80 km^{2})
  - Land: 2.63 sq mi (6.80 km^{2})
  - Water: 0 sq mi (0.00 km^{2}) 0%
- Elevation: 869 ft (265 m)

Population (2020)
  - Total: 5,275
  - Density: 2,009.3/sq mi (775.79/km^{2})
- Time zone: UTC-5 (EST)
  - Summer (DST): UTC-4 (EDT)
- ZIP code: 46072
- Area code: 765
- FIPS code: 18-75986
- GNIS feature ID: 2397028
- Website: www.tiptongov.com

Tipton is a city in and the county seat of Tipton County, Indiana, United States. The population was estimated to be 5,275 as of July 1, 2021. Tipton is approximately 19 miles southeast of Kokomo, Indiana and approximately 42 miles north of Indianapolis, Indiana.

== History ==
The Tipton County Courthouse and Tipton County Jail and Sheriff's Home were added to the National Register of Historic Places in 1984.

=== Samuel King founds Kingston ===
The first non-native person to settle in the area now known as Tipton was Samuel King, who purchased land between 1835 and 1836. The land was still a part of Hamilton County. He resided in Rush County, but visited the area frequently. Strawtown, Indiana, was the closest trading post. King decided to found a town on the land he purchased and he platted the town on April 16, 1839. The town was named Kingston. Despite efforts, King failed to sell any of the plots that he platted. A few Miami Indians resided in the area still.

In January, 1844, Tipton County was founded and a county seat needed to be created. The county seat was originally going to be located in the middle area of the county, however, Miami Indians resided on the land and they were unable to create a town there. The county commissioners put out a call for landowners to propose that the county seat be placed on their land. King offered to donate 100 acres of Kingston. On October 16, 1844, the commissioners accepted his offer.

=== Canton ===
The commissioners were in charge of also naming the new town. Commissioner John D. Smith, who used to reside in Ohio, proposed to name the town Canton, after Canton, Ohio. The commission accepted the name. After October, it was decided to plat Canton. The area had to be cleared of trees and plants, and John Criswell did the surveying for $2 a day. Sales of the plots began in November. As of March 1845, 34 lots had been sold.

=== Canton becomes Tipton ===
In 1845, a post office was going to be established in Canton. However, this did not proceed because it was discovered that there was a town already named Canton in the state, which was founded in 1838. The town was renamed Tipton, after John Tipton, a veteran of the Battle of Tippecanoe and the War of 1812. He was also the leader of the Indiana Rangers. Tipton served as United States Senator for Indiana from 1831 until shortly before his death in 1839. Finally, a post office was founded and John S. Ressler became the first postmaster.

Early Tipton was unorganized, with log cabins and poorly built homes riddling the streets and not following the platting. Cows wandered through town and wild game was chased by residents through the streets. It was very rural. There was no telegraph or steam train, so communication with areas outside of the area were rare during this time. Residents lived mainly on hunting. Agriculture was poorly developed. Tipton was also known for flooding and mud, with people having to frequently walk through flood waters and swamp-like areas to get from house to house during wet seasons. By 1850, the population doubled and a physician, Isaac Parker, had founded his practice in the city.

=== Cholera epidemic ===
Around August 1, 1845, the city entered into a cholera epidemic. The majority of residents fled the city. Livestock began dying of starvation and dehydration due to being left in their pens due to their owners deaths or fleeing of the city. One resident, Mason Lyons, freed all the animals that were still alive, allowing them to wander into the forest to feed. Stores and businesses closed. There were three doctors in town, including Isaac Parker. Over 20 people died. The epidemic lasted approximately one month.

=== Late 1800s and incorporation ===
In 1854, the Tipton Presbyterian Church was founded in the city, after being dissolved in Normanda. A Christian church was founded in Tipton in 1855. Its congregation met at the Methodist Episcopal church until a church was built in 1870. The congregation built a new church, the West Street Christian church, that was completed in 1908. The court house burnt down in 1857. The Methodist church served as the court house for three years until the new courthouse was finished. In 1872, the Jefferson street canal was built, which helped to drain the surface areas of the town. The canal was nonexistent by 1914. The first Catholic church was built in Tipton in 1874. By 1880, Tipton was primarily low-income and had little to no economy. Saloons were the most profitable businesses. Starting in 1880, the town began to rebuild its reputation. An incentive was offered to whoever built the first brick building. The Methodist church outgrew its building and the new church was the first brick building, starting the trend for two-story brick buildings in the town. Tipton was incorporated in 1884, becoming the "city" of Tipton. The first city election was held in 1884.

In 1888, the Sisters of St. Joseph arrived in Tipton to settle. A small church was built and they founded St. Joseph Academy, a parochial school. The school closed in 1977. A Baptist church was organized in Tipton in 1898, with a church being built in 1900.

== Geography ==
Tipton is located 42 miles (68 km.) almost due North of the state Capital, Indianapolis and 19 miles southwest of Kokomo, Indiana.

According to the 2010 census, Tipton has a total area of 2.5 square miles (6.47 km^{2}), all land.

=== Natural environment ===
In 1849, the city was covered in trees, underbrush, logs, stumps and wild vines and weeds. A large swamp was located on the southeastern part of the town square. On the north side of the square was a slough. Eastern wolves, bull frogs, deer, mosquitos, and wild game were commonplace.

== Climate ==
According to the Köppen Climate Classification system, Tipton has a hot-summer humid continental climate, abbreviated "Dfa" on climate maps. The hottest temperature recorded in Tipton was 103 °F (39.4 °C) on June 29, 2012, while the coldest temperature recorded was −25 °F (−31.7 °C) on January 19–20, 1994.

Climate data for Tipton, Indiana, 1991–2020 normals, extremes 1895–1897, 1971–present
Month	Jan	Feb	Mar	Apr	May	Jun	Jul	Aug	Sep	Oct	Nov	Dec	Year
Record high °F (°C)	69 (21)	74 (23)	85 (29)	86 (30)	96 (36)	103 (39)	100 (38)	100 (38)	98 (37)	93 (34)	81 (27)	71 (22)	103 (39)
Mean maximum °F (°C)	57.0 (13.9)	60.5 (15.8)	71.3 (21.8)	80.0 (26.7)	87.3 (30.7)	92.0 (33.3)	92.3 (33.5)	91.2 (32.9)	90.3 (32.4)	83.0 (28.3)	70.0 (21.1)	59.5 (15.3)	94.2 (34.6)
Mean daily maximum °F (°C)	34.6 (1.4)	38.9 (3.8)	49.7 (9.8)	62.6 (17.0)	73.4 (23.0)	82.1 (27.8)	84.7 (29.3)	83.5 (28.6)	78.5 (25.8)	66.0 (18.9)	51.4 (10.8)	39.6 (4.2)	62.1 (16.7)
Daily mean °F (°C)	25.8 (−3.4)	29.3 (−1.5)	39.1 (3.9)	50.6 (10.3)	61.7 (16.5)	70.8 (21.6)	73.3 (22.9)	71.6 (22.0)	65.5 (18.6)	53.7 (12.1)	41.4 (5.2)	31.3 (−0.4)	51.2 (10.6)
Mean daily minimum °F (°C)	17.0 (−8.3)	19.8 (−6.8)	28.5 (−1.9)	38.6 (3.7)	50.0 (10.0)	59.6 (15.3)	61.9 (16.6)	59.7 (15.4)	52.5 (11.4)	41.4 (5.2)	31.3 (−0.4)	22.9 (−5.1)	40.3 (4.6)
Mean minimum °F (°C)	−5.1 (−20.6)	−0.3 (−17.9)	11.4 (−11.4)	24.6 (−4.1)	34.6 (1.4)	46.3 (7.9)	51.0 (10.6)	49.0 (9.4)	38.8 (3.8)	28.0 (−2.2)	17.0 (−8.3)	3.9 (−15.6)	−8.9 (−22.7)
Record low °F (°C)	−25 (−32)	−18 (−28)	−9 (−23)	11 (−12)	26 (−3)	35 (2)	42 (6)	41 (5)	27 (−3)	18 (−8)	3 (−16)	−22 (−30)	−25 (−32)
Average precipitation inches (mm)	2.81 (71)	2.23 (57)	3.14 (80)	4.36 (111)	4.53 (115)	5.39 (137)	4.34 (110)	3.17 (81)	3.27 (83)	3.07 (78)	3.37 (86)	2.71 (69)	42.39 (1,078)
Average snowfall inches (cm)	11.2 (28)	7.9 (20)	4.2 (11)	0.6 (1.5)	0.0 (0.0)	0.0 (0.0)	0.0 (0.0)	0.0 (0.0)	0.0 (0.0)	0.0 (0.0)	1.8 (4.6)	8.1 (21)	32.2 (82)
Average precipitation days (≥ 0.01 in)	11.5	9.4	11.9	12.8	12.8	11.9	9.8	9.1	8.4	9.5	10.4	11.3	128.8
Average snowy days (≥ 0.1 in)	6.5	4.8	2.6	0.3	0.0	0.0	0.0	0.0	0.0	0.1	1.2	5.0	20.5
Source 1: NOAA
Source 2: National Weather Service

== Demographics ==
Historical population
Census	Pop.	Note	%±
1850	197		—
1860	513		160.4%
1870	892		73.9%
1880	1,250		40.1%
1890	2,697		115.8%
1900	3,764		39.6%
1910	4,075		8.3%
1920	4,507		10.6%
1930	4,861		7.9%
1940	5,101		4.9%
1950	5,633		10.4%
1960	5,604		−0.5%
1970	5,313		−5.2%
1980	5,004		−5.8%
1990	4,751		−5.1%
2000	5,251		10.5%
2010	5,106		−2.8%
2020	5,275		3.3%
U.S. Decennial Census

=== 2020 census ===
As of the 2020 census, Tipton had a population of 5,275. The median age was 41.9 years. 22.0% of residents were under the age of 18 and 21.9% of residents were 65 years of age or older. For every 100 females there were 88.7 males, and for every 100 females age 18 and over there were 85.0 males age 18 and over.

99.6% of residents lived in urban areas, while 0.4% lived in rural areas.

There were 2,238 households in Tipton, of which 27.4% had children under the age of 18 living in them. Of all households, 39.6% were married-couple households, 19.7% were households with a male householder and no spouse or partner present, and 32.4% were households with a female householder and no spouse or partner present. About 34.6% of all households were made up of individuals and 17.5% had someone living alone who was 65 years of age or older.

There were 2,443 housing units, of which 8.4% were vacant. The homeowner vacancy rate was 3.0% and the rental vacancy rate was 6.5%.

Racial composition as of the 2020 census
Race	Number	Percent
White	4,943	93.7%
Black or African American	17	0.3%
American Indian and Alaska Native	6	0.1%
Asian	21	0.4%
Native Hawaiian and Other Pacific Islander	2	0.0%
Some other race	80	1.5%
Two or more races	206	3.9%
Hispanic or Latino (of any race)	180	3.4%

=== 2010 census ===
As of the census of 2010, there were 5,106 people, 2,218 households, and 1,356 families residing in the city. The population density was 2,042.4 inhabitants per square mile (788.6/km^{2}). There were 2,471 housing units at an average density of 988.4 per square mile (381.6/km^{2}). The racial makeup of the city was 97.1% White, 0.1% Black, 0.2% Native American, 0.6% Asian, 0.7% from other races, and 1.3% from two or more races. Hispanic or Latino of any race were 2.7% of the population.

There were 2,218 households, of which 29.9% had children under the age of 18 living with them, 42.3% were married couples living together, 14.1% had a female householder with no husband present, 4.8% had a male householder with no wife present, and 38.9% were non-families. 34.9% of all households were made up of individuals, and 17.2% had someone living alone who was 65 years of age or older. The average household size was 2.28 and the average family size was 2.91.

The median age in the city was 39.9 years. 24.2% of residents were under the age of 18; 8.3% were between the ages of 18 and 24; 24.3% were from 25 to 44; 25.9% were from 45 to 64; and 17.5% were 65 years of age or older. The gender makeup of the city was 46.9% male and 53.1% female.

=== 2000 census ===
As of the census of 2000, there were 5,251 people, 2,239 households, and 1,415 families residing in the city. The population density was 2,834.9 inhabitants per square mile (1,094.6/km^{2}). There were 2,401 housing units at an average density of 1,296.2 per square mile (500.5/km^{2}). The racial makeup of the city was 98.00% White, 0.15% African American, 0.17% Native American, 0.55% Asian, 0.27% from other races, and 0.86% from two or more races. Hispanic or Latino of any race were 1.54% of the population.

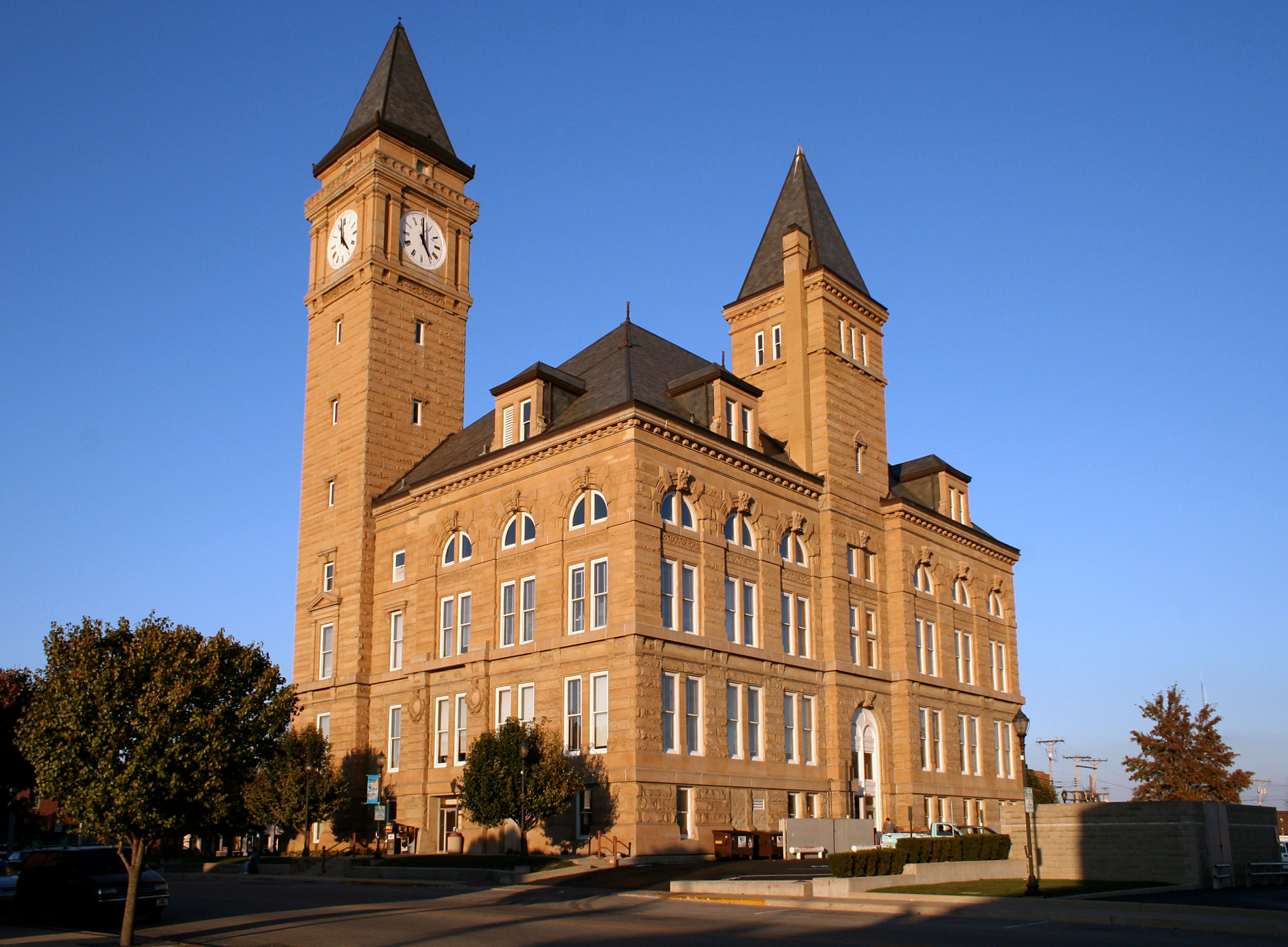
Tipton County courthouse

There were 2,239 households, out of which 29.4% had children under the age of 18 living with them, 47.9% were married couples living together, 11.1% had a female householder with no husband present, and 36.8% were non-families. 32.5% of all households were made up of individuals, and 15.9% had someone living alone who was 65 years of age or older. The average household size was 2.30 and the average family size was 2.91. In the city, the population was spread out, with 23.7% under the age of 18, 8.1% from 18 to 24, 28.5% from 25 to 44, 22.2% from 45 to 64, and 17.5% who were 65 years of age or older. The median age was 38 years. For every 100 females, there were 88.6 males. For every 100 females age 18 and over, there were 83.6 males.

The median income for a household in the city was $34,075, and the median income for a family was $47,083. Males had a median income of $35,805 versus $22,112 for females. The per capita income for the city was $19,489. About 3.8% of families and 7.2% of the population were below the poverty line, including 7.2% of those under age 18 and 9.6% of those age 65 or over.

== Economy ==
=== 19th century ===
Daniel Smith opened the first tavern in Tipton, then known as Canton, called the Canton House. A second tavern was opened in 1846 by Andrew J. Redmond, who would eventually become the town sheriff. John Cassler was the first merchant to locate his business in Tipton. On the east side of the town square, Cassler ran his business out of a log cabin. In 1845, he was granted the license to sell groceries and liquor. Starting in 1850, Newton J. Jackson began selling goods. He eventually became the first auditor for the county. Charles and Conde Bishop were the first carpenters in Tipton. A tanyard was founded by William and Elijah Hall in 1847. The business closed in 1882 due to innovations in tanning. Merchandise was delivered to Tipton via wagons and on horseback from Lafayette, Peru, and Indianapolis. By 1851, Tipton had blacksmiths, a cabinetmaker, a bakery, a saddlery, and a gunsmith. The Young Furniture Company was founded in 1850.

=== 20th century ===
The Lake Erie & Western Shops were located in Tipton, which, as of 1914, employed 350-400 people. The Tipton Chamber of Commerce was founded on March 24, 1914. Canning was a popular industry in Tipton during the early 20th century. The industry was brought to Tipton by N.S. Martz. Tomato processing was common due to the high quality black loam in the area. The Fame Canning Company canned corn, peas and tomatoes. The Snider Preserve Company processed tomato pulp. The Oakes Manufacturing Company produced poultry incubators and related supplies for international distribution. There were two buggy factories in Tipton, too: the Binkley Buggy Company and the Charles Bros. Carriage Factory. The J.J. McIntosh broom factory was the largest in the state.

=== Tourism ===
A hotel was founded in 1852 by Harrison A. Woodruff. As of 1914, the hotel had become the location of an Oddfellows hall. A second hotel, the Smith Hotel, was built in 1852, too, at the corner of Main and Jefferson. Two additional hotels were built in the town, the City Hotel, which is no longer standing, and a frame hotel built by John Long in 1865. The hotel was destroyed by a fire in 1873. A brick hotel was built on the same site, called the Commercial Hotel. In 1914, it was described as "a first-class hotel," with "all modern hotel conveniences."

== Arts and culture ==
The city library was founded in 1900 and built in 1901. It opened in Spring 1901 and over 500 books were donated to the library. In 1915, Andrew Carnegie donated $10,000 to the city with the agreement that city would contribute $1,000 towards library operations annually. The Carnegie Library began construction on October 15, 1902. The library does not stand today. An endowment was founded by a donor, Nannie R. Shirk, who named the endowment after her late husband, E.H. Shirk.

=== Annual cultural events ===
Every year, the weekend after Labor Day the Tipton County Pork Festival takes place. The event features a parade, a queen contest where Miss Pork Cuisine is crowned, food and music.

== Parks and recreation ==
In the early 20th century, 26 acres of land were set aside for a Tipton City Park, with streams and trees. The park was prone to flooding from Cicero Creek, however, during the summer, the park was popular for its honeysuckle plants.

== Education ==
=== Early history ===
The first school to open in Tipton was in the winter of 1846–7. School took place at a log cabin in what is now downtown Tipton. Students attended school two to three months out of the year. Teachers were poorly paid and often boarded with the families of the students they taught to make ends meet. A frame school house was built in 1852, which provided a permanent learning space for residents. The school was also used as a church at times, and as of 1914 a church had been built on the former school site.

In 1867, a new school was built due to the growth of the population. The new school cost $15,000, had two stories and six rooms and a library. Classes were first held in 1869. A second school, totaling eight rooms, was built in 1890. A high school was built in 1910.

The Sisters of St. Joseph came to Tipton in 1888 and founded a parochial school called St. Joseph's Academy. The school served high school students. It ceased operations in 1972.

=== Today ===
==== Primary and secondary schooling ====
Tipton Community School Corporation serves the city of Tipton, and the southern half of Tipton County, with an elementary school, middle school, and Tipton High School co-located on one campus on the south-side of town. District enrollment for the 2014–15 school year comprised 1,732 students. As of 2006, 93% of the school population was Caucasian.

Tipton Schools counts 1,851 students in K-12, with 97% being white, and the remaining 3% either African-American, Hispanic, Native American, Indian, or multiracial. St. John the Baptist School served grades K-5, and was a Roman Catholic school. This institution closed in 2014 due to low enrollment.

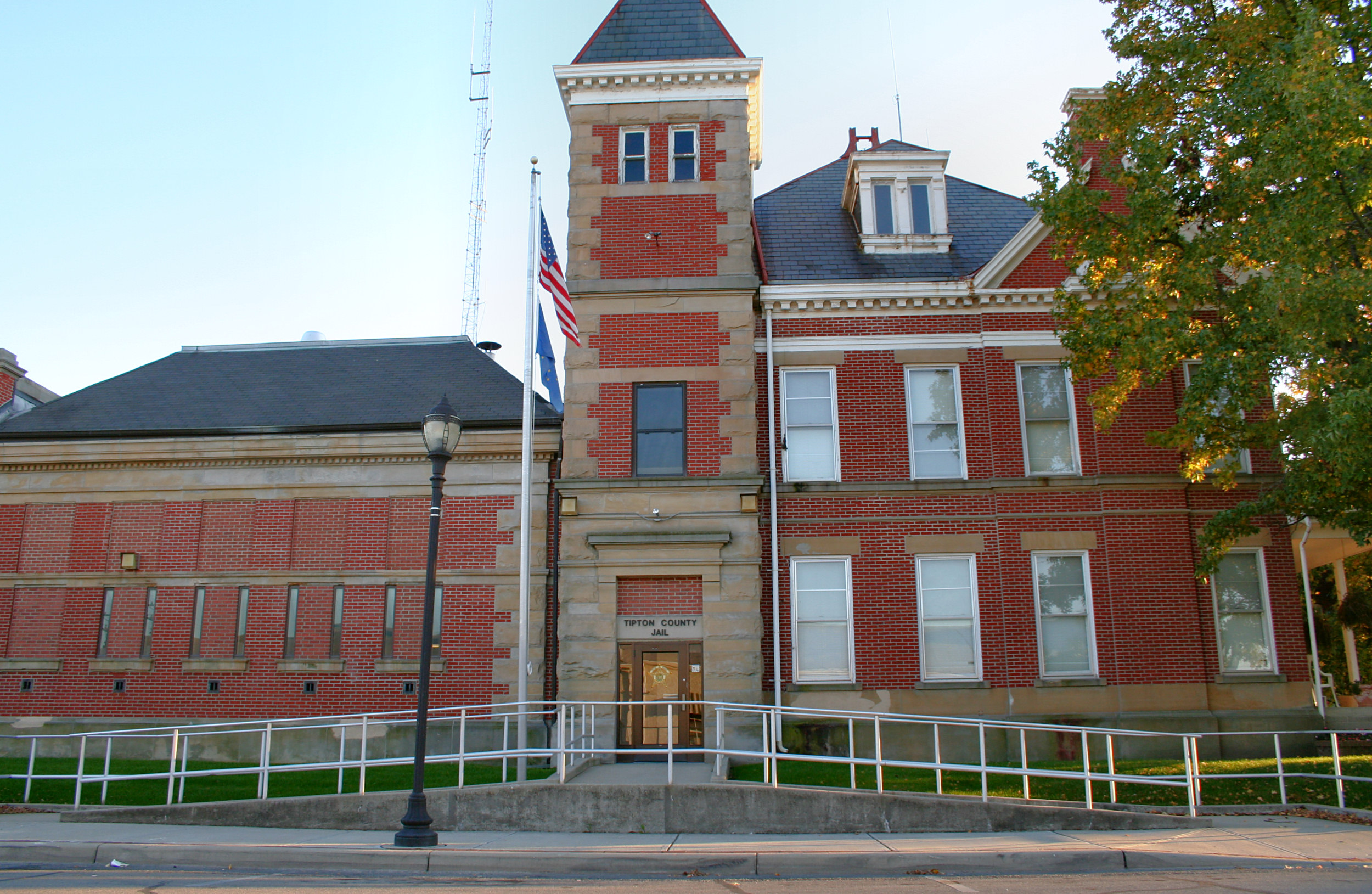
Tipton County jail.

Tipton has a public library, a branch of the Tipton County Public Library.

== Infrastructure ==
=== Transportation ===
In the mid to late 19th century, Tipton was known as being a very dirty and muddy place. Transportation was poor, with a poorly maintained railroad and "mud boats" being noted types of transportation. Mud boats were boat-like vehicles which were powered by oxen and transported people through the large amounts of mud in the area. Flooding was also common during this period.

In 1890, Tipton became the first city in the state to have brick paved streets. Representatives from Tipton traveled to Bloomington, Illinois, to examine that city's brick streets and upon returning to Tipton they commissioned 2 1/2 blocks of brick paving on Jefferson Street. It was resurfaced with brick in 1914. Even in 1914, Tipton had more paved streets than any other city in the state.

Highways

- State Road 19 to State Road 22 (North) and Noblesville, Indiana (South)
- State Road 28 to Frankfort, Indiana (West) and Elwood, Indiana (East)

RailRoads Historically, Tipton had no formal railroad. Around 1850, a railroad was located in the area and was described by a visitor as being "the worst railroad bed I had ever seen." The train would stop anywhere on the line and pick up people, not needing a proper station. It sometimes did not stop, moving slowly enough that people could jump onto it.

- Norfolk Southern Railway

=== Utilities ===
The Tipton Light, Heat and Power Company was founded in 1888. Citizens' Gas Company as founded in 1892. Indiana Gas Light Company bought Citizens' in 1913. Natural gas was piped in from West Virginia to a depot in Elwood for distribution in Tipton. The Tipton Electric Light and Water Works was founded in 1898. The water supply station was built in 1894-5 for $3,500. As of 1914, Tipton had a sewer system with 12 miles of piping.

=== Healthcare ===
As of 1845, Tipton had no proper healthcare. Quinine and whiskey were used to help with miasma from the surrounding wetlands and country. By 1850, the first physician had founded his practice in Tipton, Isaac Parker. In 1854, the town suffered from a cholera epidemic.

== Notable people ==
- Babe Adams (baseball player) was born in Tipton in 1882. He played with the Pittsburgh Pirates
- John Bunch (jazz pianist) was born in Tipton in 1921.
- Chris Faulkner (football player) was born in Tipton in 1960.
- Brad Maynard, NFL punter who played most of his career with the Chicago Bears
- James T. Sears (author and professor) was born in Tipton in 1951.
- Charles Tidler, playwright
- Rossini Vrionides (composer and actress) was born in Tipton in 1896.
- Daniel W. Waugh, U.S. representative from Indiana
