= Elwood Haynes Museum =

Historic house in Indiana, United States

- Elwood Haynes House
- U.S. National Register of Historic Places
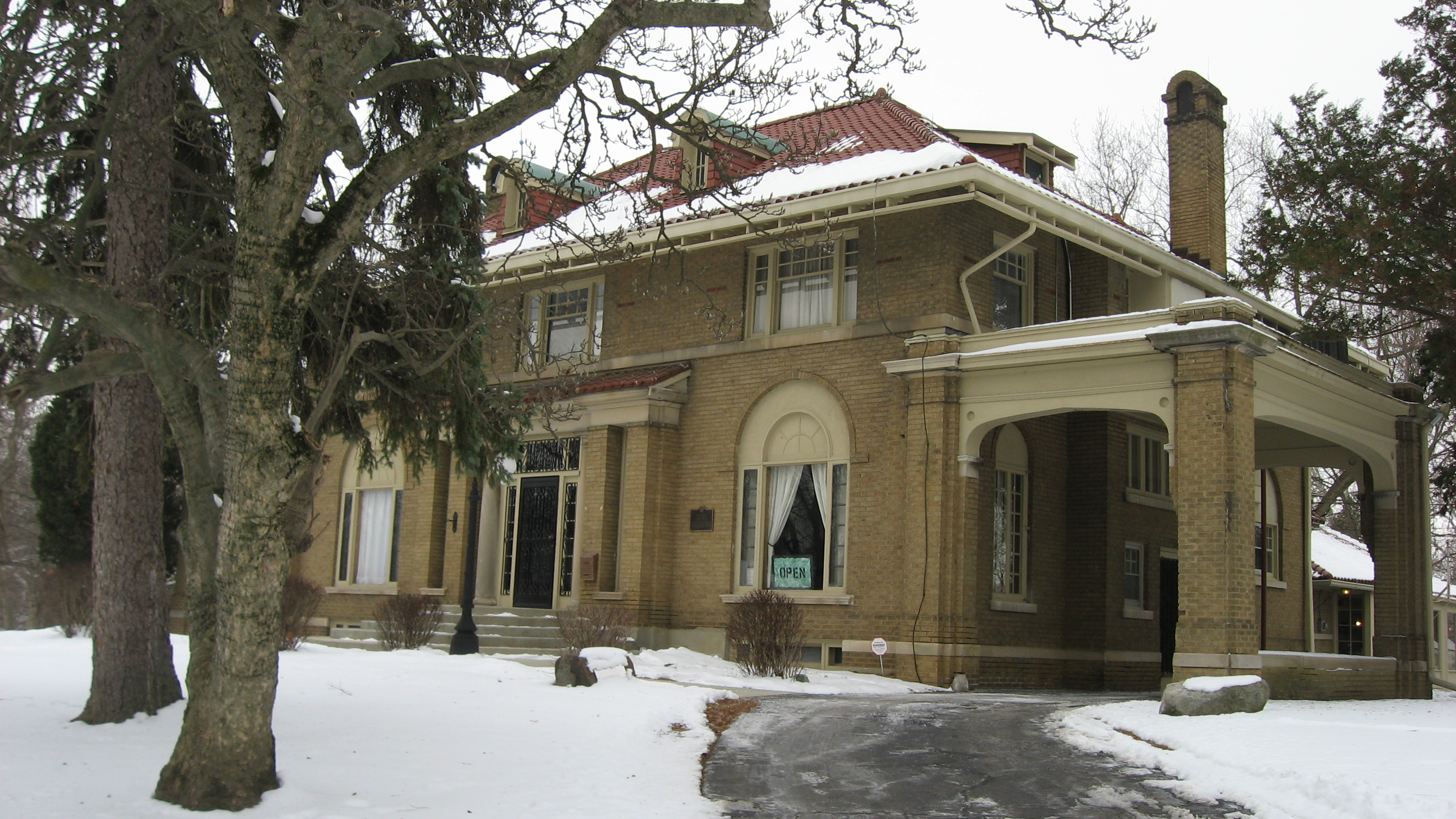
- Front of the house

- Location within Indiana Location within the United States
- Location: 1915 S. Webster St., Kokomo, Indiana
- Coordinates: 40°27′47″N 86°8′13″W
- Area: 2.1 acres (0.85 ha)
- Built: 1916
- Architect: Young, R.L.
- Architectural style: Prairie School
- NRHP reference No.: 84001054
- Added to NRHP: September 20, 1984

The Elwood Haynes Museum is a museum in the former mansion owned by Elwood Haynes located in Kokomo, Indiana. Haynes was an inventor who is credited with being the first to produce cars commercially in 1894. He also invented stainless steel and stellite. He became a millionaire in 1916 and had the mansion located on south Webster Street built, where he lived until his death in 1925.

In 1957, the mansion was sold by Elwood's son, March Haynes, to Martin J. Caserio, General Manager of Delco Radio Division of General Motors, who lived in it with his family. When Caserio was transferred to Detroit in 1964, GM purchased the house in the Executive Relocation Program and it stood vacant until 1965 when it was purchased by Elwood Haynes' daughter, Bernice Haynes Hillis, who donated it to the city of Kokomo for the purpose it currently serves today. Since 1967 it has been open to the public and the museum curators have collected many of Haynes' original inventions to display in the building. Also housed in the museum are over 15,000 documents and photographs from Haynes' personal and business correspondence dating from 1877. The museum features exhibits on the life of Haynes and is open the public who can tour the building. His private laboratory is located across the street but is currently a private residence and cannot be toured.

It was added to the National Register of Historic Places in 1984.

== See also ==
- Haynes-Apperson
- Haynes Automobile Company
