= Elwood Haynes =

American inventor (1857–1925)

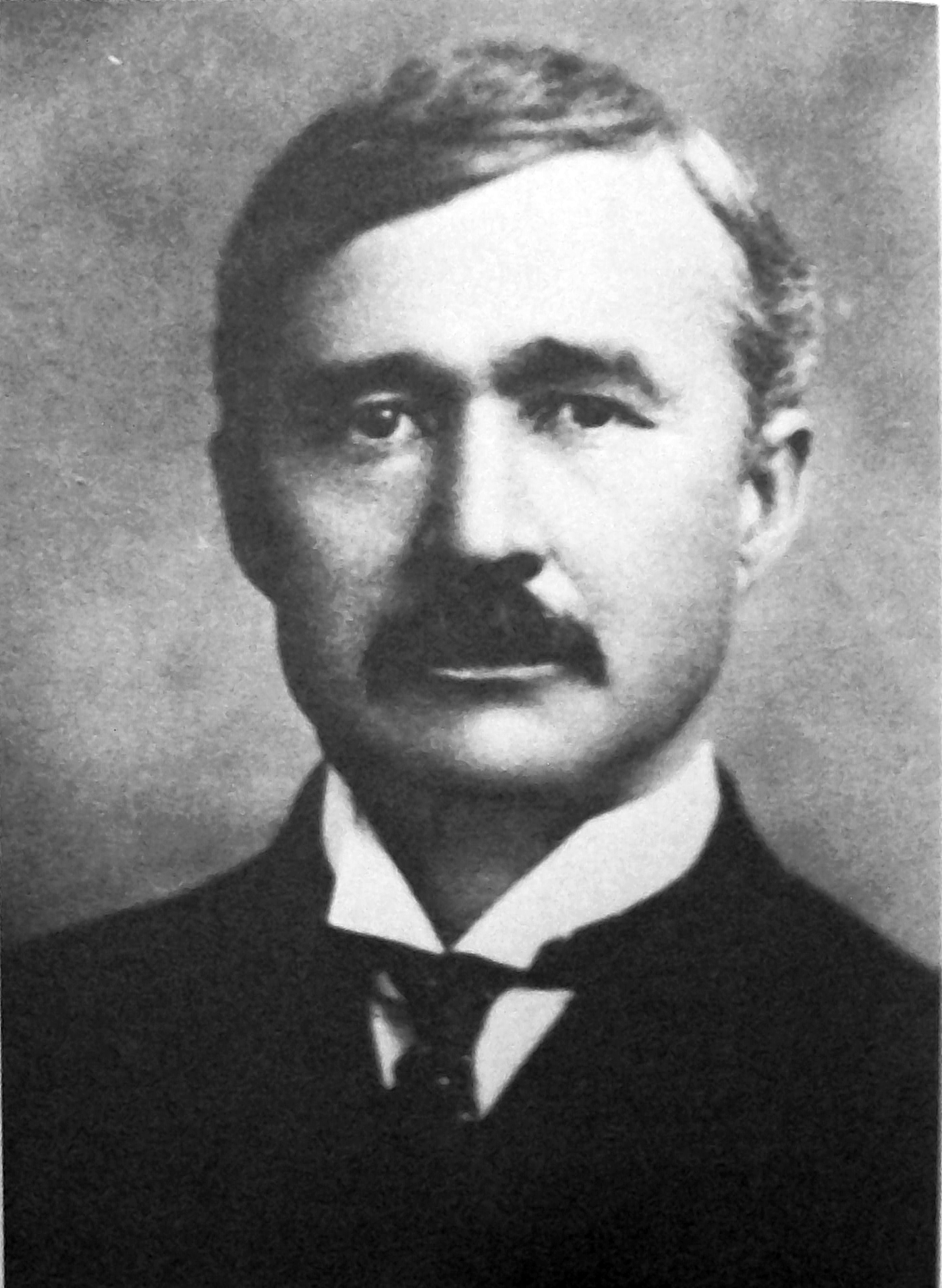
- Born: October 14, 1857; Portland, Indiana
- Died: April 13, 1925 (aged 67); Kokomo, Indiana
- Education: Chemistry; Biology; Metallurgy
- Alma mater: Worcester Technical Institute; Johns Hopkins University
- Occupations: Natural Gas; Automotive; Foundry \ Metal casting; Industrialist
- Known for: Automotive innovations; Inventor of Stellite; Inventor of stainless steel tableware
- Notable work: Haynes-Apperson; Haynes Automobile Company; Haynes Stellite Company
- Political party: Prohibition Party (1900–1919); Republican Party (1920–1925)
- Board member of: Indiana Board of Education (1920–1925); American Steel board of directors (1913–1925); President of the YMCA (1919–1921)
- Spouse: Bertha Beatrice Lanterman (1887–1925)
- Children: Bernice and March
- Parent(s): Jacob and Hilinda Haynes

Signature
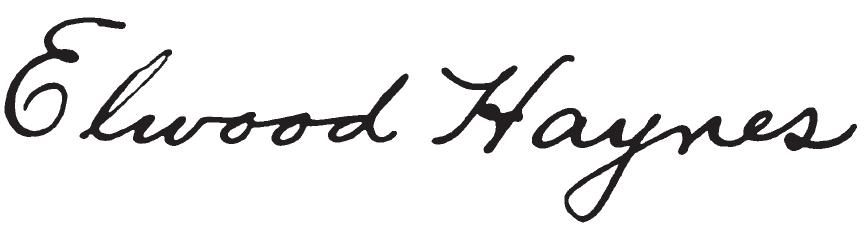

Elwood Haynes (October 14, 1857 – April 13, 1925) was an American inventor, metallurgist, automotive pioneer, entrepreneur, and industrialist. He invented the metal alloy stellite and independently co-discovered martensitic stainless steel along with Englishman Harry Brearley in 1912 and designed one of the earliest automobiles made in the United States. He is recognized for having created the earliest American design that was feasible for mass production and, with the Apperson brothers, he formed the first company in the United States to produce automobiles profitably. He made many advances in the automotive industry.

Early in his career, while serving as a field superintendent at gas and oil companies during Indiana's gas boom, Haynes invented several devices important to the advance of the natural gas industry. When working for the Indiana Natural Gas and Oil Company, he oversaw the construction of the first long-distance natural gas pipeline in the United States, connecting Chicago with the Trenton Gas Field 150 miles (240 km) away. He began to formulate plans for a motorized vehicle in the early 1890s; he successfully road tested his first car, the Pioneer, on July 4, 1894—eight years after the first automobile was patented in Germany. He formed a partnership with Elmer and Edgar Apperson in 1896 to start Haynes-Apperson for the commercial production of automobiles. He renamed it Haynes Automobile Company in 1905, following the loss of his partners.

Working in his laboratory to develop new corrosion-resistant metals for auto parts, Haynes discovered that mixing tungsten with chromium, steel and iron resulted in the formation of strong and lightweight alloys that were impervious to corrosion, and could endure high temperatures.

In 1912, he formed Haynes Stellite Company to produce one of the new alloys, and received lucrative contracts during World War I, making Haynes a millionaire in 1916. He sold his patent for stainless steel to the American Stainless Steel Company in exchange for enough stock to gain a seat at the company's board of directors, a position he held for 12 years. He merged the Haynes Stellite company with Union Carbide in 1920. After passing through different owners, the company was renamed and is now called Haynes International. Haynes returned his focus to his automotive company, but in the economic recession of the 1920s the business went bankrupt and was liquidated.

An outspoken advocate of prohibition, he made substantial donations to the Prohibition Party and Indiana's prohibitionist leader Frank Hanly. Haynes ran an unsuccessful campaign in Indiana for the U.S. Senate in 1916 as a prohibition candidate and remained active in the party until prohibition became law. Later, he became a philanthropist and served two terms as president of the YMCA, five years on the Indiana Board of Education, and was an active member of the Presbyterian church. After his death from complications arising from influenza, his Kokomo mansion was converted into the Elwood Haynes Museum and is open to the public where many of his original inventions and automobiles are on display.

== Early life ==
=== Family and background ===
Haynes was born on October 14, 1857, in Portland, Indiana, the fifth of ten children of Jacob M. Haynes and Hilinda S. Haines Haynes. His family was of English descent; he was a ninth-generation descendant of Walter Haynes who immigrated from Wiltshire, England to Sudbury, Massachusetts in 1638. His father was Jay County's school commissioner, a lawyer, Whig politician, and a judge of the Jay and Randolph County common pleas court. Both of Haynes' parents were dedicated Presbyterians and outspoken prohibitionists and educated their children from a young age to avoid liquor. His mother was the founder of a local Women's Temperance Movement Union. His paternal grandfather Henry Haynes was a gunsmith and mechanic, and tutored Haynes about metallurgy. In 1866, the family moved from their two-room house in Portland into the countryside outside of town where they purchased a larger home to better accommodate their growing number of children.

At age 12, Haynes built his first vehicle from scrap railroad car parts and operated it on the county's railroad tracks. The local railroad foreman did not approve and later seized the vehicle and destroyed it. As a child, Haynes had an interest in chemistry and metallurgy and when he was 15 he built a smelting furnace and began working with copper, bronze, and iron. Haynes was also interested in nature and spent considerable time in the forest cataloging and observing plants, insects, and animals. Because he spent so much time there, his family nicknamed him "Wood", a nickname they used for most of his life. As he grew older, he became an avid reader of books, including Principles of Natural Philosophy and Chemistry by William Wells. His early experiments and studies interested him in the fundamental properties of matter, and he was intrigued by how mixing compounds could create completely different alloys.

=== Education ===
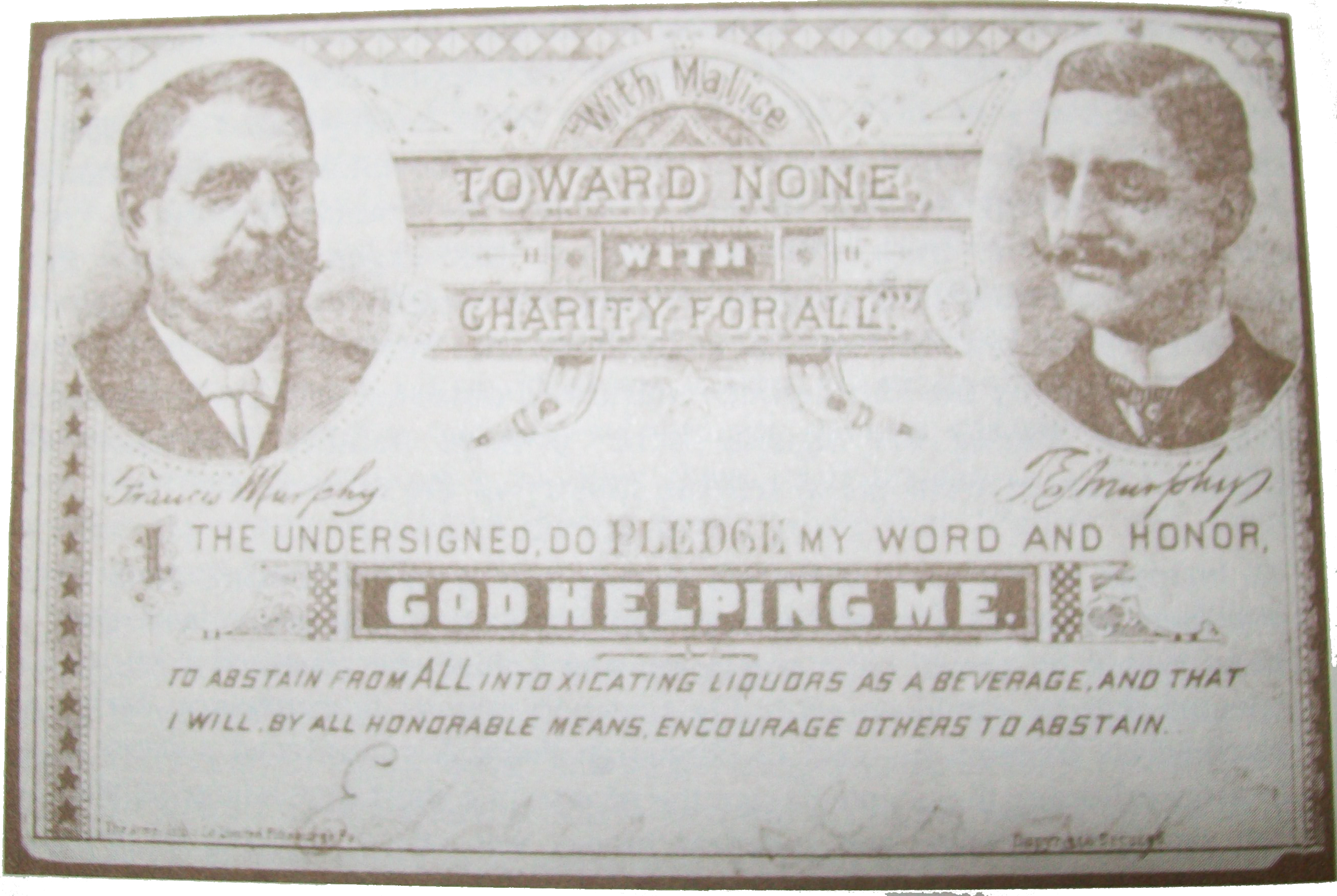
Haynes' Francis Murphy Temperance pledge card

Haynes attended public schools through eighth grade and received a basic education. He had not determined a career path for himself and his parents often criticized him for lacking ambition; they insisted that he seek employment. He began by working as a custodian at a local church and later for the railroad, hauling ballast to construction sites. At the church, he joined the choir where he met and began to court Bertha Lanterman. When Portland's first public high school was opened in 1876, Haynes returned to school at age 19 and completed two more years. Bertha and her family moved to Alabama during the spring of 1877, and Haynes began a regular correspondence with her. During the summer of that year, a series of revival meetings were held in Indiana by Francis Murphy, a leader of a national temperance organization known as the Murphy Movement. Haynes attended the meetings, probably at his parents' urging, and became interested in temperance. He took two of Murphy's pledge cards and carried one for most of his life; the other he mailed to Bertha.

Haynes' father attended the Philadelphia Centennial Exposition in 1876 where he learned of a school that would fit his son's interests. Using the money he had saved, Haynes decided to attend the college and enrolled in the Worcester Technical Institute in Worcester, Massachusetts, in September 1878. The school was revolutionary for its time, combining technical training with a classical liberal arts education. Although he easily passed the difficult entrance exam, he found that he was ill-prepared for some of his college courses, and he struggled with mathematics. To earn an income while away from home, he worked as a custodian and night guard at the local public library. He cleaned the building overnight and used his spare time to read books and study. During his final year at the school, boarding rates were increased beyond what Haynes could afford so with no other option, he lived in the library for several months. He could not afford to return home during his stay at the institute, so during the holidays he spent time with his family and friends in New England.

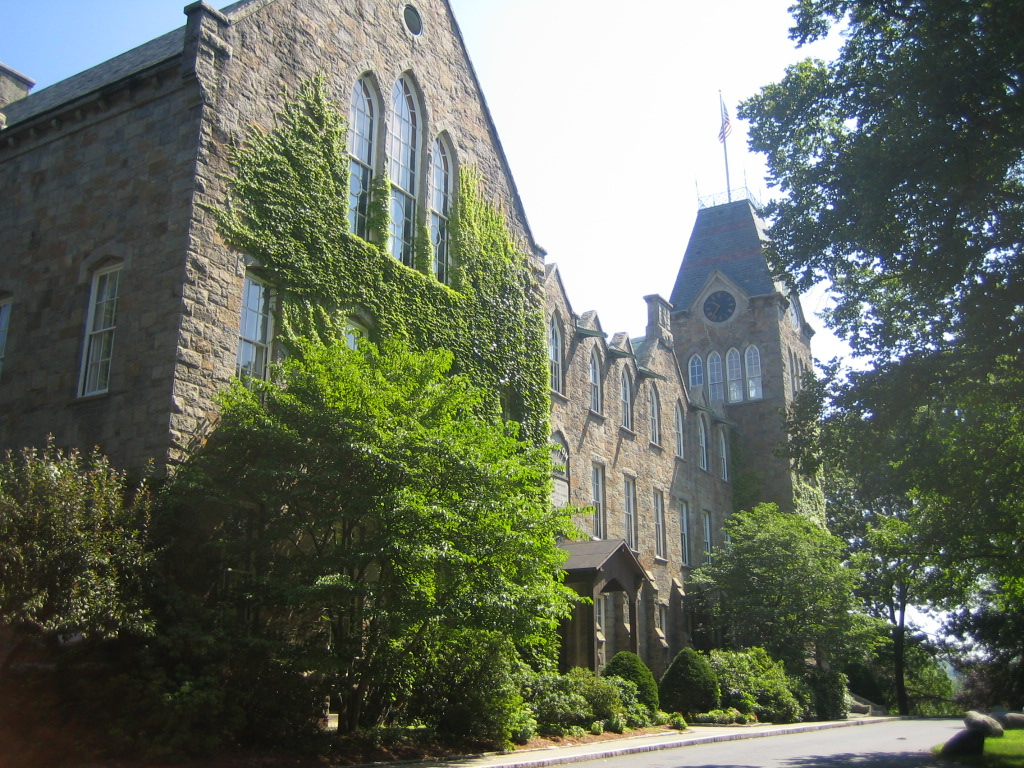
Boynton Hall at Worcester Technical Institute

During his first term, he was required to receive a grade of 60 to remain in the school. Although he only achieved a 59.2 after completing his final exams, he was permitted to remain because of his "recent progress." Older than the other students in his class, he often spoke out against their use of alcohol. In his final year he took courses in metallurgy, ore analysis and assaying, and participated in a research project developing razors. His graduation thesis was entitled "The effects of Tungsten on Iron and Steel". It laid out the basic principles of what would later become his two greatest advances in metallurgy. Haynes spent many hours in the institute's laboratory working with tungsten and other metals before graduating in 1881; he was fourteenth out of twenty-one graduates—twenty did not pass.

Haynes took a job teaching at the Jay County public school after returning home. Soon his income allowed him to buy a home near Portland High School where he worked and was promoted to principal in 1882. That summer he took a week-long trip to visit Bertha in Chattanooga, Tennessee, where he became sick with a cold and spent most of his time in bed nursed by Bertha, learning that her family would be returning to live in Portland in 1883. After returning from the trip, he continued saving money and in 1884 he decided to continue his education by enrolling at Johns Hopkins University in Baltimore, Maryland. He chose the school because, as it was only eight years old, it had one of the most modern laboratories available. He took courses in chemistry and biology and learned advanced metallurgic techniques. His mother died in May 1885 and he decided to leave the university without completing his second year, as he was not working to attain a degree but only taking courses of interest. After he had returned home again, he took a position at the newly established Eastern Indiana Normal School and Commercial College (now Ball State University) and served as the head of the chemistry department.

=== Gas boom ===
Natural gas was first found in Indiana in 1876 but it was not until 1886 that the magnitude of the discovery was known; the Trenton Gas Field was the largest deposit of natural gas discovered in the 19th century and the first giant oil reserve found in the United States. As a professor at a university in the Trenton Field, Haynes offered his services to the drillers and worked to analyze soil samples, determine well pressure, and give estimates on the amount of energy that could be created by the gas. He delivered several lectures to large crowds about the importance of the gas discovery and the many possible applications of this new source of fuel. He began a petition to have the local citizens create a corporation to pump the fuel from the ground and pipe it to area homes and businesses. His promotion was successful and Portland Natural Gas and Oil Company was formed; Haynes' father was named to the new company's board of directors.

In the fall of 1886, the board hired Haynes as superintendent to manage the company and oversee the creation of wells and piping. The company was one of the first in the Trenton Field, and many of the others which soon followed modeled themselves on the Portland company. As a fuel and industry, natural gas was in its earliest stages. Haynes invented several devices that became important to the success of the industry. One of his first inventions was a device capable of measuring the amount of gas being pumped from wells. Haynes' reputation as an industry leader grew out of his operations at Portland and the Kokomo Democrat referred to him as "the only infallible authority on natural gas in eastern Indiana" in an 1889 article.

Haynes married Bertha Lanterman in October 1887 after a ten-year relationship. The ceremony was held at her parents' Portland home and the couple honeymooned in Cincinnati. Their first child, Marie, was born on January 28, 1889, but she soon succumbed to illness and died when six months old. Their second child, a son born in 1890, also died in infancy. The deaths saddened the family and caused them to turn more to their religion. Haynes became increasingly active in the Presbyterian church and became an elder. In December 1892, the Haynes' third child, Bernice, was born. A second son, March, was born 1896. The two children were well educated and grew up to assist their father in his enterprises.

A primary pipeline was laid between Portland and a neighboring town during 1889. Haynes oversaw construction of the ten-mile (16 km) long pipeline and the creation of the wells for pumping the gas. During his numerous buggy rides between the two towns, he first began to conceive of a novel form of motorized transportation. His thoughts on the topic were spurred by his need to regularly change horses because of their inability to endure the long distances and sandy roads he frequently traveled. He theorized that a motorized vehicle would be more economical than horse-and-buggy transportation, and could potentially move at a faster speed.

The Indiana Natural Gas and Oil Company, headquartered in Chicago, hired Haynes as their field superintendent in 1890 after the company's board of directors "discovered that Elwood Haynes knew more about natural gas than anyone in the state". He and his wife moved to Greentown where he oversaw the construction of the company's first pumping wells. The company planned to construct a natural gas line from eastern Indiana to Chicago, a distance of over 150 miles (240 km), which would be the first long-distance natural gas pipeline built in the United States. Haynes supervised the design and construction phases of the project. Because of the length of the line and the temperature changes between the two points, moisture in the natural gas condensed on the pipe, and during colder times would freeze the pipes in some locations. The problem was a significant setback to the operation, which had to stop pumping during the winter months. Haynes solved the problem by creating a refrigeration device that would cause the moisture (which was a diluted form of gasoline) to condense, freeze, and fall into a reservoir. These devices were installed between the main lines and pumping stations and effectively removed all the moisture from the natural gas before it was pumped into the lines. This prevented water buildup in the pipes and allowed the pipes to be used year-round. The concept was a significant advance in early refrigeration technology and was further developed by others in later years.

Haynes was offered a higher ranking position within Indiana Gas at the Chicago headquarters, but by then he had become aware of the business's connection to the corrupt and disgraced monopolist Charles T. Yerkes. A deeply religious man who feared involvement in any corruption, Haynes entertained the offer only briefly; Bertha's advice to refuse the position persuaded him and he declined the offer and instead sought a position more removed from the company's Chicago leadership. After the pipeline became fully operational in 1892, Haynes moved to Kokomo where he was made a supervisor of the Indiana Gas's local operations. The Indiana General Assembly began attempts to regulate the gas industry and accused the field operations of various companies of gross waste; Indiana Gas became the primary target of scathing reports. Haynes helped the company compile reports and offered opinions on the validity of their claims. He was disturbed to find that many of the claims proved true, and advocated that the gas be used more conservatively. He specifically recommended that the flambeaus (the flames fed by natural gas to show that the gas was flowing) be extinguished, as they were found to be the largest source of waste. He calculated that the company daily wasted $10,000 ($240,000 in 2009 chained dollars) worth of gas by burning flambeaus, a figure that shocked the company's leaders. Despite his support of the governmental anti-waste regulations, he was steadfastly against other rules that regulated pressure and hindered productivity. He personally filed lawsuits against the regulations a month after their passage, claiming that the government had no right to regulate artificial increases in well pressure. The court case continued until 1896, when the Indiana Supreme Court ruled that the regulations were unconstitutional. The entire set of regulations was repealed, including the anti-waste measures. The gross waste continued among other companies and the field's wells began to run dry by 1905—modern experts estimate as much as 90% of the one trillion cubic feet (30 km^{3}) of natural gas in the field was lost into the atmosphere or misused.

== Enterprises ==
=== 1894 First Haynes car ===
According to Haynes, he began laying out "plans for the construction of a mechanically propelled vehicle for use on highways" in 1891. His first idea was for a steam-powered vehicle, but after careful consideration he decided the use of a furnace on the device would be too dangerous. His second plan was to use electrical power, but after research he found that no practical means existed to store the electricity required for operation. He continued to develop his plans until the summer of 1893 when he attended the Chicago World's Fair, where he first witnessed a gasoline engine. The demonstration of the newly invented engine inspired him to decide that an internal combustion engine would be the most practical method to propel his vehicle. A gasoline-powered European automobile built by German inventor Karl Benz (who patented the first automobile in 1886) also was on display during the fair, although it is unknown if Haynes witnessed this vehicle during his visit.

Haynes ordered a one-horsepower marine upright, two-cycle engine from Sintz Gas Engine Company in Grand Rapids, Michigan for $225. Although the engine was intended for use on a small boat, Haynes believed it could be adapted for his purposes. The 180 lb (82 kg) engine arrived in the fall of 1893. Haynes soon had the device attached to a carriage he built in his kitchen. He found when he started the engine that its vibrations were too severe for the harness it was in, and before he could stop the engine it had done considerable damage to the carriage and the floor of his kitchen, and filled the room with smoke.

Haynes decided he needed a different facility to continue the experiment after his wife told him she would not abide his destruction of the family kitchen. He contacted Elmer Apperson, the operator of the Riverside Machine Works, and arranged to use a space in his shop for the continued development. He agreed to work on his vehicle only after-hours, pay 40 cents per hour for the help of Elmer and his brother Edgar, and to not hold them responsible should his project fail. He started building a new carriage, this time with a heavier steel harness. He described the appearance of the vehicle as a "small truck". The wheel axles were also made of steel and the entire front axle was constructed to swivel. A central column was built of steel and laid across the axles in such a way as to allow it move in all directions within a small radius to accommodate any sudden movements by the motor or vehicle.

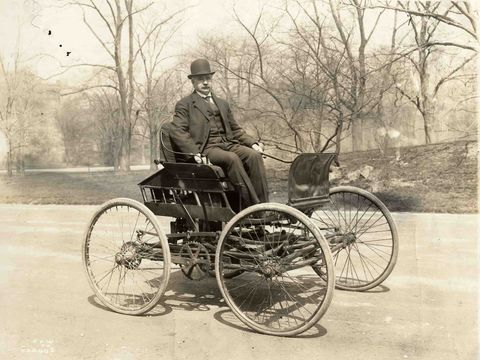
Elwood Haynes driving in his first automobile, the 1894 Pioneer, photo taken c. 1910

Because the traction of rubber tires was unknown, Haynes completed a series of tests with a bicycle on paved roads. He used a wagon built to the weight of his automobile and a horse to pull a device that would cause the wheels to turn, thereby providing traction. With this, he was able to determine the ratio of weight to gear sizes needed to enable the tires to provide sufficient traction for propulsion. Once completed, his vehicle weighed about 820 pounds (370 kg).

He named his car the Pioneer and first test drove the vehicle on July 4, 1894. The Apperson brothers had notified the Kokomo townspeople of the test drive and a crowd gathered to witness the event. Haynes was concerned that his vehicle could injure someone in the crowd, so he had the vehicle towed by a horse and buggy to Pumpkinvine Pike, away from the crowd. The car started with Haynes driving and Elmer Apperson riding as a passenger, and traveled at 7 mph (11 km/h). He traveled for 1.5 miles (2.4 km) and then stopped the vehicle to manually turn it around with Elmer's help. He proceeded to drive it several more miles back into town without stopping. His trip convinced him that the vehicle was worthwhile and could become a valuable enterprise, although he was disappointed in the vehicle's handling and decided he needed to improve the steering system and find a way to divert the motor's exhaust smoke away from the carriage.

Haynes' car is believed to be the second gasoline-engine powered vehicle successfully road tested in the United States, according to its exhibit information at the Smithsonian Institution. It was built two years before Henry Ford's Quadricycle, and preceded only by Charles Duryea's Motorized Wagon less than a year earlier. Unlike Duryea's car, which was an adapted buckboard wagon that was designed to run under its own power but still able to be pulled by horse, Haynes' car was designed only to run on its own. Some automotive historians use this difference to determine that Haynes' car was the first true American automobile. The Sintz company continued to be intrigued by Haynes' use of their motor and sent representatives to photo his vehicle and published the images as an advertisement for one of their engine's possible uses. The publicity spurred the creation of numerous other automobiles across the American midwest.

Haynes continued to drive his car as he added improvements to the vehicle, and constructed the Pioneer II in 1895 to incorporate his improved steering designs and an exhaust pipe. He built the new car with the intention of running it in the 1895 Chicago Times-Herald Race, the first automobile race in the United States. Although over seventy-five cars were entered in the race, most of their owners did not have them completed in time for race so only three cars and six early motorcycles showed up. While driving to the race, Haynes had a confrontation with a Chicago policeman who insisted that Haynes had no right to drive his vehicle on public roads, forcing him to requisition a horse to pull the car the rest of the way. Similar incidents happened with the other race's entries so the city passed an ordinance a few days later to clear up any ambiguity in the laws and allow automobiles equal access to the city streets, allowing the postponed race to take place. While giving his car a ride around the town on the following day Haynes was involved in what is believed to be the first automobile accident after swerving to miss a street car and striking a sharp curb, busting a tire and damaging the axle. Without a spare tire, Haynes was unable to run in the race. The race was held on November 28, and thousands of spectators turned out. Duryea's car won first place and a German Benz came in second. Another contest was held in which Haynes won a prize for most intuitive design.

=== Haynes-Apperson ===
Haynes continued to perfect his auto design, and in late 1895 he began his work to create a new hard alloy for use as a crankcase and other auto parts. His intent was to make a metal that would be resistant to rusting. He experimented with the use of aluminum and found that when used, it significantly deadened the noise produced by the engine parts. As his designs progressed, he decided to form a partnership for the manufacture of his vehicles. At the end of 1894, Haynes joined with Elmer and Edgar Apperson to create an automobile company and began producing cars that year. Their company is recognized as being the first viable automotive company in the United States, and the second company to produce autos commercially. The Duryea Motor Wagon Company had formed a year earlier, but went out of business after producing only thirteen vehicles. Haynes became involved in a dispute with the Duryea company over the advertisements Haynes-Apperson ran, claiming to have created the first automobile. The Haynes-Apperson advertisement was clearly false, but after Duryea's company went bankrupt in 1898, there was no one to continue to dispute the claim. "America's First Car" remained the company's motto for the rest of its existence.

By 1896, the company produced one new car every two to three weeks and built vehicles on order for $2,000. As the orders increased, the company formally incorporated as Haynes-Apperson on May 5, 1898, with $25,000 in capital from stock issued to Portland and Kokomo businessmen. At the end of that year the company relocated to a large factory it had built in Kokomo. Two new models were designed and the workforce expanded as production increased. Haynes-Apperson ran advertisements in area newspapers and demonstrated cars at county fairs and other exhibitions. Demand for the vehicles grew rapidly from five cars produced in 1898 to thirty in 1899, 192 in 1900, and 240 in 1901. The work kept the factory open 24 hours a day, and two shifts totaling more than 350 workers were needed to keep the factory running at capacity by 1902. Sales totaled over $400,000 that year.

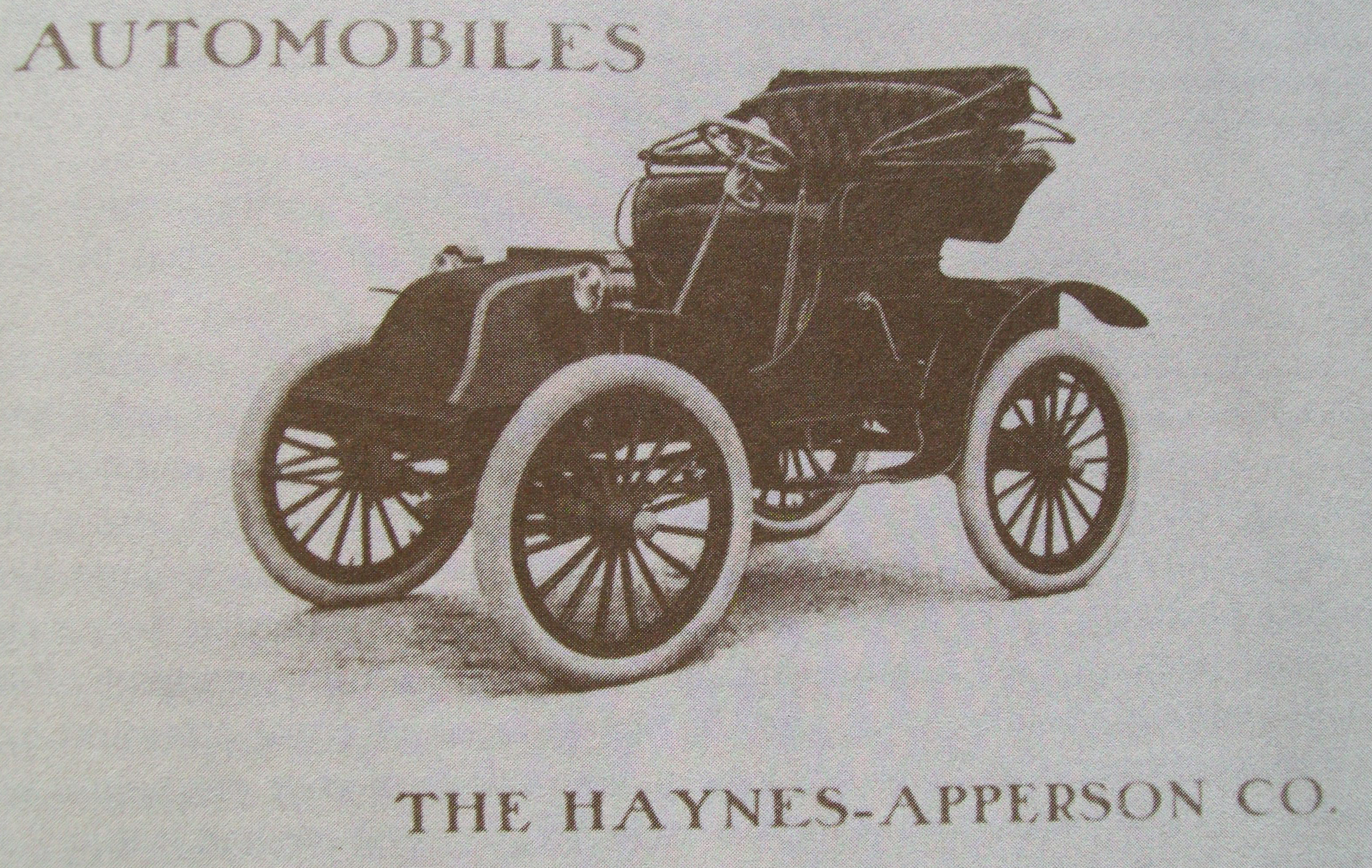
A 1903 Haynes-Apperson car advertisement

Haynes-Apperson automobiles were known for their long-distance running capability. The company's cars regularly competed and won prizes in endurance races that demonstrated the distance and terrain over which the cars could travel. Haynes had soon designed superior methods of achieving traction and his car could climb hills easier than his competitors in the early races. The last model designed under the Haynes-Apperson name had three speeds and was capable of 24 mph on pneumatic tires. In 1901, a Haynes car was entered in the first Long Island Non-Stop endurance race. The Haynes car took first place in the race, adding to the company's publicity and helping to feed a large jump in sales.

Another event to gain the company significant publicity was the sale of a car to Dr. Ashley A. Webber in New York City. Webber refused to buy any car unless the seller could prove the car's endurance by driving it to his home. Haynes and Edgar Apperson readily agreed to the demand and drove the car from Kokomo to Webber's New York home, the first time an automobile traveled over 1,000 miles (1,600 km). The trip took over a month; after driving several days in the rain, the two decided to install a roof on future models.

Haynes began to have disagreements with the Apperson brothers for reasons that were never made public but were probably over money and design plans. Haynes wanted to produce luxury cars because much of the company's early clientele was wealthy, while the Appersons wanted to produce utilitarian vehicles that could be marketed to businesses. The disagreement led the two brothers to split from Haynes and start a company of their own in 1902. The loss of his partners necessitated that Haynes leave his position at Indiana Gas to devote more time to his growing business. Haynes was most interested in working on development, and turned over daily management to Victor Minich in 1903. Haynes spent most of his research efforts developing metals in an attempt to discover lighter and stronger alloys for automobile parts. He also investigated other areas and published a 1906 paper on the impurities in gasoline and recommended that the sulfur content in the fuel be lowered to increase engine performance.

=== Haynes Automobile Company ===
In 1905, three years after the Apperson brothers split from Haynes, Haynes-Apperson was renamed the Haynes Automobile Company and Haynes launched a series of publicity campaigns. A parade of 2,000 cars was organized in New York City during 1908 and Haynes, whom many recognized as the inventor of the American automobile, led the parade down Broadway riding in the Pioneer. He was followed by ten Haynes cars, a model from each year to display the advancement in technology. On his way to the parade, Haynes was unaware of the city's newly established speeding laws and was arrested for driving too fast—in a car with a top speed of 15 mph (24 km/h)—and taken to jail. He was soon able to see a magistrate who released him after learning that he was Elwood Haynes and had come to lead the parade. The celebration was intended to be a ten-year commemoration of the invention of the automobile, although earlier self-vehicles dated back nearly twenty years in Europe. Haynes donated the Pioneer to the United States Government in 1910 to be placed in the Smithsonian Institution where it is still on display in the National Museum of American History as the second oldest motorized vehicle in the United States.

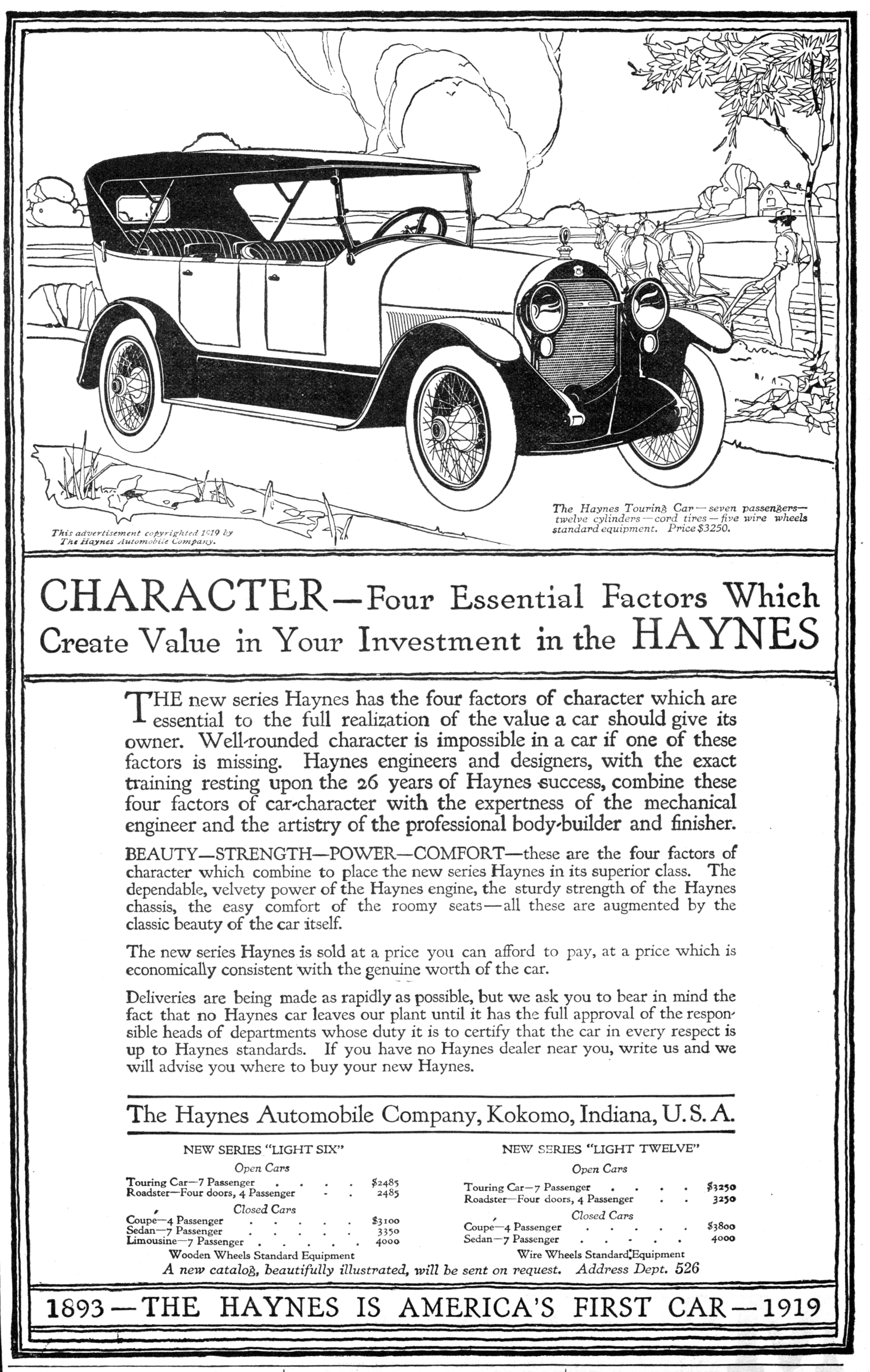
A 1919 Haynes Automobile Company advertisement

Haynes' Model L was his most popular vehicle. First designed in 1905, the three-speed car could travel at 35 mph (56 km/h) and carry four passengers; the company sold over 4,300. Haynes expanded the company significantly in 1908 to accommodate ever-increasing sales. More stock was issued and more capital raised to build a new and larger factory. By 1909 the company was producing 650 cars annually with models priced between $2,500 and $5,500. In 1910, Haynes Auto became the first company to build a car with a roof, windshield, headlights, and a speedometer as standard on each vehicle to continue their goal of producing the best luxury vehicles.

More than 1,000 autos were built by Haynes Automobile Company in 1910 and the company continued to experience growth, until a devastating fire swept the company factory in 1911 and killed one employee. Recovery from the blaze was slow, and it was not until 1913 that the company was able to resume its growth. To continue the promotion of his cars, Haynes organized a trip in which he crossed the country by automobile in 1914. The trip gained considerable attention from the press and gave his company publicity and a much needed sales boost in the wake of the fire. Almost every town he visited printed newspaper stories on his invention and many hailed him as the "Father of the Automobile".

=== Haynes Stellite Company ===
Haynes continued his research into ways to produce corrosion resistant metals. While working on alloys for use in spark plugs, he created a metal he named stellite. Realizing the value of his discovery, he patented his first version in 1907. The metal was very resistant to corrosion and had immediate application in tool making and numerous other implementations. He continued to experiment with it until 1910 when he published his findings in a paper to the International Congress of Applied Chemistry and the American Institute of Metals, where he held memberships. His final version was completed in 1912 and his patent issued on June 20.

He applied for another patent on an alloy he called stainless steel, now known as martensitic stainless steel. The Patent Office rejected his application saying that it was not a new alloy. Haynes conceded their point, but submitted a second application and supplied a sample showing the stainlessness of his alloy when created using his exact proportions of metals, and it was granted. At the urging of his wife, he created the first set of stainless steel silverware for her personal use. The first piece of stainless steel was forged by Homer Dan Farmer in Haynes laboratory. It was a large meat knife and was donated to the Haynes Museum by the family of Dan Heflin, grandson of Homer Dan Farmer. In later years he claimed to have created stainless steel because she did not enjoy polishing their silver tableware. British metallurgist Harry Brearley independently produced an identical alloy around the same time and applied for an American patent and found that one already existed. Brearley had also created other innovations for the metal, but they were of little value without the stainless steel patent. He sought out Haynes and the two decided to pool their findings in a single company to produce the alloy. Haynes sold his stainless steel patent in 1918 to the American Stainless Steel Company, a company Brearley had created with the assistance of investors in Pennsylvania. In exchange he and his estate received royalties on its production until the patent expired in 1930. The stock he received as payment allowed him to gain a seat among the company's board of directors and he installed his son, March, to represent him. The income from the transaction led Haynes to begin the accumulation of a large fortune.

Seeing stellite as a far more valuable metal, he decided to keep its patent for himself and founded the Haynes Stellite Company in Kokomo to produce the metal in September 1912. Many of his initial requests for the metal were from medical tool manufacturers who saw the alloy as the best for surgical tools. Because his company could not produce enough of the metal to satisfy demand, Haynes issued licenses to several companies in the United States, Canada, and Europe to produce the alloy and pay him royalties. Haynes strictly controlled production, and did not permit the other licensees to sell stellite in its raw form, but to only sell it as specific finished products. In that way, he remained the only vendor who could sell sheets of the metal. As World War I broke out, his company received large government contracts for use of the material. Stellite was found to have excellent applications in airplanes, and because it was non-corrosive and could protect its contents indefinitely, it proved to be the best metal available for ammunition casing. In 1916 alone, the company registered $1.3 million in sales. The rapid growth of the business made Haynes increasingly wealthy and he became a millionaire that year. Despite his large income, he refused to provide his employees a year-end bonus, causing a significant stir in the factory. When a foreman demanded to know the reason that their wages were not raised, he told him, "It doesn't pay to give the working man too much money—it makes him too independent." His statement was widely repeated and, although he claimed to have made it in jest, it alienated a large part of his workforce and began a period of labor problems.

After the war, Haynes Stellite moved to producing tableware, jewelry, and pocket knives. The employees of the company unionized and began to demand wage increases beyond what Haynes believed was fair. The threat of labor strikes and Haynes' desire to avoid the problem led him to sell the company to Union Carbide on April 10, 1920, in exchange for 25,000 shares of Union Carbide stock valued at $2 million. He later made an additional half million from dividends. Other details of the deal were never made public, and Haynes may have made as much $4 million on the sale. After a series of owners, the company is now called Haynes International and is again independent.

== Later life ==
=== Prohibition ===
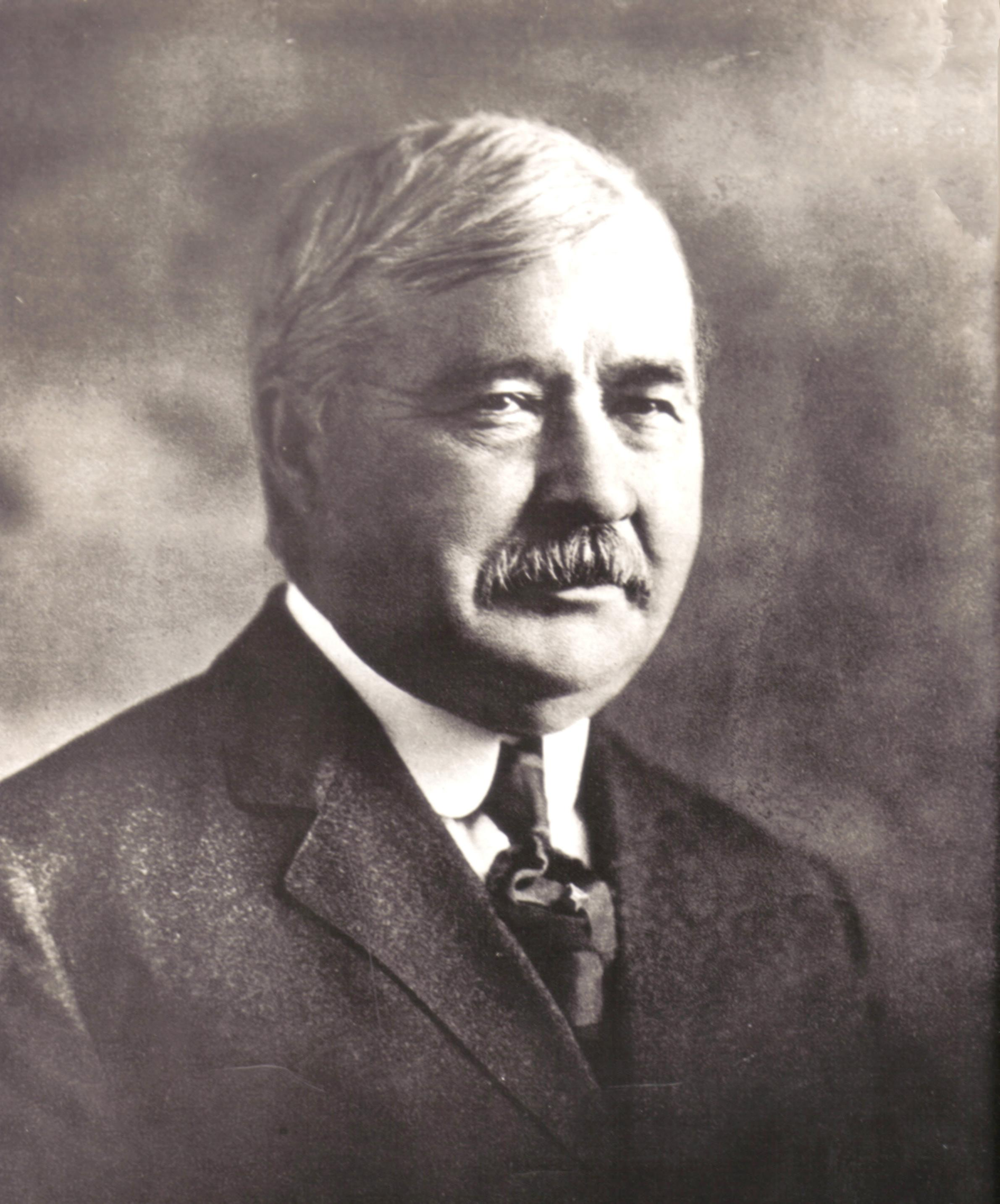
Elwood Haynes, c. 1919

Haynes was an avid supporter of prohibition and spoke several times on behalf of prohibitionist leader Frank Hanly, lending him both personal and financial support. Hanly advocated the passage of a local option law that allowed most of Indiana to ban liquor sales in 1909. He continued in his support of the Prohibition Party and donated it thousands of dollars and an automobile nicknamed the "Prohibition Flyer". He became increasingly involved in the organization and in 1916 he ran for the United States Senate on the prohibition ticket, making many speeches and stumping across the state. He was overwhelmingly defeated, receiving only 15,598 votes out of nearly one million cast. Harry Stewart New, the Republican candidate narrowly won the election by plurality, and Haynes was accused of costing Incumbent Democratic Senator John W. Kern's re-election. Despite his personal electoral failure, liquor sales were completely banned in Indiana by a 1918 law that went into effect in 1919. With his goals achieved, Haynes switched to join the Republican Party, but was significantly less active in politics thereafter.

Although Haynes was a prohibitionist, he was a critic of the Indiana Branch of the Ku Klux Klan, which was in the height of its power during the 1910s and 1920s. In letters to friends and fellow prohibitionists, he ridiculed the organization for using violent and illegal tactics to achieve prohibition, and accused them of hypocrisy for supporting many anti-prohibition Democratic politicians. Kokomo politics was dominated by the Klan during that period and it is unknown if Haynes spoke publicly against the organization.

=== Philanthropy ===
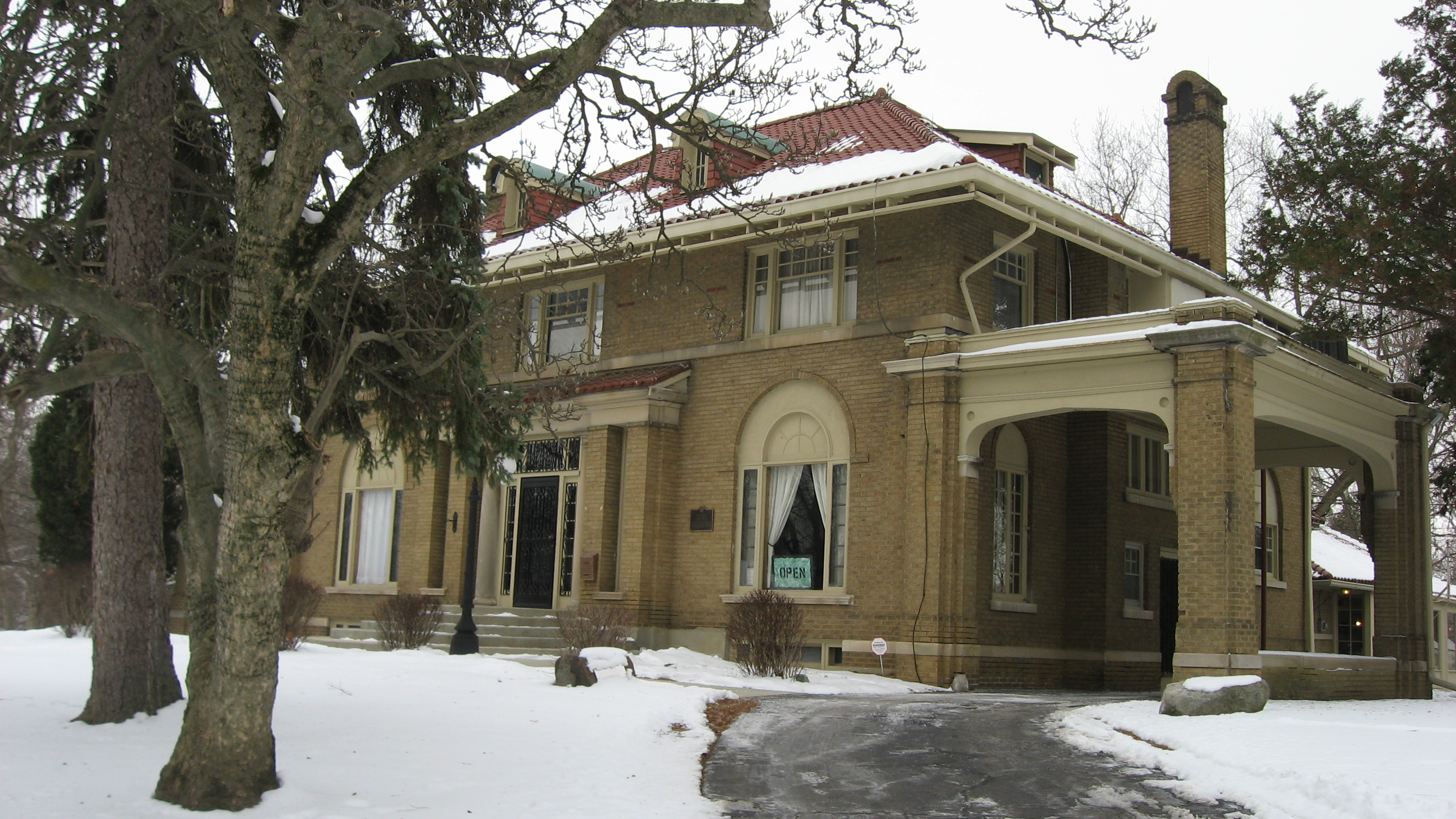
Haynes' Kokomo home

Haynes purchased a new home on Webster Street in Kokomo in 1915. The home, known as the Haynes Mansion, was large enough to house a personal laboratory for Haynes to work in. As he grew older and became less involved in his businesses, Haynes became increasingly philanthropic. He made regular large donations to the Presbyterian church and became a patron of the Worcester Institute he had attended, providing scholarships and donating funds for expansion.

He funded the formation of a Young Men's Christian Association in Kokomo where he and his son became active. Haynes taught swimming classes and regularly took underprivileged young boys to movies and bought them dinners. After several years of active membership at the local level, he was elected president of the national YMCA in 1919 and served two one-year terms. His primary focus during his tenure was the launching of several successful membership drives. In 1920, he was appointed to the Indiana State Board of Education by Governor James P. Goodrich where he advocated increased state funding for vocational education.

The United States economy went into a recession in the early 1920s and automobile sales decreased. Coupled with increasing competition, Haynes Automobile Company began running into debt problems. Haynes had to use his personal savings to rescue the company in 1921 and pay off some outstanding accounts. A bond drive was launched to raise $1 million to help fund the company through the period, but it fell significantly short of raising enough money. Haynes was the primary purchaser of the bonds. Unlike the other large auto companies like Ford and General Motors, Haynes Auto did not have the widespread dealership agreements that were able to sustain their companies through the hard times; his company relied on customer's ordering directly from the factory. Haynes Auto sales quickly began to slip from a peak of nearly 6,000 cars sold in 1922. In 1923 sales dropped to 4,300, and 1,500 in 1924. The situation continued to be bleak for the company, and it was forced to declare bankruptcy in October 1924. Haynes sought a merger with multiple other auto companies, including Henry Ford, but partners were not forthcoming and Haynes was forced to agree to a liquidation in 1925. He was held personally responsible for about $95,000 of the company's debt. In addition, he lost $335,700 in stock he held in the company and a substantial amount in investment bonds. In total, the loss cost Haynes an estimated quarter of his net worth.

=== Death and legacy ===
On January 6, 1925, Haynes, the Apperson brothers, and other automotive pioneers were awarded gold medals by the National Automobile Chamber of Commerce at a New York City auto exhibition for their contributions to the industry. On his return trip home, he contracted influenza and his health began to deteriorate rapidly. In March, he asked his son to take over his business interests while he traveled to Florida to seek rest in the warmer climate. His condition steadily worsened, causing him to cancel his planned trip to Cuba and return to Kokomo. He remained in his home, attended by his personal physician and a nurse until his death from congestive heart failure on April 13, 1925. Haynes' funeral was held in Kokomo before his interment at the city's Memorial Park cemetery.

Haynes' fortune had shrunk considerably with the collapse of his auto company. He still held an estimated $2.85 million ($35 million in 2009 chained dollars) in stocks, bonds, and other assets, but almost all of his cash savings were gone. He had already been forced to borrow money using future dividends and royalties as collateral, leaving his family with some difficulty in coming up with funds to maintain his home. Haynes' estate was left to his wife who continued to live in the family mansion until her own death from a stroke in August 1933. The family assets were distributed between Bernice and March who separately oversaw their portion of the family's interests. March inherited the family mansion, but sold it in 1957 to Martin J. Caserio, General Manager of the Delco Electronics Division of the General Motors Company who lived there until he was transferred to Detroit in 1964. General Motors purchased the house from Caserio at that time so that he could purchase a home in Detroit. GM maintained ownership for about a year (it was vacant) and then sold the mansion in 1965 to Bernice, who donated it to the city of Kokomo. The city converted it into the Elwood Haynes Museum and it has been open to the public since 1967. In January 1944 the SS Elwood Haynes, a Liberty Ship built during World War II, was named in Haynes' honor.

Haynes is remembered as a pioneer of the American automobile, and as the creator of the first automobile design viable for mass production. He is credited as being one of those primarily responsible for the rapid growth of the natural gas industry in Indiana, a boom that made northern Indiana one of the leading industrial regions of the United States. He is also remembered for his development of stainless steel and stellite, materials that are commonly used across the world today. Stellite remains an important metal, as its ability to withstand high temperatures has made it a component in American spacecraft. In July 2015, he was inducted into the 75th class of the Automotive Hall of Fame in Detroit, Michigan.

Haynes was the grandfather of Margaret Hillis, founder and director of the Chicago Symphony Chorus, and Elwood Hillis, an eight-term Congressman representing Indiana's 5th District.

== See also ==
- Elwood Haynes Museum
- History of the automobile
- Charles Duryea, also credited with first gasoline auto
