= Haynes International =

Producer of corrosion-resistant and high-temperature alloys

Haynes International, Inc.
- Type: Subsidiary
- Industry: Metal
- Founded: 1912; 114 years ago
- Founder: Elwood Haynes
- Headquarters: Kokomo, Indiana
- Key people: Mike Shor, president & CEO Robert H. Getz chairman of the board
- Products: Corrosion-Resistant Alloys; High-Temperature Alloys
- Production output: 18.4 million pounds (2018)
- Revenue: ▲$490 million (FY 2019)
- Net income: ▲$9 million (FY 2019)
- Total assets: ▲$593 million (FY 2019)
- Total equity: ▼$296 million (FY 2019)
- Number of employees: 1,179 (2019)
- Parent: Acerinox
- Website: haynesintl.com

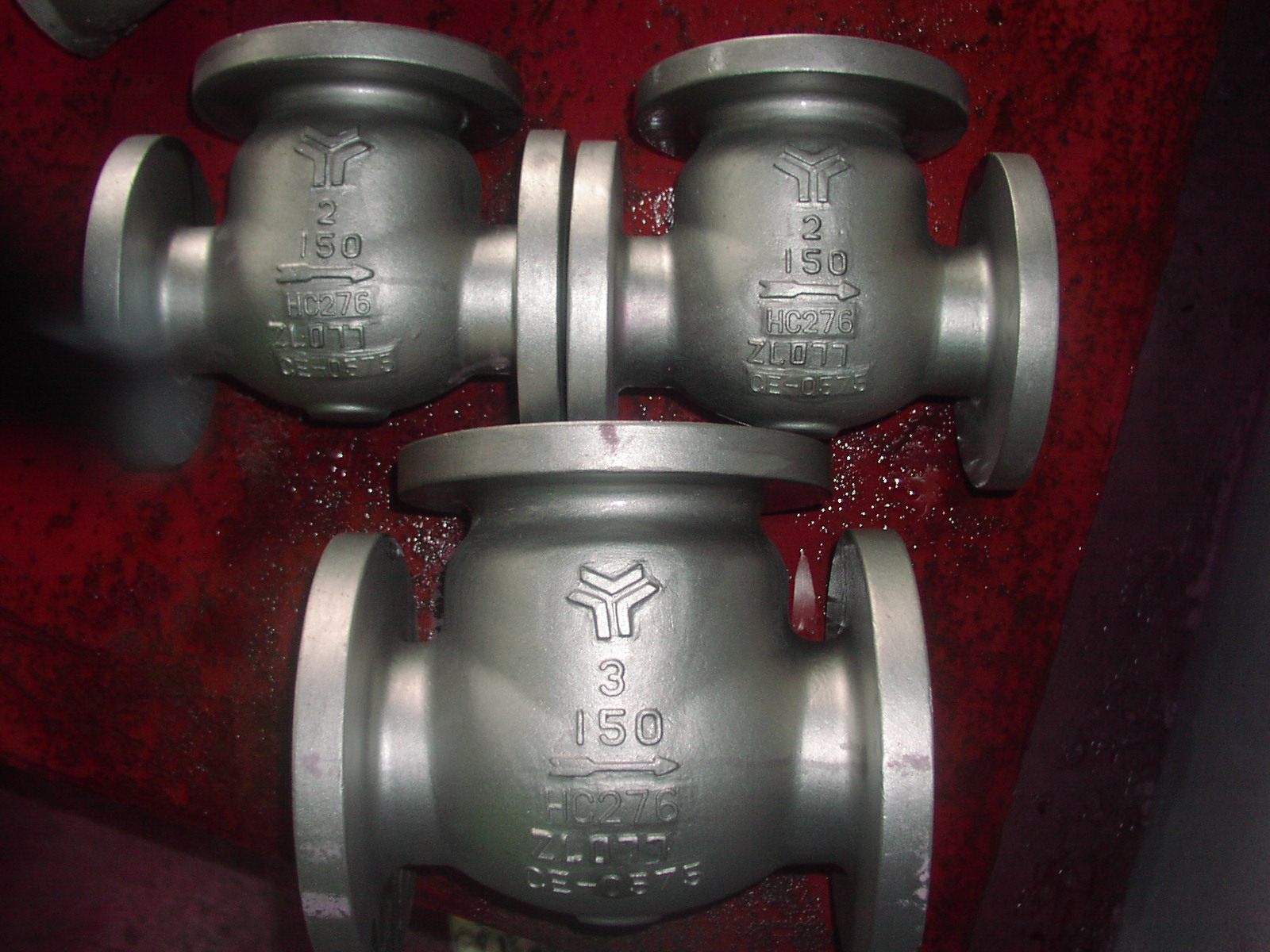
Three check valves in corrosion-resistant Hastelloy

Haynes International, Inc., a subsidiary of Acerinox headquartered in Kokomo, Indiana, is one of the largest producers of corrosion-resistant and high-temperature alloys. In addition to Kokomo, Haynes has manufacturing facilities in Arcadia, Louisiana, Laporte, Indiana, and Mountain Home, North Carolina. The Kokomo facility specializes in flat products, the Arcadia facility in tubular products, and the Mountain Home facility in wire products. In fiscal year 2018, the company's revenues were derived from the aerospace (52.1%), chemical processing (18.2%), industrial gas turbine (12.0%) and other (12.3%) industries. The company's alloys are primarily marketed under the Hastelloy and the Haynes brands. They are based on nickel, but also include cobalt, chromium, molybdenum, tungsten, iron, silicon, manganese, carbon, aluminium, and/or titanium.

== History ==
The company was founded by Elwood Haynes in 1912 in Kokomo, Indiana, as Haynes Stellite Works. The same year Haynes was awarded two more patents for the more advanced versions of Stellite, which he had originally patented in 1907.

In 1915, Elwood Haynes and two local businessmen, Richard Ruddell and James C. Patten, incorporate the business as Haynes Stellite Company.

In 1920, the company was acquired by Union Carbide.

In 1922, the company invented its first alloy under the Hastelloy brand, derived from the words "Haynes Stellite Alloy".

In 1927, Charles Lindbergh's aircraft, the Spirit of St. Louis, which included hard-surfaced engine valves manufactured by Haynes, crossed the Atlantic Ocean.

In 1970, Cabot Corporation purchased the company.

In 1989, the investment banking firm of Morgan, Lewis, Githens, and Ahn purchased the company.

In 1997, the Blackstone Group purchased the company. The debt incurred ultimately forced Haynes into bankruptcy in March 2004, from which it emerged 5 months later in August 2004.

In 1999, the company opened an office in Singapore, its first sales office in Asia.

In 2004, the company acquired Branford Wire & Manufacturing of Mountain Home, North Carolina.

In March 2007, Haynes became a public company via an initial public offering.

The Space Shuttle program, which ended in 2011, used a total of 47 parts made from Haynes 188 alloy and 7 from Haynes' Hastelloy B alloy in its engines. Hastelloy C-22 alloy was used for the fuel line bellows that assisted in achieving takeoff.

In 2015, the company acquired Leveltek Processing.

In 2016, the company expanded its operations in LaPorte, Indiana. The expansion created 52 jobs.

In 2018, chairman Michael Shor became President and chief executive officer of the company and Robert H. Getz became Chairman of the Board.

In 2024, the company was acquired by Acerinox.
