= Strob Saw Blade =

Type of circular saw blade

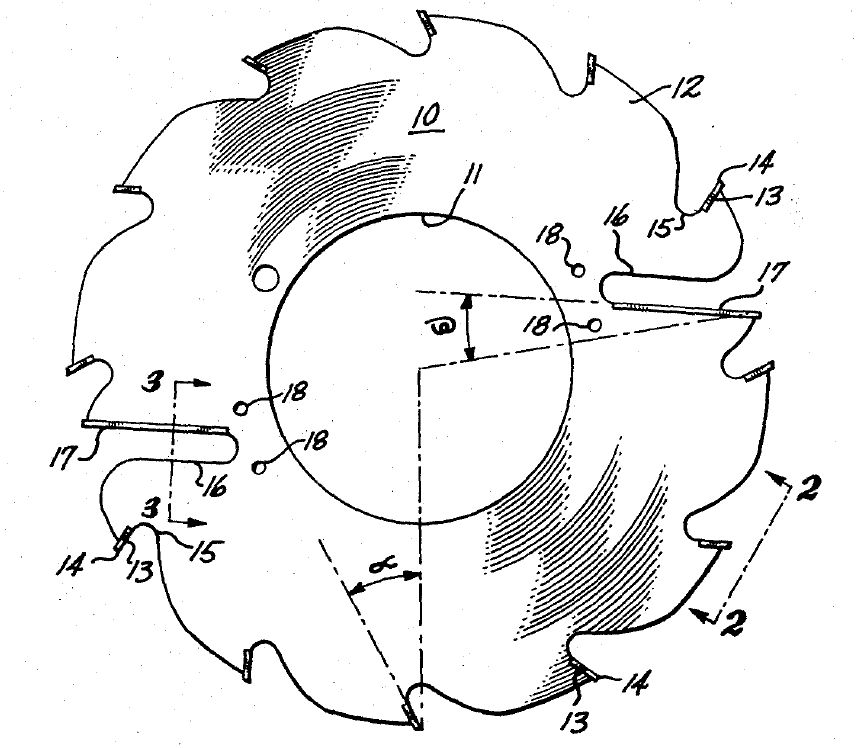
Strob Saw Blade as depicted in Strobel's original patent application. The Strob rakers are numbered '17' in the diagram

Strob Saw Blades are circular saw blades with the addition of two or more specialised raker/cutters and were invented by Keene S. Strobel (1907–1989) of Everett and Peter E. Heiser of Issaquah. These rakers are fitted on the trailing edges of more-or-less radial slots cut in the blade and are designed to reduce friction and rapidly eject sawdust, thereby preventing scorching and distortion of the blade faces, improving cutting efficiency and reducing sharpening frequency. Weyerhaeuser were granted a patent on strob saw blades in 1971, but there has been little improvement in the design since then.

The Strob inserts or rakers, have cutting edges which extend outside the two plane surfaces of the blade, but fractionally less than the kerf. These rakers have some important advantages, primarily the ease with which they saw through green or uncured wood which would otherwise jam the saw blade. Strob rakers are made from hard metals such as tungsten carbide, cobalt-steel alloy, or Stellite.
