= Haynes-Apperson =

Defunct American motor vehicle manufacturer

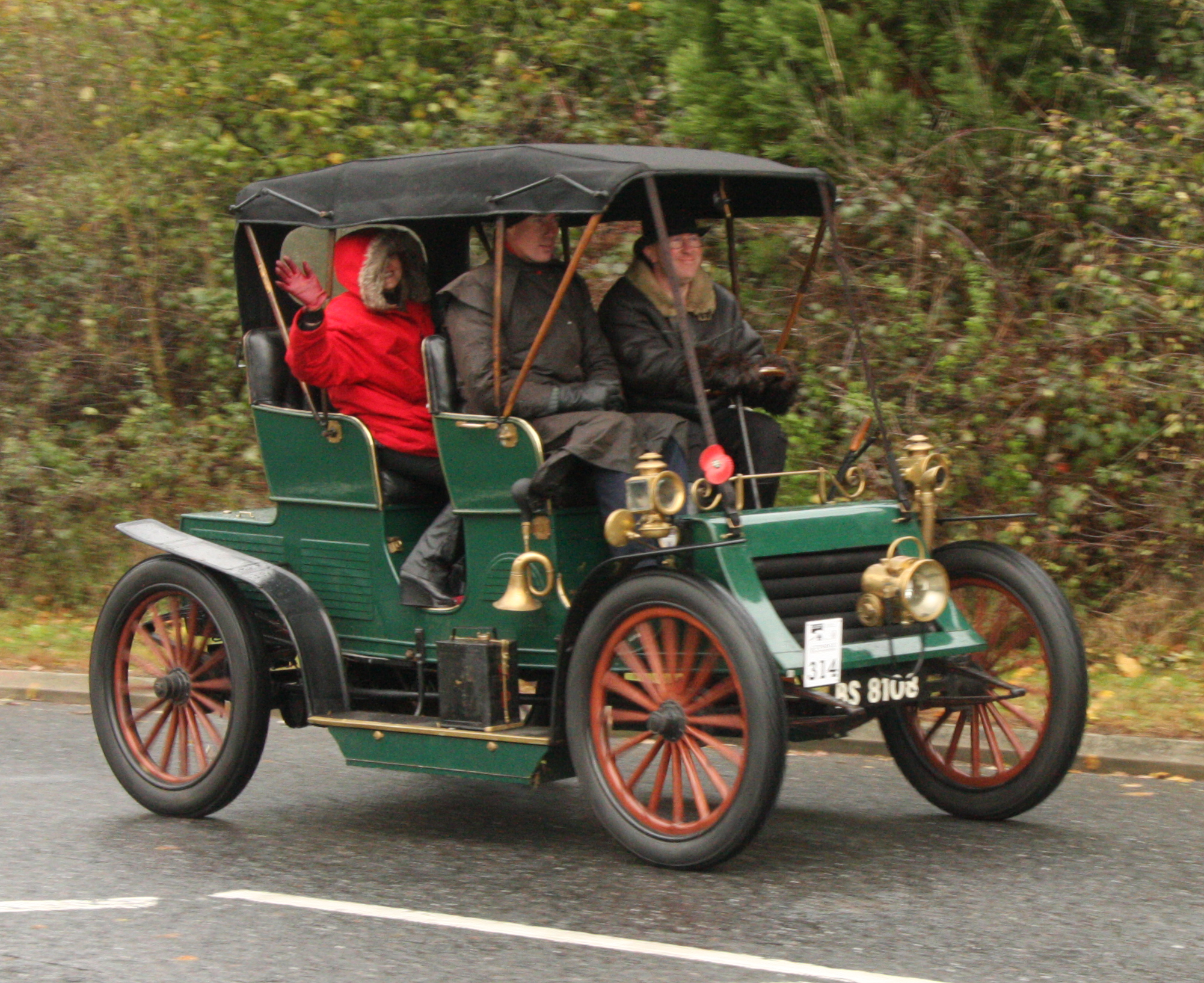
1902 phaeton

Haynes-Apperson Company was a manufacturer of Brass Era automobiles in Kokomo, Indiana, from 1893/1894 to 1905. It was the first automobile manufacturer in Indiana, and among the first in the United States. Elwood Haynes, one of the founders, worked on early types of stainless steel and was the inventor of stellite, and many of the early advances in automobile technology were first invented by the company.

== History ==
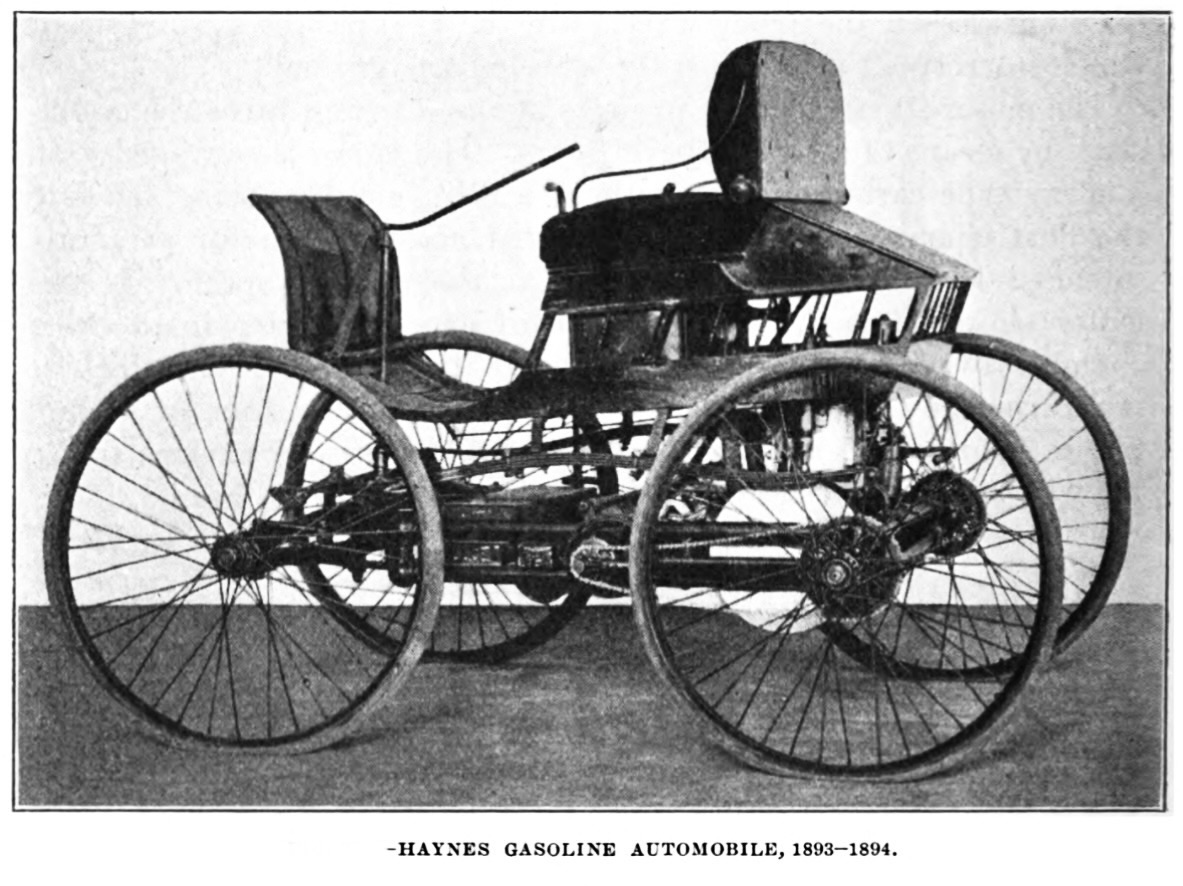
Haynes-Apperson (1893–1894)

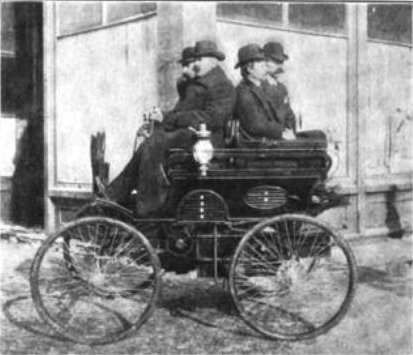
1894 Haynes-Apperson

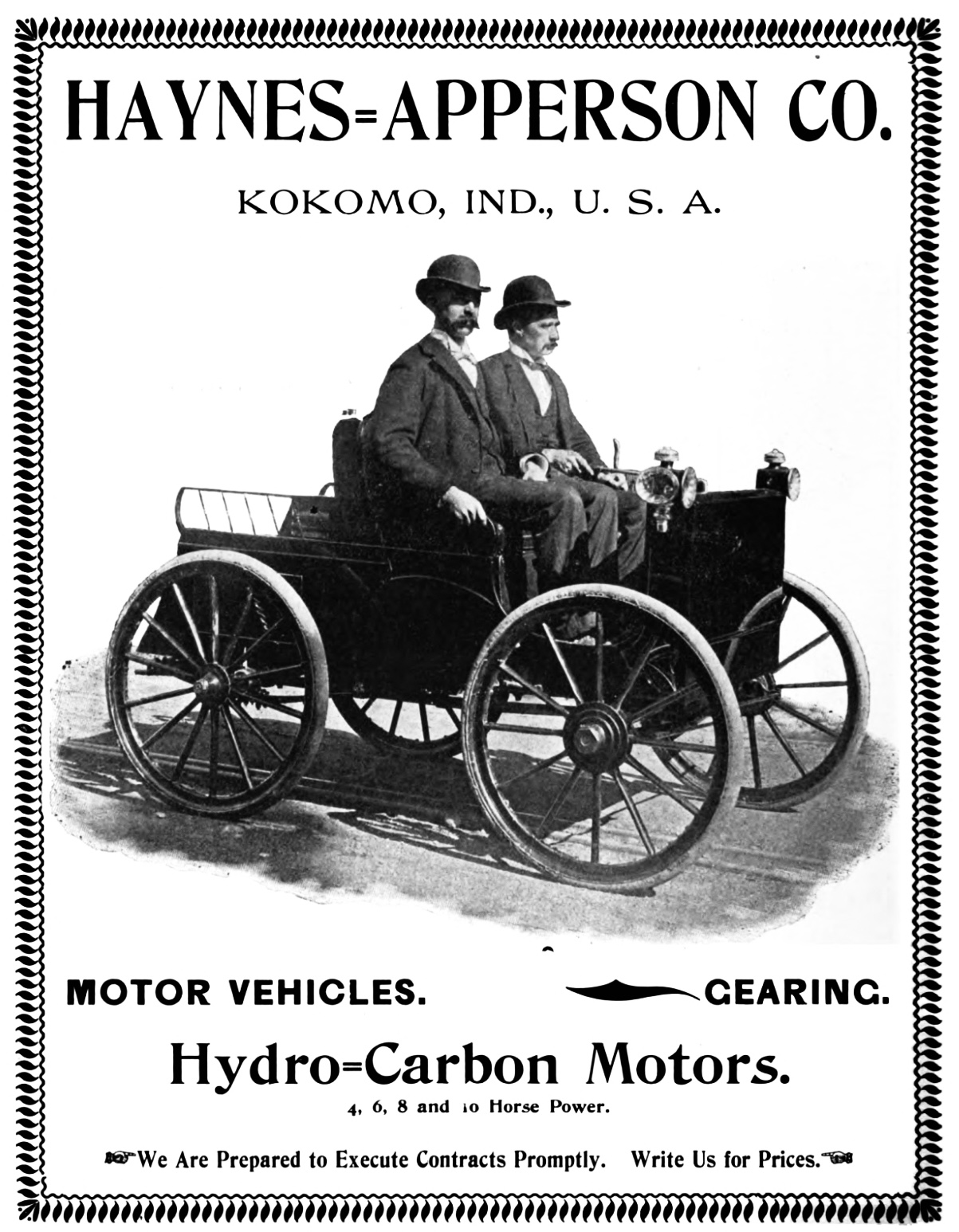
Haynes-Apperson (1897).

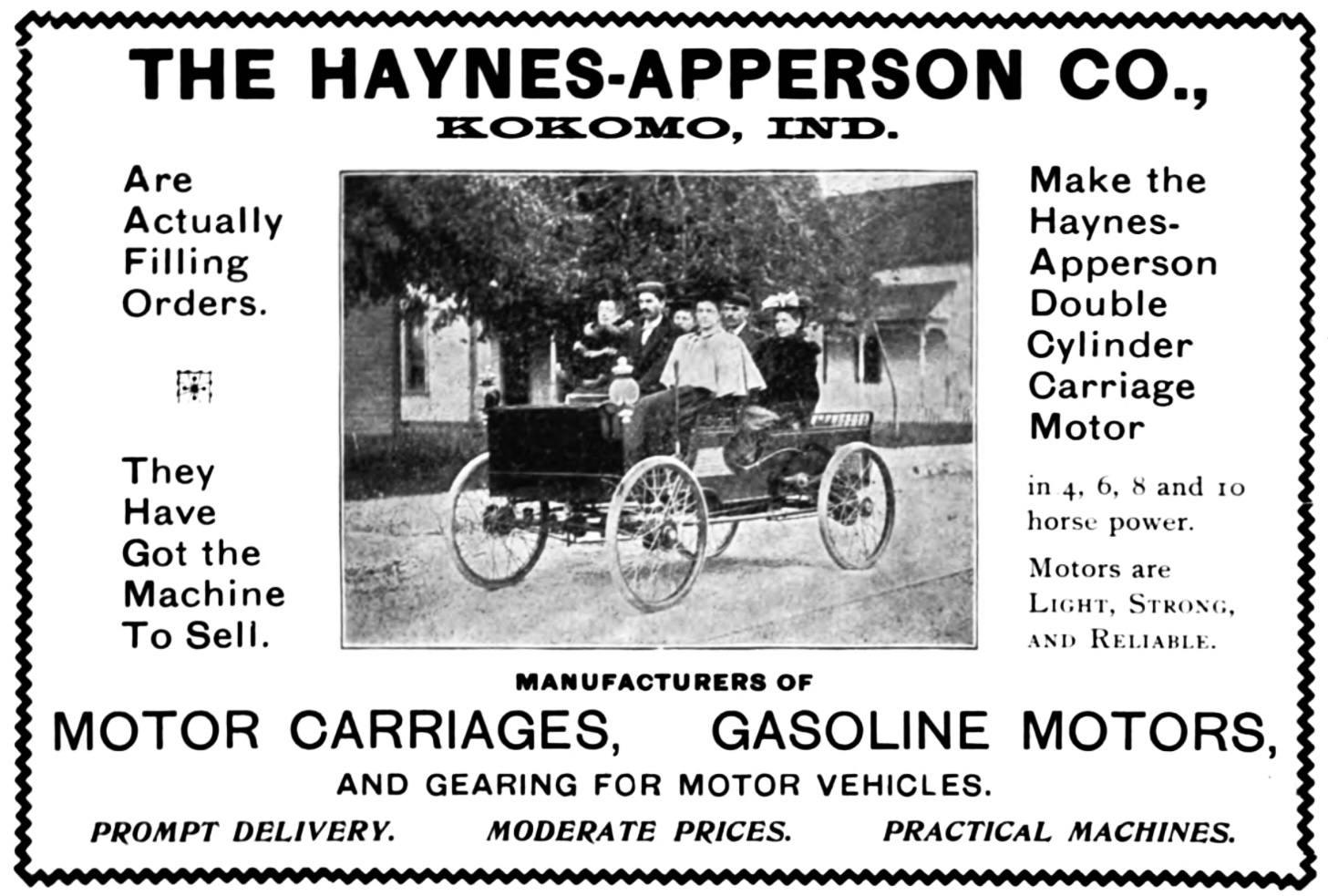
Haynes-Apperson (1897).

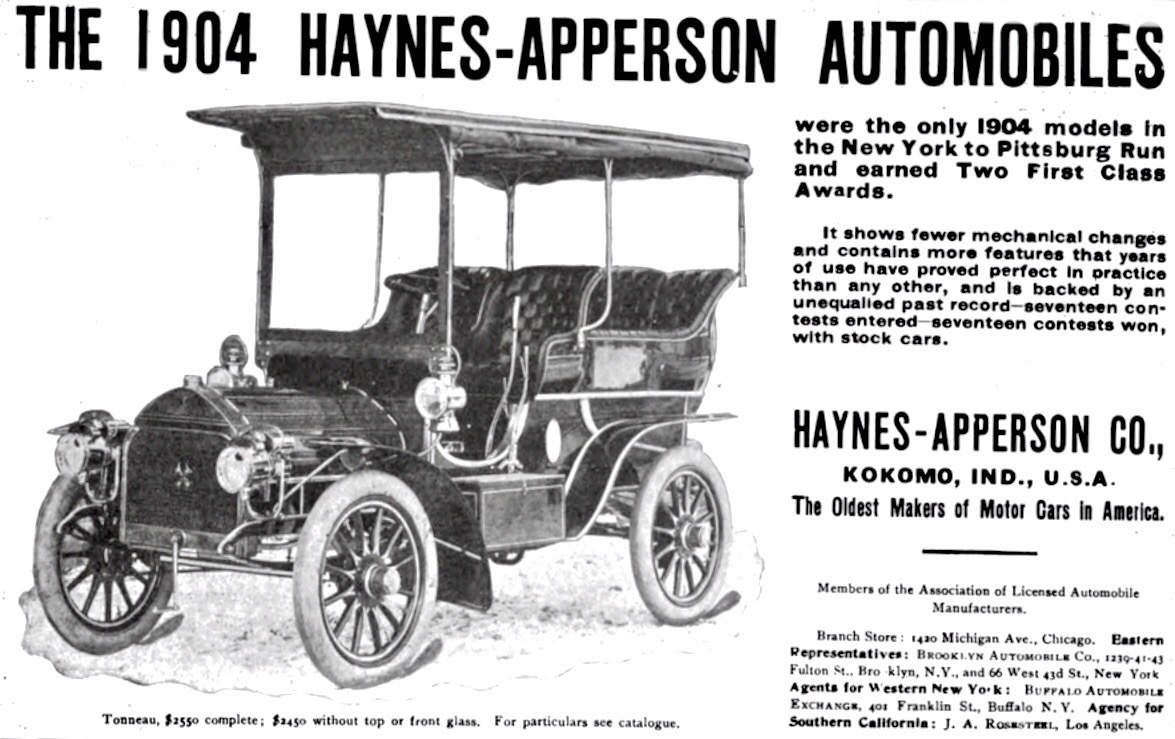
Haynes-Apperson advertisement, 1904

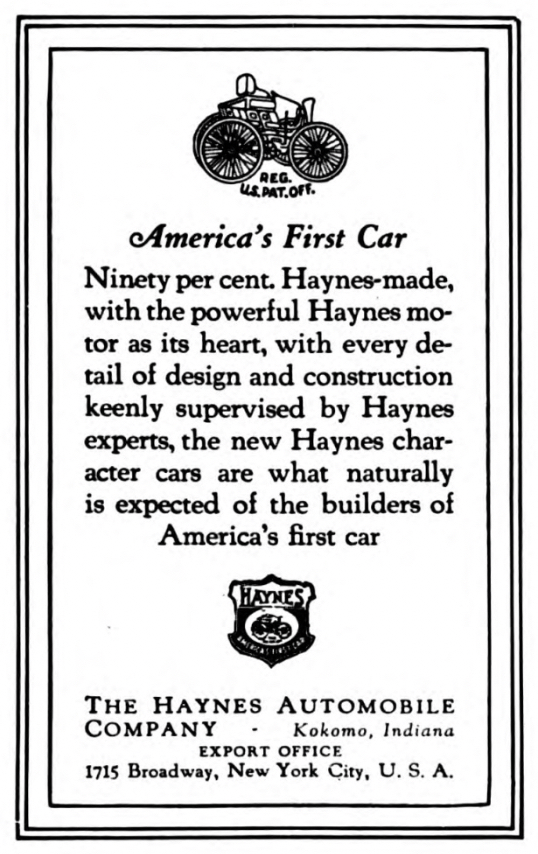
Haynes advertisement (1921)

The company was founded by Elwood Haynes and brothers Elmer and Edgar Apperson. In 1893/1894, the trio built one of the first gasoline powered vehicles in the United States, at Apperson's Riverside Machine Works. By 1898 the company was producing one new car every two to three weeks, and selling early models for $2,000 (USD). At the end of that year, they relocated the company to a large factory where they designed two additional models. They brought on a larger workforce and increased the production rate to between two and three new cars each (year). From there business began to boom, five cars in 1898, thirty 1899, 192 in 1900 and 240 in 1901. Production increases kept the factory open 24 hours a day, and two shifts of workers were needed to keep the factory running at capacity.

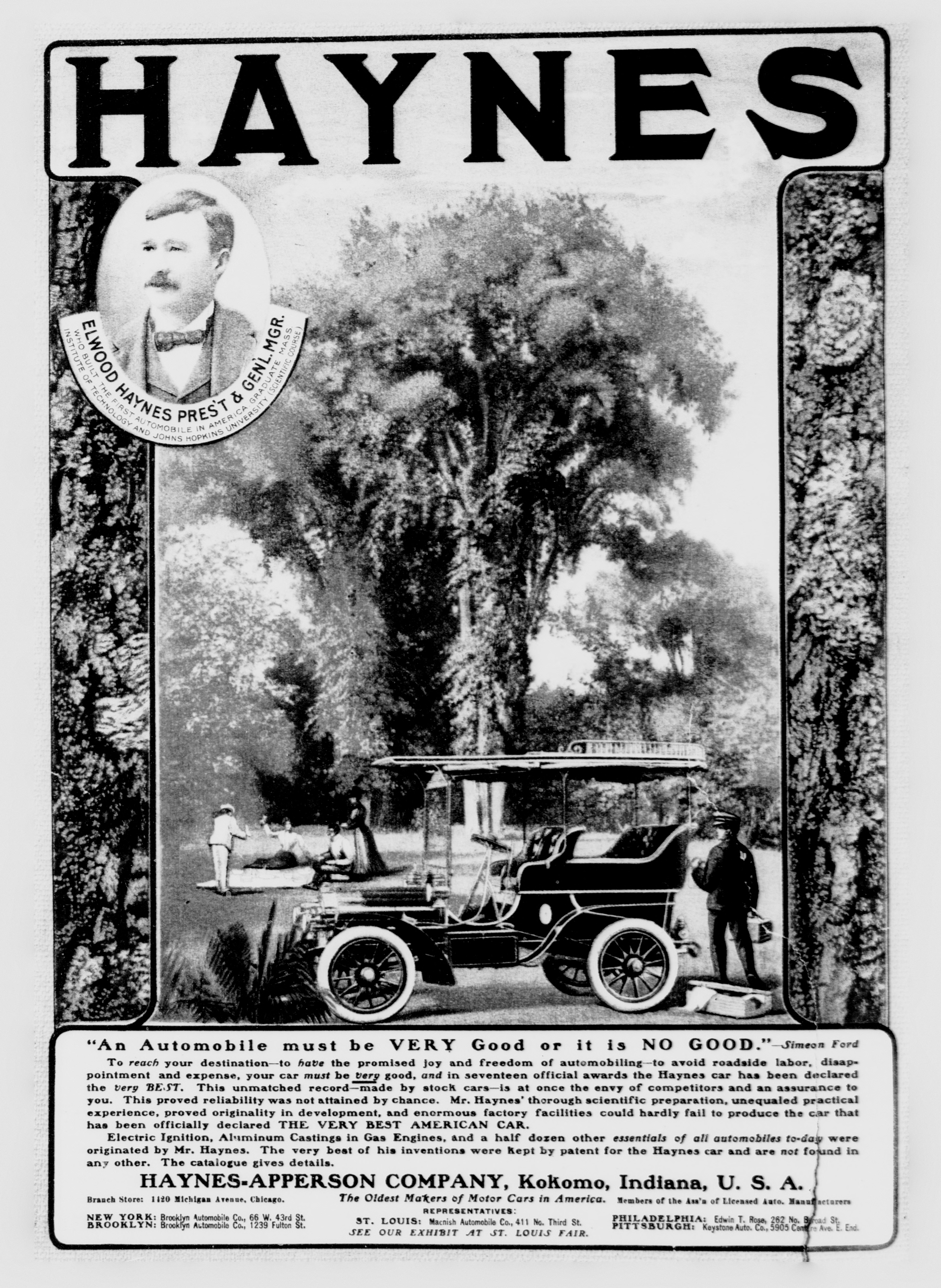
1904 newspaper advertisement

Haynes-Apperson automobiles were known for their "long distance running" capability. The company regularly competed their cars in endurance races. A Haynes-Apperson was among the cars entered in the first automobile race in America, the Chicago Times-Herald race from Chicago and Evanston, Illinois, in 1895. The last model designed by the company had a three-speed transmission and was capable of 24 mph on pneumatic tires. In 1902, the brothers had turned a large profit from the enterprise and they decided to split up to form their own companies. The Apperson automobile company was formed that year, and in 1905, Haynes-Apperson was renamed the Haynes Automobile Company.

The 1904 Haynes-Apperson Light Car was a runabout seating two passengers, selling for $1,550. The horizontal-mounted water-cooled flat twin, situated at the rear of the car, produced 11 hp (8.2 kW). A 3-speed transmission was fitted, and the car used an angle iron frame. The Tonneau had a similar flat-twin of 17 hp (12.7 kW), situated at the front of the car, and three-speed transmission was fitted. The angle iron-framed car weighed 2300 lb (1043 kg), seated five, and sold for $2,500.

An 1894 Haynes is in the permanent collection of the Smithsonian Institution's National Museum of American History.

== Production models ==
- Haynes-Apperson Two Passenger Touring Car
- Haynes-Apperson Light Touring Car
- Haynes-Apperson Four Cylinder

== Commemorative festival ==
Since 1977 a race in Kokomo, Indiana, for runners and walkers has been held during the "Haynes-Apperson Festival" in commemoration of the pioneer auto company.

== See also ==
- Duryea brothers, makers of the first American automobile
- Ransom Olds, maker of early production American automobile
