= Haynes Automobile Company =

Defunct American motor vehicle manufacturer

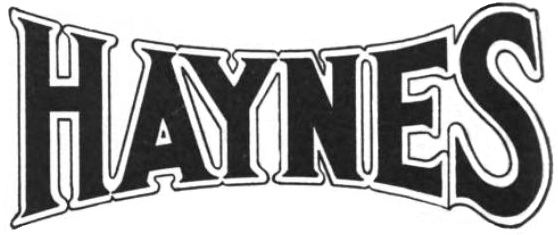
- Type: Automobile Manufacturing
- Industry: Automotive
- Genre: Sedan, coupe and roadster
- Founded: 1905
- Founder: Edgar Apperson, Elmer Apperson and Elwood Haynes
- Defunct: 1924
- Headquarters: Kokomo, Indiana, United States
- Area served: United States
- Products: Automobiles; Automotive parts

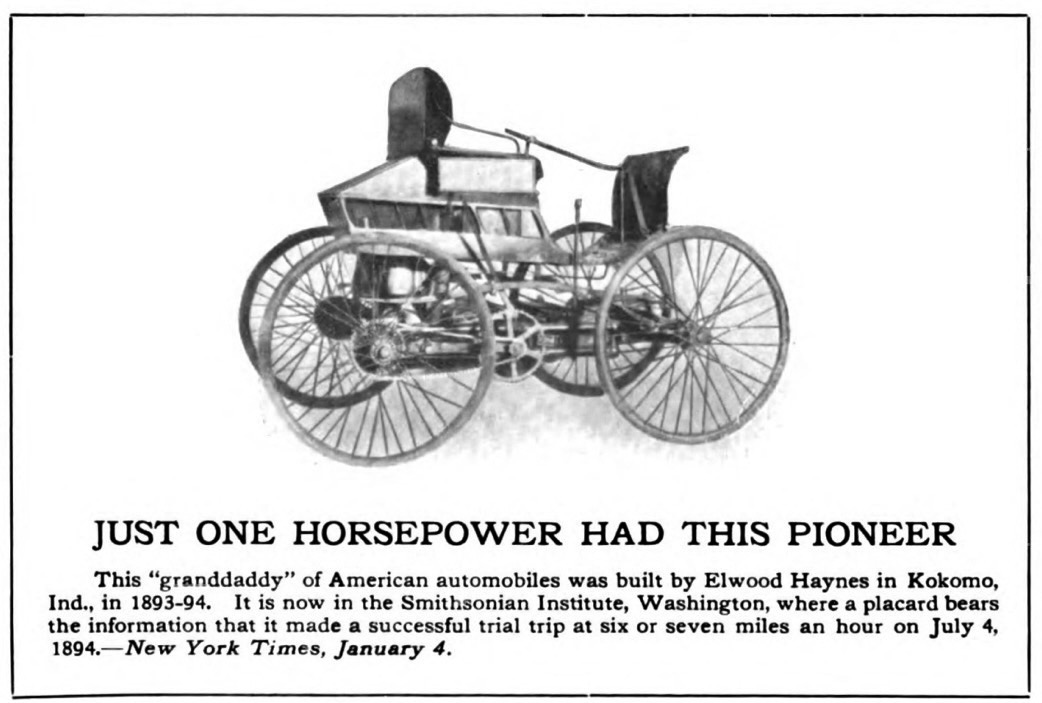
Haynes Model "America's First Car" (1894)

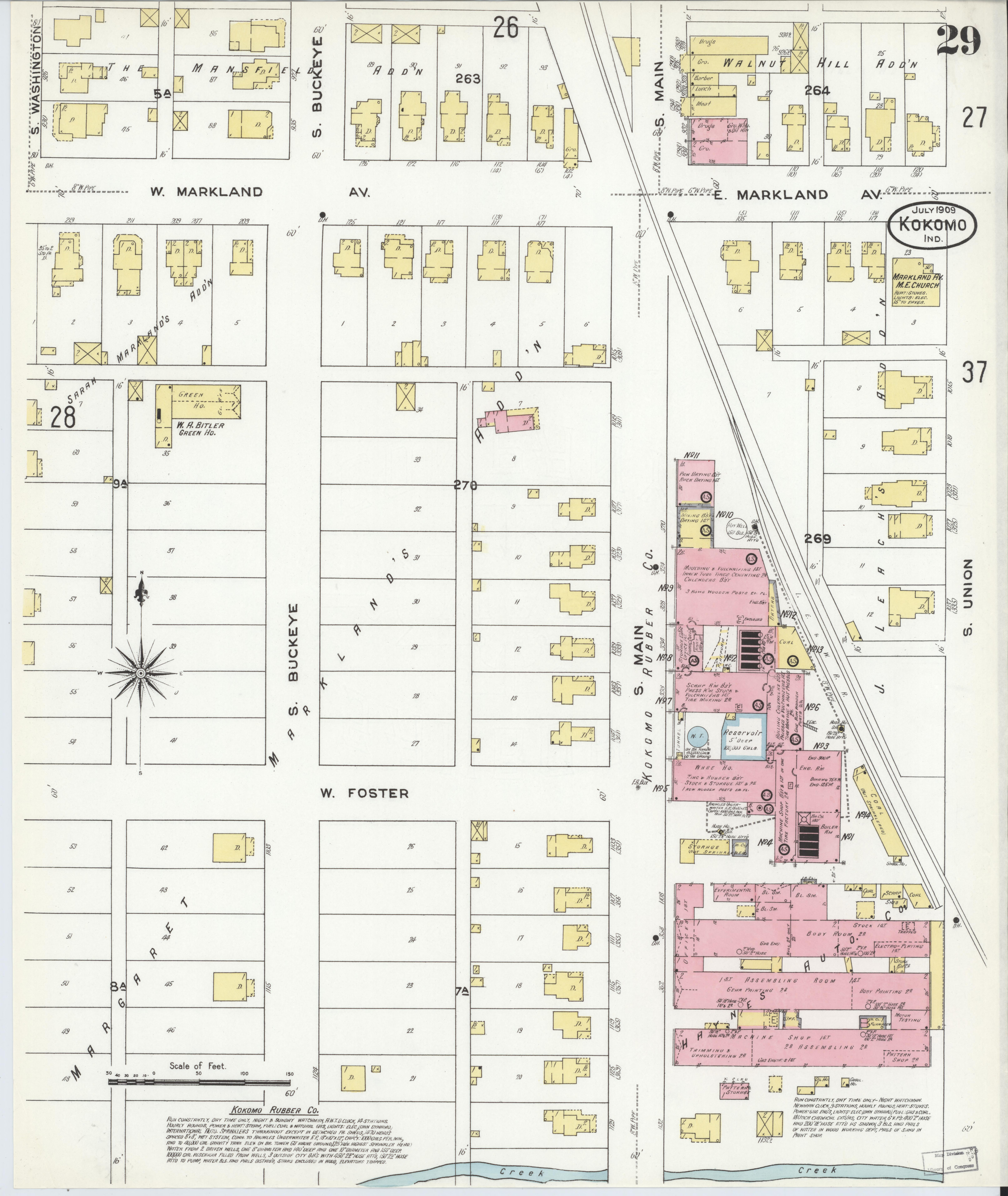
Haynes plant (1909)

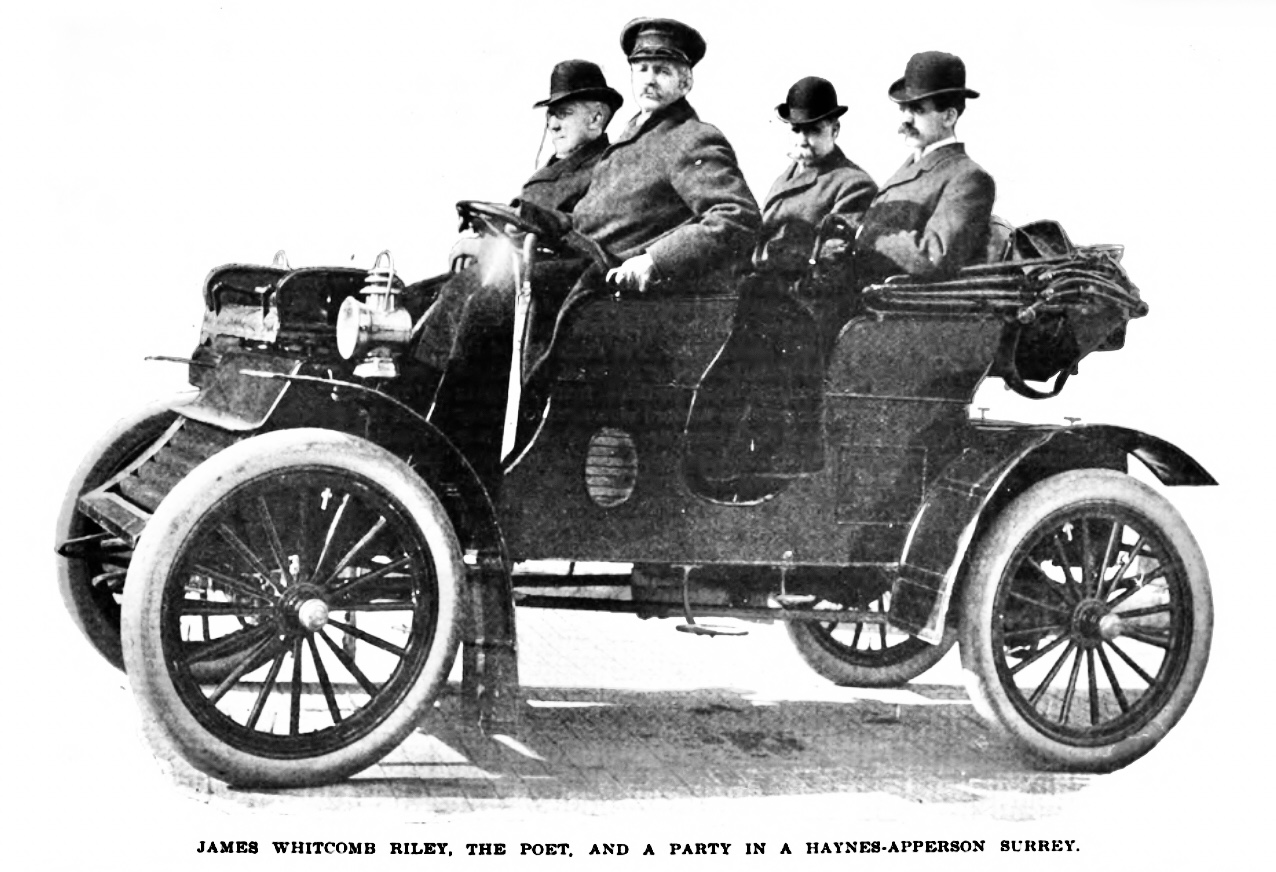
Haynes-Apperson 12HP Surrey (1902–1903) with James Whitcomb Riley on the wheel

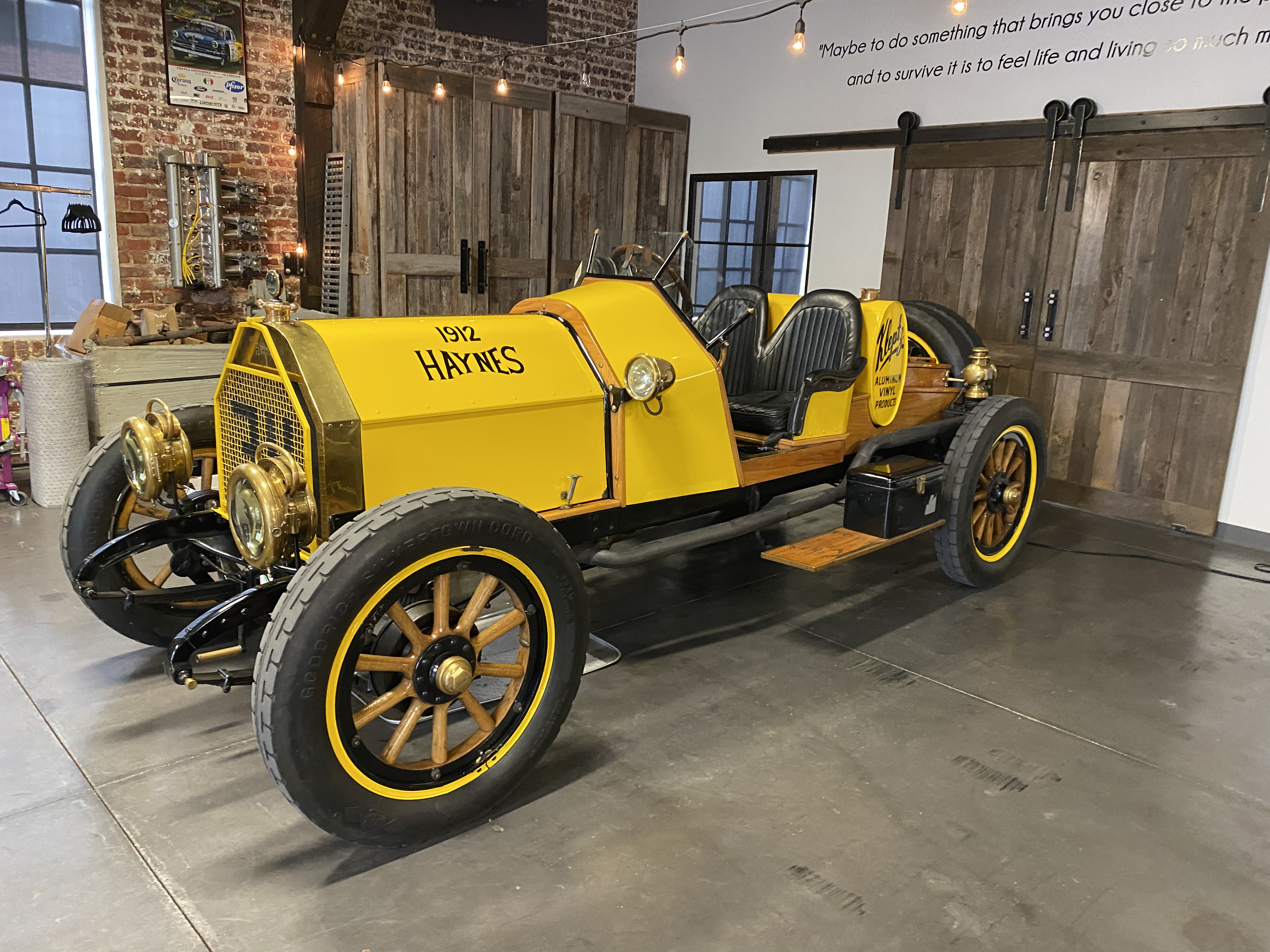
1912 Haynes Model 20 Speedster

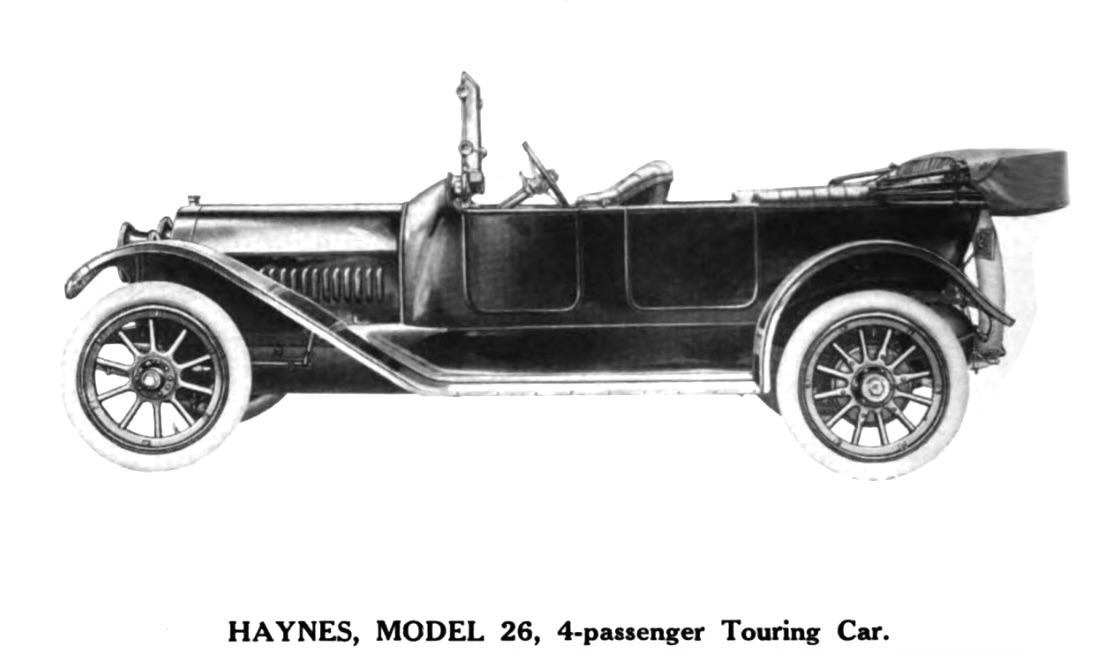
Haynes Model 26 (1913–1914)

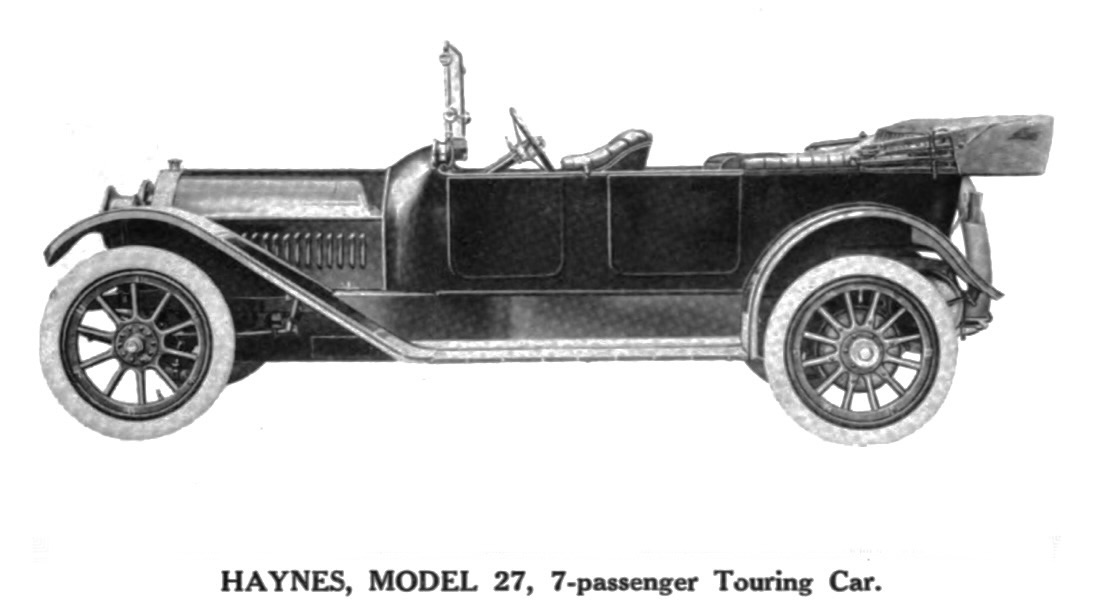
Haynes Model 27 (1914)

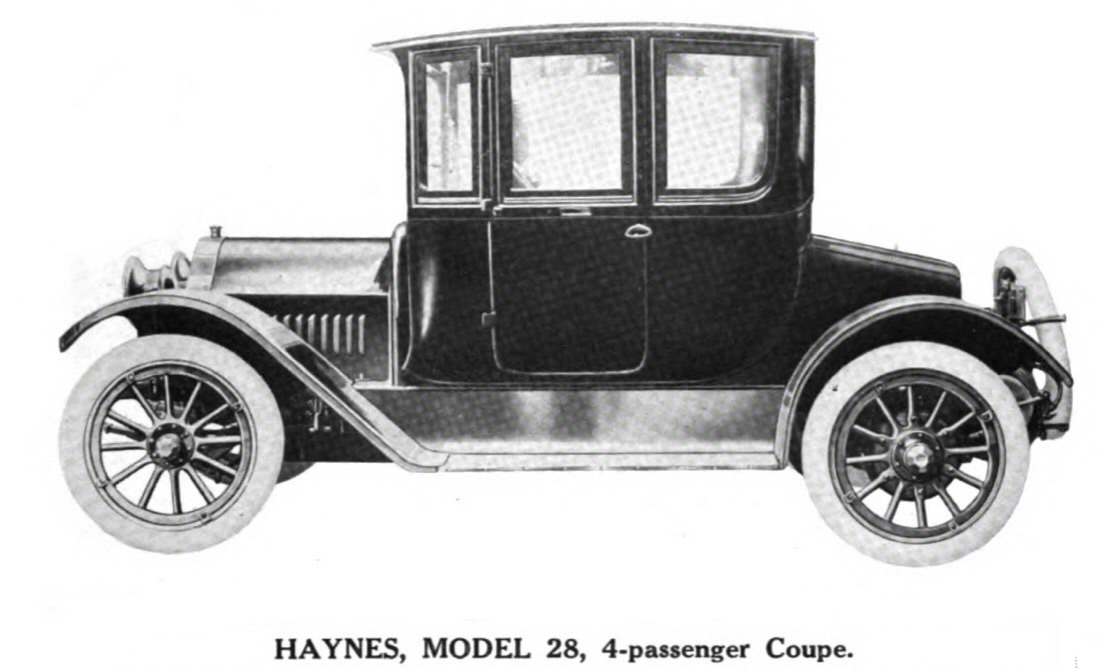
Haynes Model 28 (1913–1914)

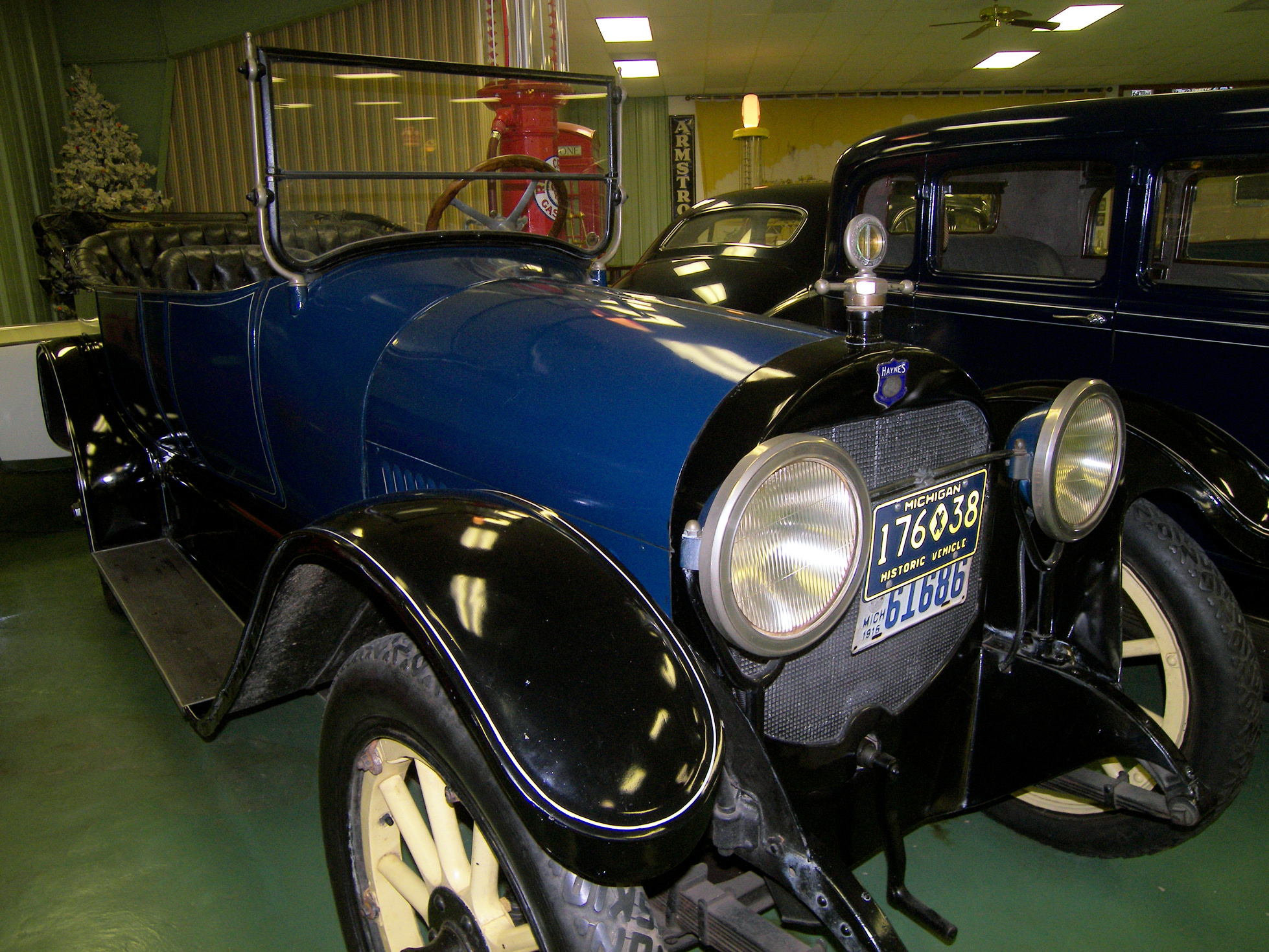
A 1916 Haynes

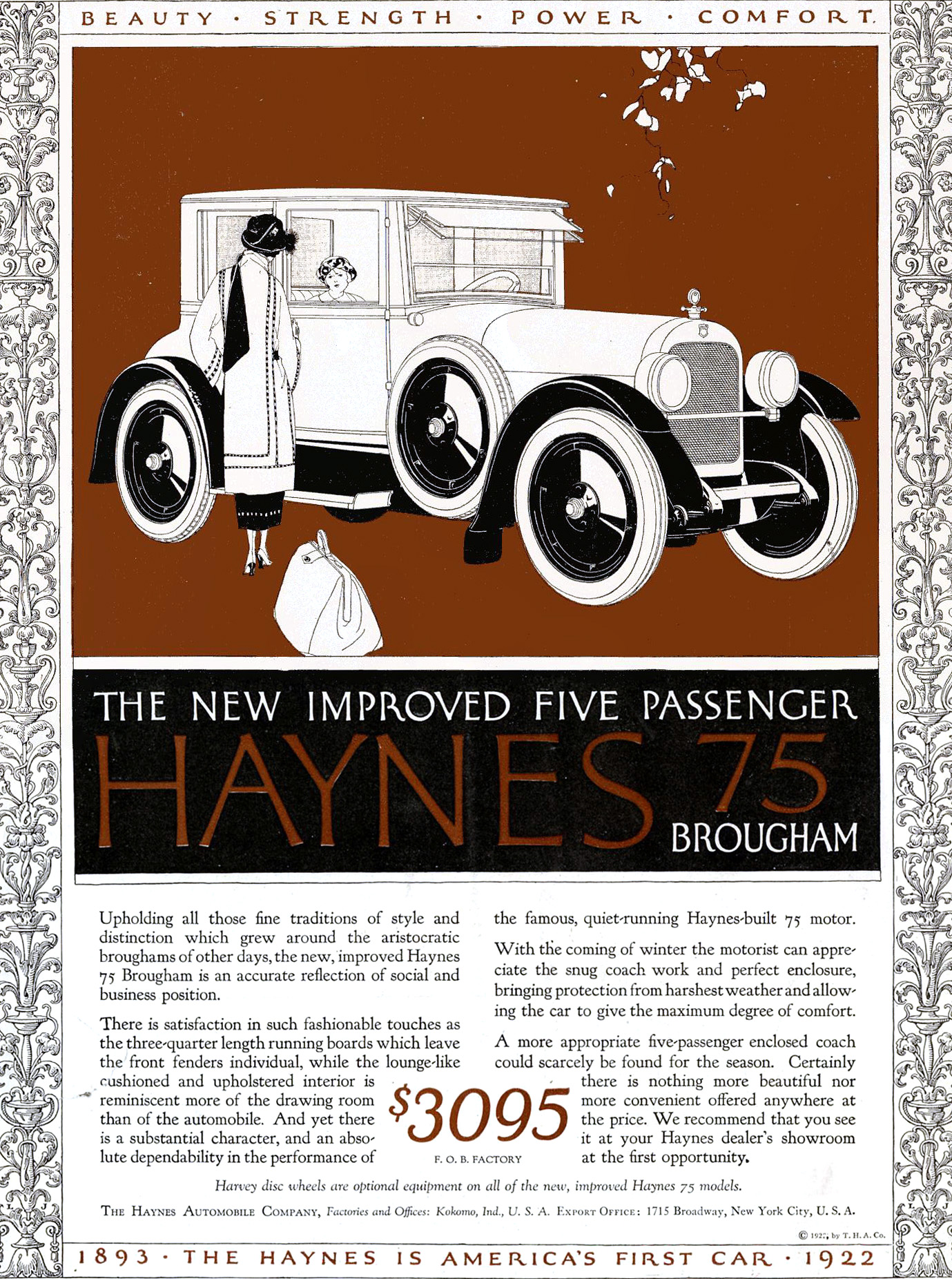
Advertisement for 1922 Haynes Brougham

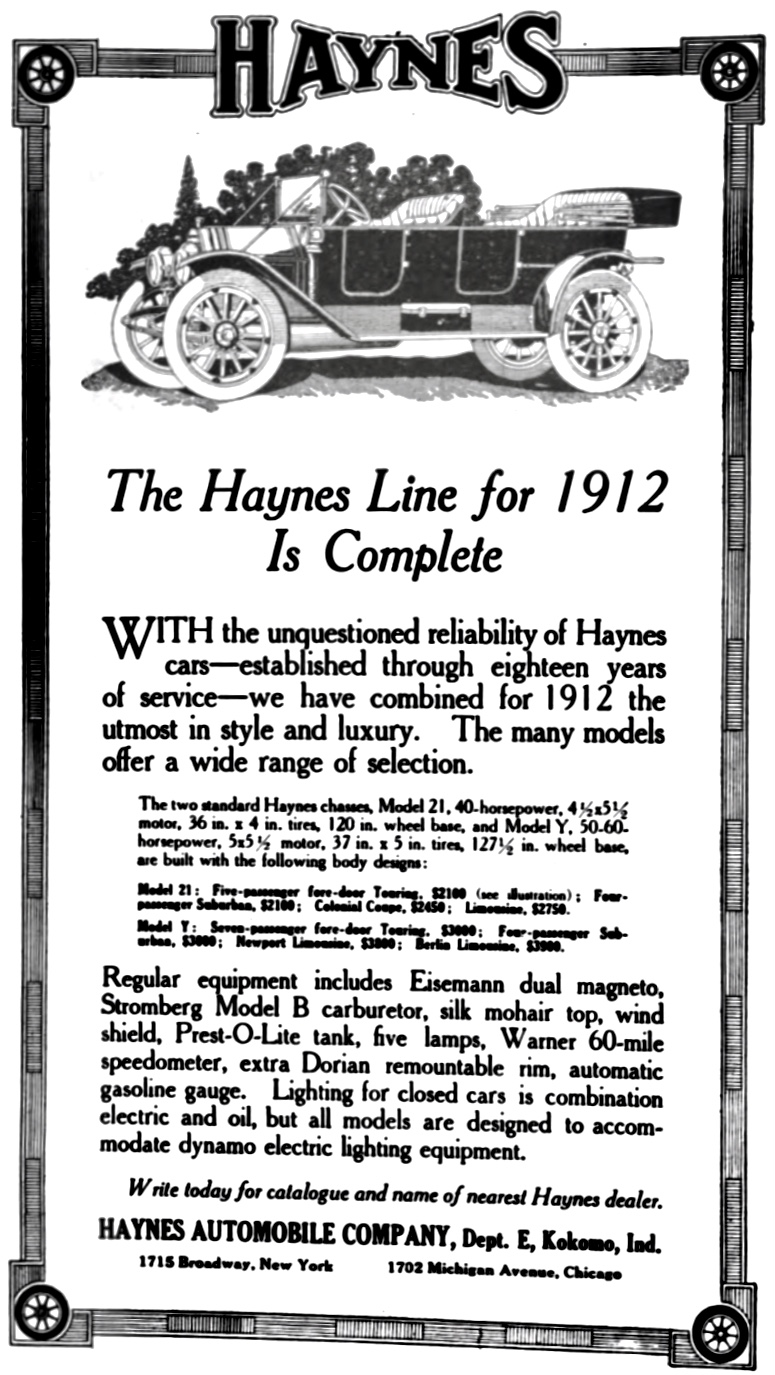
Haynes Advertisement (1912)

The Haynes Automobile Company also known by its badge as "America's First Car" was an early American automobile manufacturing company that produced automobiles in Kokomo, Indiana, from 1905 to 1924. The company was formerly known as the Haynes-Apperson company, and produced automobiles under that name from 1894 to 1905. Co-founder Elwood Haynes changed the name of the company to the Haynes Automobile Co after fellow co-founders Elmer and Edgar Apperson left to form the Apperson Brothers Automobile Company in 1901. The Haynes company was declared bankrupt in 1924 and went out of business in 1925.

== History ==
The company's history started with a running prototype on July 4, 1894, with the original Haynes-Apperson company. Local rival John Lambert of Indiana had designed and built a three-wheeled, surrey-topped, gasoline-powered runabout in 1891 – but then failed to sell a single one. Sensing an opportunity, Elwood Haynes approached John Lambert and secured a written agreement from Lambert to not contest Haynes' claim to having the FIRST American automobile ever made. Haynes' slogan and badge thus proclaimed "America's First Car".

Then he had cunningly used the date of his ideas and designs – mid 1893 – to be the start date of his Haynes Apperson car rather than its actual maiden run date of July 4, 1894 – and by doing so conveniently predated the other challenge to the claim of "first car" as the other contender – the Duryea actually ran on September 20, 1893. Duryea and Haynes argued and debated this for years afterwards.

Production in the early years was only about one car month but increased when they moved to the Riverside Machine Works to about 250 cars per year.

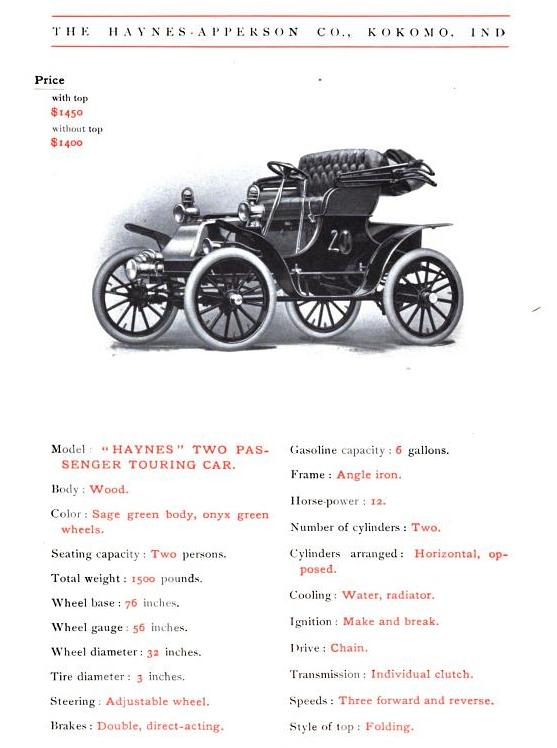
1905 Haynes Two Passenger Touring Car

The new Haynes company used oval-track racing and road racing as an advertising tool. Their Model V "Vanderbilt" Racer was a lightened version of their Model R Touring car. The Haynes qualified for the Vanderbilt Cup race in Suffolk County in 1905 but did not start. In 1906 it raced again but finished poorly against superior European cars.

Haynes discontinued oval track racing in 1907 and focused on reliability runs to advertise his cars solid reliability. This strategy paid off with his annual production peaking at over 6,000 cars in 1921.

In 1909 the Series X speedster models appeared with their 112" wheelbase and 354cu inch twin-spark four cylinder engines. At $2,900 FOB it was a spartan open speedster with no weather protection.

In 1912 they launched the Model 20 Bohemian speedster. A slightly longer 114" wheelbased model and with less horsepower (28) but at a more competitive price $1,650

After this speedster era they concentrated on touring cars. In 1914, Haynes offered a "Light Six" at $1485. Their ads boasted that it was, "The result of 22 years successful experience in building motor cars." Haynes also proclaimed it "Americas greatest light six", that it "will travel 22 to 25 miles on one gallon of gas" and "has more than 1 horsepower to every 55 pounds of weight."

For 1916, Haynes introduced the "Light Twelve", and refined "Light Six" new series, Models 36 and 37.

In 1923, just before going out of business, Haynes introduced the 57, with a 121-inch (3073 mm) wheelbase, in five-seat four-door sedan, three-seat coupelet, and two-seat roadster, advertised as complete with front and rear bumpers, six disc (as opposed to wire) wheels, wind wings, sun visors, "artistically fashioned individual steps" (for the running boards), and "individual fenders".

== Production models ==
- Haynes Model O
- Haynes Model R
- Haynes Model S
- Haynes Model T
- Haynes Model U
- Haynes Model V
- Haynes Model W
- Haynes Model X
- Haynes Model 19

== Production figures Haynes ==
More than 58.000 cars have been produced

Year	Production figures	Model	Serial number
1894	1		
1895			
1896			
1897	3		
1898	5		
1899	30		
1900	192		
1901	240		
1902	248		
1903	237		
1904	233		
1905	243		
1906	238	Model O, Model R	
1907	308	Model S, Model T, Model V	
1908	367	Model S, Model U, Model W	
1909	363	Model X	
1910	1.083	Model 19	
1911	1.110	Model 20, Model Y	
1912	1.310	Model 20, Model 21, Model Y	
1913	1.336	Model 26, Model 28	
1914	1.883	Model 28, Model 26, Model 27	6601 to 8499
1915	5.610	Model 30, Model 31, Model 32, Model 33	8552 to 10949
1916	9.813	Model 34, Model 35, Model 36, Model 37, Model 40, Model 41	10951 to 15999
1917	5.586	Model 36, Model 37, Model 40, Model 41	
1918	2.236	Model 38, Model 39, Model 44	
1919	3.746	Model 45, Model 46, Model 47	
1920	3.993	Model 45, Model 46, Model 47	
1921	6.021	Model 47, Model 48, Model 50	
1922	5.637	Model 75, Model 55, Model 48	75000 to 75999 (75), 43617 to 48099 (55), 21517 to 21650 (48)
1923	4.231	Model 57, Model 77, Model 60	1 to 7699 (57), 7700 to 10099 (77), 10100 to 11082 (60)
1924	2.129	Model 60	11083 to
1925	330	Model 60	55600 to
Sum	58.761		

== The Haynes Pioneer ==
"The Haynes Pioneer" was the official factory magazine of the Haynes Automobile Company. It was named after Elwood Haynes's first car, the 1894 Haynes "Pioneer". The magazine featured articles like "Ocean to Ocean in One Day" and "The 1897 Haynes "Horseless Carriage" Again Becomes Property of the Haynes Company" (1916).

== See also ==
- List of defunct United States automobile manufacturers

== Sources ==
- Clymer, Floyd. Treasury of Early American Automobiles, 1877-1925. New York: Bonanza Books, 1950.
- National Museum of American History: America on the Move
