= Francis Murphy (evangelist) =

American temperance evangelist

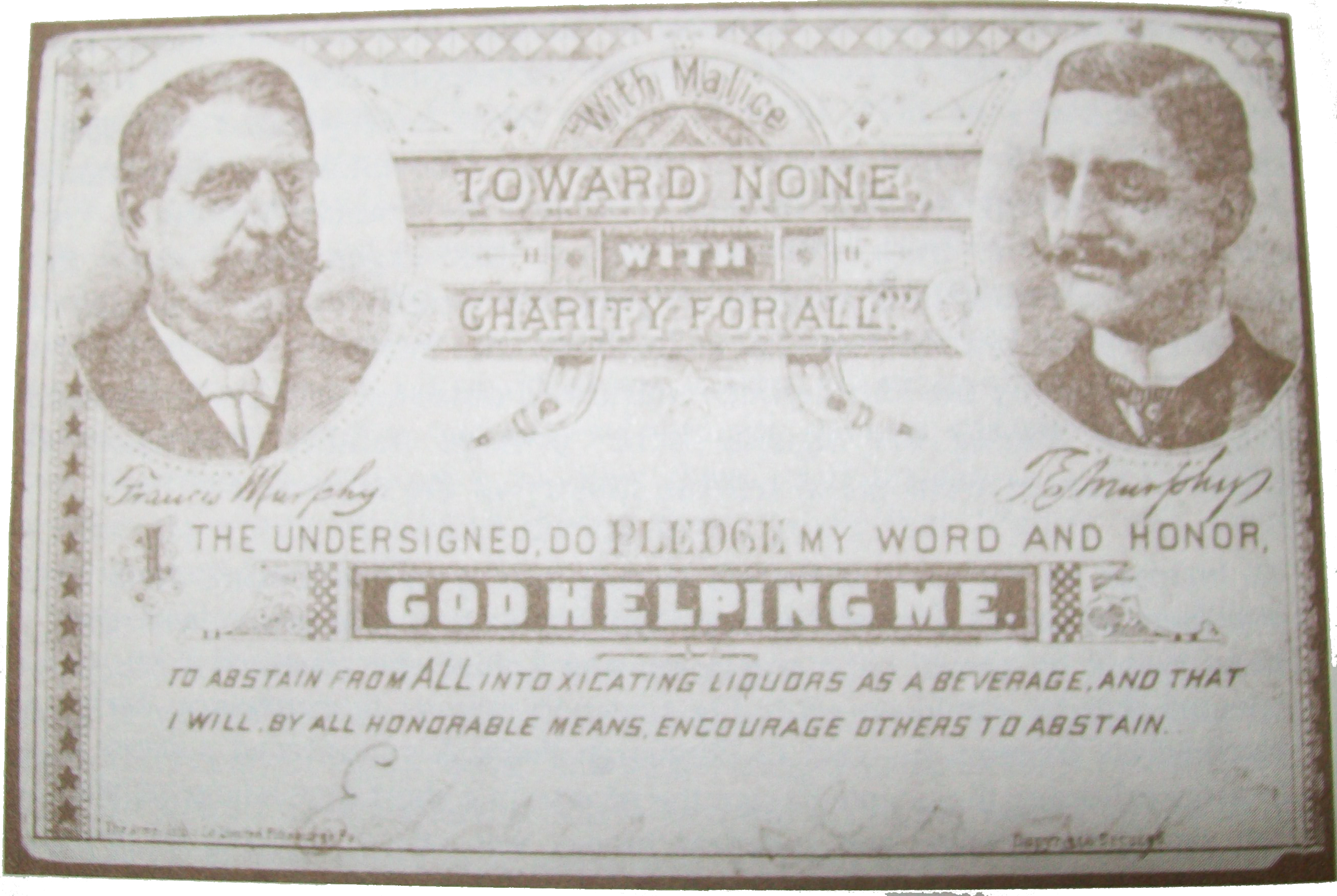
a Murphy Temperance pledge card, carried by those who pledged to avoid liquor

Francis Murphy (24 April 1836 – 30 June 1907) was an American temperance evangelist.

== Biography ==
Murphy was born in Tagoat, County Wexford, Ireland on 24 April 1836. He immigrated to the U.S. when he was 16 years old. He served in the Federal army during the Civil War. Beginning in 1870 at Portsmouth, N. H., he started temperance reform clubs throughout that state and was their first president. His headquarters were in Pittsburgh, Pennsylvania, and after his first address there in 1876, 65,000 people signed the pledge he wrote: "With malice toward none, with charity for all, I hereby pledge my sacred honor that, God helping me, I will abstain from the use of all intoxicating liquors as a beverage, and that I will encourage others to abstain." This is where he adopted the blue ribbon badge, inspired by a line from The Bible.

He labored also in Britain and was a chaplain in the Spanish–American War. In 1900, he went to Honolulu and held a series of meetings. From there he went to Australia, where he obtained a great many more signatures. In 1901 he returned to California to tour there and then established himself in Los Angeles, where he lived the rest of his life.

During the course of his temperance labors in America and abroad, Murphy is said to have induced 16 million to sign the pledge.

== Sources ==
- Talks by Francis Murphy, Lenore H. King, 1907, Southern California Blue Book Publishing Company
- Harper's Encyclopædia of United States History from 458 A.D. to 1902, 1901, Harper Bros.
- Grappling with the Monster: The Curse and the Cure of Strong Drink by T. S. Arthur, 2006, Dodo Press
