= Stellite =

Wear resistant cobalt-chromium alloys

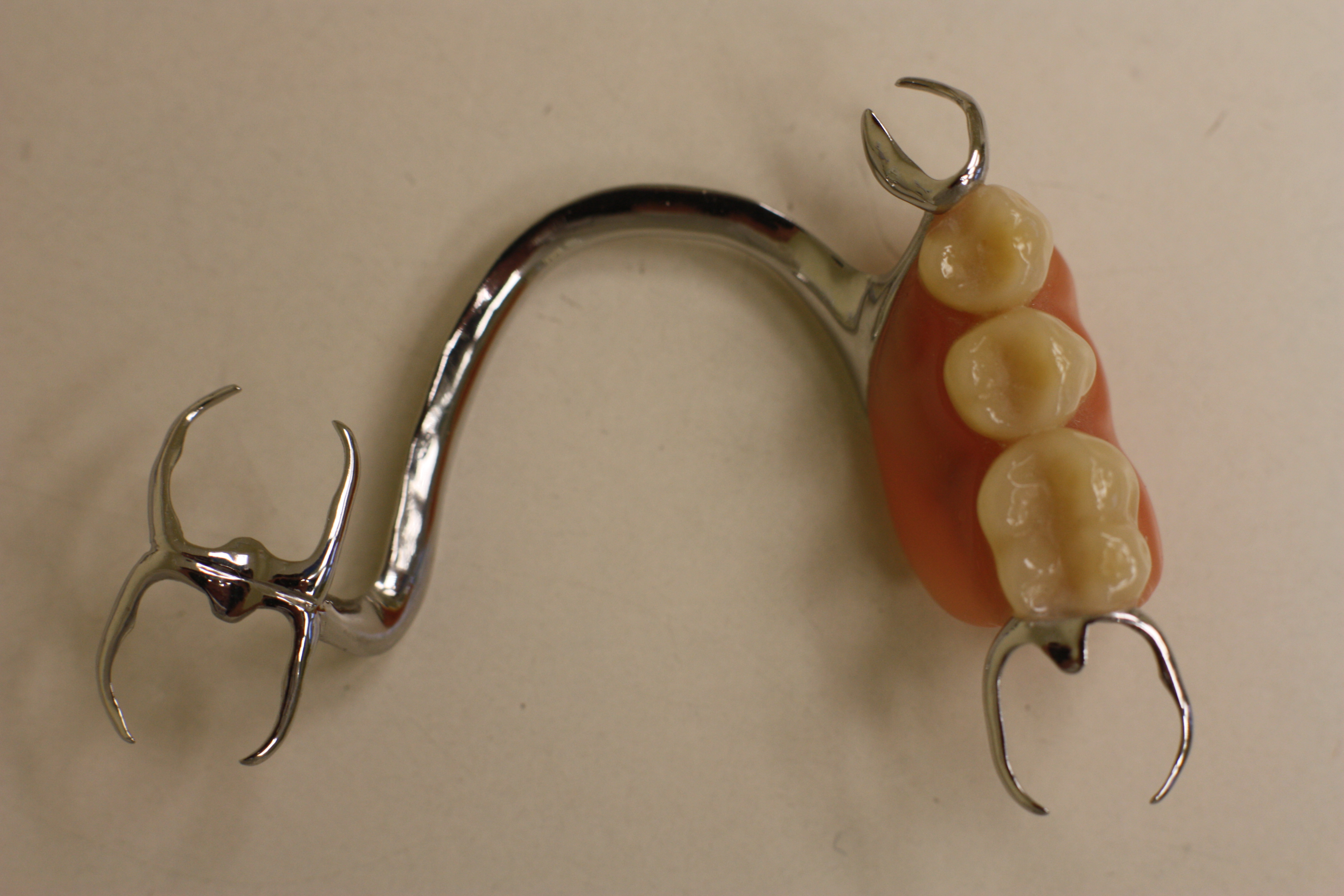
Partial prosthesis made with stellite alloys

Stellite alloys are a range of cobalt-chromium alloys designed for wear resistance. "Stellite" is also a registered trademark of Kennametal, Inc. and is used in association with cobalt-chromium alloys.

== History ==
Stellite was invented by metallurgist Elwood Haynes in the early 1900s, initially as a material for making cutlery that would not stain or require constant cleaning. He was granted a patent for two specific alloys in 1907, and for two related ones in 1912; once he had these four patents, he went into the business of producing his metal alloys. In the early 1920s, after considerable success during World War I in sales of cutting tools and high-speed machine tools made from Stellite, Haynes' company was bought by Union Carbide, becoming its "Stellite division", and continued to develop other alloys as well. The company was sold again in 1970 to Cabot Corporation, and in 1985 Cabot sold off the Stellite portion of the business. The Stellite trademark was acquired by Kennametal in 2012.

== Composition ==
Stellite alloys include a range of cobalt-based alloys, with significant proportions of chromium (up to 33%) and tungsten (up to 18%). Some of the alloys also contain nickel or molybdenum. Most of them have fairly high carbon content when compared to carbon steels.

== Properties ==
Stellite alloys are a family of completely non-magnetic and corrosion-resistant cobalt alloys of various compositions that have been optimised for different uses. Stellite alloys are suited for cutting tools, an example is Stellite 100, because this alloy is quite hard, maintains a good cutting edge at high temperature, and resists hardening and annealing. Other Stellite alloys are formulated to maximize combinations of wear resistance, corrosion resistance, or ability to withstand extreme temperatures.

Stellite alloys display outstanding hardness and toughness, and are also usually very resistant to corrosion. Typically, a part produced with a Stellite alloy is precisely cast so that only minimal machining is necessary. Due to the very high hardness many Stellite alloys are primarily machined by grinding, as cutting operations in some alloys cause significant tool wear even with carbide inserts. Stellite alloys also tend to have extremely high melting points due to the cobalt and chromium content.

== Applications ==
Typical applications for Stellite alloys include saw teeth, hardfacing, and acid-resistant machine parts. Stellite alloys were a major improvement in the production of poppet valves and valve seats for the valves, particularly exhaust valves, of internal combustion engines. By reducing their erosion from hot gases, the interval between maintenance and re-grinding of their seats was dramatically lengthened. Stellite alloys have also been used in some engines for the cam followers, particularly by the Norton Motorcycle Company.

The first third of the M2HB machine gun and M60 machine gun barrels (starting from the chamber) are lined with a Stellite alloy. The locking lugs and shoulders of Voere Titan II rifles also include a Stellite alloy. In the early 1980s, experiments were done in the United Kingdom to make artificial hip joints and other bone replacements out of precision-cast Stellite alloys. Stellite alloys are also used for making the cast structure of dental prostheses.

Stellite alloys have also been used in the manufacture of turning tools for lathes. With the introduction and improvements in tipped tools it is not used as often, but it was found to have superior cutting properties compared to the early carbon steel tools and even some high-speed steel tools, especially against difficult materials such as stainless steel. Care was needed in grinding the blanks and these were marked at one end to show the correct orientation, without which the cutting edge could chip prematurely.

While Stellite alloys remain the material of choice for certain internal parts in industrial process valves (valve seat hardfacing), cobalt alloys have been discouraged in nuclear power plants. In piping that can communicate with the reactor, tiny amounts could be released into the process fluid and eventually enter the reactor. There the cobalt would be activated by the neutron flux in the reactor and become cobalt-60, a radioisotope with a five-year half life that releases very energetic gamma rays. This phenomenon is more problematic in boiling water reactor (BWR) plants, since the steam is in direct contact with both the reactor and the steam turbine. Pressurized water reactor (PWR) designs are less susceptible. While not a hazard to the general public, about a third to a half of nuclear worker exposures to radiation could be traced to reactor components made of cobalt alloys (or stainless steel with trace amounts of cobalt in it).

Stellite alloys have also used as the cage material for the first commercially available artificial heart valve, the Starr-Edwards caged-ball valve, first implanted in 1960.

Stellite is used in pumps for components like impellers, wear rings, and shafts. Additionally, due to its strength retention at high temperatures, it is employed in power generation, chemical processing, and the food and pharmaceutical industries.

== Varieties ==
- Talonite is an alloy similar to Stellite alloys which has been hot-rolled and hardened in a particular manner, to provide a combination of hardness, wear resistance and machinability. Not all Stellite alloys respond to this rolling process.
- Vitallium, used for dentistry and medical implants.
