= Fairlawn =

Fairlawn may refer to:

Places in the United States (by state)

- Fairlawn, Florida
- Fairlawn (Lexington, Kentucky), listed on the National Register of Historic Places in Fayette County, Kentucky
- Fairlawn, Massachusetts
- Fairlawn (Worcester, Massachusetts), listed on the National Register of Historic Places in Worcester County, Massachusetts
- Fairlawn, Nevada
- Fairlawn, Ohio
- Fairlawn, Pennsylvania
- Fairlawn, Rhode Island
- Fairlawn, Pulaski County, Virginia
- Fair Lawn, New Jersey
- Fairlawn, Covington, Virginia, a neighborhood in the independent city of Covington, Virginia
- Fairlawn (Washington, D.C.), a neighborhood of Washington, D.C.
- Fairlawn (Kokomo, Indiana)

== See also ==
- Fair Lawn (disambiguation)
