= Kokomo, Indiana =

- City
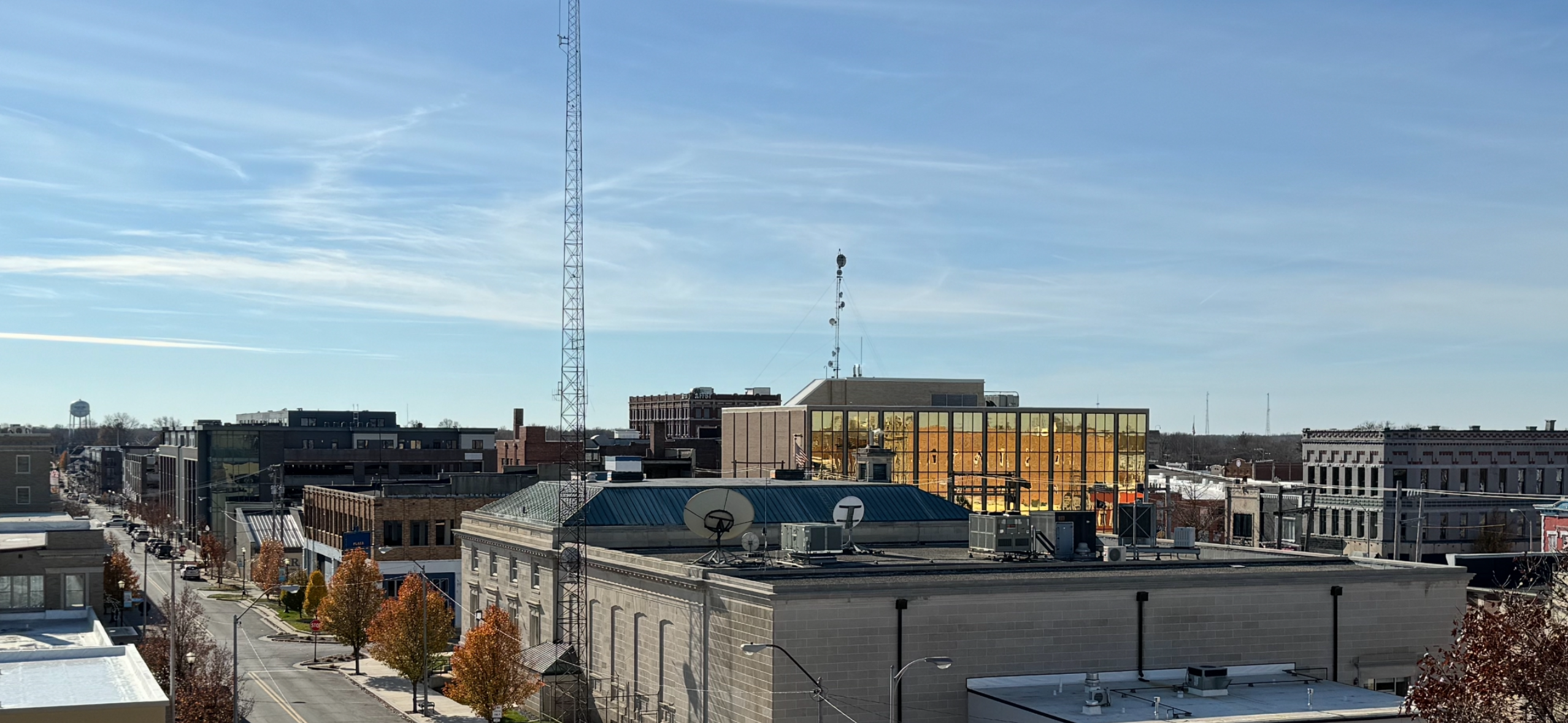
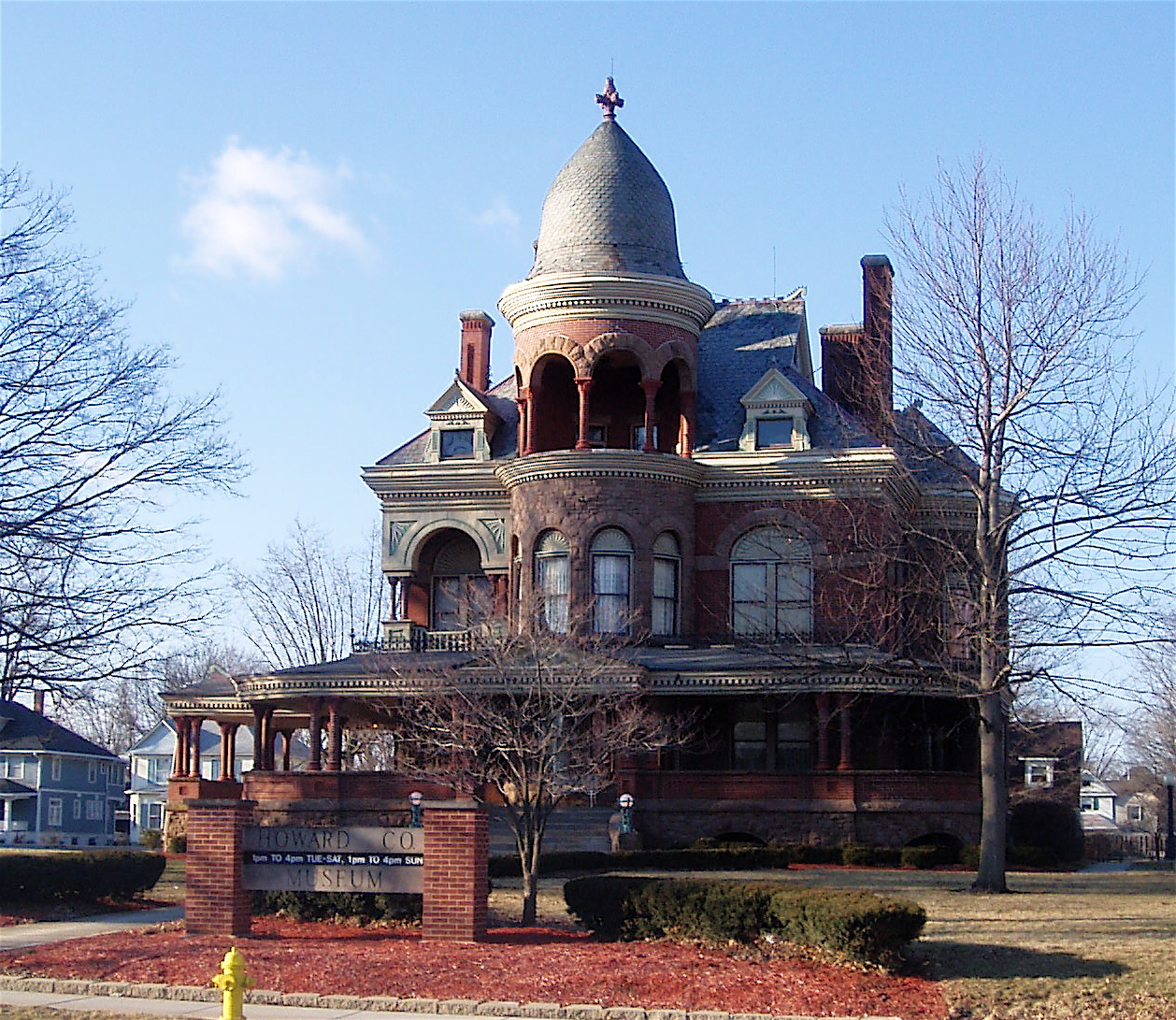
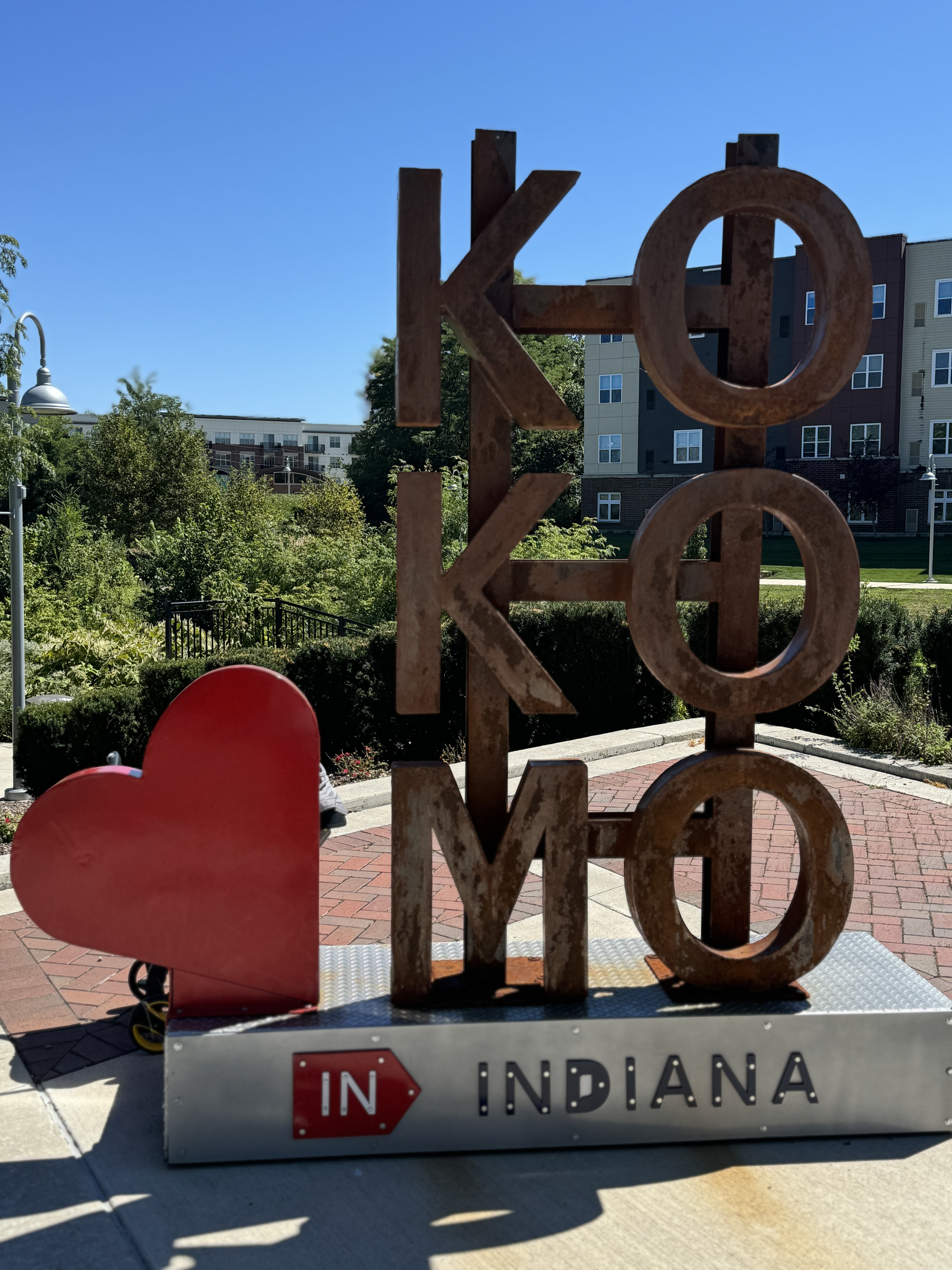
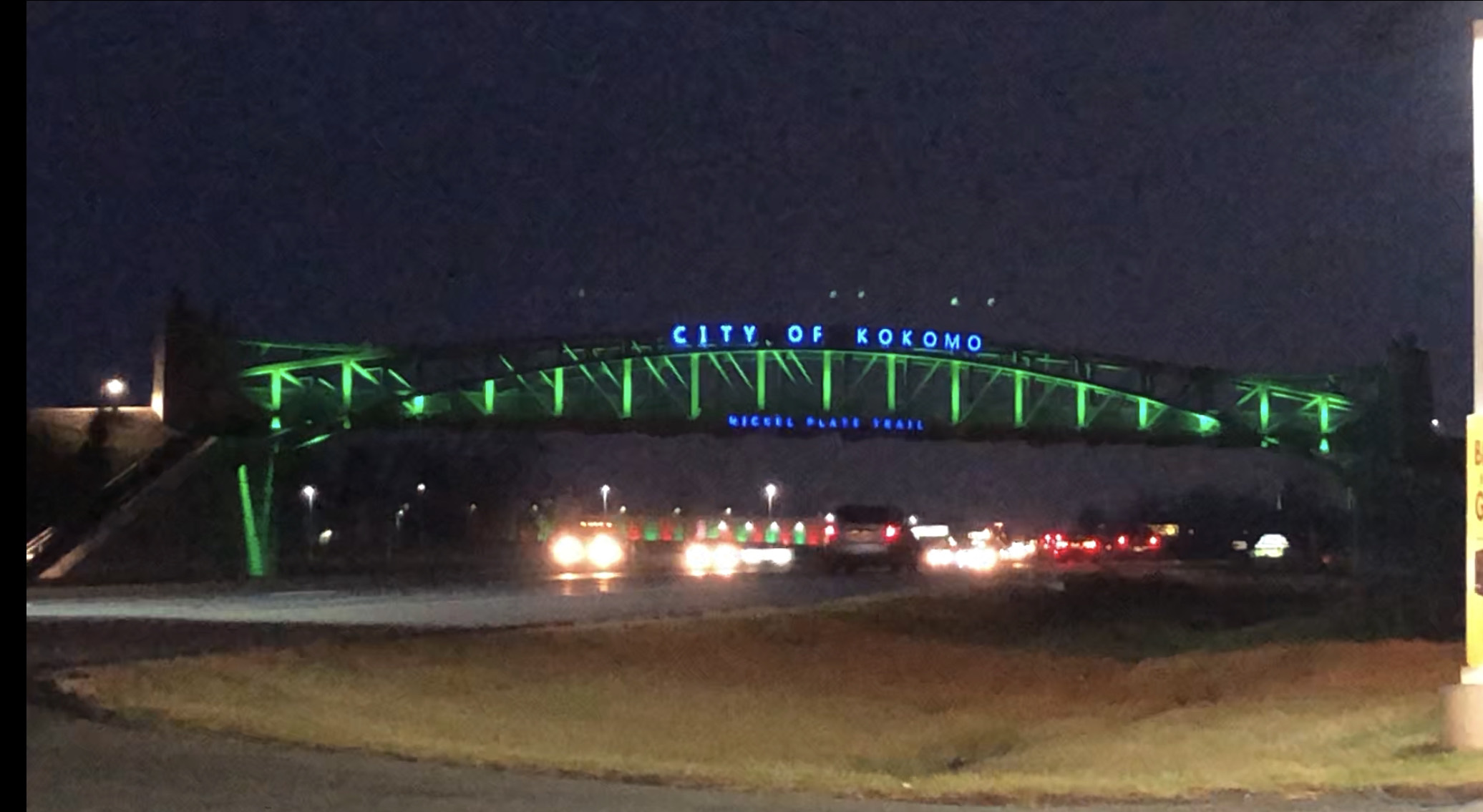
- Clockwise from top: Downtown Kokomo from Civic Center Tower, Seiberling Mansion, downtown artwork, Nickel Plate Trail

- Seal
- Nickname: City of Firsts
- Interactive map of Kokomo, Indiana
- Location within Indiana Location within the United States
- Coordinates: 40°28′56″N 86°7′54″W
- Country: United States
- State: Indiana
- County: Howard
- Established: 1855
- Named for: Ma-Ko-Ko-Mo

Government
  - Type: Mayor-council
  - Mayor: Tyler Moore (R)

Area
  - Total: 36.79 sq mi (95.29 km^{2})
  - Land: 36.68 sq mi (95.00 km^{2})
  - Water: 0.11 sq mi (0.29 km^{2})
- Elevation: 820 ft (250 m)

Population (2020)
  - Total: 59,604
  - Estimate (2025): 59,999
  - Density: 1,625/sq mi (627.4/km^{2})
- Time zone: UTC−5 (EST)
  - Summer (DST): UTC−4 (EDT)
- ZIP codes: 46901-46904
- Area code: 765
- FIPS code: 18-40392
- GNIS ID: 2395560
- Website: cityofkokomo.org

Kokomo (/ˈkoʊkəmoʊ/ KOH-kə-moh) is a city in and the county seat of Howard County, Indiana, United States. As of the 2020 census, Kokomo had a population of 59,604. It is the principal city of the Kokomo metropolitan area, which includes all of Howard County, and it is the largest city and regional center for the North-central Indiana region consisting of about 225,000 people across six counties anchored by the city of Kokomo. The city is located roughly 60 miles (97 km) north of Indianapolis and 85 miles (137 km) south of South Bend, Indiana.

Named for the Miami Ma-Ko-Ko-Mo, who was called "Chief Kokomo", Kokomo first benefited from the legal business associated with being the county seat. Before the Civil War, it was connected with Indianapolis and then the eastern cities by railroad, which resulted in sustained growth. Substantial growth came after the discovery of large natural gas reserves, which produced an economic boom in the mid-1880s. Among the businesses that the boom attracted was the fledgling automobile industry. A significant number of technical and engineering innovations were developed in Kokomo, particularly in automobile production, and as a result, Kokomo became known as the "City of Firsts". A substantial portion of Kokomo's employment still depends on the automobile industry.

== History ==
=== Early history and incorporation ===
The city of Kokomo was named after the Miami man Ma-Ko-Ko-Mo, said to have been one of the four sons of Chief Richardville, last of the chiefs of the Miami people. Kokomo is thought to have been born in 1775 and died in 1838. The only documentary proof of his existence is a trading post record of a purchase of a barrel of flour for $12 for his "squaw". His remains (with those of others) were reportedly discovered during the construction of a sawmill in 1848 and reinterred in the "north-east corner" of the Pioneer Cemetery. The tradition of the Peru Miami is that the town was named after a Thorntown Miami named Ko-kah-mah, whose name is rendered Co-come-wah in the Treaty at the Forks of the Wabash in 1834. That name was translated as "the diver" (an animal that could swim under water).

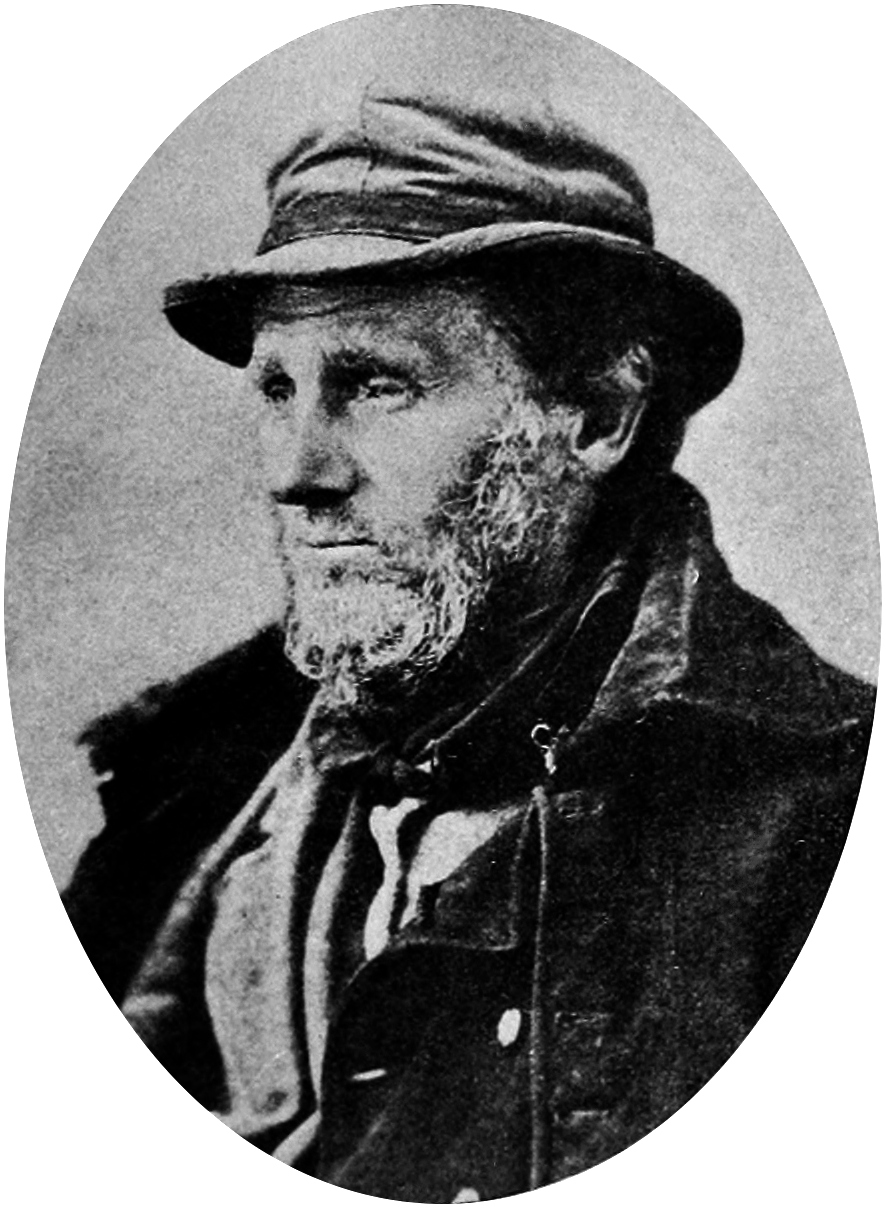
David Foster, founder of Kokomo

As a result of various removals, by 1840, the Miami population in Howard County (until 1846 known as Richardville County) was reduced to about 200. The principal settlement was the Village of Kokomo, on the south side of Wildcat Creek. Indian paths connected Kokomo with Frankfort and Thorntown (along the Wildcat) and led to Peru by way of Cassville, and to Meshingomesia by way of Greentown. At the time, David Foster had a trading post in Howard County, near the intersection of the reservation boundary line and Wildcat pike, where he engaged in both legitimate trade and illegal sale of alcohol to the Miamis on government property.

Shortly after Richardville County was organized in 1844, the commissioners appointed to establish the county seat approached Foster for a donation from his substantial holdings. (In 1846, tax records show that he owned 552 acres (223 ha) of farmland and 67 divided lots in the business district.) At the time of the request, the only improvements in what is now Kokomo were Foster's log house and log barn and several Miami huts. The commissioners sought a donation of the more fertile lands south of Wildcat Creek, but Foster refused, donating instead 40 acres (16 ha) north of the creek—land, which was thickly forested and "swampy". The terms of the donation required that Foster build a courthouse on the land, but he was later excused and Rufus L. Blowers was promised $28 to build it. He was penalized $2 for construction delays. The log courthouse was completed in 1845.

In June 1855, Henry A. Brouse petitioned the board of Howard County commissioners to incorporate the town of Kokomo. The original election was not held (for unspecified reasons), but another took place on October 1, 1855. After a vote of 62–3 in favor of incorporation, the board so ordered it.

On March 31, 1865, an election was held for Kokomo to assume a city government. The resolution was passed, and Nelson Purdum was elected the first mayor.

=== Early growth ===
In anticipation of business that the court would bring, Kokomo began a fairly quick growth from the time that lots were first sold on October 18, 1844. David Foster was granted the first license to sell merchandise in Kokomo at the December 1844 commissioners meeting. Two more merchants were licensed in March 1845. John Bohan, who would become a major shop owner, merchant, justice of the peace, and investor, moved to Kokomo in December 1844, and erected the first two-story frame house, not only in Kokomo, but in all the county.

After the enactment of the 1846 pre-emption law, settlers rapidly attempted to secure homesteads in the surrounding lands.

In 1848, Stonebreaker's Mill, 10 miles (16 km) west of Kokomo, began operations. By 1850, Kokomo had a newspaper, when James Beard purchased the printing equipment of the New London Pioneer and set up the Howard Tribune. By 1851, county business was so brisk that the county ordered the construction of two more court buildings, both one-story brick affairs, 18 by 36 feet (5.5 by 11.0 m). The county auditor and treasurer occupied one building, and the clerk and recorder occupied the other.

On April 1, 1854, Kokomo's first bank, the Indian Reserve Bank, was organized with David Foster, John Bohan, and Harless Ashly the principal shareholders. (It only lasted a few years until a robbery impaired its capital. The loss substantially injured Foster's fortune.)

=== Railroads ===
The first railroad stop at Kokomo occurred in 1854. The New London Pioneer had long advocated for a rail line to connect Kokomo with Indianapolis. Colonel C.D. Murray was the agent at Kokomo for stock subscriptions in support of the railroad. In 1852, the construction of the Peru and Indianapolis Railroad commenced. In Kokomo, Samuel C. Mills and Dr. Corydon Richmond, commercial competitors of David Foster's, donated several lots to the railroad to secure the location of the rail depot near their commercial property. The route was laid along Buckeye Street at the insistence of the merchants who hoped to reduced drayage expenses. Samuel Mills built a large frame structure at the Howard flouring mills, which served as a warehouse for the company's freight and a passenger depot. For some time after 1854, Kokomo was the terminus of the line, but eventually the line was extended to Peru and then to Michigan City.

A short time after the construction of the Peru and Indianapolis Railroad began, the Pennsylvania Railroad announced that one of its lines would pass through Kokomo. By 1853, a line was commenced between Kokomo and Logansport (which was intended to become the hub of a network of lines for the company). Railroad service was inaugurated on that line on July 4, 1855.

The most important rail line for Kokomo became the standard-gauge Clover Leaf line. This railroad would eventually link Kokomo with both the West Coast and the Eastern Seaboard. It began as a short line linking Frankfort and Kokomo, the Frankfort and Kokomo Railroad. Henry Y. Morrison of Frankfort was the principal promoter, and A.Y. Comstock acted for him in Kokomo. A failure of the proposed subsidy caused the promoters to turn all assets over to the contractors, who promised to complete the line. Construction began in 1873 and was completed the following year. Limited freight between the two cities made the line unprofitable. After a series of acquisitions by other railroads, the line became part of the Toledo, St. Louis and Kansas City Railroad. A line connecting it to the east reached Kokomo on January 1, 1881.

=== Mayor Cole ===
In 1881, one of the most remarkable and controversial events in Kokomo's history took place. Mayor Henry C. Cole was shot to death by a sheriff's posse. Dr. Cole had a curious history and had stirred up a great deal of passion in the previous fifteen years. He was reputed to have been a gifted surgeon, who served in the Union Army during the Civil War, and when afterwards he settled in Kokomo, he became a prominent physician. In Kokomo, he married a woman, Natalie Cole, of whom he became intensely jealous. He became suspicious of one Allen, whom he warned away from Kokomo. When he discovered Allen leaving the post office one day in October 1866, he shot him dead. The fact that the killing both took place in broad daylight and showed cold-blooded rage (Cole continued shooting after Allen was down) caused the crime to receive national attention. Cole's case was venued to Tipton County, where he retained Daniel W. Voorhees of Terre Haute to represent him. Voorhees obtained a not guilty verdict on a plea of emotional insanity. Cole divorced his wife thereafter.

Cole's reputation for violent instability, and the cowardice in the way he killed Allen, created many enemies for him, but his generosity toward poor patients and a promise to "clean up" the town won him enough support to win a bitter election for mayor in 1881. Shortly thereafter, on September 19, 1881, he was shot dead by a sheriff's posse at Old Spring Mills at West Jefferson Street. According to the coroner's inquest, he died from shotgun wounds inflicted by Deputy George Bennett (father of New York stage idol Richard Bennett). The sheriff claimed that an informant had advised him that Cole was planning to rob a flour mill, possibly to incriminate his enemies. The posse was forced to fire on Cole in self-defense (the sheriff claimed he had two revolvers) and to prevent his escape, although his injuries seemed inconsistent with that version. Cole's supporter's argued that no revolvers or burglary tools were produced and that the motive was implausible. Nevertheless, no action was taken against Bennett or the other members of the posse.

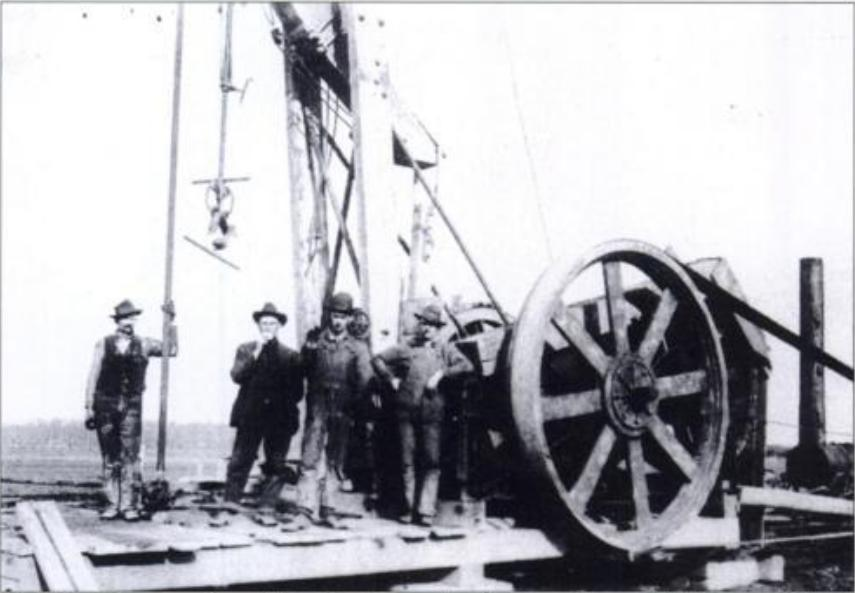
Natural gas miners and their drill, near Kokomo, Indiana during the Indiana Gas Boom, c. 1885

=== Natural gas boom ===
Natural gas had been developed in Pennsylvania and Canada for some time, and had most recently been developed around Findlay, Ohio. In March 1886, a group of citizens, led principally by A.Y. Comstock (who had promoted the Frankfort and Kokomo Railroad) and D.C. Spraker (later president of Kokomo Rubber Company), circulated a memorandum seeking subscribers (at $100 each) for the purpose of boring for gas at a distance of at least 2,000 feet (610 m) below ground. Obtaining the necessary 22 subscribers took until September. The first rig was built south of Wildcat Creek, and on October 6, 1886, natural gas erupted and the well was capped.

Together with the well in Eaton, which began producing slightly before Kokomo's, the discovery led to the Indiana Gas Boom. This discovery was directly responsible for Elwood Haynes' move to Kokomo, as a superintendent with a gas company with interests in Kokomo and Howard County. The Diamond Plate Glass Company (now part of PPG Industries) began in Kokomo in 1887, lured by the cheap and plentiful natural gas. The Kokomo Opalescent Glass Works started making stained glass in Kokomo in 1888 and has been in continuous operation ever since.

=== "City of Firsts" ===
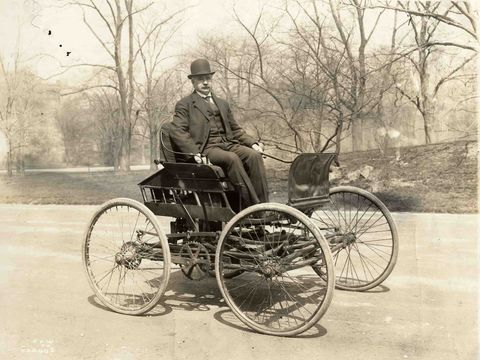
Elwood Haynes driving in his first automobile, the 1894 Pioneer, photo taken c. 1910

As a result of the natural gas boom, Kokomo attracted an increasing number of industries, which resulted in significant technological innovations. For these industrial and technical achievements, Kokomo is officially known as the "City of Firsts". Among other achievements, Kokomo was a pioneer of the U.S. automobile manufacturing, with Elwood Haynes test-driving his early internal-combustion engine auto there on July 4, 1894. Haynes and his associates built a number of other autos over the next few years; the Haynes-Apperson Automobile Company for mass-production of commercial autos was established in Kokomo in 1898. Haynes went on to invent stainless-steel flatware in 1912 to give his wife tarnish-free dinnerware. In 1938, the Delco Radio Division of General Motors (now Aptiv) developed the first pushbutton car radio.

Kokomo serves as the "City of Firsts" in the food industry, as well. In 1928, Walter Kemp, Kemp Brothers Canning Co., developed the first canned tomato juice because of a request by a physician in search for baby food for his clinic. Kokomo is also home to the first mechanical corn picker, which was developed by John Powell in the early 1920s. Kokomo was home to the first Ponderosa Steakhouse, which opened in 1965. Kokomo opened the first McDonald's with a diner inside, locally called "McDiner". This McDonald's theme failed nationally. Eventually, the "McDiner" closed and was converted back to a regular McDonald's restaurant.

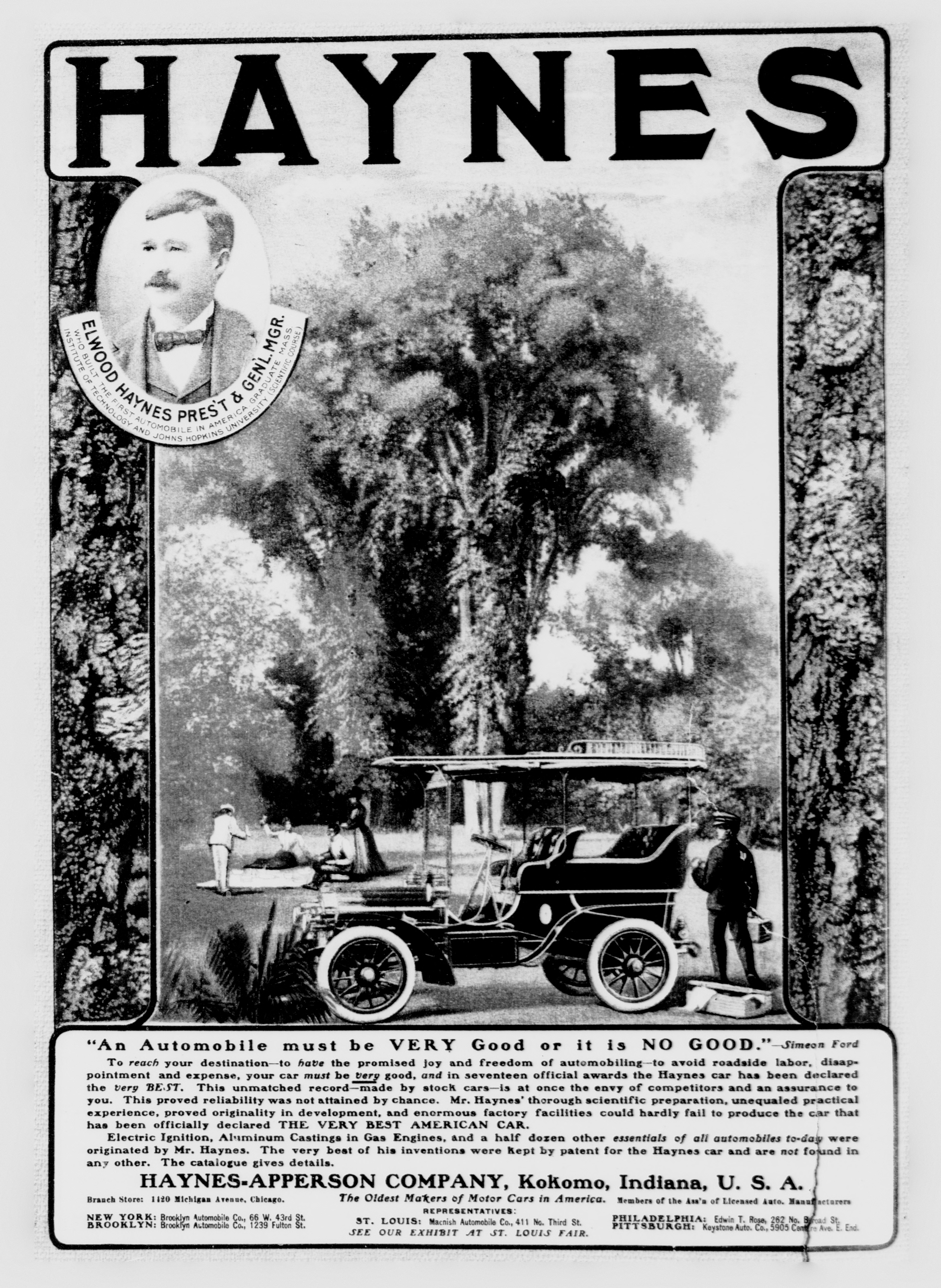
1904 newspaper advertisement for Haynes-Apperson

These inventions are associated with Kokomo:

- 1894 – Elwood Haynes made the first successful trial run of his "horseless carriage" on Pumpkinvine Pike, which is now Boulevard east of Indiana 931 (formerly U.S.31.)
- 1894 – The first pneumatic rubber tire in the US was created by D.C. Spraker at the Kokomo Rubber Tire Company.
- 1895 – The first aluminum casting was developed by William "Billy" Johnson from the Ford and Donnelly Foundry.
- 1902 – The Kingston carburetor was developed by George Kingston.
- 1906 – The first Stellite cobalt-based alloy was discovered by Elwood Haynes.
- 1912 – Stainless steel tableware was invented by Elwood Haynes as a response to his wife's desire for tableware that would not tarnish.
- 1918 – The howitzer shell, used in World War I, was created by the Superior Machine Tool Company.
- 1918 – The first aerial bomb with fins was produced by the Liberty Pressed Metal Company.
- 1920 – The mechanical corn picker was created by John Powell.
- 1923 – William Swern Sr. developed the first tire-building machine for mass production of auto tires.
- 1928 – The first canned tomato juice was created by Walter Kemp from Kemp Brothers Canning Company in response to a physician's need for baby food.
- 1938 – The first pushbutton car radio was created at Delco Radio Division of General Motors Corporation.
- 1941 – Globe American Stove Company manufactured the first all-metal lifeboats and rafts, known as Kokomo Kids in the U.S. Navy.
- 1947 – The first signal-seeking car radio was created by the Delco Radio Division of General Motors.
- 1956 – Delco Radio Division of General Motors produced a transistorized signal-seeking car (hybrid) radio, which used both vacuum tubes and transistors in its radio's circuitry. This transistorized car radio was available as an option on the 1956 Chevrolet Corvette models.
- 1957 – Delco Radio Division of produced an all-transistor car radio, as standard equipment for the Cadillac Eldorado Brougham.

=== 1913 Flood ===
On March 21–26, 1913 Kokomo suffered severe flooding when 6.59 inches (167 mm) of rainfall occurred. The Kokomo Tribune reported at the time that the Wildcat Creek over-topped its levee to reach nearly 1 mile (1.6 km) wide after rising at a rate of 3 inches (76 mm) per hour. Damage was widespread, including loss of electrical power due to the power plant being flooded. On March 26, flooding was declared over after the water level dropped 42 inches (1,100 mm) in a 24-hour period.

=== Continental Steel Corporation ===
From 1914 through 1986, the Continental Steel Corporation facility produced nails, wire, and wire fence from scrap steel on a 183-acre (74 ha) facility in Kokomo. Manufacturing operations in the steel plant and on other portions of the property included the use, handling, storage, and disposal of hazardous materials. Steel-making operations had included reheating, casting, rolling, drawing, pickling, galvanizing, tinning, and tempering.

After the company filed for bankruptcy in 1986, the EPA and the Indiana Department of Environmental Management investigated the plant and property and found soil, sediments, surface water, and ground water contaminated with volatile organic compounds (PCBs) and several metals, including lead, arsenic, cadmium, and chromium. Lead contamination was also detected in soils on nearby residential properties.

The site was proposed to the National Priorities List as a Superfund site in 1988 and formally added in 1989.

In April 2009, the EPA received almost $6 million in American Recovery and Reinvestment Act to complete needed cleanup at two problems at the Continental Steel Superfund site - the former Slag Processing Area and the site's contaminated ground water. The ARRA funding helped accelerate the cleanup of hazardous waste on the site. In the process, 15 Indiana contractors or subcontractors were involved in the ARRA-funded work, creating at least 45 temporary jobs.

In August 2010, using the ARRA funds, the EPA completed the cleanup of the former slag-processing area of the Superfund Site. About 86,000 short tons (78,000 t) of slag were moved to the site's acid lagoon area for use as fill on that portion of the site; Two feet (0.6 m) of clean soil were used to cap the former slag-processing area, leaving it suitable for potential redevelopment. ARRA funds were also used to address contaminated groundwater at the site. This work included extensive groundwater sampling to determine the contaminated plume area and installation of groundwater extraction and monitoring wells. Three wind turbines were to be used to generate much of the power needed to operate the groundwater extraction system.

Site cleanup was completed in August 2011.

In 2016, the former site was approved as the location of a solar farm with installation of panels beginning in August 2016. The estimated cost of the project was $10M. The solar energy park began operating on December 29, 2016.

=== Ku Klux Klan ===
In the summer of 1923, record numbers attended rallies of the Ku Klux Klan in Indiana. On June 16, 1923, a crowd of 75,000 attended a Klan rally in Terre Haute. On June 21 Argos held the largest rally it had ever seen. On June 26 a large Klan rally was held in Alexandria. All of this was merely a prelude to the rally planned for Kokomo. Conceived as a "monster tristate conclave", it was intended to charter 93 Indiana klans representing more than 300,000 members. Some doubted the prospect of 200,000 attendees, claiming it would be "without parallel in history"; others predicted attendance of 300,000. Extensive preparations for that number were made, including the scheduling of 1,000 interurban cars from around Indiana to Kokomo. The Union Traction Company, in addition to supplying 50 cars, transported three cars of white horses to Kokomo for the parade. The Kokomo Klan rented the fields surrounding its own large lot for parking, and electric amplifiers were obtained to allow the large crowd to hear the speeches.

According to historian Robert Coughlan, "literally half" of Kokomo residents were members of the Ku Klux Klan during its height in the 1920s and 1930s. On July 4, 1923, Kokomo achieved national notoriety when it hosted the largest Ku Klux Klan gathering in history. An estimated 200,000 Klan members and supporters gathered in Malfalfa Park for a massive Konklave in which D. C. Stephenson was elevated to the position of Grand Dragon of the Indiana Klan. Other estimates say the crowd was only 10,000. A huge flag was used that day to collect a reported $50,000 for construction of a local "Klan hospital" so that Klan members would not have to be treated at the only local hospital, which was Catholic. Both men's and women's Klans held weekly rallies and initiations in Malfalfa Park, and Kokomo's Klanswomen held meetings at the armory, the local headquarters of the Women of the Ku Klux Klan, and churches. A speech at a Baptist church was attended by 1,000 Klanswomen.

The Kokomo rally sent shockwaves through the national GOP, which had come to believe that the re-election of President Warren G. Harding depended on the vote of Indiana. According to the Washington correspondent of the New York World, Republicans feared that the Klan had "obliterated party lines" and "virtually swallowed" the Indiana Republican Party. Since the Republicans held only a 25,000 vote plurality in the state, any serious defection of African-Americans would tip the state to the Democrats. In the event, Harding died within a month and Republican Calvin Coolidge succeeded him with a substantial electoral majority (including Indiana) against a divided opposition. The Klan, however, continued to dominate state politics, especially after the election of Edward L. Jackson as governor.

=== Ryan White ===
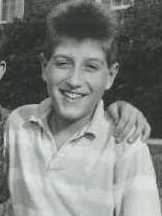
Ryan White in 1989 at a fundraising event in Indianapolis

Kokomo served to symbolize the nation's early misunderstanding and ignorance of AIDS in the mid- to late 1980s, when Ryan White was expelled from school due to his illness. White was a teenaged hemophiliac who had been infected with HIV through contaminated blood products (factor VIII). At the time, blood products were often collected through state prison systems. Factor VIII was made from pooled plasma of thousands of donors. Later, the plasma was screened for HIV and hepatitis and heat treated to inactivate those viruses. The teen had been attending Western Middle School (which is actually in Russiaville), but was ostracized by his classmates and forced to eat lunch alone and use a separate restroom. Many parents and teachers in Kokomo rallied in support of banning White from attending the school. A lengthy administrative appeal process with the school system ensued, followed by death threats and violence against White and his family, including a bullet being fired through the window of their Kokomo home. Media coverage of the case made White into a national celebrity and spokesman for AIDS research and public education. In 1987, the White family left Kokomo for Cicero, Indiana. Ryan attended Hamilton Heights High School in nearby Arcadia, where he was welcomed by faculty and students.

=== Gas tower ===
The Kokomo Gas Tower had been a symbol of Kokomo since it was constructed in 1954. The tower was 378 feet (115 m) tall and had a capacity of 12,000,000 cubic feet (340,000 m^{3}). Due to high maintenance costs of $75,000 a year, and up to $1,000,000 to paint it, the gas company decided to demolish it in 2003. Other ideas were reviewed before settling on this decision, including a plan to turn the tower into a giant Coca-Cola advertisement. On September 7, 2003, around 7:30 am, the Gas Tower was demolished by Controlled Demolition, Inc.. Pieces of the tower were sold to the public for $20–$30, and proceeds went to a planned Kokomo technology incubation center and Bona Vista.

== Geography ==
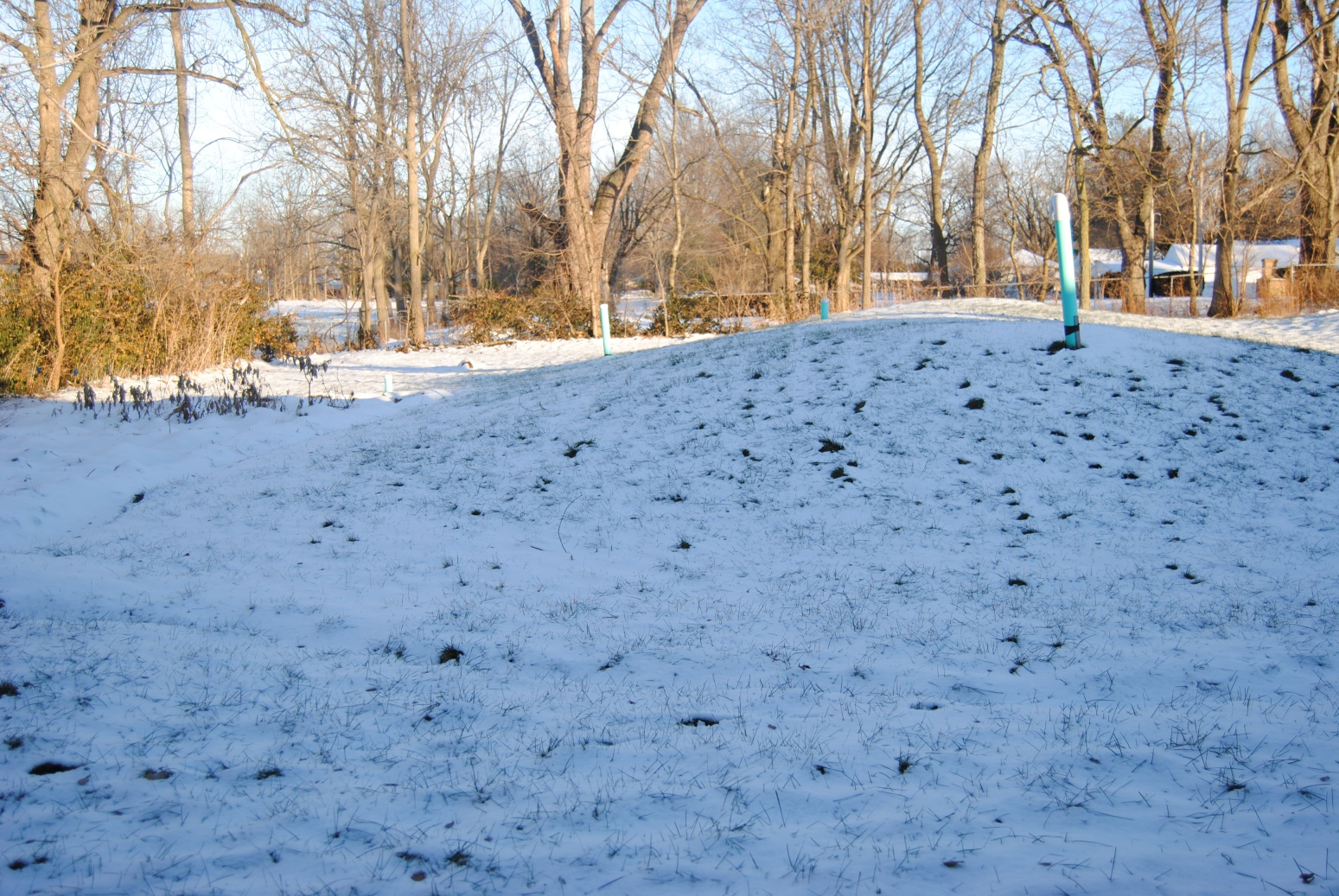
Weather of Kokomo during December 2016

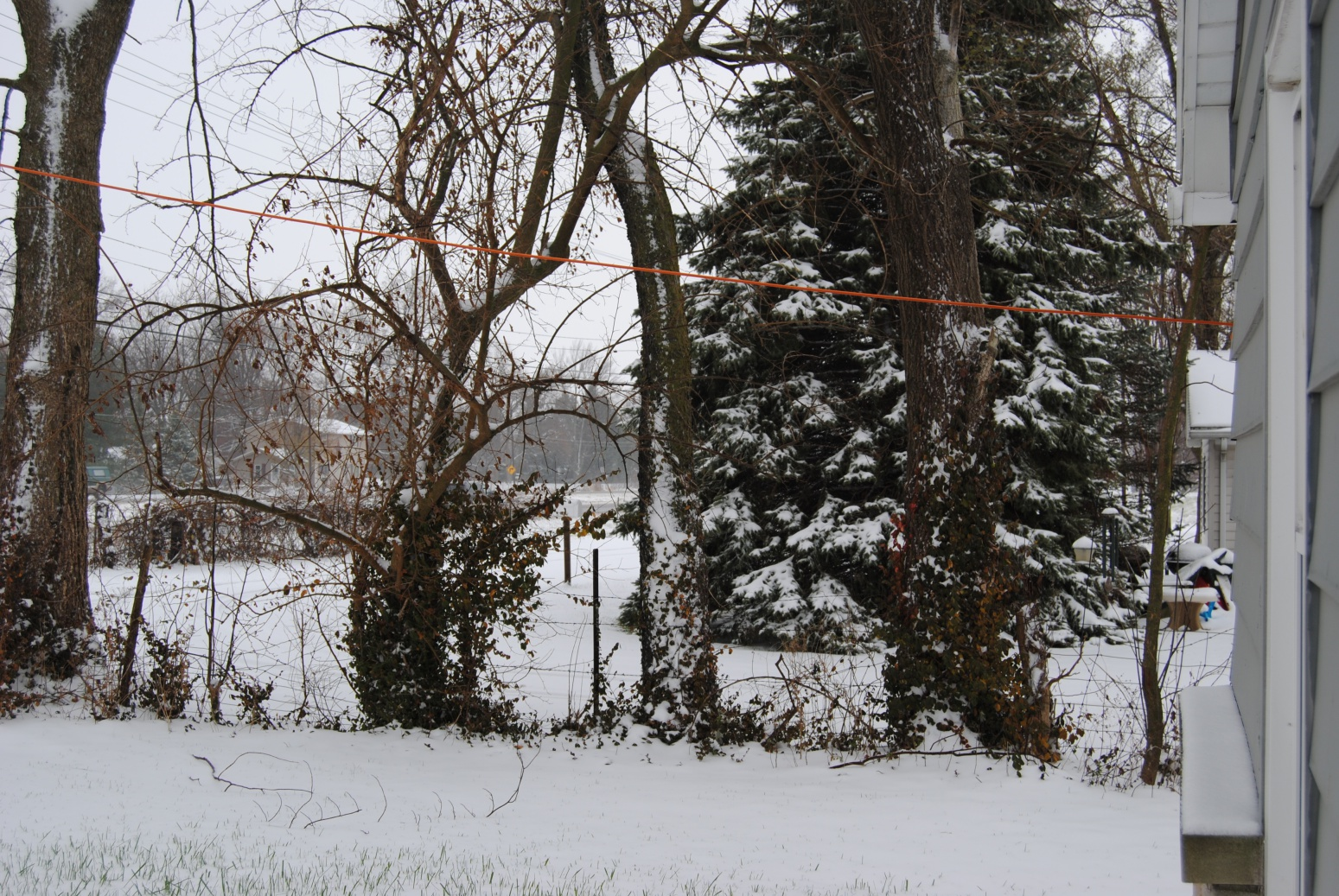
Weather of Kokomo during December 2016

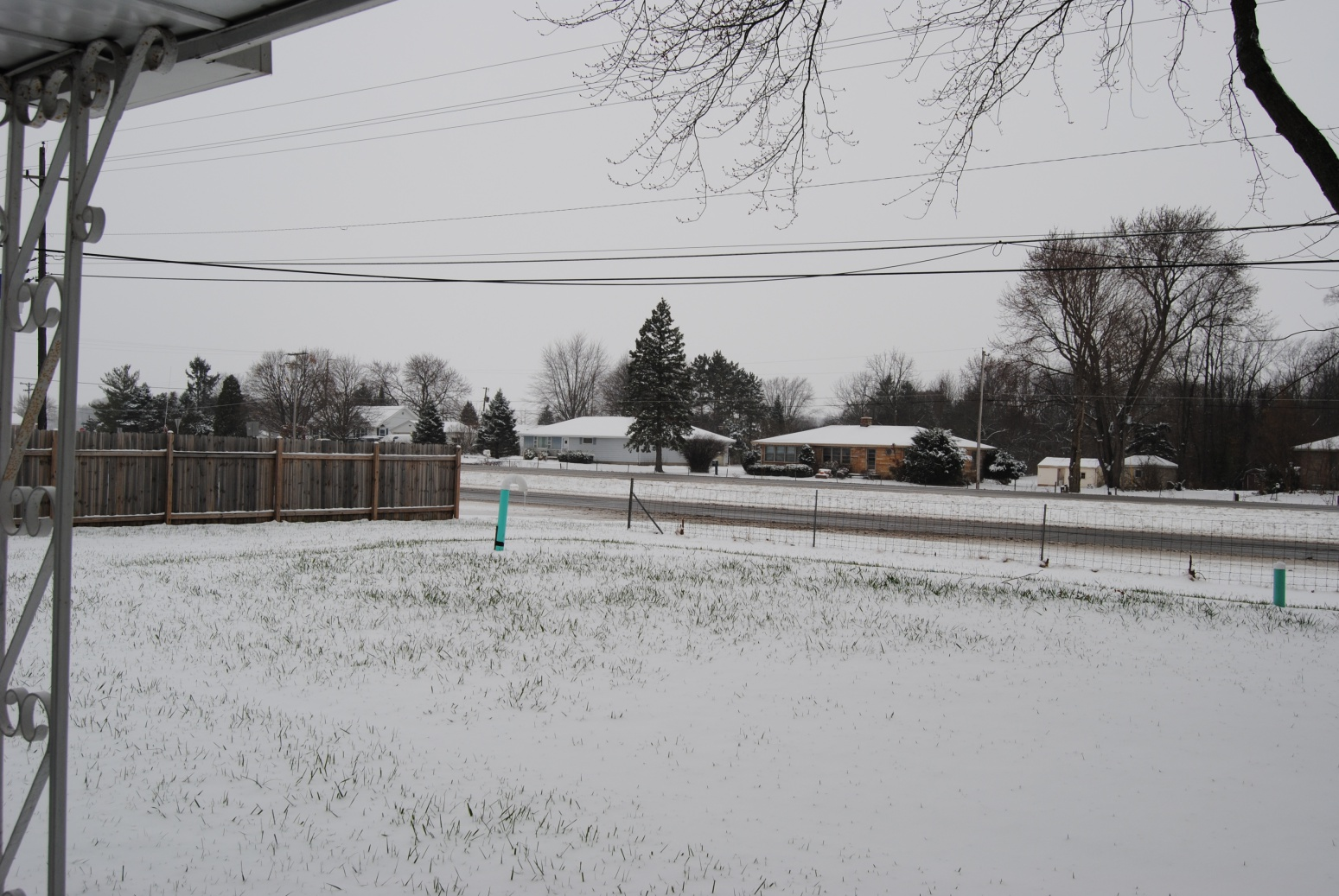
U.S. 31 during winters near Kokomo

According to the 2010 census, Kokomo has a total area of 18.559 square miles (48.07 km^{2}), of which 0.059 sq mi (0.15 km^{2}) (or 0.32%) is covered by water.

=== Climate ===
Kokomo has a humid continental climate (Köppen Dfa).

Climate data for Kokomo, Indiana (1991–2020 normals, extremes 1901–present)
| Month | Jan | Feb | Mar | Apr | May | Jun | Jul | Aug | Sep | Oct | Nov | Dec | Year |
|---|---|---|---|---|---|---|---|---|---|---|---|---|---|
| Record high °F (°C) | 72 (22) | 74 (23) | 86 (30) | 94 (34) | 100 (38) | 107 (42) | 110 (43) | 106 (41) | 103 (39) | 91 (33) | 81 (27) | 71 (22) | 110 (43) |
| Mean maximum °F (°C) | 55.5 (13.1) | 59.8 (15.4) | 72.3 (22.4) | 81.5 (27.5) | 87.7 (30.9) | 91.4 (33.0) | 91.7 (33.2) | 90.6 (32.6) | 89.6 (32.0) | 83.0 (28.3) | 69.5 (20.8) | 58.5 (14.7) | 93.6 (34.2) |
| Mean daily maximum °F (°C) | 32.5 (0.3) | 36.9 (2.7) | 48.7 (9.3) | 61.9 (16.6) | 72.6 (22.6) | 81.0 (27.2) | 83.7 (28.7) | 82.3 (27.9) | 77.2 (25.1) | 64.7 (18.2) | 49.9 (9.9) | 37.6 (3.1) | 60.8 (16.0) |
| Daily mean °F (°C) | 24.6 (−4.1) | 28.1 (−2.2) | 38.4 (3.6) | 50.2 (10.1) | 61.3 (16.3) | 70.3 (21.3) | 73.1 (22.8) | 71.4 (21.9) | 65.1 (18.4) | 53.2 (11.8) | 40.7 (4.8) | 30.2 (−1.0) | 50.6 (10.3) |
| Mean daily minimum °F (°C) | 16.7 (−8.5) | 19.3 (−7.1) | 28.1 (−2.2) | 38.5 (3.6) | 50.1 (10.1) | 59.6 (15.3) | 62.5 (16.9) | 60.5 (15.8) | 53.1 (11.7) | 41.8 (5.4) | 31.5 (−0.3) | 22.8 (−5.1) | 40.4 (4.7) |
| Mean minimum °F (°C) | −6.8 (−21.6) | −1.1 (−18.4) | 10.0 (−12.2) | 23.2 (−4.9) | 34.3 (1.3) | 45.1 (7.3) | 51.2 (10.7) | 50.0 (10.0) | 39.4 (4.1) | 27.8 (−2.3) | 17.1 (−8.3) | 3.7 (−15.7) | −10.2 (−23.4) |
| Record low °F (°C) | −26 (−32) | −20 (−29) | −10 (−23) | 8 (−13) | 26 (−3) | 34 (1) | 41 (5) | 37 (3) | 27 (−3) | 17 (−8) | −5 (−21) | −24 (−31) | −26 (−32) |
| Average precipitation inches (mm) | 2.95 (75) | 2.43 (62) | 3.18 (81) | 4.28 (109) | 4.72 (120) | 5.21 (132) | 4.73 (120) | 3.85 (98) | 3.66 (93) | 3.21 (82) | 3.33 (85) | 2.85 (72) | 44.40 (1,128) |
| Average snowfall inches (cm) | 10.6 (27) | 9.8 (25) | 5.2 (13) | 0.7 (1.8) | 0.0 (0.0) | 0.0 (0.0) | 0.0 (0.0) | 0.0 (0.0) | 0.0 (0.0) | 0.1 (0.25) | 1.5 (3.8) | 6.2 (16) | 34.1 (87) |
| Average precipitation days (≥ 0.01 in) | 13.1 | 10.7 | 12.2 | 12.7 | 13.3 | 12.4 | 11.0 | 9.7 | 8.8 | 10.6 | 10.8 | 12.7 | 138.0 |
| Average snowy days (≥ 0.1 in) | 7.2 | 6.0 | 3.1 | 0.7 | 0.0 | 0.0 | 0.0 | 0.0 | 0.0 | 0.1 | 1.6 | 5.3 | 24.0 |
Source: NOAA

=== 1965 tornado ===
On April 11, 1965, the southern part of Kokomo was struck by one of the 47 tornadoes that erupted over six Midwestern states, an event now known as the Palm Sunday outbreak. The F4 tornado that swept through Kokomo was 800 yards (730 m) wide and killed 25 people in the surrounding area. Significant damage was done to the Chrysler transmission plant. Windows were broken and the framework cracked throughout, and sections of the west wall were leveled. The Maple Crest elementary and junior high schools suffered extensive damage. The roof collapsed on the junior high school, and the framework of both schools was substantially wrecked. The Maple Crest Shell Station at the intersection of Lincoln and Washington was torn from its foundation and scattered about. Mills Drug Store at the same intersection was demolished. A house on Holly Lane was uprooted, and one on James Drive was demolished. The Maple Crest Shopping Center was extensively damaged, with Woolworth's suffering the most damage. The front and back of the one-story structure were caved in and merchandise was strewn about. Numerous homes in the Maple Crest area were flattened, and the top floor of the Maple Crest apartments was blown off. The only thing left standing on the nearby Church of the Brethren was the steeple. The force of the wind on the flat earth near Kokomo was so great that Ted Fujita was able to make aerial photographs of the spiral scouring on the ground.

=== 2016 tornado ===
On August 24, 2016, a strong EF3 tornado damaged 1,000 homes on the city's south side, with 170 sustaining major damage; 80 of these homes were destroyed, with some sustaining loss of roofs and exterior walls. Many large trees and power poles were snapped along the tornado's path, and an apartment complex was heavily damaged, as well. Vehicles also sustained damage, including a large truck that was moved 10 feet from the driveway of a house and flipped over. A Starbucks was completely destroyed, and several people were left trapped inside the still standing bathroom and had to be rescued. Many sheds and detached garages were also destroyed in the storm. A receipt from Kokomo was found 30 miles away in Marion. The storm followed a path very close to that of another tornado which hit on November 17, 2013. Meteorologists have noted that nearly every tornado in Kokomo has struck the southern part of the city.

=== Other notable tornadoes ===
Kokomo has been struck by 18 tornadoes between 1950 and 2015, some of which were strong enough to claim lives.

On March 6, 1961, two F3 tornadoes struck the southern part of Kokomo, killing one person and injuring three others.

On April 20, 2004, two tornadoes struck the northern part of Kokomo. The first tornado was rated F0 and caused little damage to homes and trees. The second tornado was rated F1 and caused a roof to collapse at the skating rink and damaged three other homes and a truck stop. Both tornadoes caused one injury but no fatalities. This was the first time a tornado struck the northern part of Kokomo.

On November 17, 2013, two EF2 tornadoes tore through the southern part of Kokomo. The first tornado damaged over 300 homes and businesses. The second tornado touched down briefly and caused damage to a golf course and other businesses. The two tornadoes caused no fatalities and only five injuries.

=== Neighborhoods ===
These are neighborhoods in Kokomo according to the city transportation map:

- Berkley Meadows
- Bon Air
- Cedar Crest
- Country Club Hills
- Cricket Hill
- Darrough Chapel
- Devon Woods
- Doral Park
- Downtown Kokomo
- Emerald Lake
- Fairlawn
- Forest Park
- Forest Park Estates
- Fredrick Farms
- Greentree
- Highland Springs
- Holiday Hills
- Holiday Park
- Indian Heights
- Ivy Hills
- Maple Crest
- Markland Heights
- Mayfield
- Old Silk Stocking
- Orleans Southwest
- Pittsburgh Plate Glass
- Stonybrook
- Sycamore Village
- Terrace Gardens
- Terrace Meadows
- The Preserves at Bridgewater
- Urbandale
- Vinton Woods
- Water's Edge
- Old Westbrook
- New Westbrook
- Western Woods
- Willowridge
- Webster Estates
- Wynterbrook

== Demographics ==
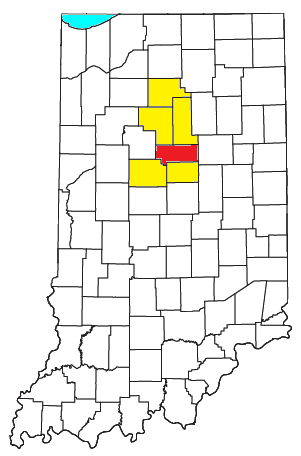
Location of the Kokomo MSA within the larger North Central Indiana Region: Kokomo Metropolitan Statistical Area North Central Indiana Region

Historical population
| Census | Pop. | Note | %± |
|---|---|---|---|
| 1850 | 378 | | — |
| 1860 | 1,040 | | 175.1% |
| 1870 | 2,177 | | 109.3% |
| 1880 | 4,042 | | 85.7% |
| 1890 | 8,261 | | 104.4% |
| 1900 | 10,609 | | 28.4% |
| 1910 | 17,010 | | 60.3% |
| 1920 | 30,067 | | 76.8% |
| 1930 | 32,843 | | 9.2% |
| 1940 | 33,795 | | 2.9% |
| 1950 | 38,672 | | 14.4% |
| 1960 | 47,197 | | 22.0% |
| 1970 | 44,042 | | −6.7% |
| 1980 | 47,808 | | 8.6% |
| 1990 | 44,962 | | −6.0% |
| 2000 | 46,113 | | 2.6% |
| 2010 | 45,468 | | −1.4% |
| 2020 | 59,604 | | 31.1% |
| 2024 (est.) | 60,093 | | 0.8% |
U.S. Decennial Census; 2018 Estimate

=== Kokomo metropolitan area ===
Kokomo is the principal city of the Kokomo metropolitan area and the largest city of the North-central Indiana region, which has about 225,000 people. The Kokomo MSA joins the larger Indianapolis metropolitan statistical area (MSA) along with the Muncie MSA, Columbus MSA, and six other micropolitan areas to form a vast combined statistical area covering 20 counties. In 2022, the CSA's population estimate was 2,631,863, ranking it as the 27th-largest in the U.S.

=== 2020 census ===
As of the 2020 census, Kokomo had a population of 59,604. The median age was 40.1 years; 22.0% of the residents were under 18 and 19.6% were 65 or older. For every 100 females, there were 91.0 males, and for every 100 females 18 and over, there were 87.8 males 18 and over.

About 98.5% of residents lived in urban areas, while 1.5% lived in rural areas.

Of the 26,266 households in Kokomo, 26.2% had children under 18 living in them, 36.5% were married-couple households, 21.1% were households with a male householder and no spouse or partner present, and 34.7% were households with a female householder and no spouse or partner present. About 36.4% of all households were made up of individuals, and 15.7% had someone living alone who was 65 or older.

The city had 29,553 housing units, of which 11.1% were vacant. The homeowner vacancy rate was 2.8% and the rental vacancy rate was 11.5%.

Racial composition as of the 2020 census
| Race | Number | Percentage |
|---|---|---|
| White | 47,141 | 79.1% |
| Black or African American | 6,293 | 10.6% |
| American Indian and Alaska Native | 186 | 0.3% |
| Asian | 894 | 1.5% |
| Some other race | 957 | 1.6% |
| Two or more races | 4,119 | 6.9% |
| Hispanic or Latino (of any race) | 2,532 | 4.2% |

=== 2000 census ===
As of 2000, the median income in the city for a household was $36,258 and for a family was $45,353. Males had a median income of $38,420 versus $24,868 for females. The per capita income for the city was $20,083. About 9.6% of families and 13.0% of the population were below the poverty line, including 18.5% of those under 18 and 9.3% of those 65 or over.

=== 2010 census ===
As of the 2010 census, 45,468 people, 19,848 households, and 11,667 families resided in the city. The population density was 2,457.7 inhabitants per square mile (948.9/km^{2}). The 23,010 housing units had an average density of 1,243.8 per square mile (480.2/km^{2}). The racial makeup of the city was 83.5% White, 10.7% African American, 0.4% Native American, 1.0% Asian, 1.1% from other races, and 3.3% from two or more races. Hispanics or Latinos of any race were 3.3% of the population.

Of the 19,848 households, 30.0% had children under 18 living with them, 37.4% were married couples living together, 16.6% had a female householder with no husband present, 4.8% had a male householder with no wife present, and 41.2% were not families. About 35.4% of all households were made up of individuals, and 13.2% had someone living alone who was 65 or older. The average household size was 2.25, and the average family size was 2.90.

The median age in the city was 38.2 years; 24% of residents were under 18, 8.8% were between 18 and 24, 25.2% were from 25 to 44, 26.2% were from 45 to 64, and 15.8% were 65 or older. The gender makeup of the city was 46.8% male and 53.2% female.

== Economy ==
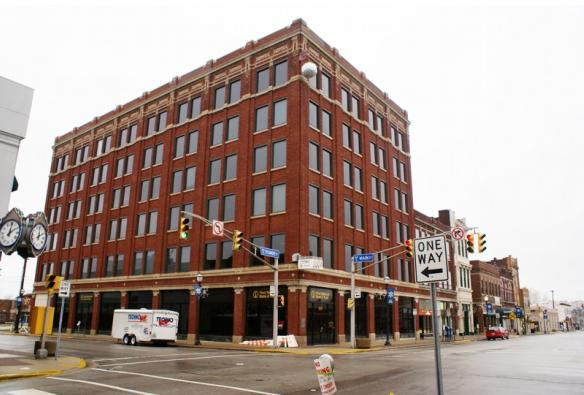
Downtown Kokomo in 2008

Kokomo's employment, largely based in manufacturing, was hit hard by the economic downturn, which led to the recession beginning in December 2007. In December 2008, Kokomo was ranked third by Forbes in its list of America's fastest-dying towns, mainly as a result of the financial difficulties of the automotive industry.

In May 2011, Forbes listed Kokomo as one of the "Best Cities for Jobs" after the city ascended 177 places in the rankings. The same article described Kokomo's success in the past few years as "inspirational" and attributed the turnaround to "a revival in manufacturing." In June 2011, Conexus released a report touting Kokomo's "rapid bounce" after the recession, and predicted a rise in income of more than 2%, assuming increased automobile production.

By May 2013, Kokomo's unemployment rate was 9%, representing a 1.4% decrease in nonfarm employment, it was higher than the national rate of 7.6%. The May 2013 statistics reported a 6.9% decline in manufacturing jobs over the previous 12 months. Government employment was 18.7% below the previous year.

Major employers are:

- Chrysler Division of Stellantis
  - Kokomo Transmission Plant (3,583 employees)
  - Kokomo Casting Plant (1,281 employees)
  - Indiana Transmission Plant I and II (2,439 employees)
  - Kokomo Engine Plant started production in 2022.
- StarPlus Energy, a joint venture between Stellantis and Samsung SDI
- BorgWarner
- GM Components Holdings LLC
- Haynes International
- Holder Mattress
- Syndicate Sales, Inc.
- Coca-Cola bottling plant
- Bona Vista (charity)

== Arts and culture ==
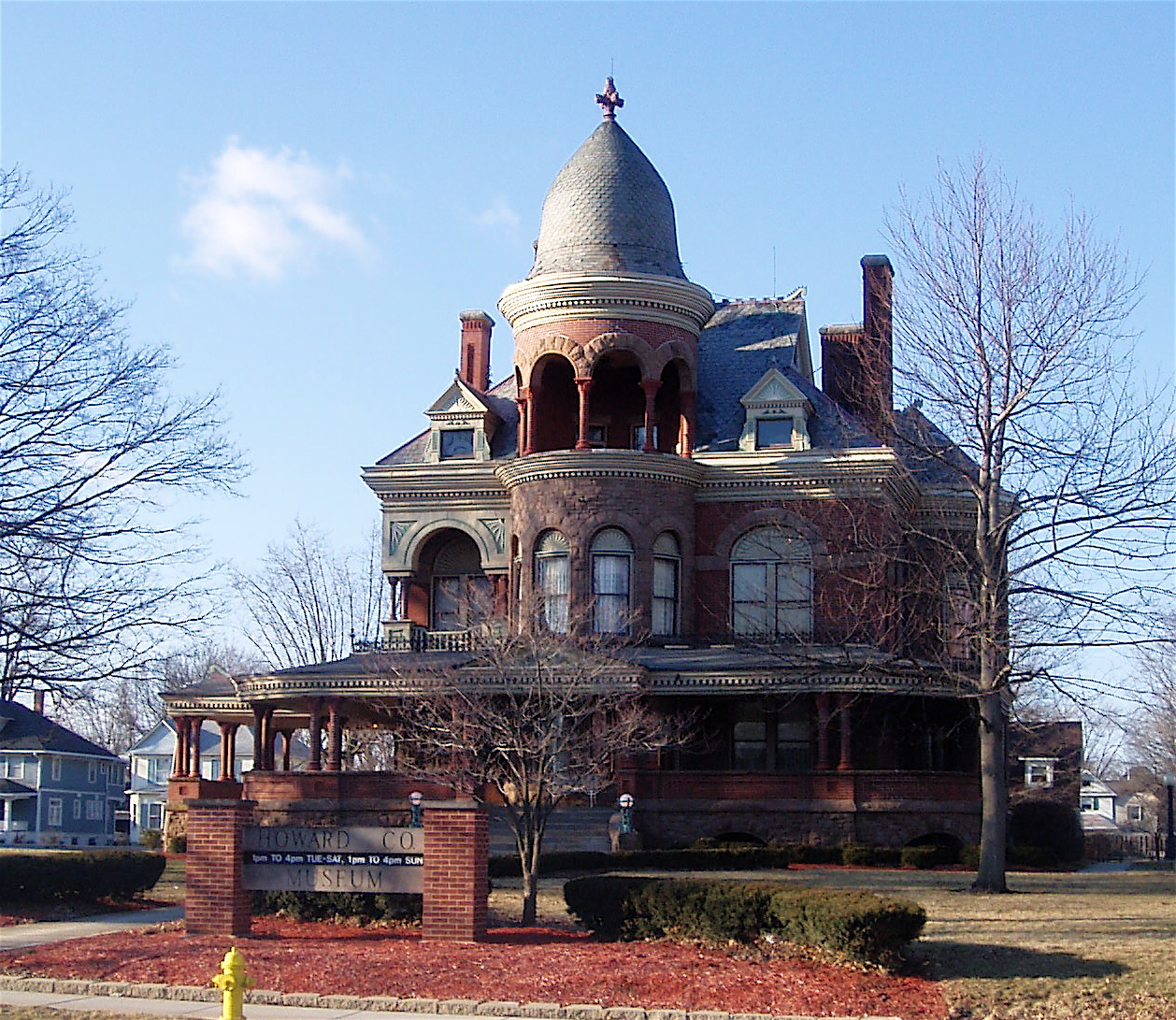
Seiberling Mansion

=== Historic buildings in Kokomo, Indiana ===
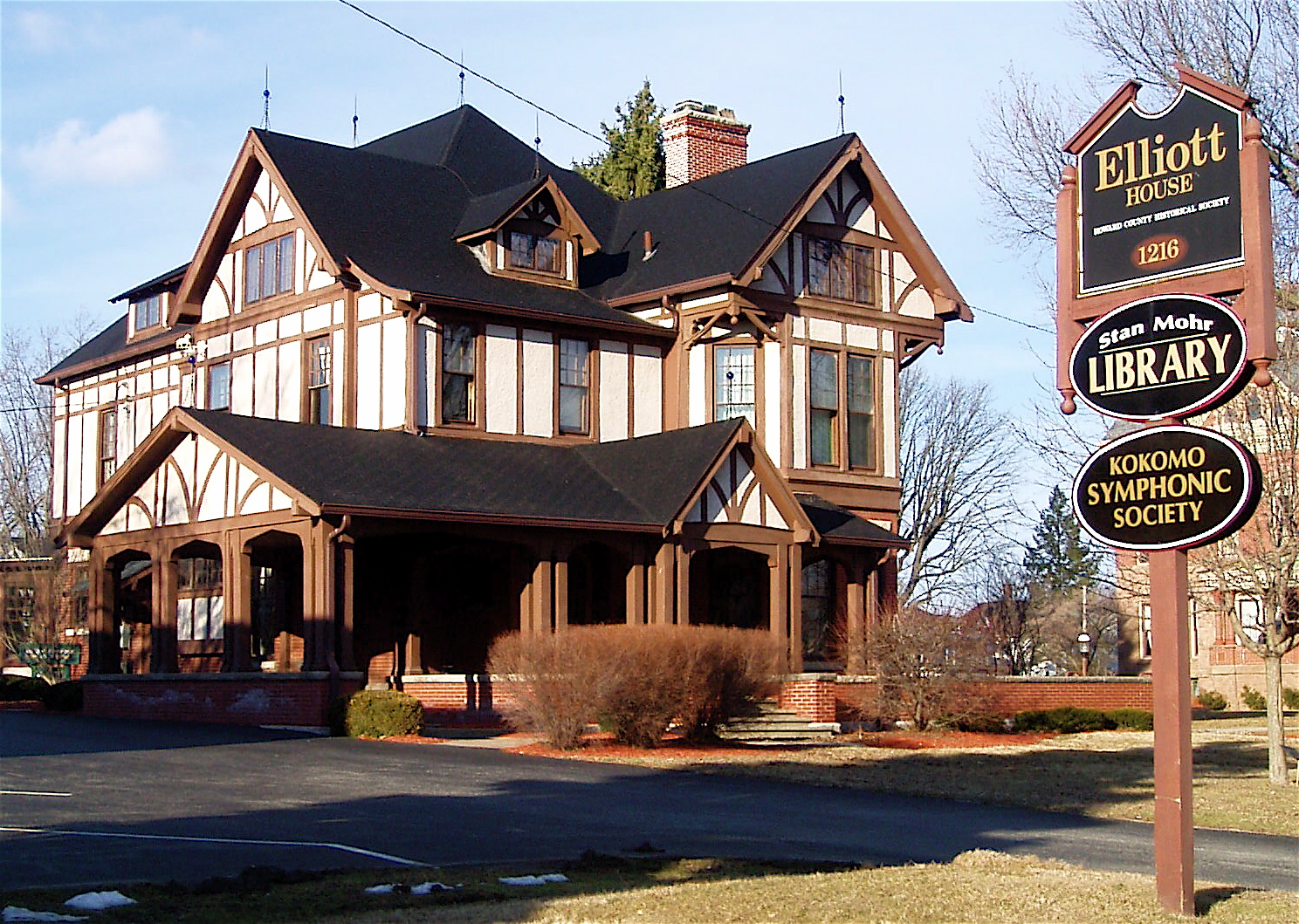
Photograph of the Elliott House in the Old Silk Stocking Historic District

These are all the buildings in Kokomo that are listed in the National Register of Historic Places:

- Elwood Haynes House was built as a residence and later adapted for use as office space.
- Kokomo City Building
- Kokomo Country Club Golf Course
- Kokomo Courthouse Square Historic District
- Kokomo High School and Memorial Gymnasium
- Lake Erie and Western Depot Historic District
- Learner Building
- Old Silk Stocking Historic District is the only neighborhood in the U.S. on the list.
- Seiberling Mansion was built as the residence of Monroe Seiberling, one of Kokomo's richest citizens.
- Howard Masonic Temple

=== Festivals ===
- Haynes-Apperson Festival, Independence Day weekend
- WeberFest, Foster Park
- Kokomo Con, October, Kokomo Event Center

== Sports teams ==
Professional sports
| Team | Sport | Current league | Established | Venue | Capacity |
| Kokomo Creek Chubs | Baseball | Prospect League | 2026 | Kokomo Municipal Stadium | 4,000 |
| Kokomo Bobkats | Basketball | The Basketball League | 2021 | Kokomo Memorial Gymnasium | 7,500 |
| Kokomo Bluebacks | Football | Central Midwest Football League | 2027* | Titan Stadium | ~1500 |
| Kokomo Vipers FC | Soccer | UPSL Premier Division | 2024 | Kokomo HS Soccer Field | Unknown |

*The Kokomo Bluebacks, a minor professional football team, will begin play in 2027.

Other current teams include the City of First Roller Girls (founded 2010) in the Women's Flat Track Derby Association, and the Indiana University of Kokomo Cougars compete in 12 sports in the NAIA in the River States Conference.

=== Former teams ===
- Indiana Mustangs, Mid Continental Football League (1991–2009), Mid States Football League (2010–2013)
- Kokomo Dodgers, Midwest League (1955–1961)
- Kokomo CFD Saints, semiprofessional baseball (1989–2002)
- Kokomo CFD Knights, semiprofessional baseball (2006–2007)
- Kokomo Mantis FC, soccer (2016)
- Kokomo Jackrabbits, baseball (2014–2025)

=== Sports venues ===
- Highland Park Stadium (CFD Investments Stadium)
- Kokomo Speedway
- Memorial Gymnasium
- Kokomo Municipal Stadium
- Wildcat Creek Soccer Complex
- Student Activities and Events Center

== Parks and recreation ==
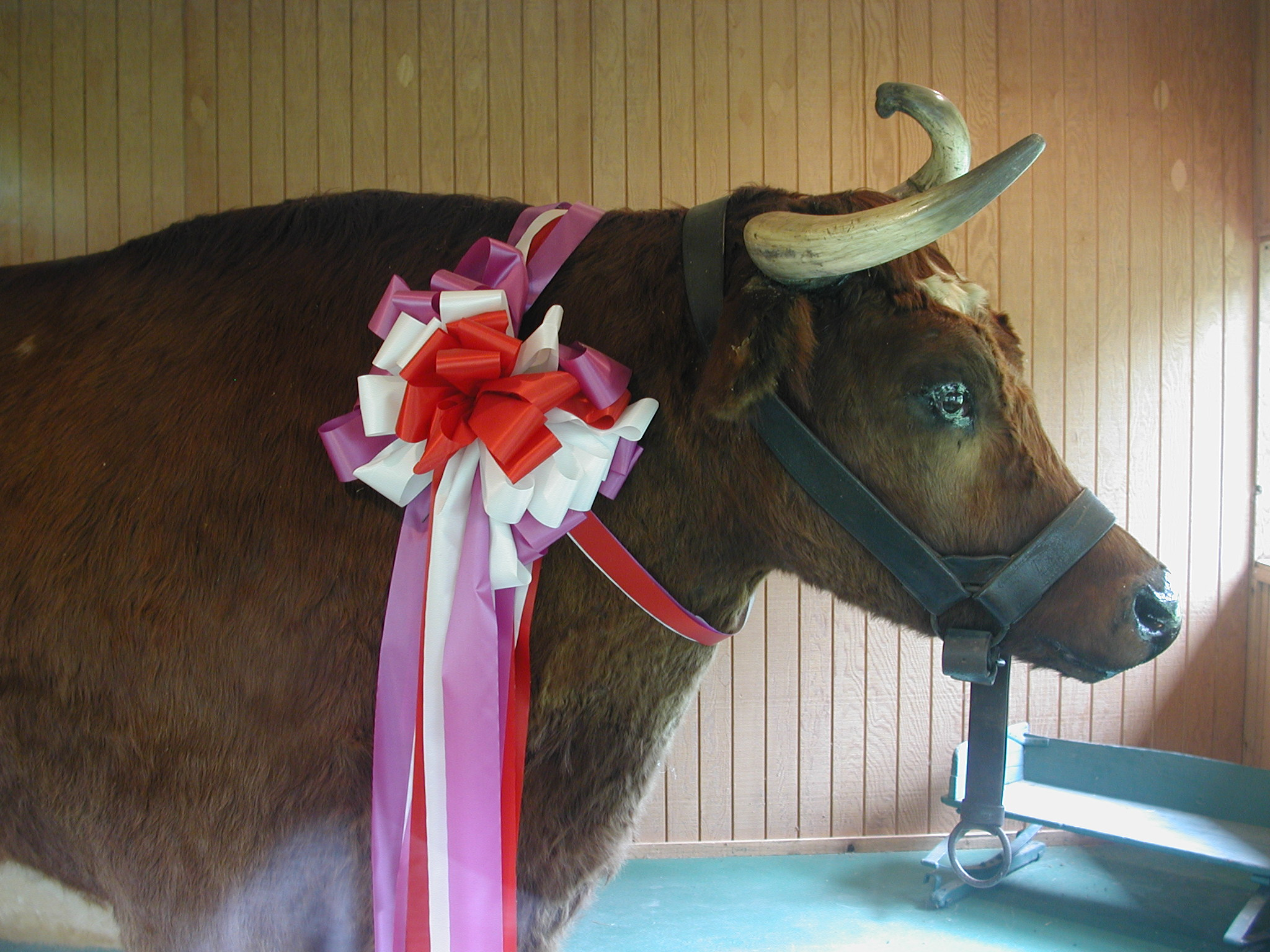
Old Ben – born in 1902 and acclaimed as "the largest steer in the world"

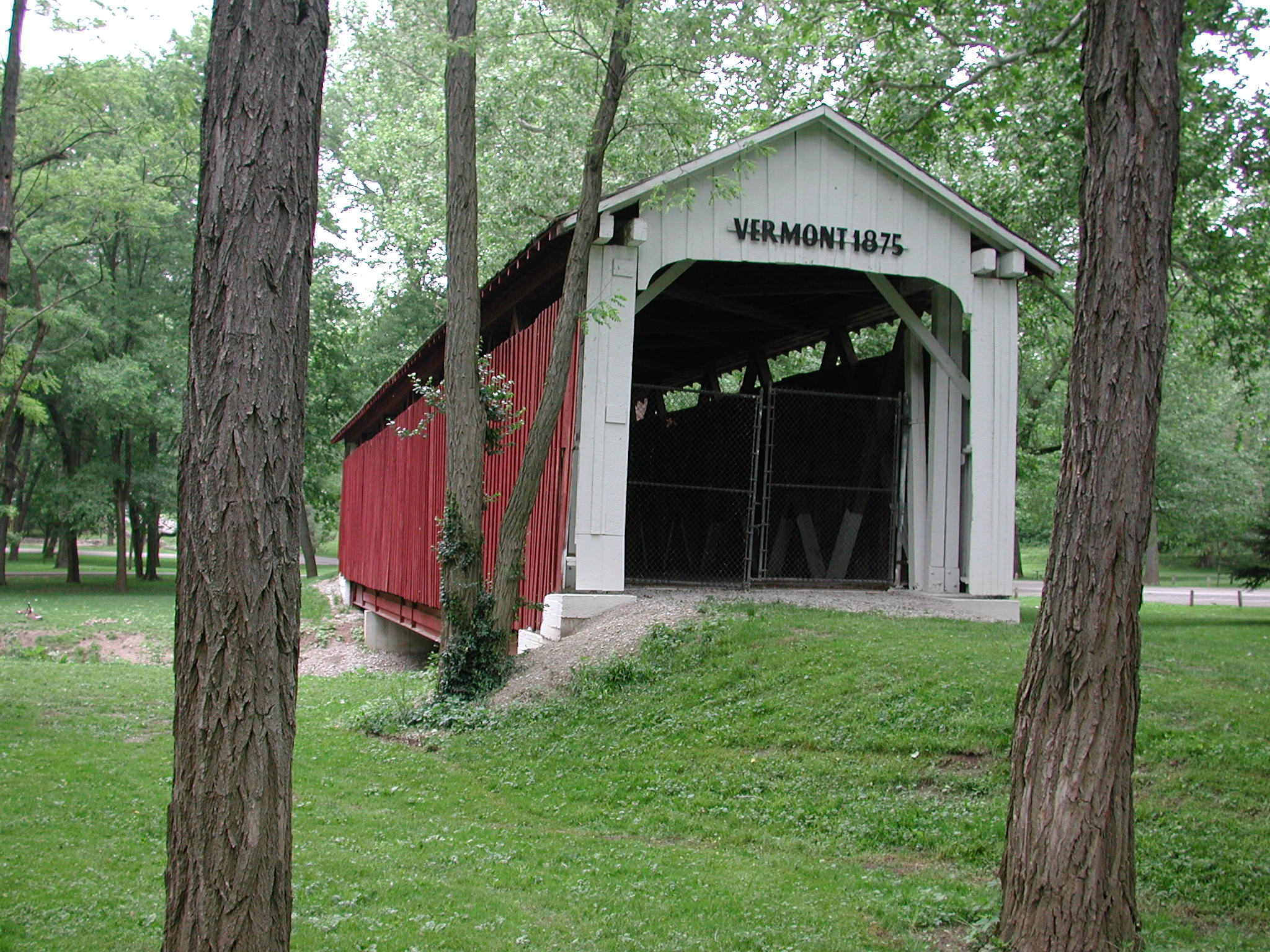
The Vermont Covered Bridge – another attraction to be found in Highland Park

- Chief Ma-Ko-Ko-Mo Burial and Monument, east of downtown Kokomo
- Elwood Haynes Museum, located next to Highland Park
- Foster Park
- Kokomo Country Club, golf club

=== Trails and paths ===
- Wildcat Creek Walk of Excellence – The Wildcat Walk of Excellence consists of over 3 miles (4.8 km) of paved trail that roughly follows the Wildcat Creek. The trail connects several of Kokomo's parks including Foster, Future, Waterworks, Miller-Highland and Mehlig Parks with a pedestrian bridge connecting Foster Park and the Kokomo Beach Family Aquatic Center.
- Industrial Heritage Trail – The Industrial Heritage Trail spans 5.7 miles (9.2 km) from SR931 on the city's south side and connects with the Nickel Plate Trail on the city's north side.
- Nickel Plate Trail – Currently connecting Rochester through Peru, to Kokomo and connecting with the Industrial Heritage Trail.
- The Cloverleaf Trail – This trail was added in 2018. It starts downtown and travels southwest along what was once part of the Toledo, St. Louis and Western Railroad.

== Government ==
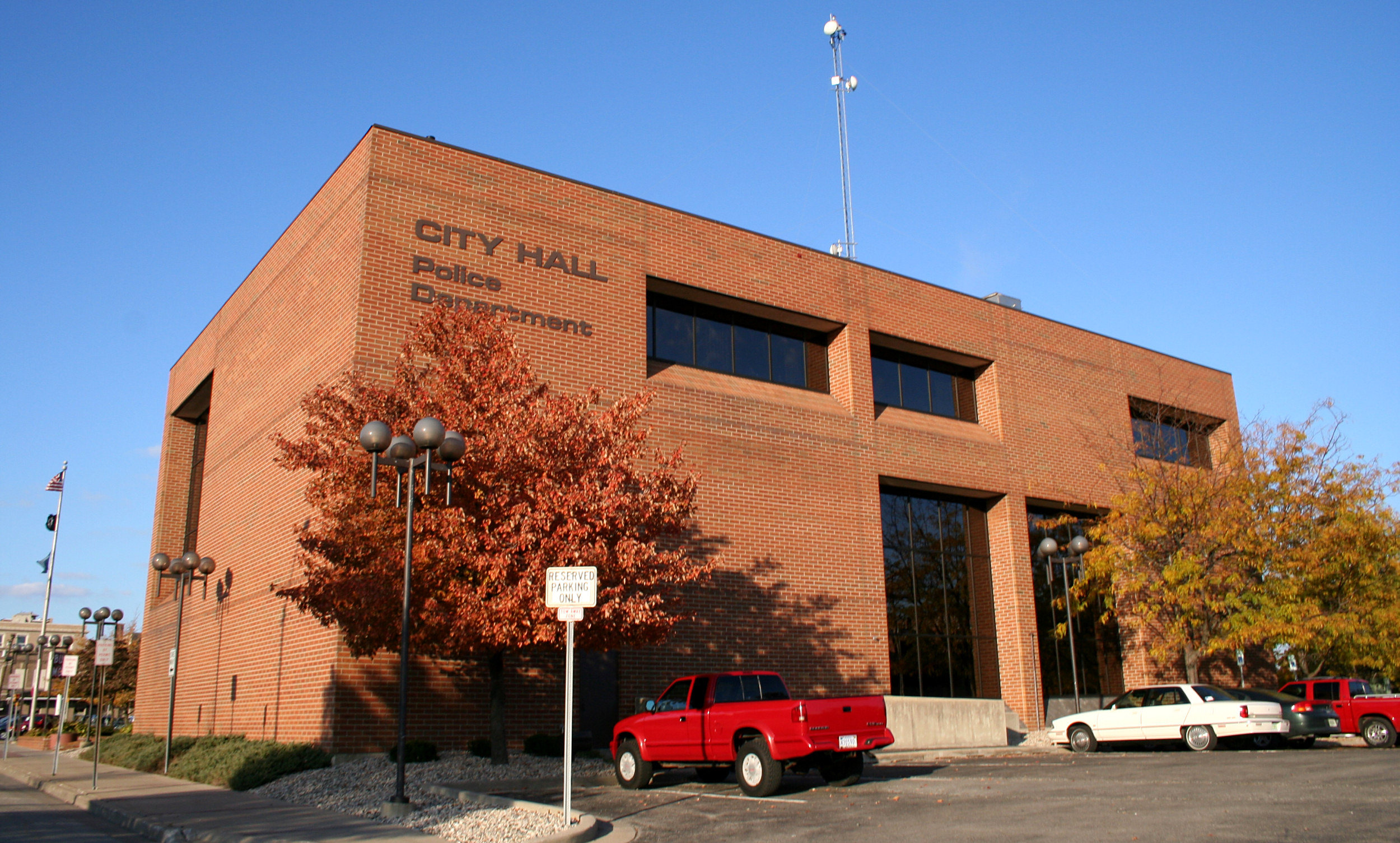
City Hall and Police Department building.

Kokomo's current mayor is Republican Tyler Moore, elected in November 2019. The previous mayor was Democrat Greg Goodnight (2008–2019) The two previous mayors before Goodnight were Matt McKillip (2004–2008) and Jim Trobaugh, both Republicans. The mayor is elected in a citywide vote. The city council is known as the Common Council. It consists of nine members. Six members are elected from individual districts. The other three are elected at-large.

== Education ==
=== Colleges and universities ===
- Howard College (1863–1872)
- Indiana University Kokomo (IUK)
- Indiana Wesleyan University – Kokomo Campus
- Ivy Tech Community College
- Purdue Polytechnic Institute Kokomo

==== Public school districts ====
- Kokomo-Center Township Consolidated School Corporation (K–12, most neighborhoods inside city limits) Kokomo High School (NCC)
- Northwestern School Corporation (K–12, northern part of the town) (HC)
- Taylor Community School Corporation (K–12, Indian Heights neighborhood) (HHC)
- Western School Corporation (K–12, Pine Valley/Jackson Morrow Park area) (HC)
- Eastern Howard School Corporation (K–12, Greentown and Eastern Howard County area) (HC)

==== Private schools ====
- Acacia Academy (K–8)
- Agape Garden Montessori School
- Children's Christian Academy
- Christian Heritage Academy
- F.D. Reese Christian Academy (K–3)
- Redeemer Lutheran School (K–8)
- Sts. Joan of Arc and St. Patrick Catholic School (K–8)
- Temple Christian School (K–12)
- Victory Christian Academy (K–12)

=== Public library ===
The city has a lending library, the Kokomo-Howard County Public Library.

== Media ==
=== Newspapers ===
- Kokomo Tribune, non-daily morning newspaper owned by Community Newspaper Holdings
- Kokomo Perspective, a locally owned weekly newspaper delivered every Tuesday or Wednesday that ceased publication in late 2021
- The Correspondent, student newspaper of Indiana University Kokomo and Purdue College of Technology at Kokomo
- The Kokomo Post, an online media publication owned by the Larison Company LLC

=== Television ===
- WTTK, CBS affiliate, channel 29 (satellite of Bloomington-licensed WTTV); transmits from Indianapolis's north side
- KGOV, Kokomo government access channel, channel 2

=== Radio ===
- WFIU-FM, Jazz, Classical, NPR – 106.1 FM
- WFRN-FM, Christian Radio – 93.7 FM
- WIWC-FM, Christian Radio – 91.7 FM
- WMYK-FM, Rock – 98.5 FM
- WSHW-FM, Contemporary Christian – 99.7 FM
- WJJD-LP, Christian Radio 74 Internationale – 101.3 FM
- WTSX-FM, Hip-Hop, Gospel, Soul, Rock-n-Roll, EDM & Top 40 – 104.9 FM
- WWKI-FM, Hit Country – 100.5 FM
- WZWZ-FM, Bright Adult Contemporary – 92.5 FM

== Infrastructure ==
=== Transportation ===
==== Airports ====
- Kokomo Municipal Airport

==== Highways ====
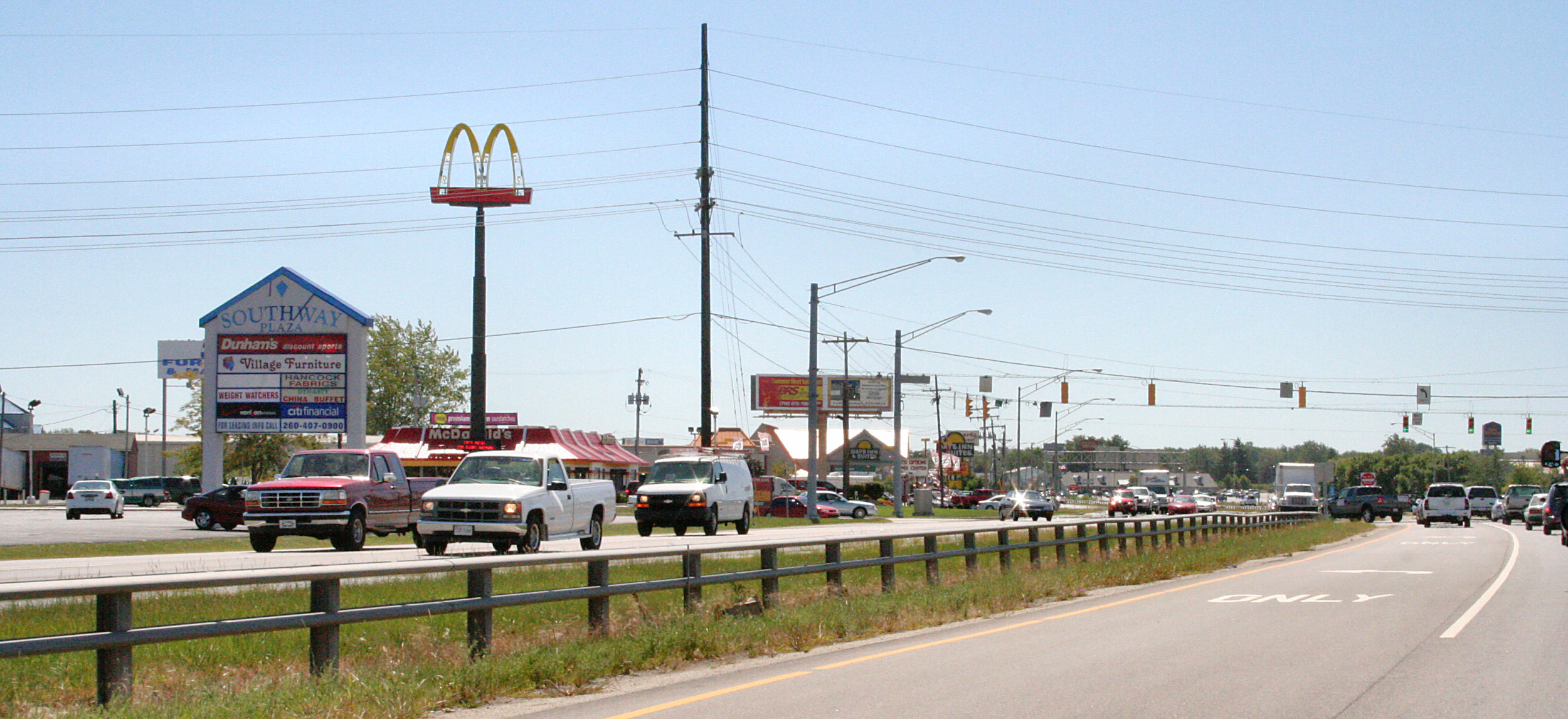
US 31 in Kokomo in 2005, now designated State Road 931 at Alto Rd. (CR 250 S)

- US 31 to South Bend (north) and Indianapolis (south)
- US 35 to Logansport (north) and Muncie (South)
- SR 931 (former US 31 through Kokomo)
- SR 19 to Kokomo Reservoir (north) and Tipton (south)
- SR 22 to Burlington (west) and Gas City (east)
- SR 26 to Lafayette (west) and Hartford City (east)

A major roadway traversing through Kokomo, nicknamed "stoplight city", US 31 had become one of the state's most congested roadways. In Howard County, 15 traffic signals are on US 31. As part of the state's Major Moves Project, US 31 was updated to bypass the city of Kokomo to the east. It has interchanges at SR 26, Boulevard, Markland Avenue, and Touby Pike, as well as where the current SR 931 meets the new US 31. A similar change was near South Bend and one will be near Indianapolis. The construction in Howard County cost roughly $340 million. Construction started on the County Road 200 South bridge on November 1, 2008. The new US 31 was opened November 27, 2013, at which time the existing roadway was renamed SR 931.

==== Railroads ====
- Central Railroad of Indianapolis
- Winamac Southern Railway (formerly part of the Columbus to Chicago Main Line)

The town for many years was a stop on the Pennsylvania Railroad's division running on a Chicago-Logansport-Richmond-Hamilton-Cincinnati itinerary. The last named train on the route was the overnight Buckeye, whose unnamed successor ended service in 1969. A day train counterpart on the route lingered on at least another year.

==== Bus service ====
- Miller Transportation provides bus service to Indianapolis and South Bend.
- Kokomo City-Line Trolley A fixed-route transportation system, five bus routes run past a total of exactly 275 stops, passing each stop once every hour, from 6:30 am to 7:00 pm, weekdays. The buses also have wireless internet for riders, which like the buses, is free to riders.

=== Groundwater contamination ===
In 1995, the Indiana American Water treatment facility found groundwater beneath the city contaminated with trace amounts of vinyl chloride. In 2007, the Indiana Department of Environmental Management found groundwater at four municipal wells containing vinyl chloride at levels exceeding the EPA maximum contaminant level in raw water.

In 2011, it found one of the monitoring wells, not owned or used by Indiana American Water, had amounts of vinyl chloride that were more than 2,500 times the maximum level for drinking water. IDEM has identified 14 facilities that handle chlorinated solvents and could be sources to the contamination plume. Some of these potential sources are currently being managed under other authorities, but no cleanup approach is focusing on the groundwater plume. Water from several well fields in Kokomo are blended and treated prior to distribution. A water treatment system has been successfully removing the vinyl chloride from the finished drinking water, but this is not a permanent solution to address the contaminated groundwater.

The site was proposed to the National Priorities List and added to the Superfund in March 2015. No cleanup plan is yet in effect.

=== Healthcare ===
- Ascension St. Vincent Kokomo, opened in 1913 part of Ascension (healthcare system).
- Community Howard Regional Health, incorporated in 1958

=== Entertainment ===
Kokomo has a 12-screen movie theater, called AMC Showplace Kokomo 12, located on 1530 East Boulevard. In addition to AMC, Kokomo also has several forms of live entertainment, including choirs, a Park Band Association, and three live theatres.

=== Shopping ===
The city's major mall is Markland Mall, which features Target. The Kokomo Town Center, the former Kokomo Mall, underwent a major renovation in 2011 when it became an outdoor mall.

== Notable people ==
- Brandon Beachy, MLB pitcher Los Angeles Dodgers, Northwestern High School (Indiana) graduate
- Alicia Berneche, operatic soprano
- Rupert Boneham, Libertarian candidate for Indiana governor in 2012
- Norman Bridwell, author of the Clifford the Big Red Dog children's books
- Quautico (Tico) Brown, former Continental Basketball Association player
- Steve Butler, six-time Sprint Car national champion
- Kaitlyn Christopher, Miss Indiana USA 2005
- Dave Darland, auto racer
- Rowdy Elliott, baseball player
- Shawn Fain, president of United Auto Workers
- Elwood Haynes, inventor, automotive pioneer
- Bud Hillis, U.S. representative
- Margaret Hillis, pianist, founder of Chicago Symphony Chorus
- Honorée Fanonne Jeffers, author
- Don Johnson, professional bowler, PBA Hall of Fame member
- Opha May Johnson, USMC first female Marine
- Yasmine K. Kasem (born 1993) American visual artist
- Nellie Keeler, child circus performer
- Steve Kroft, 60 Minutes correspondent
- Jim "Goose" Ligon, former ABA basketball player
- Strother Martin, actor
- Clay Myers, photographer and animal-welfare advocate
- Kent C. Nelson, past CEO of United Parcel Service
- John O'Banion, singer
- Ray Porter, actor, portrayed Darkseid in Zack Snyder’s Justice League
- Jack Purvis, jazz musician
- Jane Randolph, actress, grew up in Kokomo
- Jimmy Rayl, "Splendid Splinter," Indiana Pacers 1967–1969, Indiana University (noted on Superior St.)
- Robert S. Richardson, astronomer
- Tod Sloan, jockey
- Tavis Smiley, PBS presenter
- "Sylvia" (Sylvia Jane Kirby), country music singer
- Joe Thatcher, pitcher for MLB Chicago Cubs
- Pat Underwood, former MLB pitcher, Detroit Tigers
- Tom Underwood, former MLB pitcher
- William N. Vaile, congressman
- Gertrude Vaile (1878–1954), social worker
- Ryan White, AIDS activist
- Anna Mae Winburn, African American vocalist and jazz bandleader

== In popular culture ==
- The Kid from Kokomo (1939; also sometimes called Broadway Cavalier) is a comedy film about an orphan from Kokomo who refuses to box until his mother is found. The film was based on a story by Dalton Trumbo.
- Kokomo is the setting of Allan Dwan's nostalgic 1953 musical Sweethearts on Parade.
- In craps, rolling a four is sometimes referred to as "Little Joe from Kokomo", after "little" Joe Fohn, a famous bowler in the 1920s who apparently had a four step delivery.
- "Kokomo, IN" is the title of a song from Japanese Breakfast's critically acclaimed third album, Jubilee.
- Most of the 1987 film Terror Squad was filmed in Kokomo.
- Season one, episode two of the documentary television show Neighbors aired in February 2026, featuring a dispute between neighbors Darrell and Trever that takes place in Kokomo. The episode also features an interview with Kokomo Tribune journalist Tyler Juranovich and an article he authored about the zoning dispute, which appeared on the front page of the newspaper. Another front-page headline and article, authored by journalist Kelly Lafferty Gerber, also appears in the episode.
- Danny, the optimistic protagonist of the 1997 Warner Bros. animated musical film Cats Don't Dance, is a singing and dancing cat that leaves his hometown of Kokomo to pursue stardom in 1930s Hollywood.

== See also ==
- National Register of Historic Places listings in Howard County, Indiana

== Bibliography ==
- Pollard, Otis C. (1909). Early Days of Kokomo. Vol. I. Indianapolis: B.F. Bowen & Co.
- Morrow, Jackson (1909). History of Howard County. Vol. I. Indianapolis: B.F. Bowen & Co.
