= Kokomo Courthouse Square Historic District =

Historic district in Indiana, United States

- U.S. National Register of Historic Places
- U.S. Historic district
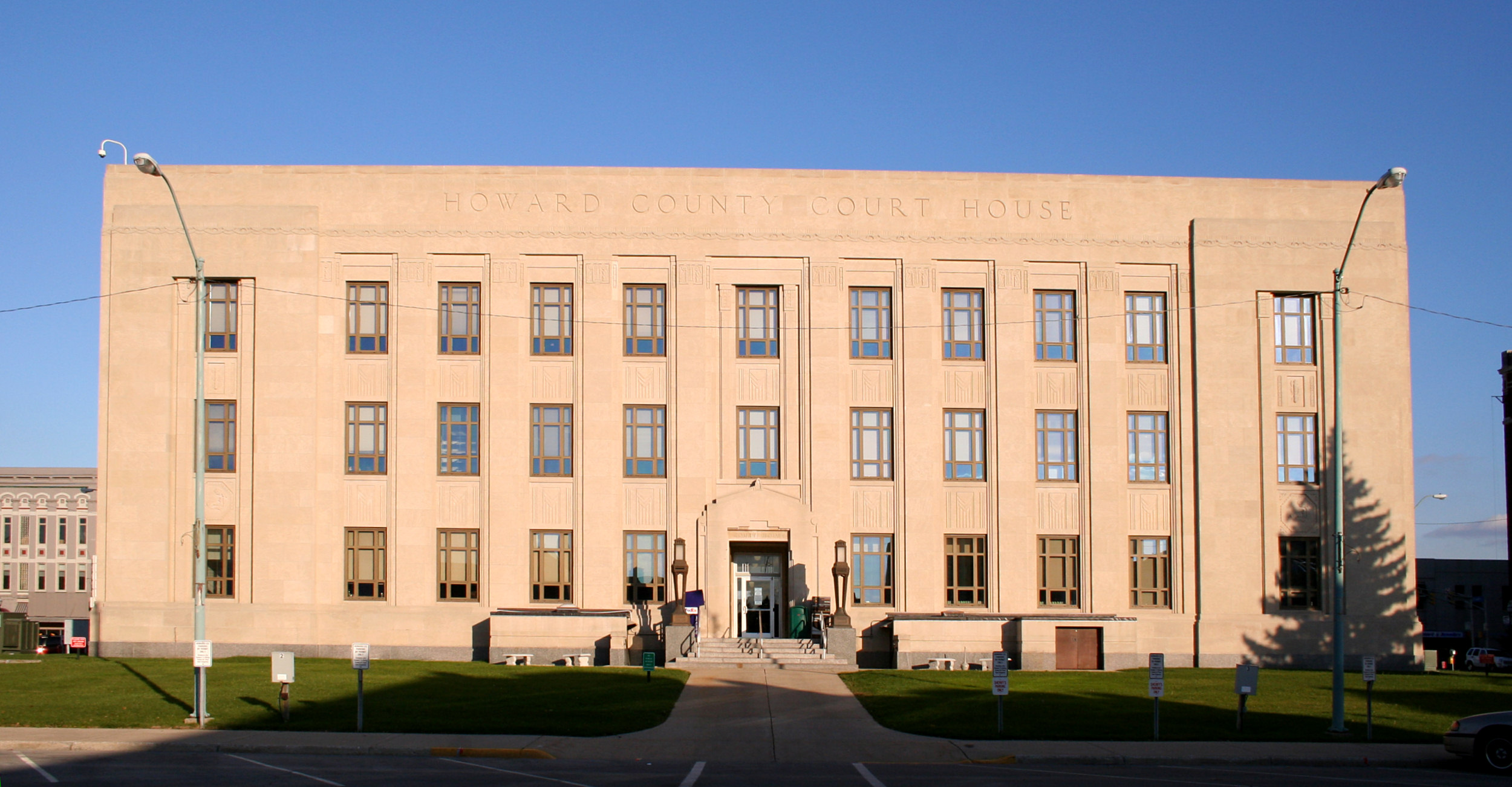
- Howard County Courthouse, October 2005

- Location within Indiana Location within the United States
- Location: Bounded by Taylor St. on the N., Market St. on the E., Superior St. on the S., Washington St. on the W., Kokomo, Indiana
- Coordinates: 40°29′13″N 86°07′55″W
- Area: 39 acres (16 ha)
- Built: 1886
- Architect: Cook, Oscar F.
- Architectural style: Italianate, Queen Anne
- NRHP reference No.: 08001209
- Added to NRHP: December 22, 2008

Kokomo Courthouse Square Historic District is a national historic district located at Kokomo, Indiana. The district includes 60 contributing buildings, one contributing structure, and one contributing object in the central business district of Kokomo. It developed between about 1870 and 1937 and includes notable examples of Italianate, Queen Anne, and Romanesque Revival style architecture. Notable buildings include the Draper Block (1904), Wilson Block (c. 1895), College Building (1909), Howard County Courthouse (1937), and a Railroad Watchman Tower (c. 1940).

It was listed on the National Register of Historic Places in 2008.
