= Continental Steel Corporation =

United States steel producer

Coordinates: 40°28′26″N 86°08′45″W

The Continental Steel Corporation was a United States steel producer from 1927 until 1986. The company was created on June 21, 1927, through the merger of the Kokomo Steel and Wire Company (founded in Kokomo, Indiana, in 1901) with the Superior Sheet Steel Company of Canton, Ohio, and the Chapman Price Steel Company of Indianapolis. Among the original eleven directors was John E. Fredrick, who had been an organizer of the Kokomo Fence Machine Company in 1896 and had served on the board of directors of the Kokomo Steel and Wire Company. Fredrick served as first Chairman of the Board of Continental Steel, whose headquarters were established in Kokomo. The Kokomo operations of this corporation, however, continued to employ the Kokomo Steel and Wire name until 1944. Continental Steel was dissolved in 1986, due to bankruptcy.

== Early operations ==
Within a year of its founding, the various plants of Continental Steel employed 2288 individuals, a new bar mill was in operation, and the firm was preparing to produce its first steel. Continental Steel would become, at one time, the largest employer in Kokomo, with a workforce approximating 3000 at its peak. In 1929, the construction of a sheet rolling plant and sheet galvanizing units at Kokomo were authorized, with production in the sheet mill beginning that summer. Continental was able to surmount the rigors of the Great Depression of the 1930s, and in 1936 its stocks, listed on the Chicago Stock Exchange since 1929, were admitted on the New York Stock Exchange. Its earnings for 1935 had reached over one million dollars, with total assets valued at more than $18,000,000. During the Second World War Continental produced large tonnages of barbed wire, nails and sheet steel for military use, and it provided material for products manufactured by defense industries. These included aerial bombs, fuel containers and landing mats for air strips.

== Expansion and growth ==
In 1946 and 1947, Continental Steel sold off its Canton, Ohio and Indianapolis sheet mill facilities, having decided to focus on the manufacture of finished products at Kokomo. The 1950s witnessed considerable expansion: a new continuous rod mill started operations in 1953, a welded fabric department was housed in a new facility in 1955; the mail mill was modernized, and a new nail warehouse was built in 1957; 1959 saw the production of a new item, high carbon wire. By 1963, Continental Steel's open hearth capacity had grown to 420,000 net tons through the enlargement of existing furnaces. The prospering company was producing a wide range of products including fences, gates, posts, welded wire fabric, nails, a variety of wires, clothes lines rivets, and copper steel (Konik) sheets.

== Penn-Dixie Corporation take-over ==
An important turning point for the company took place in the late 1960s. In 1968, Jerome Castle, president of the Penn-Dixie Cement Corporation of New York, acknowledged that his company was in the process of purchasing hundreds of thousands of shares of Continental Steel; by 1969, a takeover was completed and the Kokomo operations formally took on the Penn-Dixie name five years later. This takeover was part of a current trend within the American steel industry in which individual steel companies were merged with conglomerates. Ten such mergers took place in 1968 and 1969, including the absorption of Jones and Laughlin Steel by the Ling-Temco-Vought Corporation, and the merger of Youngstown Steel with the Lykes Corporation.

== Challenges and setbacks ==
The next decade and a half proved to be a period of tremendous challenges and setbacks for Continental Steel and for the American steel industry as a whole. Despite a worldwide steel boom in 1973–1974, American producers were confronted by labor disputes, the costs of modernizing an aging infrastructure, environmental issues and foreign competition from Europe and Japan. In 1971 Continental Steel experienced a contentious strike involving the issue of pension funds. Critics accused Castle of mismanagement and of wresting maximum profits from operations without investing sufficient capital into expansion and modernization. In 1977, Castle was dismissed from his posts at Penn-Dixie for selling Florida swampland to the corporation far above its actual worth. Two years later, he was convicted of defrauding Penn-Dixie in this conspiracy and sentenced to 15 months in prison.

== Bankruptcies and demise ==
Troubles continued to plague Penn-Dixie. In 1980, the firm filed for Chapter 11 reorganization bankruptcy. On January 29, 1982, the company was able to obtain concessions from its United Steelworkers local that reduced labor costs by $2 an hour, and it agreed to pass on the savings to its employees once the company attained profitability. In March 1982, it emerged from bankruptcy, having shed all its operations with the exception of the steel division. The company reorganized under the name Continental Steel Corporation, with its headquarters being relocated from New York to Kokomo. Expenditures were made in 1984–1985 on a new continuous rod mill and a continuous billet caster in hope that this would salvage the company, but the business continued to decline. In late 1985, Continental Steel again sought Chapter 11 bankruptcy, hoping for another opportunity to reorganize, but in February of the following year its creditors were successful in having the Chapter 11 reorganization converted to Chapter 7 liquidation. On February 17, 1986, Continental Steel shut down what remained of its operations in Kokomo, leaving over 700 workers jobless.

== Pension and environmental controversies ==
Even after its closing Continental Steel generated controversy. Embittered workers, who had earlier been led by management to believe that their pensions were secure, discovered that this was not the case. The dispute that ensued was only partially resolved through compensation provided by the Federal Pension Benefit Guaranty Corporation.

In its last few years of operation, Continental Steel had encountered problems with the Indiana Department of Environmental Management (IDEM) and the federal Environmental Protection Agency (EPA) due to alleged improper disposal of hazardous wastes and PCBs, and in March 1989, the 183-acre (0.74 km^{2}) area that it had occupied was declared a Superfund site, with the EPA and IDEM sharing responsibilities for a massive, costly cleanup which would include the decontamination and demolition of its plant buildings in 1999–2000. While considerable progress has been made over the past two decades, decontamination efforts continue, accompanied by vigorous discussion and debate in Kokomo concerning what use might be made of this property in the future.

In 2016, the site was converted into a solar energy park, which began operating on December 29, 2016.
