= Learner Building =

- U.S. National Register of Historic Places
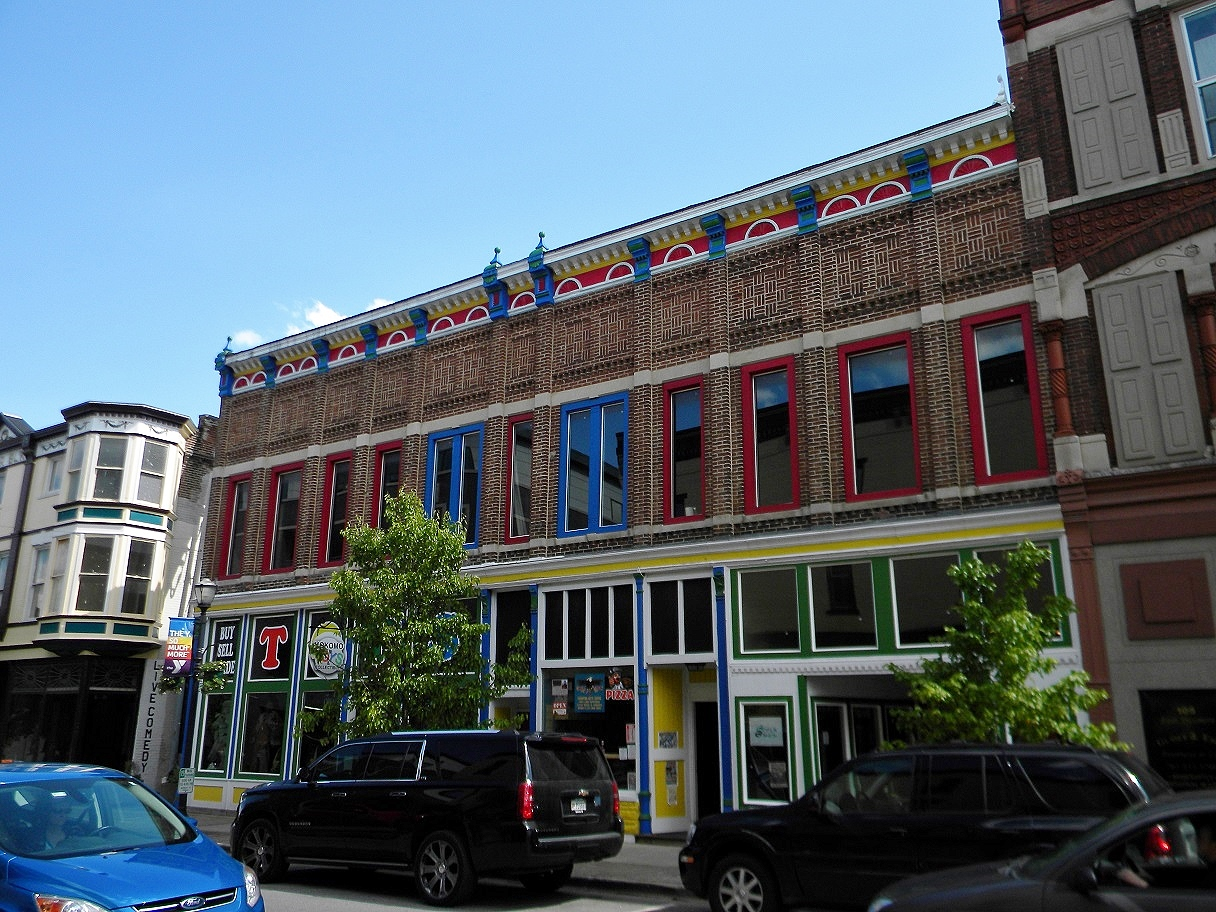

- Location within Indiana Location within the United States
- Location: 107-111 E. Sycamore St., Kokomo, Indiana
- Coordinates: 40°29′10″N 86°7′50″W
- Area: less than one acre
- Built: c. 1904
- Architectural style: Early Commercial, Commercial Vernacular
- NRHP reference No.: 84001055
- Added to NRHP: September 20, 1984

Learner Building is a historic commercial building located in Kokomo, Indiana. It was built by John Wesley Learner around 1904, and is a two-story, red brick building with a sloping flat roof. Learner was a prominent businessman in Kokomo, though he himself never had a business in the building. The Learner Building is 11 bays wide and has three commercial storefronts. It is a good example of late-19th century commercial architecture and features bold vertical brick patterns and limestone coursing.

It was listed on the National Register of Historic Places in 1984.
