= Kokomo Country Club =

The Kokomo Country Club
- Interactive map of The Kokomo Country Club

Club information
- Location: Kokomo, Indiana
- Established: 1904
- Type: Private
- Owner: Kokomo Country Club, Inc.
- Total holes: 18
- Greens: Blue
- Fairways: Bent
- Website: http://www.kokomocountryclub.com
- Designed by: William H. Diddel
- Par: 70
- Length: 6060 yd.
- Course rating: 69.5
- Slope rating: 118
- Course record: 58 ,
- Kokomo County Club Golf Course
- U.S. National Register of Historic Places
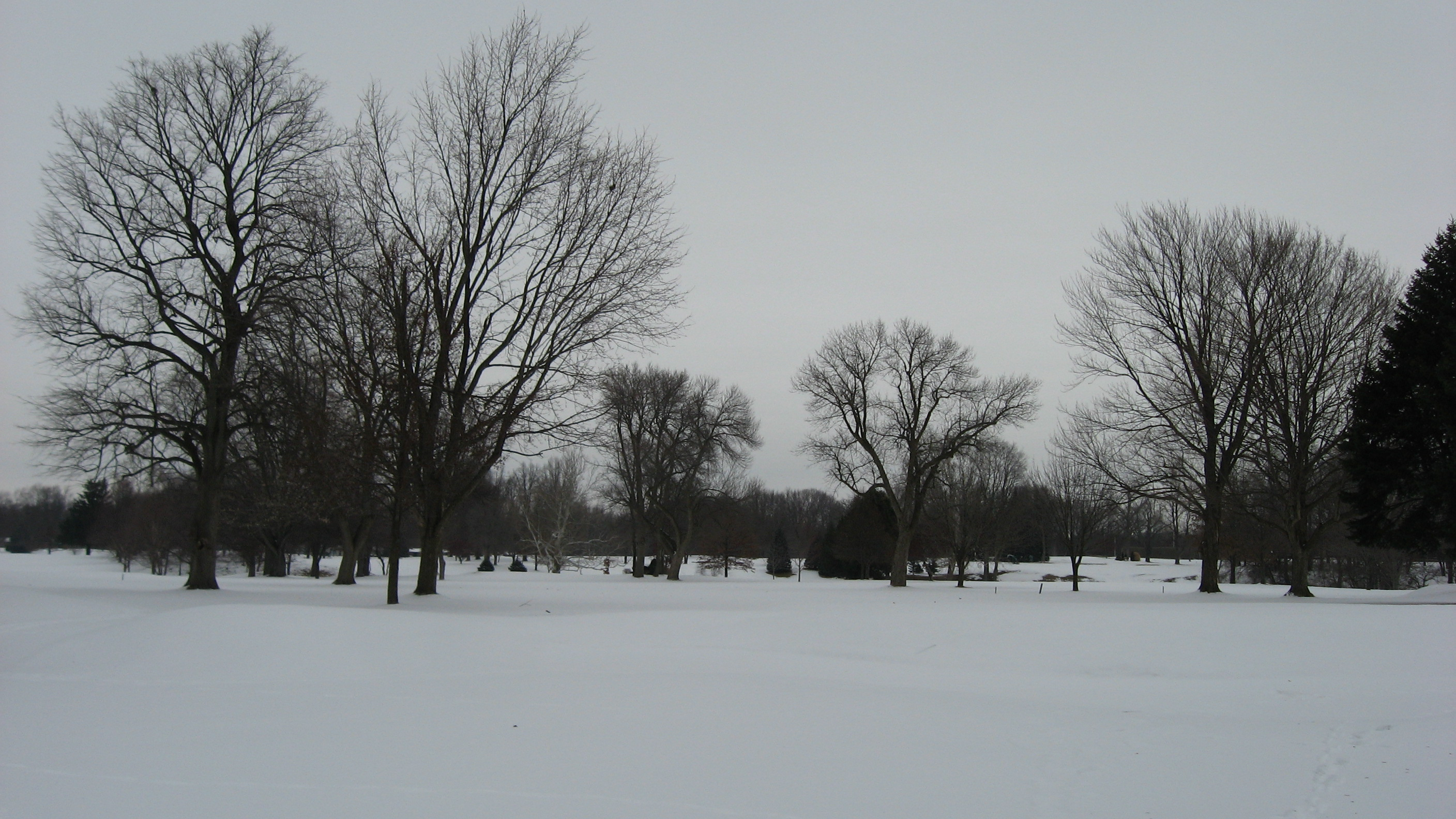
- The course in winter

- Location within Indiana Location within the United States
- Location: 1801 Country Club Dr., Kokomo, Indiana
- Coordinates: 40°27′49″N 86°08′33″W
- Area: 101 acres (41 ha)
- Built: 1904
- Built by: Diddel, William H.
- NRHP reference No.: 06000854
- Added to NRHP: September 20, 2006

Kokomo Country Club is a private country club in Kokomo, Indiana. The club was established on June 13, 1904, to provide a course for local golf enthusiasts. The course was the home course of Indiana Golf Hall of Fame Member Robert Resner.

The course was added to the National Register of Historic Places on September 20, 2006.
