= Frankfort and Kokomo Railroad =

Defunct railroad company

Map

The Frankfort and Kokomo Railroad was a small railroad company that operated approximately 25 miles (40 km) of track between the Indiana cities of Frankfort and Kokomo. The F&K's rail line, laid down in 1873, was generally of poor condition and made the cars that traveled along it jog from side to side, leading to its nickname "The Rabbit Track Line". The first train cars made the trip between the two cities on May 28, 1874.

In 1881 the F&K Railroad was converted from 4 ft 8 1/2 in (1,435 mm) standard gauge to 3 ft (914 mm) narrow gauge and consolidated into the Toledo, Cincinnati and St. Louis Railroad. In 1886, it was returned to 4 ft 8 1/2 in (1,435 mm) standard gauge under the ownership of the Toledo, St. Louis and Kansas City Railroad, later renamed the Toledo, St. Louis and Western Railroad and commonly known as the "Clover Leaf".
