= Ma-Ko-Ko-Mo =

Native American leader

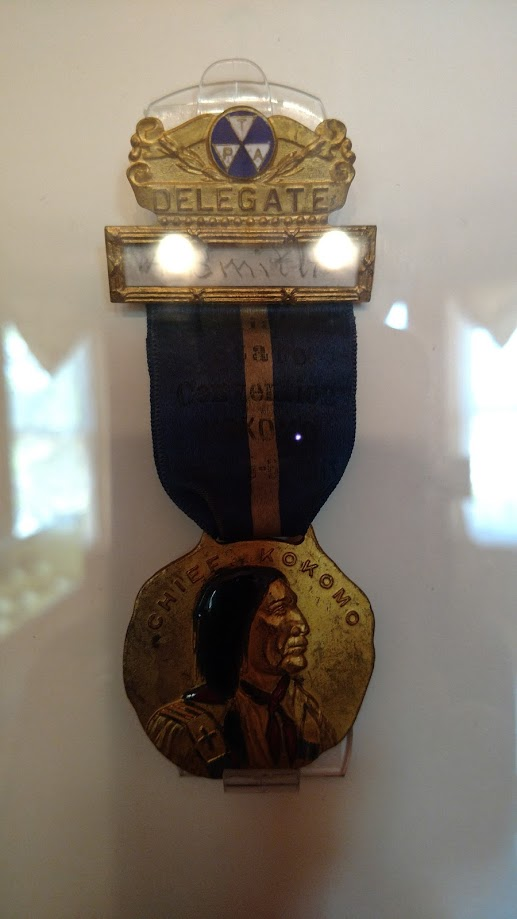
- Ma-Ko-Ko-Mo is depicted in a fictionalized manner on a medallion created by the Travelers' Protective Association for their 1916 meeting in Kokomo, Indiana. The medallion inaccurately portrays him wearing the attire of a Native American chieftain from the western plains, despite consistent descriptions of him as a Miami leader.
- Born: Miami tribe territory
- Other name: The name "Ma-Ko-Ko-Mo" means "The Bear"
- Occupation: Tribal leader
- Known for: Leadership in the Miami tribe and influence on the naming of Kokomo, Indiana
- Title: Chief of the Miami tribe

Kokomo, whose name is also sometimes given as Koh-Koh-Mah, Co-come-wah, Ma-Ko-Ko-Mo, or Kokomoko, was a Native American man of the Miami tribe who lived in northern Indiana at some point probably in the early nineteenth century. The city of Kokomo, Indiana is named after him. David Foster, the founder of the city of Kokomo, is widely quoted as having said, "It was the orneriest town on earth, so I named it after the orneriest Indian on earth—called it Kokomo," but this anecdote may be apocryphal, and it is unclear whether Foster was the one who proposed the name for the city at all.

The etymology of Kokomo's name is unknown; none of the numerous explanations that have been put forward are viable. According to one set of legends, Kokomo was the "last of the fighting chiefs" of Miami, a 7-foot (2.1 m)-tall man of immense physical strength and great cunning under whose leadership his tribe flourished. Another set of legends, however, portrays him as not a chief at all, but an ordinary, lazy, dishonest, wife-beating drunkard of such poor reputation that the Miami disowned him. His putative remains are buried in Pioneer Cemetery, where a monument stands in his honor.

== Name ==
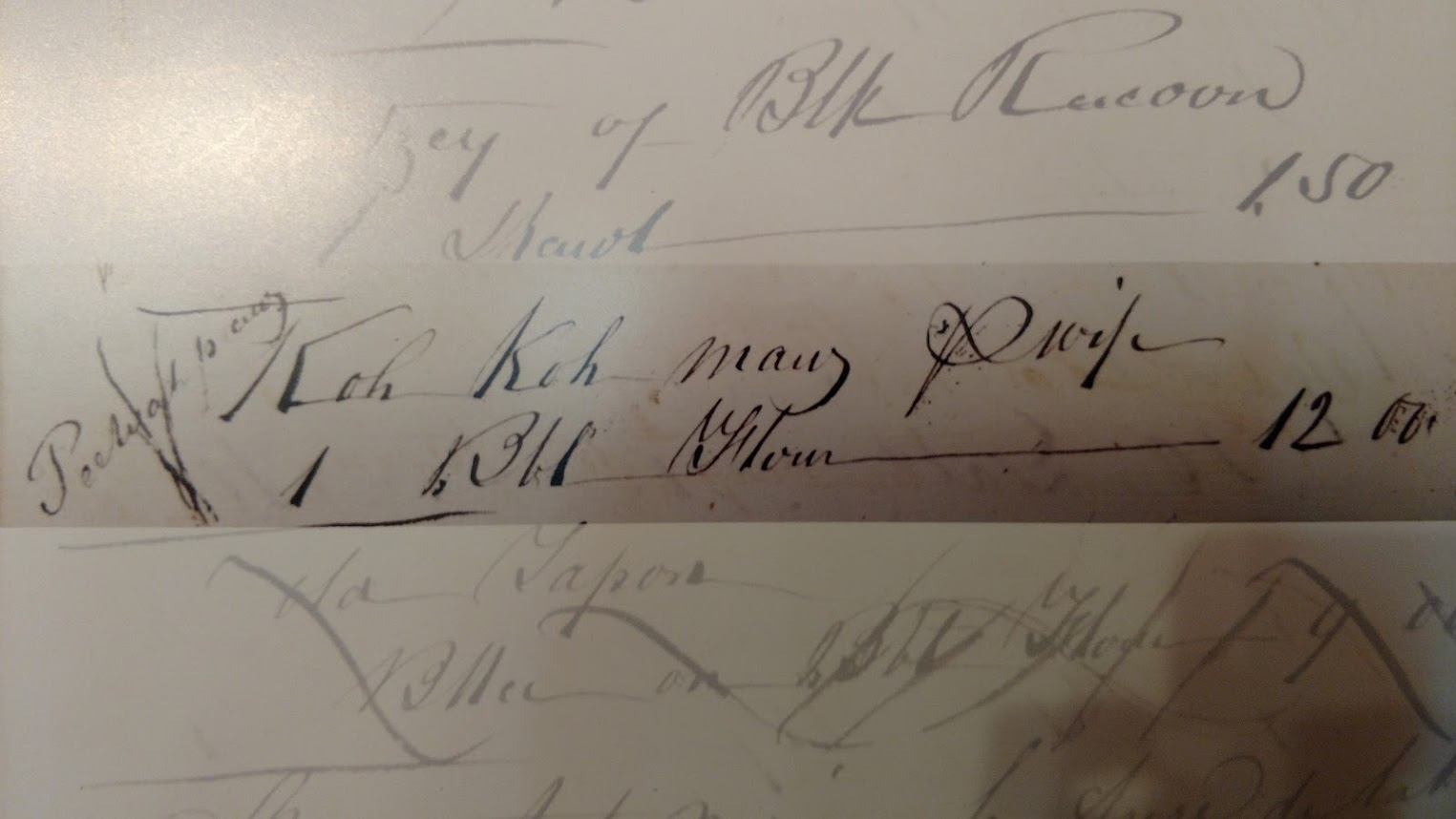
The name Koh Koh Maw appears in the June 27, 1838, entry of the ledger for Francis Godfroy's trading post in Mississinewa, Indiana. The man bearing the name was charged twelve dollars for a barrel of flour.

There are only two pieces of documentary evidence of Miami men with names resembling the name Kokomo. The earliest attestation of the name comes from the Treaty at the Forks of the Wabash from 1834, on which a Miami man by the name of "Co-come-wah" is listed as a signatory. This individual has been traditionally identified by the Miami people as Kokomo himself. The only other piece of documentary evidence of Kokomo as a real Miami name is a single entry from the ledger of Francis Godfroy's Mississinewa River trading post dated to June 27, 1838, recording that an individual named "Koh Koh maw", accompanied by his unnamed wife, paid twelve dollars for a barrel of flour on that date.

The meaning of the name Kokomo is unknown. Kiilhsoohkwa (lived 1810 – 1915), the granddaughter of the Miami chief Little Turtle and a monolingual speaker of the Miami language, stated that she was familiar with the name Kō-káhm-ah, but that she did not know what the name meant. During an interview with Jacob Dunn, an amateur linguist, Gabriel Godfroy (lived c. 1830 – 1910), the youngest son of Francis Godfroy, related the name Kokomo to the Miami verb meaning 'to dive', but the words are not linguistically related.

Traditionally, the name has been said to be the Miami word for 'black walnut', but this is not the case. It has alternatively been interpreted as meaning 'he-bear' or 'she-bear' in Miami, but it does not resemble any of the known Miami words for 'bear'. Another popular interpretation has claimed that it is the Miami word for 'old woman' or 'grandmother', but it is not either of these, and it would be implausible for a man to have a name with either of these meanings.

George Ironstrack, a citizen of the Miami Tribe of Oklahoma and the assistant director and program director of the Education and Outreach Office of the Myaamia Center at Miami University in Ohio, has warned against attempts to deduce the etymology of the name Kokomo, stating that while Kokomo was a historical figure, "The origin of the name 'Kokomo' is fuzzier and supported only by bad history." David Costa, a linguist at the Language Research Office at the Myaamia Center, states, "The fact that a fluent Miami speaker like Kiilhsoohkwa knew the person 'Kokomo' but had no idea what the name meant may well indicate that it's not even a Miami word."

== Legends ==
=== Early settlers' tales ===
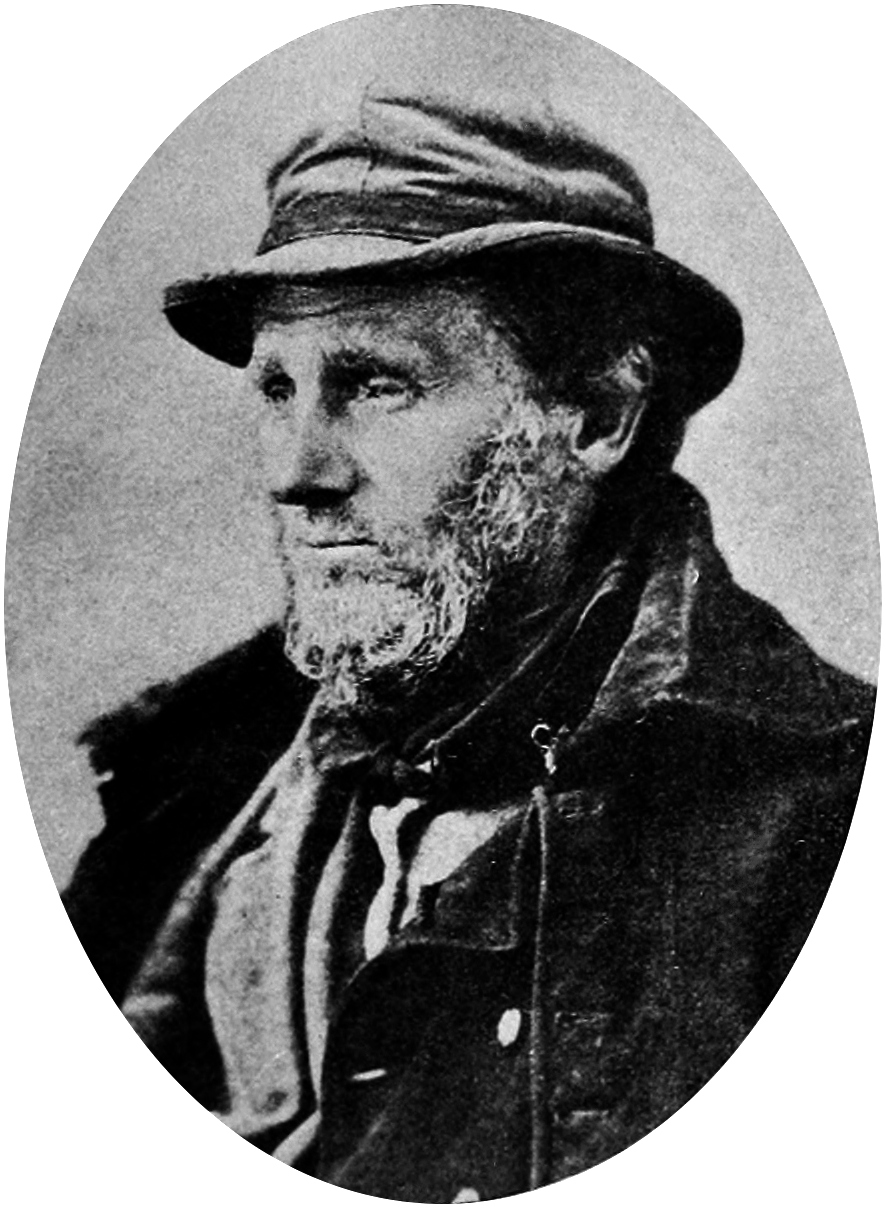
Portrait of David Foster, the founder of Kokomo, who is associated with many of the early stories of Kokomo

The city of Kokomo, Indiana is named after Kokomo, but it is unknown who actually proposed "Kokomo" as the name of the town or why. According to a popular legend, David Foster, the founder of the city of Kokomo, once stated, "It was the orneriest town on earth, so I named it after the orneriest Indian on earth—called it Kokomo." This legend is probably apocryphal. Traditionally, it has been said that Kokomo was a great Miami chieftain in north-central Indiana of enormous physical size, who was able to use his superior strength and cunning to secure the interests of his people and win them a vast hunting territory. This version of the story holds that Kokomo was "last of the fighting chiefs".

Another version of the story attested among the early settlers, however, maintains that Kokomo was not a chief at all, but rather a lazy, dishonest, wife-beating drunkard. According to this version of the story, Kokomo was so disreputable that the Miami refused to accept him as a member of their tribe. A story from the Peru Miami holds that Kokomo was once a member of their tribe, but that he was a disreputable rabble-rouser who was always causing trouble. This story holds that, finally, Kokomo gathered together a portion of the tribe, mostly women, and took them to the Wildcat Creek, where he founded his own village.

According to a legend recorded in an 1883 history of Howard and Tipton counties, Chief Ma-Ko-Ko-Mo had three brothers, who were also Miami chiefs: Shock-O-Mo (which means 'poplar tree'), Me-Shin-Go-Me-Sia (which means 'burr oak'), and Shap-Pan-Do-Si-A (which means 'sugar tree'). It is unknown what exact measure of authority each of the four brothers may have actually possessed. Chief Ma-Ko-Ko-Mo owned a log cabin in the Center Township of Howard County, which David Foster took possession of in the fall of 1842 and where he built a trading post. Foster subsequently had many dealings with the native peoples residing in the area.

=== Stewart interview ===
In the early 1920s, a Kokomo resident named Harrison Stewart, who had come to Kokomo at the age of ten in 1846 and who had known David Foster while he was alive, gave an interview for an article in a Kokomo newspaper in which he discussed Kokomo and David Foster. Stewart stated in the interview that Kokomo had been a Miami chieftain of enormous size and immense physical strength who had lived just west of Muncie and who had "brought riches and happiness to the Miami tribe by gaining great grounds on which they could hunt." According to Stewart in the interview, Foster had not actually known Kokomo personally, but had only heard about him in stories from the Miami who visited his trading post. According to Stewart, Foster himself had believed the name Kokomo to have meant "he-bear" in the Miami language. Stewart stated that, towards the end of his life, Kokomo had led hunting and fishing expeditions into the territory north of the Wildcat Creek, in the same area where the city of Kokomo was eventually established, and that he eventually died on one of these expeditions.

Stewart also stated that David Foster had told him in a conversation shortly before Foster's death in 1877 that a Native American burial, including a set of bones and collection of grave goods, had been uncovered at one point during the construction of a sawmill. The physician who examined the bones was Kokomo's first doctor, Corydon Richmond. Richmond concluded that they had belonged to a "giant more than seven feet tall and of great power," and the grave had contained brass kettles and stone tools, which Foster interpreted as evidence that the burial was ancient. According to Stewart, David Foster, after arriving on the scene and hearing this news, immediately began shouting, "Chief Kokomo! Chief Kokomo!" The remains that had been identified as those of Kokomo were eventually transferred to Kokomo's Pioneer Cemetery, located on Purdum Street just south of Superior Street, where a monument marks the alleged site of his remains.

== Historical reenactment ==
Each year in mid-September, the Koh-Koh-Mah & Foster Living History Encampment, located ten miles west of Kokomo, holds a reenactment of the era of Chief Ma-Ko-Ko-Mo.
