= Fair Lawn =

Fair Lawn is the name of several places in the United States of America:

- Fair Lawn, New Jersey
  - Radburn-Fair Lawn Station, Fair Lawn, New Jersey
  - Broadway-Fair Lawn Station, Fair Lawn, New Jersey
- Fair Lawn (Cold Spring, New York)

== See also ==
- Fairlawn (disambiguation)
