= Nellie Keeler =

American circus performer

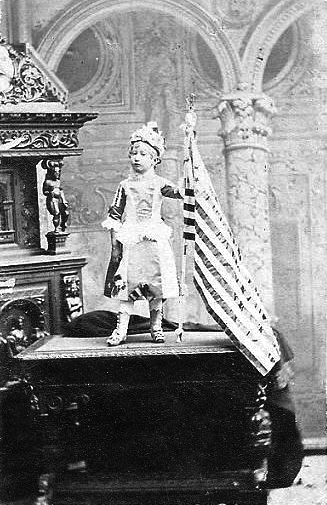
Nellie Keeler as Little Queen Mab (c. 1880s) Photograph compliments of Kathy Haley

Nellie Keeler (April 6, 1875 – 1903) was an American child circus performer known as Little Queen Mab.

== Life ==
Nellie Keeler was born with dwarfism on April 6, 1875, in Kokomo, Indiana. She was the youngest of three daughters and a son raised by Ezra and Maria Keeler. Her father was a farmer and a Civil War veteran, having served with the 4th Indiana Cavalry. Ezra Keeler died in 1917 while in his seventies at a home for disabled war veterans in Marion, Indiana. Maria Keeler lived to be in her late eighties, and died in 1937 in Kokomo.

== Career ==
By the age of three, Keeler had attracted the attention of showman P. T. Barnum through newspaper reports about her unusually small stature. At the time she reportedly weighed only 11 pounds (5.0 kg) and stood only a few inches taller than 2 feet (61 cm). After a successful four-week trial engagement in 1878, she joined Barnum's circus, touring with her father, Ezra Keeler, who accompanied her while she performed.

During her first season with the circus, Keeler performed under the stage name Little Queen Mab. She appeared on a platform about 3 feet (0.9 m) above the floor so audiences could better appreciate her size. She wore a fashionable blue cashmere costume with a short skirt and was exhibited beside Arthur James Caley Goshen, known professionally as Colonel Routh Goshen and billed as the Middlebush Giant, whom Barnum advertised as standing nearly 8 feet (2.4 m) tall and weighing more than 600 pounds (272 kg). Keeler's contract stipulated that repeated misbehaviour could void her engagement and deprive her family of an income of $100 a month.

Advertisements described Keeler as "the sweet girl with radiant golden hair", "a microscopic bud of humanity", "a little elf", "a fairy beauty", "a pocket volume of humanity", and "the Indiana Midget". One advertisement joked that "should our little elf ever enter the state of matrimony, she will not prove an expensive wife to dress, for it requires only 1.75 yards (1.6 m) of cloth to make her a dress after the most fashionable style."

In 1879, publicity for Keeler reported that although she was a year older, she had lost more than three pounds. During her years with the circus, she also appeared in commercially produced cartes de visite, including portraits by New York photographer Abraham Bogardus, which were sold as souvenirs.

Keeler remained with Barnum's circus for about six years. By the age of twelve she had outgrown the role of a tiny child performer, bringing her circus career to an end. Her earnings reportedly enabled her father to pay off the family's mortgage and become an independent farmer.

== Death ==
Her obituary, which appeared in the June 18, 1903, issue of the New York Times, stated she died at age twenty-eight from tuberculosis at her residence near Versailles, Indiana, and that she had been in declining health since her teens.
