= Fairlawn (Kokomo, Indiana) =

Fairlawn, Kokomo, Indiana
- Interactive map of Fairlawn, Kokomo, Indiana
- Coordinates: 40.47364°N 86.12154°W
- Country: United States
- State: Indiana
- City: Kokomo
- County: Howard
- Township: Center
- Elevation: 835 ft (255 m)
- Time zone: UTC-5 (EST)
- ZIP code: 46902
- Area code: 765

Fairlawn is a neighborhood in Kokomo, Indiana. The neighborhood is located south of downtown, and is almost entirely residential in character.

== History ==
Little is known about the start of Fairlawn, however it can be seen on city maps as far back as the early 1900s. It is now recognized as an official neighborhood according to the city and their Kokomo City-Line Trolley transportation maps.

== Geography ==
The neighborhood is bounded by Ohio to the east, Home Avenue / Apperson Way to the west, east Defenbaugh Street to the south and Markland Avenue to the North. Major roadways traversing through Fairlawn include Markland Avenue (Indiana State Road 22) running east and west and Home Avenue and Apperson Way traveling north and south.

== Transportation ==
=== Highways ===
- IN-22 to Burlington (West) and Hartford City (East)

=== Railroads ===
- Norfolk Southern Railway

=== Bus service ===
- Kokomo City-Line Trolley

=== Trails and paths ===
- Industrial Heritage Trail - Construction beginning in 2011, the Industrial Heritage Trail is currently 5.1 miles (8.2 km) in length and follows the right-of-way of a railroad corridor. The northern terminus is near the intersection of Apperson Way and Washington Street. The southern terminus is just south of the intersection of Lincoln Road and Home Avenue.
