= Purdue Polytechnic Institute Kokomo =

Satellite campus of Purdue Polytechnic

The Purdue Polytechnic Institute Kokomo is a satellite campus of the Purdue Polytechnic Institute. Before moving to its current location in the Inventrek building on Firmin Street, Kokomo, it was co-located on the Indiana University Kokomo campus.

Purdue Polytechnic Kokomo is part of the Purdue Polytechnic statewide system. The curriculum for the technology programs at Kokomo is identical to the curriculum on the West Lafayette campus.

== Academics ==
As of 2010, there were approximately 200 undergraduate students at Purdue Kokomo and 14 full-time faculty. Degrees are awarded by Purdue University. Associate degree programs that do not have corresponding bachelor's degrees can be completed at any other Purdue University campus.

College of Technology at Kokomo offers the following programs:

- Computer and Information Technology
- Computer Engineering Technology
- Electrical Engineering Technology
- Engineering Technology
- Mechanical Engineering Technology
- Organizational Leadership
- Certificate Programs
