= Fairlawn, Nevada =

Ghost town in Elko County, NV, US

Coordinates: 41°42′16″N 116°10′08″W

Fairlawn is a ghost town in Elko County, in the U.S. state of Nevada.

== History ==
A post office was established at Fairlawn in 1888, and remained in operation until it was discontinued in 1904. The company town was located on the property of Nevada Land and Cattle Company.
