= List of museums in Indiana =

This list of museums in Indiana is a list of museums, defined for this context as institutions (including nonprofit organizations, government entities, and private businesses) that collect and care for objects of cultural, artistic, scientific, or historical interest and make their collections or related exhibits available for public viewing. Museums that exist only in cyberspace (i.e., virtual museums) are not included. Also included are non-profit and university art galleries.

== Active museums ==
Name	Location	County	Region	Type	Summary
Academy of Hoosier Heritage Museum	Mooresville	Morgan	Central	Local	website
Adams County Historical Society Museum	Decatur	Adams	North	Local	website, operated by the Adams County Historical Society. The museum is located in the Charles Dugan House, listed on the National Register.
Adams Mill	Cutler	Carroll	North	Mill	1845 grist mill, displays of agriculture and household tools and equipment, historic 1860s Masonic lodge room
African/African-American Historical Society Museum	Fort Wayne	Allen	North	African American	Open by appointment
Alexandria Monroe Township Historical Society Museum	Alexandria	Madison	Central	Local	website
Amish Acres	Nappanee	Elkhart	North	Open-air	website
Anderson Museum of Art	Anderson	Madison	Central	Art	website, Indiana and contemporary art
Angel Mounds State Historic Site	Evansville	Vanderburgh	South	Archaeology	website, an archaeological site and interpretive center managed by the Indiana State Museum & Historic Sites. An expression of the Mississippian culture, the 600-acre (240-hectare) site is a National Historic Landmark.
Antique Fan Museum	Zionsville	Boone	Central	Commodity	website, operated by the Antique Fan Collectors Association
Art Museum of Greater Lafayette	Lafayette	Tippecanoe	North	Art	website, collection includes 19th- and 20th-century American art with a special focus on art of Indiana
Arts Council of Southwestern Indiana	Evansville	Vanderburgh	South	Art	website
Atterbury-Bakalar Air Museum	Columbus	Bartholomew	South	Aviation	website, military aviation history
Auburn Cord Duesenberg Automobile Museum	Auburn	DeKalb	North	Automotive	Dedicated to preserving cars built by the Auburn Automobile, Cord Automobile, and Duesenberg companies
Baer Field Heritage Air Park	Fort Wayne	Allen	North	Aviation	website
Barker Mansion	Michigan City	LaPorte	North	Historic house	website
Bartholomew County Historical Society Museum	Columbus	Bartholomew	South	Local	website, located in the McEwen-Samuels-Marr House
Batesville Historical Center	Batesville	Ripley	South	Local	website, operated by the Batesville Area Historical Society
Beck's Mill	Salem	Washington	South	Mill	Restored 19th-century grist mill
Bell Aircraft Museum	Mentone	Kosciusko	North	Aviation	website, life of aviation industrialist Lawrence Dale Bell, historic Bell Aircraft vehicles, history of aviation
Benjamin Harrison Presidential Site	Indianapolis	Marion	Central	Historic house	website, Victorian home of President Benjamin Harrison and National Historic Landmark.
Benton House	Indianapolis	Marion	Central	Historic house	Victorian home of Allen R. Benton, operated by the Irvington Historic Landmarks Foundation
Billie Creek Village	Rockville	Parke	Central	Open-air	Features 38 historical buildings and structures and hundred of antiques and artifacts
Billy Sunday Home Museum	Winona Lake	Kosciusko	North	Historic house	1911 Arts & Crafts bungalow, visitor center exhibits about preacher Billy Sunday
Blackford County History Center	Hartford City	Blackford	Central	Local	website
Body Reflections Hair Museum	French Lick	Orange	South	Hair	website, vintage razors, shears, combs, hairbrushes, hair tonics, permanent-wave machines and hair, part of Tony Kendall's salon, Body Reflections
Brown County Art Gallery	Nashville	Brown	South	Art	website, exhibits of local art
Brown County Pioneer Village	Nashville	Brown	South	Open-air	website, operated by the Brown County Historical Society, includes log jail, dog-trot building, doctor's office, log cabin and blacksmith shop
Buckley Homestead	Lowell	Lake	North	Living history	Includes agriculture museum, pioneer farm, historic farm house, school
Camp Atterbury Museum	Edinburgh	Johnson	Central	Military	website, history of Camp Atterbury
Canal House	Connersville	Fayette	Central	Local	website, owned and maintained by Historic Connersville, Inc.
CANDLES Holocaust Museum and Education Center	Terre Haute	Vigo	Central	Memorial	website, founded by Eva Mozes Kor in 1995
Carmel Clay History Museum	Carmel	Hamilton	Central	Local	website, operated by the Carmel Clay Historical Society, including 1883 Monon Depot
Carnegie Center for Art & History	New Albany	Floyd	South	Multiple	Art, local history
Carnegie Museum of Montgomery County	Crawfordsville	Montgomery	Central	Local	Themes include history, art, science and culture of Montgomery County
Carroll County Historical Museum	Delphi	Carroll	North	Local	website, operated by the Carroll County Historical Society in the Carroll County Courthouse
Cass County Museum	Logansport	Cass	North	Local	website, housed at the Castaldi Family History Center, operated by the Cass County Historical Society
Chellberg Farmhouse	Chesterton	Porter	North	Historic house	Located in Indiana Dunes National Park, turn-of-the-20th-century Swedish farmhouse, open to the public during festivals, demonstrations and ranger-guided tours
Chief Richardville House	Fort Wayne	Allen	North	Historic house	Restored 1827 home of Jean Baptiste de Richardville, the last tribal chief of the Miami people. The National Historic Landmark is managed by the Allen County-Fort Wayne Historical Society.
Children's Museum of Indianapolis	Indianapolis	Marion	Central	Children's	website, features interactive exhibits on art, world cultures, history, dinosaurs, science, and sports. It is the world's largest children's museum.
Circus City Museum	Peru	Miami	North	Local	website
Clark County Museum	Jeffersonville	Clark	South	Local	website
Clay County Historical Society Museum	Brazil	Clay	Central	Local	
Clay Township Military Library and Museum	Carmel	Hamilton	Central	Military	website
Cline Memorial House Museum	Angola	Steuben	North	Historic house	information, operated by the Steuben County Historical Society, late Victorian Queen Anne house
Clinton County Historical Museum	Frankfort	Clinton	North	Local	Operated by the Clinton County Historical Society
Coal Town and Railroad Museum	Clinton	Vermillion	Central	Local	website, open daily only during the Labor Day weekend during the Little Italy Festival
Colonel William Jones State Historic Site	Gentryville	Spencer	South	Historic house	Part of Lincoln State Park, early 19th-century house
Columbus Museum of Art & Design	Columbus	Bartholomew	South	Art	website, exhibits of art, design and performing art
Conner Prairie	Fishers	Hamilton	Central	Living history	website, 19th-century Indiana homestead
Corydon Capitol State Historic Site	Corydon	Harrison	South	Historic site	Indiana's first state capitol
Costigan House	Madison	Jefferson	South	Historic house	Operated by Historic Madison, Inc, mid-19th-century home of architect Francis Costigan. Tour information is available on the HMI website.
Cragun House	Lebanon	Boone	Central	Historic house	Victorian home operated by the Boone County Historical Society
Crispus Attucks Museum	Indianapolis	Marion	Central	African American	Operated by the Indianapolis Public Schools, school and local African American history
Culbertson Mansion State Historic Site	New Albany	Floyd	South	Historic house	1869 Victorian mansion
David Owsley Museum of Art	Muncie	Delaware	Central	Art	Part of Ball State University, houses some 11,000 works of art, 2,000+ of which are on display
Daviess County Historical Society Museum	Washington	Daviess	South	Local	website
Decatur County Museum	Greensburg	Decatur	South	Historic house	website, operated by the Decatur County Historical Society, Victorian-period Lathrop/Shannon House
DeKalb County History Museum	Butler	DeKalb	North	Local	Located in a former Carnegie library
The Depot History Museum & Art Gallery	Beverly Shores	Porter	North	Local	Located in a historic depot
Diocesan Museum	Fort Wayne	Allen	North	Religious	website, operated by the Roman Catholic Diocese of Fort Wayne-South Bend
Dr. Hutchings Office & Hospital	Madison	Jefferson	South	Historic house	Operated by Historic Madison, original late 19th-century equipment and furnishings. Tour information is available on the HMI website.
Dr. James Ford Historic Home	Wabash	Wabash	North	Historic house	website, restored 19th-century physician's home and surgery
Dr. Ted's Musical Marvels	Dale	Dubois	South	Music	website, restored mechanical musical instruments from around the world
Draft Animal Museum	Auburn	DeKalb	North	Agriculture	website, operated by the DeKalb County Horsemen's Association, horse-drawn agriculture equipment and vehicles
Dubois County Museum	Jasper	Dubois	South	Local	website, county history, agriculture, military, manufacturing, German heritage, sports
Dugger Coal Museum	Dugger	Sullivan	Central	Local	
Dunkirk City Public Library and Glass Museum	Dunkirk	Jay	Central	Glass	website, more than 6,000 pieces from 115 factories from around the world
Earlham College Art Collection	Richmond	Wayne	Central	Art	website, includes Ronald Gallery, Thorp Collection of Chinese Art in the Lilly Library, themed displays in the Landrum Bolling Center
Early Ford V-8 Foundation Museum	Butler	DeKalb	North	Automotive	website, operated by the Early Ford V-8 Foundation, features Flathead V-8 engines, transmissions, rear axles, Ford memorabilia, service items, carburetors, tires & rims, clocks
Edith Barrett Memorial Pike County History Center	Petersburg	Pike	South	Local	
Eleutherian College	Lancaster	Jefferson	South	Historic site	First college in Indiana to admit students without regard to race or sex
Elkhart County Historical Museum	Bristol	Elkhart	North	Local	Period and local history exhibits, located in a former school building
Elwood Haynes Museum	Kokomo	Howard	Central	Biographical	Life of inventor Elwood Haynes
Emil A. Blackmore Museum	Indianapolis	Marion	Central	Military	website, located on the fourth floor of the American Legion national headquarters
Emanuel Hatfield Museum	Owensburg	Greene	South	Local	History of the Hatfield family and hunter Emmanuel Hatfield
Ernie Pyle World War II Museum	Dana	Vermillion	Central	Biographical	website, home of reporter Ernie Pyle, formerly the Ernie Pyle State Historic Site
Eskenazi Museum of Art	Bloomington	Monroe	South	Art	website, located on the IU Bloomington campus, features collection of ancient jewelry and paintings by Pablo Picasso and Jackson Pollock
Eugene V. Debs Museum	Terre Haute	Vigo	Central	Biographical	website, operated by the Eugene V. Debs Foundation, the museum is located in the former home of union leader Eugene V. Debs
Eugene and Marilyn Glick Indiana History Center	Indianapolis	Marion	Central	History	website, operated by the Indiana Historical Society
Evansville African American Museum	Evansville	Vanderburgh	South	African American	website
Evansville Museum of Arts, History and Science	Evansville	Vanderburgh	South	Multiple	website
Evansville Wartime Museum	Evansville	Vanderburgh	South	Military	website
Eiteljorg Museum of American Indians and Western Art	Indianapolis	Marion	Central	Art	website, Native American art, Western American paintings and sculpture
Falls of the Ohio Interpretive Center	Clarksville	Clark	South	Natural history	website, operated by the Falls of the Ohio Foundation and located at Falls of the Ohio State Park.
Farmer House Museum	Bloomington	Monroe	South	Historic house	website, early to mid-20th-century house
Fayette County Historical Museum	Connersville	Fayette	Central	Local	website, operated by Historic Connersville, Inc.
Five Points Fire Museum	Lafayette	Tippecanoe	North	Fire	
Forks of the Wabash	Huntington	Huntington	North	Open-air	1840s Native American, pioneer and settler life
Fort Ouiatenon	West Lafayette	Tippecanoe	North	Living history	Replica 18th-century early French trading post blockhouse, open on weekends in summer for living history demonstrations
Fort Vallonia Museum	Vallonia	Jackson	South	Local	website
Fort Wayne Firefighters Museum	Fort Wayne	Allen	North	Fire	website
Fort Wayne Museum of Art	Fort Wayne	Allen	North	Art	website
Fort Wayne Railroad Historical Society	New Haven	Allen	North	Railroad	website
Fountain County War Museum	Veedersburg	Fountain	Central	Military	Located in a former depot
Freeman Field Army Airfield Museum	Seymour	Jackson	South	Military	website, history of Freeman Army Airfield in World War II
Freetown Village	Indianapolis	Marion	Central	Living history	website, highlights the history of African-American settlements in Indianapolis post-Civil War (1870s)
French Lick West Baden Museum	French Lick	Orange	South	Local	website
Fulton County Museum	Rochester	Fulton	North	Multiple	website, operated by the Fulton County Historical Society, includes local history museum, the Round Barn Museum with agriculture tools, equipment and machinery, 1900–1925 period village
Gaar Mansion	Richmond	Wayne	Central	Historic house	Late 19th-century Second Empire mansion
Gallery 924	Indianapolis	Marion	Central	Art	website, operated by the Indy Arts Council
Galleries at Peeler	Greencastle	Putnam	Central	Art	website, part of the Richard E. Peeler Art Center at DePauw University
Garfield Park Arts Center	Indianapolis	Marion	Central	Art	Includes exhibitions of local and regional art
Garrett Museum of Art	Garrett	DeKalb	North	Art	website, local art
Garrett Historical Railroad Museum	Garrett	DeKalb	North	Railroad	Located in a historic depot, includes a mail and baggage car, watchman's shanty and a C&O caboose
Gary Chanute Aquatorium	Gary	Lake	North	Aviation	Restored 1921 bathhouse with exhibits honoring Octave Chanute and the Tuskegee Airmen. It is listed on the National Register and managed by the Chanute Aquatorium Society.
Gary Historical & Cultural Society	Gary	Lake	North	Local	Programs and exhibits on the local history and culture of Gary. The society manages the Gary Land Company Building, home to its museum and listed on the National Register.
Gas City Museum	Gas City	Grant	Central	Local	website, operated by the Gas City Historical Society
General Lew Wallace Study and Museum	Crawfordsville	Montgomery	Central	Biographical	Home and study of Lew Wallace, author of Ben-Hur: A Tale of the Christ. The Lew Wallace Study Preservation Society manages the 1895 National Historic Landmark.
Gene Stratton-Porter State Historic Site	Rome City	Noble	North	Biographical	Home of author Gene Stratton-Porter
George Rogers Clark National Historical Park	Vincennes	Knox	South	Historic site	Site of important campaign during the American Revolution
Goshen Historical Museum	Goshen	Elkhart	North	Local	website, operated by the Goshen Historical Society
Great American Songbook Foundation	Carmel	Hamilton	Central	Music	website
Great Lakes Museum of Military History	Michigan City	LaPorte	North	Military	website
Greentown Glass Museum	Greentown	Howard	Central	Glass	website, glass items produced by the Indiana Tumbler and Goblet Company
Greentown History Center	Greentown	Howard	Central	Local	website, history and culture of eastern Howard County, operated by the Greentown Historical Society
Griffith Historical Park & Museum	Griffith	Lake	North	Railroad	website, operated by the Griffith Historical Society, depot museum, railroad cars, structures
Grissom Air Museum	Peru	Miami	North	Aviation	website
Grouseland	Vincennes	Knox	South	Historic house	Home of William Henry Harrison when he was governor of Indiana
Grover Museum	Shelbyville	Shelby	Central	Local	Operated by the Shelby County Historical Society, includes period shop and businesses displays, model train layout
Gruenewald House	Anderson	Madison	Central	Historic house	Turn-of-the-century Victorian home
Gus Grissom Boyhood Home	Mitchell	Lawrence	South	Biographical	website, boyhood home of astronaut Gus Grissom. Operated by the Virgil I. Grissom Memorial Inc., the home is open to tours on Saturdays from May through September.
Haan Mansion Museum of Indiana Art	Lafayette	Tippecanoe	North	Art	Indiana art, antique furniture and decorative items
Hagerstown Museum & Arts Place	Hagerstown	Wayne	Central	Local	website
Hall of Heroes Superhero Museum	Elkhart	Elkhart	North	Toy	website
Hallmark Ornament Museum	Warsaw	Kosciusko	North	Commodity	website, part of the Party Shop, complete collection of Hallmark Cards ornaments since 1973; also known as the Prudencio/Hamrick Hallmark Ornament Museum
Hamilton County Museum of History	Noblesville	Hamilton	Central	Local	website, Victorian-period former sheriff's residence and jail, operated by the Hamilton County Historical Society
Hancock County Historical Society	Greenfield	Hancock	Central	Local	website, operates the Chapel in the Park Museum and the Old Log Jail Museum
Harrison Center	Indianapolis	Marion	Central	Art	
Harrison County Discovery Center	Corydon	Harrison	South	Multiple	website
Hayden Historical Museum	Hayden	Jennings	South	Local	website
Hayes Arboretum	Richmond	Wayne	Central	Natural history	466 acres, includes nature center and museum with exhibits about founder Stanley Hayes and railroad track items produced by the Hayes Track Appliance Company
Healthworks Kids Museum	South Bend	St. Joseph	North	Children's	website, affiliated with the Memorial Hospital of South Bend
Henager Memories and Nostalgia Museum	Buckskin	Gibson	South	Commodity	website, American and pop culture nostalgia collectibles including Western movie stars, American music, Smokey Bear, automobiles, Hollywood, Abraham Lincoln, Santa Claus
Hendricks County Historical Museum	Danville	Hendricks	Central	Local	website
Heritage House Museum	Walkerton	St. Joseph	North	Local	website, operated by the Walkerton Area Historical Society
Henry County Historical Society Museum	New Castle	Henry	Central	Historic house	Victorian-period rooms in the Gen. William Grose House
Herron Galleries	Indianapolis	Marion	Central	Art	website, part of Herron School of Art and Design, includes Eleanor Prest Reese, Robert B. Berkshire and Dorit & Gerald Paul Galleries, Basile Gallery, and Marsh Gallery in Sidney and Lois Eskenazi Hall, Eskenazi Fine Arts Center gallery
Hesston Steam Museum	La Porte	LaPorte	North	Railroad	Collections of railroad and steam equipment
Hillforest	Aurora	Dearborn	South	Historic house	Victorian mansion
Hinkle–Garton Farmstead	Bloomington	Monroe	South	Historic house	website
The History Center	Fort Wayne	Allen	North	Local	website, operated by the Allen County-Fort Wayne Historical Society
The History Center	Lafayette	Tippecanoe	North	Local	website, operated by the Tippecanoe County Historical Association
The History Museum	South Bend	St. Joseph	North	Local	website, heritage of the St. Joseph River Valley region, includes exhibits of local history, history of the University of Notre Dame, the Copshaholm mansion, a 1930s-period Polish immigrant family worker's home, and the Kidsfirst Children's Museum
Hoosier Art Salon New Harmony Gallery	New Harmony	Posey	South	Art	Art gallery of Indiana artists
Hoosier Cabinet Museum	Nappanee	Elkhart	North	Design	website, craftsmanship of the Hoosier cabinet
Hoosier Gym	Knightstown	Henry	Central	Sports	Famous for being the central location for the 1986 basketball movie Hoosiers
Hoosier Valley Railroad Museum	North Judson	Starke	North	Railroad	
Howard County Historical Society Museum	Kokomo	Howard	Central	Local	Located in the Seiberling Mansion in the Old Silk Stocking Neighborhood
Howard L. Schrott Center for the Arts	Indianapolis	Marion	Central	Art	website, part of Butler University, performing arts center with an art gallery
Howard Steamboat Museum	Jeffersonville	Clark	South	Maritime	Steamboat and local history
Huddleston Farmhouse	Mount Auburn	Wayne	Central	Historic house	1841 inn and farmhouse
Huntingburg Museum	Huntingburg	Dubois	South	Local	website
Imagination Station	Lafayette	Tippecanoe	North	Science	website
Indiana Baseball Hall of Fame	Jasper	Dubois	South	Sports	website, located on the campus of Vincennes University
Indiana Basketball Hall of Fame	New Castle	Henry	Central	Sports	website
Indiana Dinosaur Museum	South Bend	St. Joseph	North	Archaeology	website
Indiana Football Hall of Fame	Richmond	Wayne	Central	Sports	website
Indiana Geological and Water Survey	Bloomington	Monroe	South	Natural history	Rocks, minerals, and fossils from Indiana and beyond
Indiana Medical History Museum	Indianapolis	Marion	Central	Medical	Focus is beginning of scientific psychiatry and modern medicine
Indiana Military Museum	Vincennes	Knox	South	Military	website, America's military history from the American Revolution to the present day
Indiana Railway Museum	French Lick	Orange	South	Railroad	Heritage railroad and museum
Indiana State Museum	Indianapolis	Marion	Central	Multiple	Exhibits on the science, art, culture, and history of Indiana from prehistoric times up to the present day.
Indiana State Police Museum	Indianapolis	Marion	Central	Police	website, museum dedicated to the Indiana State Police
Indiana Track & Field and Cross Country Hall of Fame Museum	Terre Haute	Vigo	Central	Sports	website
Indiana University East Art Gallery	Richmond	Wayne	Central	Art	website, located in Whitewater Hall
Indiana University Kokomo Art Gallery	Kokomo	Howard	Central	Art	website
Indiana University Kokomo Downtown Art Gallery	Kokomo	Howard	Central	Art	website
Indiana University Museum of Archaeology and Anthropology	Bloomington	Monroe	South	Archaeology	website, formed through the merging of the Glenn A. Black Laboratory of Archaeology and the Mathers Museum of World Cultures on the Indiana University Bloomington campus
Indiana War Memorial Museum	Indianapolis	Marion	Central	Military	website
Indianapolis Artsgarden	Indianapolis	Marion	Central	Art	website, public art and performance venue, operated by the Indy Arts Council
Indianapolis Firefighters Museum	Indianapolis	Marion	Central	Fire	website, antique fire wagons
Indianapolis Motor Speedway Museum	Speedway	Marion	Central	Automotive	website
Indianapolis Museum of Art at Newfields	Indianapolis	Marion	Central	Art	website, collections include Neo-Impressionist paintings; Japanese paintings of the Edo period; Chinese ceramics and bronzes; paintings, sculptures, and prints by Paul Gauguin and the Pont-Aven School; a large number of works by J. M. W. Turner; contemporary art; textiles and fashion arts; modern design
Indy Art Center	Indianapolis	Marion	Central	Art	website, nonprofit community art center featuring public gallery exhibitions, programs, and classes
International Circus Hall of Fame	Peru	Miami	North	Hall of fame	Hall of fame and museum about circuses and important circus figures
Jackson County History Center	Brownstown	Jackson	South	Local	
Jackson County Visitor Center Exhibit	Freetown	Jackson	South	Local	Located in the Southern Indiana Railroad Freighthouse
James Dean Gallery	Fairmount	Grant	Central	Biographical	website
James Dean Museum	Fairmount	Grant	Central	Local	website
James Whitcomb Riley Boyhood Home and Museum	Greenfield	Hancock	Central	Historic house	Mid-19th-century birthplace home of poet James Whitcomb Riley
James Whitcomb Riley Museum Home	Indianapolis	Marion	Central	Historic house	Home of poet James Whitcomb Riley
Jasonville History Museum	Jasonville	Greene	South	Local	
Jasper Arts Center	Jasper	Dubois	South	Art	website, Krempp Gallery features changing exhibits of regional artists and groups
Jasper County Historical Society & Museum	Rensselaer	Jasper	North	Local	website
Jeeninga Museum of Bible & Near Eastern Studies	Anderson	Madison	Central	Archaeology	website, part of Anderson University, context and history of the Ancient Near East as it relates to the Bible
Jefferson County Heritage Center	Madison	Jefferson	South	Local	website, operated by the Jefferson County Historical Society, includes exhibits on pioneers, transportation, Victorian life, Civil War
John Hay Center	Salem	Washington	South	Multiple	Includes Stevens Memorial Museum of local history, Depot Railroad Museum, birthplace of John Milton Hay, and a pioneer village
Jennings County Historical Society Museum	Vernon	Jennings	South	Local	website
Johnson County Museum of History	Franklin	Johnson	Central	Local	Operated by the Johnson County Historical Society, former Masonic Temple containing local history displays and a genealogy library
Jonesboro Historical Museum	Jonesboro	Grant	Central	Local	
Joseph Moore Museum	Richmond	Wayne	Central	Natural history	website, part of Earlham College, natural and cultural history of Richmond, Indiana, and the world including birds, mammals, rocks, insects, fossils, live reptiles, and an Egyptian mummy named Ta'an
Kidscommons	Columbus	Bartholomew	South	Children's	website
Knightstown Historic Museum	Knightstown	Henry	Central	Local	website
Kokomo Automotive Museum	Kokomo	Howard	Central	Automotive	website, cars, gas station, diner, automotive history, located at the Ivy Tech Community College Kokomo Event & Conference Center
Kosciusko County Jail Museum	Warsaw	Kosciusko	North	Local	Operated by the Kosciusko County Historical Society, former prison and sheriff's house, local history displays
Kruse Automotive & Carriage Museum	Auburn	DeKalb	North	Automotive	website, includes classic, racing and Carl Casper custom cars, carriages including several British Royal carriages, International Monster Truck Museum & Hall of Fame Exhibit, the Northeastern Racing Gallery and more
Kurt Vonnegut Museum and Library	Indianapolis	Marion	Central	Biographical	
Lake County Historical Museum	Crown Point	Lake	North	Local	website, operated by the Lake County Historical Society
Lake of the Red Cedars Museum	Cedar Lake	Lake	North	Local	website, operated by the Cedar Lake Historical Association
Lane Place	Crawfordsville	Montgomery	Central	Historic house	Operated by the Montgomery County Historical Society
Lanier Mansion State Historic Site	Madison	Jefferson	South	Historic house	1840s mansion
LaPorte County Historical Society Museum	La Porte	LaPorte	North	Local	website, includes pioneer items, period display rooms
Larry Bird Museum	Terre Haute	Vigo	Central	Biographical	website
Lawrence County Museum of History	Bedford	Lawrence	South	Local	website
Levi & Catharine Coffin State Historic Site	Fountain City	Wayne	Central	Historic house	Station on the Underground Railroad
Lieber Log Cabin	Marshall	Parke	Central	Historic house	Located in Turkey Run State Park, commemorates Richard Lieber, first director of the Indiana State Parks system
Life on the Ohio River History Museum	Vevay	Switzerland	South	Maritime	website, operated by the Switzerland County Historical Society, transportation on the Ohio River including flatboats, steamboats, showboats, keelboats
Ligonier Historical Museum	Ligonier	Noble	North	Local	
Louis J. Koch Family Children's Museum of Evansville	Evansville	Vanderburgh	South	Children's	website
Limberlost State Historic Site	Geneva	Adams	North	Historic house	1895 log home of author Gene Stratton Porter
Lincoln Boyhood National Memorial	Lincoln City	Spencer	South	Multiple	Includes visitor center with museum about Lincoln and the Lincoln Living Historical Farm, an 1820 pioneer homestead
Lincoln Pioneer Village	Rockport	Spencer	South	Open-air	Features log cabins, public buildings, schools, and churches as they stood in Lincoln's days in Spencer County
Linden Depot Museum	Linden	Montgomery	Central	Railroad	Operated by the Linden-Madison Township Historical Society
Lindley House	Paoli	Orange	South	Historic house	1850–1869 period house, operated by the Orange County Historical Society
Long Home Museum	Logansport	Cass	North	Historic house	website, operated by the Cass County Historical Society; listed on the National Register
Lubeznik Center for the Arts	Michigan City	LaPorte	North	Art	website
Luckey Hospital Museum	Wolf Lake	Noble	North	Medical	website, rural hospital displays from the 1930s to 1950s
Lusk Home and Mill Site	Marshall	Parke	Central	Historic house	Located in Turkey Run State Park, early pioneer home and grist mill
Lyles Station Museum	Princeton	Gibson	South	African American	website, operated by the Lyles Station Historic Preservation Corporation
Madison Railroad Station Museum	Madison	Jefferson	South	Railroad	website, operated by the Jefferson County Historical Society
Mansfield Roller Mill	Mansfield	Parke	Central	Mill	Early 19th-century grist mill
Marion City Museum	Marion	Grant	Central	Local	website, part of the Marion Public Library
Marshall County Historical Museum	Plymouth	Marshall	North	Local	website, operated Marshall County Historical Society
Martin County Historical Museum	Shoals	Martin	South	Local	Operated by the Martin County Historical Society
Masonic Library and Museum of Indiana	Indianapolis	Marion	Central	Local	website, operated by the Grand Lodge of Indiana, cultural history of Indiana's Freemasons
McCutchan Art Center/Pace Galleries	Evansville	Vanderburgh	South	Art	website, part of University of Southern Indiana
Menno-Hof	Shipshewana	LaGrange	North	Religious	website, faith and life of Amish and Mennonites
Merrillville History Museum	Merrillville	Lake	North	Local	website, operated by the Merrillville-Ross Township Historical Society
Miami County Museum	Peru	Miami	North	Local	website, operated by the Miami County Historical Society, includes Cole Porter exhibit
Mid-America Windmill Museum	Kendallville	Noble	North	Open-air	website, story of wind power from its origination through the American windmill to the present day
Middlebury Community Museum	Middlebury	Elkhart	North	Local	website
Middletown Historical Society Museum	Middletown	Henry	Central	Local	
Midtown Museum of Native Cultures	Waynetown	Montgomery	Central	Private	Private collection of Native American artifacts
Midwest Museum of American Art	Elkhart	Elkhart	North	Art	Focuses on 19th- and 20th-century American Art, with original paintings by Grandma Moses and Norman Rockwell
Milan '54 Hoosiers Museum	Milan	Ripley	South	Sports	website, history of the 1954 Milan High School basketball team
Military Honor Park and Museum	South Bend	St. Joseph	North	Military	website
Miller House and Garden	Columbus	Bartholomew	South	Historic house	Mid-Century modern home designed by Eero Saarinen
Minnetrista	Muncie	Delaware	Central	Multiple	website, includes a museum with exhibits of nature, local history and art, a historic home, and many themed gardens and outdoor sculptures
Mishawaka Historical Museum	Mishawaka	St. Joseph	North	Local	website
Model T Museum	Centerville	Wayne	Central	Automotive	website, operated by the Model T Ford Club of America
Modelle Metcalf Visual Arts Center Gallery	Upland	Grant	Central	Art	website, part of Taylor University
Monon Connection Museum	Monon	White	North	Railroad	website
Monroe County History Center	Bloomington	Monroe	South	Local	website, operated by the Monroe County Historical Society
Moore-Youse Home Museum	Muncie	Delaware	Central	Historic house	Operated by the Delaware County Historical Society
Moreau Art Galleries	Notre Dame	St. Joseph	North	Art	website, part of the Moreau Center for the Arts at Saint Mary's College, up to nine exhibitions by professional, contemporary artists rotate in the three different exhibition spaces
Muncie Children's Museum	Muncie	Delaware	Central	Children's	website
Munster History Museum	Munster	Lake	North	Local	website, operated by the Munster Historical Society in the Kaske House
Murphy Art Center	Indianapolis	Marion	Central	Art	Includes five galleries
Musee de Venoge	Vevay	Switzerland	South	Historic house	website, early 19th-century French Colonial house
Museum of the Coal Industry	Lynnville	Warrick	South	Industry	website
Museum of Culver & Lake Maxinkuckee History	Culver	Marshall	North	Local	website operated by the Antiquarian and Historical Society of Culver
Museum of Madison County History	Anderson	Madison	Central	Local	website, operated by the Madison County Historical Society
Museum of Miniature Houses and Other Collections	Carmel	Hamilton	Central	Toy	website, dollhouses and miniatures
Museum of Overbeck Art Pottery	Cambridge City	Wayne	Central	Ceramics	website, pottery created by the Overbeck Sisters, located in the town library
Museum of 20th Century Warfare	Lawrence	Marion	Central	Military	Located at Fort Harrison State Park, exhibits about the fort and technology, artifacts, uniforms and soldiers of the 20th century
Museum of the Soldier	Portland	Jay	Central	Military	website
National Auto and Truck Museum	Auburn	DeKalb	North	Automotive	website, emphasis on post World War II cars and trucks
National Model Aviation Museum	Muncie	Delaware	Central	Aviation	website, model aircraft and aeromodelling, operated by the Academy of Model Aeronautics
National New York Central Railroad Museum	Elkhart	Elkhart	North	Railroad	History and equipment of the New York Central Railroad
NCAA Hall of Champions	Indianapolis	Marion	Central	Sports	website, operated by the National Collegiate Athletic Association (NCAA)
New Harmony State Historic Site	New Harmony	Posey	South	Historic site	Site of two utopian communities, includes several historic houses and museums, New Harmony Gallery of Contemporary Art
Newburgh Museum	Newburgh	Warrick	South	Local	website
Newton County Historical Society Museum and Resource Center	Kentland	Newton	North	Local	
NMLRA Museum	Friendship	Ripley	South	Sports	website, operated by the National Muzzle Loading Rifle Association (NMLRA)
Oak Grove Heritage House	Oxford	Benton	North	Local	Located in a former Presbyterian church
Ohio County Historical Museum	Rising Sun	Ohio	South	Local	website, housed in a 19th-century plow factory, focus is 19th and early 20th-century life and events, operated by the Ohio County Historical Society
Old Jail Museum	Albion	Noble	North	Local	Operated by the Noble County Historical Society in the former sheriff's house and county jail
Old Cathedral Library & Museum	Vincennes	Knox	South	Religious	Oldest library in the state of Indiana, display of historic and church artifacts
Old French House & Indian Museum	Vincennes	Knox	South	Historic house	1809 French Creole house
Old Hotel Museum & Railroad Learning Center	Union City	Randolph	Central	Local	Also area railroad artifacts
Old Lighthouse Museum	Michigan City	LaPorte	North	Lighthouse	Operated by the Michigan City Historical Society, only lighthouse in Indiana
Oldfields–Lilly House & Gardens	Indianapolis	Marion	Central	Historic house	1930s mansion, located on the grounds of the Indianapolis Museum of Art
Osgood Historical Museum	Osgood	Ripley	South	Local	
Orange County Museum	Paoli	Orange	South	Local	website, operated by the Orange County Historical Society
Owen County Heritage & Culture Center	Spencer	Owen	South	Local	website
Padgett Museum	New Albany	Floyd	South	Local	Operated by the Floyd County Historical Society
Paul Dresser Birthplace	Terre Haute	Vigo	Central	Biographical	Home of composer Paul Dresser, operated seasonally by the Vigo County Historical Society
Pendleton Historical Museum	Pendleton	Madison	Central	Local	Located in Falls Park
Pershing Township Museum	Freetown	Jackson	South	Local	
Perry County Museum	Cannelton	Perry	South	Local	website, located at the old Perry County Courthouse
Piper Flight Museum	Salem	Washington	South	Aviation	website, located at the Salem Municipal Airport, features three vintage Piper air craft, a flight simulator, exhibits on Piper Aircraft
PJ Gilsinger & Co. John Deere Museum	Winamac	Pulaski	North	Private	website
Porter County Museum	Valparaiso	Porter	North	Local	Formerly the Old Jail Museum
Pound Store Museum	Leesburg	Kosciusko	North	Local	Operated by the Kosciusko County Historical Society, historic general store and post office
Prill School Museum	Henry Township	Fulton	North	Local	Late 19th-century one-room schoolhouse
Prophetstown State Park	Battle Ground	Tippecanoe	North	Living history	1920s living farmstead and Native American village buildings
Pulaski County Historical Museum	Winamac	Pulaski	North	Local	website, operated by the Pulaski County Historical Society
Purdue University Galleries	West Lafayette	Tippecanoe	North	Art	website, includes Patti and Rusty Rueff Galleries in Yue-Kong Pao Hall, Robert L. Ringel Gallery in Stewart Center, Fountain Gallery in the Perrin building
Putnam County Museum	Greencastle	Putnam	Central	Local	website
Quayle Vice Presidential Learning Center	Huntington	Huntington	North	History	History of all the Vice Presidents
Quilters Hall of Fame	Marion	Grant	Central	Textile	Located in the Marie Webster House, exhibits of quilts
Raclin Murphy Museum of Art	Notre Dame	St. Joseph	North	Art	Part of University of Notre Dame, world cultures and periods with a focus on Western art history, known for its Italian Renaissance paintings and Mesoamerican galleries
Randolph County Historical Museum	Winchester	Randolph	Central	Local	website, operated by the Randolph County Historical Society
Ray Bradbury Center	Indianapolis	Marion	Central	Biographical	website, archive dedicated to scholarship on the work of American author and screenwriter Ray Bradbury, located in Robert E. Cavanaugh Hall on the campus of Indiana University Indianapolis
Reitz Home Museum	Evansville	Vanderburgh	South	Historic house	Victorian house museum
Red Skelton Museum of American Comedy	Vincennes	Knox	South	Biographical	website, life of comedian Red Skelton
Rhythm! Discovery Center	Indianapolis	Marion	Central	Music	website, drums and percussive instruments from around the world, operated by the Percussive Arts Society
Richmond Art Museum	Richmond	Wayne	Central	Art	Collections include American Impressionists, Taos School, the Hoosier Group, the Richmond School, and other regional artists and ceramics
Rickenbaugh House	St. Croix	Perry	South	Historic house	Located in Hoosier National Forest, mid-19th-century house
Ridgeville-Kitselman Museum	Ridgeville	Randolph	Central	Local	Located in the Ridgeville Library
Ripley County Museum	Versailles	Ripley	South	Local	website, operated by the Ripley County Historical Society
Rotary Jail Museum and Tannenbaum Cultural Center	Crawfordsville	Montgomery	Central	Local	website, rotary-design jail, also local history exhibits
Rush County Historical Society Museum	Rushville	Rush	Central	Local	website
Ruthmere	Elkhart	Elkhart	North	Art	Beaux Arts mansion with collection of fine and decorative arts, classic automobiles
RV/MH Hall of Fame	Elkhart	Elkhart	North	Automotive	History, technology and pioneers in the development of recreational vehicles and motor homes
Samara House	West Lafayette	Tippecanoe	North	Historic house	1950s house designed by Frank Lloyd Wright
Santa Claus Museum & Village	Santa Claus	Spencer	South	Local	website, town history, tourism, history of Santa Claus Land, letters to Santa, President Abraham Lincoln and his childhood in southern Indiana, antique toys and dolls, Coca-Cola memorabilia
Schimpff's Confectionery	Jeffersonville	Clark	South	Food	Historic candy store and museum
Schofield House	Madison	Jefferson	South	Historic house	1817 house where in 1818, the Grand Lodge of Indiana, the organization of Freemasons in Indiana, was founded
Schroeder Saddletree Factory Museum	Madison	Jefferson	South	Industry	Operated by Historic Madison, factory that made wooden frames for saddle makers. Tour information is available on the HMI website
Science Central	Fort Wayne	Allen	North	Science	website
Scott County Heritage Center and Museum	Scottsburg	Scott	South	Local	Victorian house museum
Scribner House	New Albany	Floyd	South	Historic house	Open twice a year
Sheridan Historical Society Museum	Sheridan	Hamilton	Central	Local	website
Shipshewana Area Historical Society Museum	Shipshewana	LaGrange	North	Local	
Shirley Historical Society Museum	Shirley	Henry	Central	Local	Located in the former depot
Shrewsbury-Windle House	Madison	Jefferson	South	Historic house	Meticulously restored 1840s house. Tour information is available on the HMI website.
Shrine of Saint Mother Théodore Guérin	Saint Mary-of-the-Woods	Vigo	Central	Religious	Exhibits about Saint Théodore Guérin and the ministries of the Sisters of Providence
Skinner Farm Village	Perrysville	Vermillion	Central	Open-air	website, log cabins, buildings, round barn and artifacts which represent over 150 years of local Indiana history
South Bend Museum of Art	South Bend	St. Joseph	North	Art	Collection includes historical Indiana artists and significant contemporary regional artists
Southern Indiana Center for the Arts	Seymour	Jackson	South	Art	website, includes art gallery exhibits and the Conner Museum of Antique Printing, which features a working print shop of period presses of the 1800s
Spring Mill State Park	Mitchell	Lawrence	South	Open-air	website, open daily from May thru mid-October, 9 a.m. to 5 p.m. The restored 1814 Pioneer Village contains 20 historic buildings including a gristmill built in 1817. Heritage interpreters portray the year 1863 and demonstrate period crafts. The park also features a small memorial museum to astronaut Gus Grissom.
Starke County History Center & Schricker House	Knox	Starke	North	Local/ Historic Home	website, The History Center houses local artifacts. The Schricker House, home of Indiana's only governor to serve two non-consecutive four-year terms, is furnished in original and period-correct items.
Stockdale Mill	Roann	Wabash	North	Mill	Water-powered flour mill and dam
Stone's Tavern	Sparta Township	Noble	North	Local	19th-century tavern, operated by the Stone's Trace Historical Society
Studebaker National Museum	South Bend	St. Joseph	North	Automotive	
Sullivan County History Museum	Sullivan	Sullivan	Central	Local	Operated by the Sullivan County Public Library
Sullivan House	Madison	Jefferson	South	Historic house	Operated by Historic Madison, 1818 home of Judge Jeremiah Sullivan. Tour information is available on the HMI website.
St. Michael the Archangel Church	Madison	Jefferson	South	Religious	Operated by Historic Madison, 1839 former Catholic Church. Tour information is available on the HMI website.
SullivanMunce Cultural Center	Zionsville	Boone	Central	Multiple	Contains the P.H. Sullivan Museum, Munce Art Center, a genealogy library, and welcome center. American Alliance of Museums member institution.
Sunman Historical Museum	Sunman	Ripley	South	Local	
The Stutz Car Museum	Indianapolis	Marion	Central	Automotive	website
Swiss Heritage Village & Museum	Berne	Adams	North	Open-air	website
Switzerland County Agriculture Museum Center	Vevay	Switzerland	South	Agriculture	website, operated by the Switzerland County Historical Society in the 19th-century Thiebaud Farmstead
Switzerland County History Museum	Vevay	Switzerland	South	Local	website, operated by the Switzerland County Historical Society
Swope Art Museum	Terre Haute	Vigo	Central	Art	Features American art with special emphasis on painting and sculpture of the twentieth century and on Wabash Valley artists
Syracuse-Wawasee Historical Museum	Syracuse	Kosciusko	North	Local	website
Task Force Tips Fire Museum	Valparaiso	Porter	North	Fire	Includes historic firefighting vehicles, equipment and uniforms
T. C. Steele State Historic Site	Nashville	Brown	South	Biographical	Home of artist T. C. Steele
Terre Haute Children's Museum	Terre Haute	Vigo	Central	Children's	website
Terre Haute Fire-Police Museum	Terre Haute	Vigo	Central	Fire	website, historic fire-fighting and police equipment, housed in a historic fire station
Thorntown Heritage Museum	Thorntown	Boone	Central	Local	website, operated by the Sugar Creek Historical Society and owned by the Thorntown Public Library
Time Was Museum	Elkhart	Elkhart	North	Local	Elkhart's community life, open by appointment
Tippecanoe Battlefield Museum	Battle Ground	Tippecanoe	North	Military	Operated by the Tippecanoe County Historical Association in the 16-acre Tippecanoe Battlefield Park, history and events of the Battle of Tippecanoe, a nature center and artifacts of European and Native American cultures
Tipton County Historical Society	Tipton	Tipton	Central	Local	website, operated by the Tipton County Historical Society
Union County Depot Museum	Liberty	Union	South	Local	
University Art Gallery	Terre Haute	Vigo	Central	Art	website, part of Indiana State University
University of Indianapolis Art Gallery	Indianapolis	Marion	Central	Art	website, located in the Christel DeHaan Fine Arts Center, hosts six to seven exhibitions annually
USS LST Ship Memorial	Evansville	Vanderburgh	South	Maritime	Museum ship
Vera's Little Red Dollhouse Museum	Middletown	Henry	Central	Toy	Open by appointment
Vigo County Historical Museum	Terre Haute	Vigo	Central	Local	website, period rooms, local history displays, Coca-Cola artifacts
Vincennes State Historic Sites	Vincennes	Knox	South	Historic site	website, includes the Indiana Territorial Capitol, Jefferson Academy, Elihu Stout Print Shop, Old State Bank
Vintage Fire Museum	Jeffersonville	Clark	South	Fire	website, restored fire engines (hand pumpers, chemical engines, horse-drawn steamers, early motorized engines) and other equipment dating back to 1756
W. Paul Wolf War History Museum	Fort Wayne	Allen	North	Military	website, perated by the Veterans National Memorial Shrine & Museum
Wabash County Museum	Wabash	Wabash	North	Local	website
Wabash Valley Railroad Museum	Terre Haute	Vigo	Central	Railroad	website, operated by the Haley Tower Historical & Technical Society
Wakarusa Historical Museum	Wakarusa	Elkhart	North	Open-air	website, local history displays in seven buildings, includes the Birds Eye View Museum of Miniatures
Warrick County Museum	Boonville	Warrick	South	Local	website
Wayne County Historical Museum	Richmond	Wayne	Central	Open-air	website, complex includes period clothing, furniture, portraits, dolls, two log cabins, a Conestoga wagon, blacksmith shop, print shop, bakery, loom house, automobiles, steam powered tractors, locally made artifacts, Native American and Civil War artifacts, and a mummy
Wells County Historical Society Museum	Bluffton	Wells	North	Local	website, operated by the Wells County Historical Society and located in the Stewart-Studebaker House, listed on the National Register.
Westchester Township History Museum	Chesterton	Porter	North	Local	Operated by the Westchester Historical Society, the museum is housed in the George Brown Mansion, listed on the National Register.
Westfield Washington Historical Museum	Westfield	Hamilton	Central	Local	website, operated by the Westfield Washington Historical Society
White County Museum	Monticello	White	North	Local	website, operated by the White County Historical Society, the museum is housed in the Monticello Carnegie Library, listed on the National Register.
Whitewater Canal State Historic Site	Metamora	Franklin	South	Historic site	website, preserved 14-mile section of the Whitewater Canal, features a horse-drawn canal boat and Metamora Grist Mill
Whitley County Agricultural Museum	Columbia City	Whitley	North	Agriculture	website
Whitley County Historical Museum	Columbia City	Whitley	North	Local	website, operated by the Whitley County Historical Society, the museum is located in the Thomas R. Marshall House, listed on the National Register.
Wilbur Wright Birthplace and Museum	Millville	Henry	Central	Biographical	website, birthplace of aviation pioneer Wilbur Wright
Winona History Center	Winona Lake	Kosciusko	North	Local	website, located in the historic Westminster Hotel, now on the campus of Grace College, formerly the Reneker Museum of Winona History
WonderLab	Bloomington	Monroe	South	Science	website
Working Men's Institute Museum	New Harmony	Posey	South	Multiple	website, located on the second floor of Indiana's oldest operating public library, the museum includes the Murphy Gallery and exhibits on local history
World of Motorcycles Museum	Winamac	Pulaski	North	Automotive	website, part of Kersting's Cycle Center, over 100 motorcycles from around the world
Wylie House Museum	Bloomington	Monroe	South	Historic house	Operated by Indiana University, recreated as the Wylie home prior to 1860
Yellow Trail Museum	Hope	Bartholomew	South	Local	website, period displays include soda fountain, grocery store, doctor's office, barber shop
Zaharakos Ice Cream Parlor	Columbus	Bartholomew	South	Music	website, mechanical music instrument and soda fountain museum

== Defunct museums ==
- Brauer Museum of Art, Valparaiso, closed in 2024
- Carter's Toy Museum, Zionsville, closed in 2012
- Clabber Girl Museum, Terre Haute, closed in 2021
- "Collectible Classics" Car Museum, Hagerstown, closed notice
- College Football Hall of Fame, South Bend, closed in 2012 and reopened in Atlanta, Georgia, in 2014
- Colonel Eli Lilly Civil War Museum, Indianapolis, closed; collection acquired by Indiana War Memorial Museum
- Corvette Classics Museum, Fort Wayne
- Dream Car Museum, Evansville
- Forest Discovery Center, Starlight, closed in 2009
- Hannah Lindahl Children's Museum, Mishawaka, closed in 2020
- Hoosier Air Museum, Auburn, closed in 2019
- Hostetler's Hudson Museum, Shipshewana, closed in 2018
- Indiana Aviation Museum, Valparaiso, closed in 2010
- Indiana Historic Radio Museum, Ligonier, closed in 2008
- Indiana Transportation Museum, Logansport, closed in 2023
- Indianapolis Contemporary, Indianapolis, dissolved in 2020
- John Dillinger Museum, Crown Point, closed in 2017
- Karpeles Manuscript Library Museum, Fort Wayne
- The Lincoln Museum, Fort Wayne, closed June 30, 2008
- Mascot Hall of Fame, Whiting, closed September 14, 2024.
- Morris-Butler House, Indianapolis, no longer open for public tours
- National Art Museum of Sport, Indianapolis, dissolved in 2017; reopened as part of the Children's Museum of Indianapolis in 2018
- National Military History Center, Auburn, closed 2019 and redeveloped into Kruse Plaza.
- Ragtops Museum, Michigan City, closed in 2011
- Ropkey Armor Museum, Crawfordsville, closed in 2017
- Snite Museum of Art, Notre Dame, reopened as the Raclin Murphy Museum of Art in 2023
- Trumps' Texaco Museum, Knightstown

== Tourism regions ==
As of June 2024, the Indiana Destination Development Corporation defines three main tourism regions within the state:

=== North ===
The North region generally covers the northern third of Indiana, including 30 counties divided among four sub-regions: Northwest, North Central, Northeast, and Wabash Valley. Among the state's 20 largest cities in 2020, seven are located in the North region: Fort Wayne, South Bend, Hammond, Lafayette, Gary, Elkhart, and Mishawaka. Collectively, the cities are home to approximately 45 museums or galleries. Other cities in the region hosting four or more museums or galleries include Auburn, Michigan City, and Peru.

=== Central ===
The Central region generally covers the middle third of Indiana, including 28 counties divided among three sub-regions: Central, East Central, and West Central. Among the state's 20 largest cities in 2020, nine are located in the Central region: Indianapolis, Carmel, Fishers, Noblesville, Muncie, Greenwood, Kokomo, Terre Haute, and Anderson. Collectively, the cities are home to approximately 60 museums or galleries; Indianapolis-based institutions account for about half (30). Other cities in the region hosting four or more museums or galleries include Crawfordsville and Richmond.

=== South ===
The South region generally covers the southern third of Indiana, including 34 counties divided among four sub-regions: South Central, Southeast, Southwest, and Uplands. Among the state's 20 largest cities in 2020, four are located in the South region: Evansville, Bloomington, Columbus, and Jeffersonville. Collectively, the cities are home to approximately 25 museums or galleries. Other municipalities in the region hosting four or more museums or galleries include Madison, New Albany, Vevay, and Vincennes.

== See also ==
- List of museums in the United States
- List of botanical gardens and arboretums in Indiana
- List of historical societies in Indiana
- List of nature centers in Indiana
- National Register of Historic Places listings in Indiana
- Observatories in Indiana (category)
- Zoos in Indiana (category)
