= National Register of Historic Places listings in Howard County, Indiana =

Location of Howard County in Indiana

This is a list of the National Register of Historic Places listings in Howard County, Indiana.

This is intended to be a complete list of the properties and districts on the National Register of Historic Places in Howard County, Indiana, United States. Latitude and longitude coordinates are provided for many National Register properties and districts; these locations may be seen together in a map.

There are 16 properties and districts listed on the National Register in the county. Another property was once listed but has been removed.

Properties and districts located in incorporated areas display the name of the municipality, while properties and districts in unincorporated areas display the name of their civil township. Properties and districts split between multiple jurisdictions display the names of all jurisdictions.

This National Park Service list is complete through NPS recent listings posted August 29, 2025.

== Current listings ==
	Name on the Register	Image	Date listed	Location	City or town	Description
1	Douglass School	Douglass School	February 9, 2022 (#100007443)	1104 North Bell St. 40°29′46″N 86°07′32″W	Kokomo	
2	Greentown Commercial Historic District	Greentown Commercial Historic District	September 4, 2018 (#100002862)	½ block on either side of Meridian St. between Walnut and Grant; 40°28′40″N 85°58′00″W	Greentown	
3	Elwood Haynes House	Elwood Haynes House	September 20, 1984 (#84001054)	1915 S. Webster St. 40°27′47″N 86°08′13″W	Kokomo	
4	Howard Masonic Temple	Howard Masonic Temple	December 3, 2018 (#100003182)	316 N. Washington St. 40°29′21″N 86°08′02″W	Kokomo	
5	Hy-Red Gasoline Station	Hy-Red Gasoline Station	September 1, 1983 (#83000035)	203 E. Main St. 40°28′40″N 85°57′53″W	Greentown	
6	Kokomo City Building	Kokomo City Building	June 4, 1981 (#81000014)	221 W. Walnut St. 40°29′13″N 86°08′00″W	Kokomo	
7	Kokomo Country Club Golf Course	Kokomo Country Club Golf Course	September 20, 2006 (#06000854)	1801 Country Club Dr. 40°27′43″N 86°08′36″W	Kokomo	
8	Kokomo Courthouse Square Historic District	Kokomo Courthouse Square Historic District	December 22, 2008 (#08001209)	Bounded by Taylor St. on the north, Market St. on the east, Superior St. on the south, and Washington St. on the west 40°29′13″N 86°07′55″W	Kokomo	
9	Kokomo High School and Memorial Gymnasium	Kokomo High School and Memorial Gymnasium	June 17, 2005 (#05000607)	303 E. Superior St. and 400 Apperson Way, N. 40°29′06″N 86°07′39″W	Kokomo	
10	Lake Erie and Western Depot Historic District	Lake Erie and Western Depot Historic District	September 17, 2008 (#08000917)	Generally bounded by W. Jefferson St. on the north, N. Main St. on the east, W. Jackson St. on the south, and N. Washington St. on the west 40°29′24″N 86°07′57″W	Kokomo	
11	Learner Building	Learner Building	September 20, 1984 (#84001055)	107-111 E. Sycamore St. 40°29′10″N 86°07′50″W	Kokomo	
12	Old Silk Stocking Historic District	Old Silk Stocking Historic District	December 22, 2008 (#08001210)	Bounded by W. Jackson St. on the north, Washington St. on the east, Wildcat Creek on the south, and Phillips St. on the west 40°29′20″N 86°08′32″W	Kokomo	
13	Russiaville Interurban Depot		May 16, 2022 (#100007734)	483 East Main St. 40°25′03″N 86°15′55″W	Russiaville	
14	Seiberling Mansion	Seiberling Mansion	December 16, 1971 (#71000006)	1200 W. Sycamore St. 40°29′13″N 86°08′39″W	Kokomo	
15	Henry W. Smith House	Henry W. Smith House	March 9, 1979 (#79000019)	5 miles (8 km) west of Kokomo; 40°28′41″N 86°13′41″W	Clay Township	
16	George and Helen Tate House	George and Helen Tate House	March 6, 2018 (#100002182)	114 E. Jefferson St. 40°29′28″N 86°07′50″W	Kokomo	

== Former listing ==
	Name on the Register	Image	Date listed	Date removed	Location	City or town	Description
1	Frederick Youngman House		February 9, 1979 (#79000020)	March 23, 1993	450 S200E; 40°24′46″N 86°05′20″W	Kokomo	Destroyed by fire after being struck by lightning in June, 1992.

== See also ==
- List of National Historic Landmarks in Indiana
- National Register of Historic Places listings in Indiana
- Listings in neighboring counties: Carroll, Cass, Clinton, Grant, Miami, Tipton
- List of Indiana state historical markers in Howard County
