= GWB =

GWB may refer to:

- Baylor University Golden Wave Band, a marching band
- George W. Bush (born 1946), 43rd president of the United States
- DeKalb County Airport (Indiana) (FAA LID: GWB), a public airport three miles south of Auburn, in DeKalb County, Indiana
- The Geochemist's Workbench, an integrated set of interactive software tools
- George Washington Bridge, a double-decked suspension bridge spanning the Hudson River
- Gravitational wave background, a random background of gravitational waves permeating the universe
- Great Western Bank (South Dakota), a regional bank based in Sioux Falls, South Dakota
- Gwa language (ISO 639-3 code: gwb), one of the Bantu languages spoken in Nigeria
- USS George W. Bush, a planned aircraft carrier of the United States Navy
