= List of Indiana state historical markers in Howard County =

Location of Howard County in Indiana

This is a list of the Indiana state historical markers in Howard County.

This is intended to be a detailed table of the official state historical marker placed in Howard County, Indiana, United States by the Indiana Historical Bureau. The location of the historical marker and its latitude and longitude coordinates are included below when available, along with its name, year of placement, and topics as recorded by the Historical Bureau. There is 2 historical marker located in Howard County.

== Historical marker ==
Marker title	Image	Year placed	Location	Topics
Haynes' Horseless Carriage		1966	Southeastern corner of the junction of U.S. Route 31 and Boulevard Street in Kokomo; 40°27′44.6″N 86°6′29″W	Transportation, Science, Medicine, and Inventions
Indiana University Kokomo		2021	Indiana University Kokomo, Main Building at 2300 S. Washington St., Kokomo; 40°27′36″N 86°08′00″W	Education & Library

== See also ==
- List of Indiana state historical markers
- National Register of Historic Places listings in Howard County, Indiana
