= Indiana Aviation Museum =

- Location within Indiana
- Established: 28 September 2000
- Dissolved: 29 October 2010
- Location: Valparaiso, Indiana
- Coordinates: 41.4496°N 87.0052°W
- Type: Aviation museum
- Founders: Cathy Harrell; James Read
- President: James Read
- Website: in-am.org (Archived)

The Indiana Aviation Museum was an aviation museum located in Valparaiso, Indiana, at the Porter County Regional Airport.

== History ==
Jim Read, a former United States Marine Corps pilot, began collecting warbirds in 1992 with the purchase of a T-34. After a number of years, he began planning for a museum. During the process, he met Cathy Harrell and she joined in the forming of the museum. The museum was incorporated on 28 September 2000 and opened to the public on 19 May 2001.

In 2003, it organized the Porter County Heritage Air Show. The museum's T-28 overran the runway and ended up in a creek on 12 August 2007.

After ten years, the museum closed on 29 October 2010 due to increasing costs. Most of the aircraft were sold and some of the artifacts were planned to go to either the Hoosier Air Museum or Grissom Air Museum.

== Collection ==
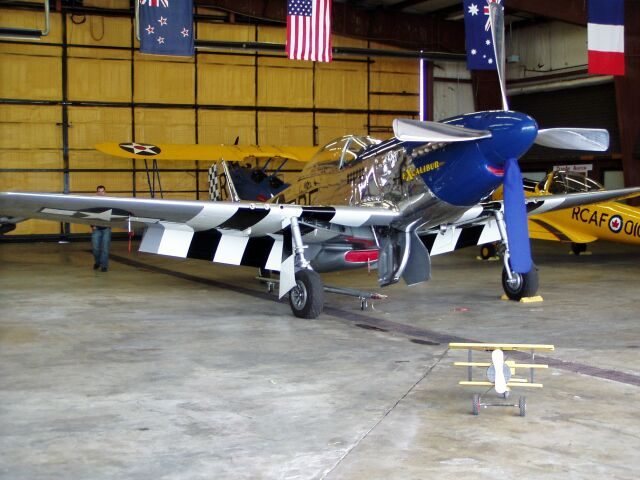
North American P-51D Mustang

=== Aircraft formerly on display ===
- Beechcraft T-34B Mentor
- Boeing PT-17 Kaydet
- Cessna A-37A Dragonfly
- de Havilland Canada DHC-1 Chipmunk
- North American P-51D Mustang
- North American T-6G Texan
- North American T-28B Trojan
- Taylorcraft L-2 Grasshopper
- Van's RV-4
- Vought F4U-5N Corsair

=== Engines formerly on display ===
- Packard V-1650
- Pratt & Whitney R-2800 Double Wasp

== Programs ==
The museum offered rides in a number of its aircraft.
