= Howard Masonic Temple =

Masonic lodge in Kokomo, Indiana, USA

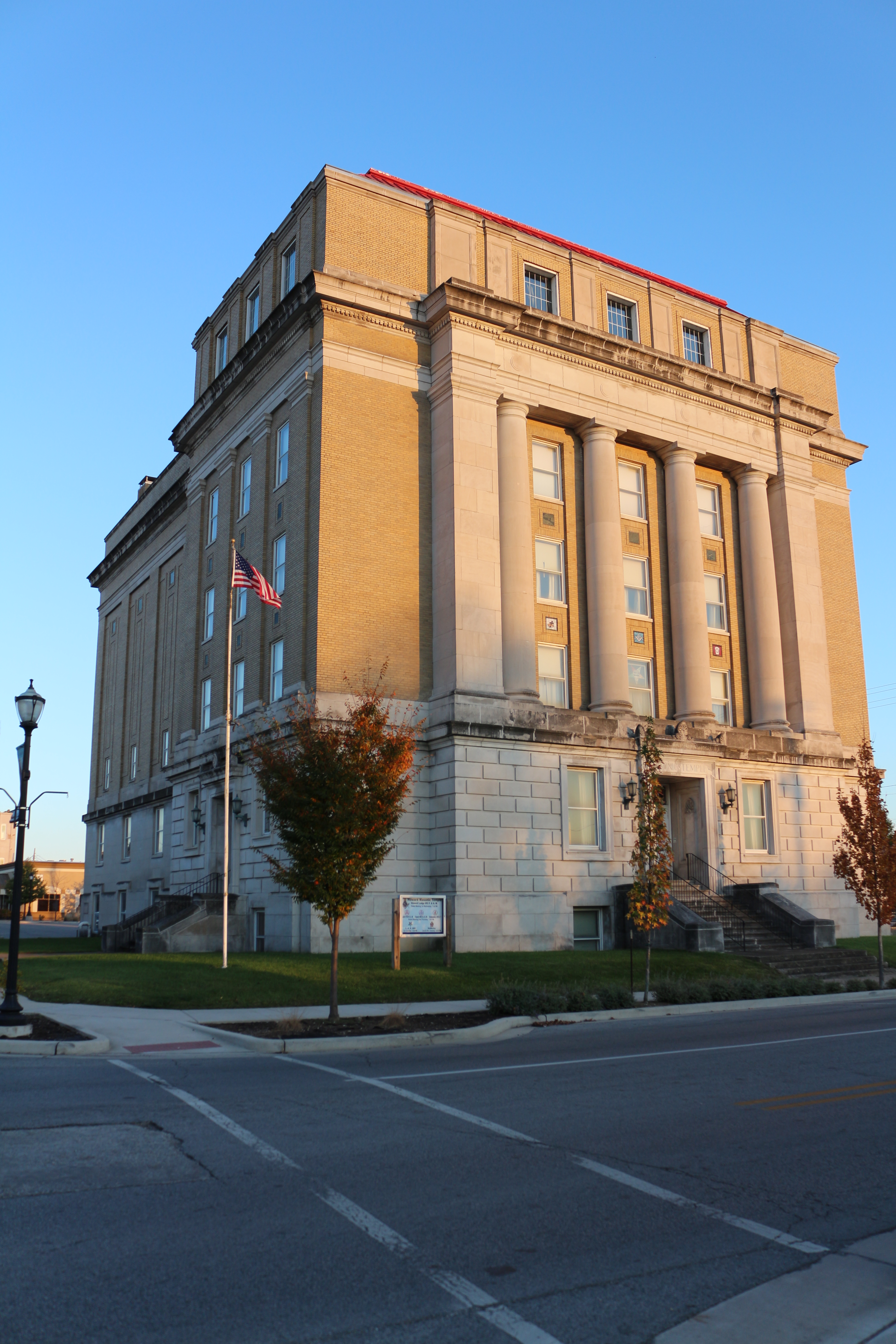
Howard Masonic Temple, exterior view

The Howard Masonic Temple is a historic, Neoclassical Masonic lodge building located in Kokomo, Indiana. Designed by the Elmer Dunlap Company, work for the Temple began in January 1922 and was complete in February 1923.

In 2018, the Temple was placed on the National Register of Historic Places. At the time, it was only the 14th site in Howard County listed on the registry.

== History ==
Howard Masonic Temple currently serves as a meeting place and recreation hall for several Masonic organizations, including the brothers of Howard Lodge No. 93.

In Kokomo, the first Masonic meeting was held in 1849, three years after the first lodge in Howard County was established in New London, Indiana. Kokomo's development as the county seat, with land donated by David Foster, spurred the formation of Kokomo Lodge No. 93.

In 1865, Howard Lodge No. 370 was created when a group of members from the Kokomo Lodge separated to form their own lodge. These two lodges shared a meeting hall until 1879, when they consolidated under the name Howard Lodge No. 93.

== Construction ==
In the early 20th century, Howard Lodge faced challenges in securing a location for its meetings. In 1907, the lodge purchased property at the old Opera House on Walnut and Buckeye Streets with plans for reconstruction. However, due to the high costs involved, the project was abandoned, and the property was sold in 1915. In 1916, the lodge acquired the property at the corner of Union and Mulberry Streets, but once again faced financial challenges when early plans for a new building proved too costly.

In 1917, the lodge agreed to purchase two lots at the southeast corner of Washington and Taylor Streets for $20,000. Plans for the temple were developed by architect Elmer E. Dunlap, and the construction contract was awarded to English Brothers, a construction company from Champaign, Illinois. The total cost of the project, including construction fees, was approximately $206,000.

== See also ==
- List of Masonic buildings in Indiana
- National Register of Historic Places listings in Howard County, Indiana
