= Martin County Courthouse (Indiana) =

- U.S. National Register of Historic Places
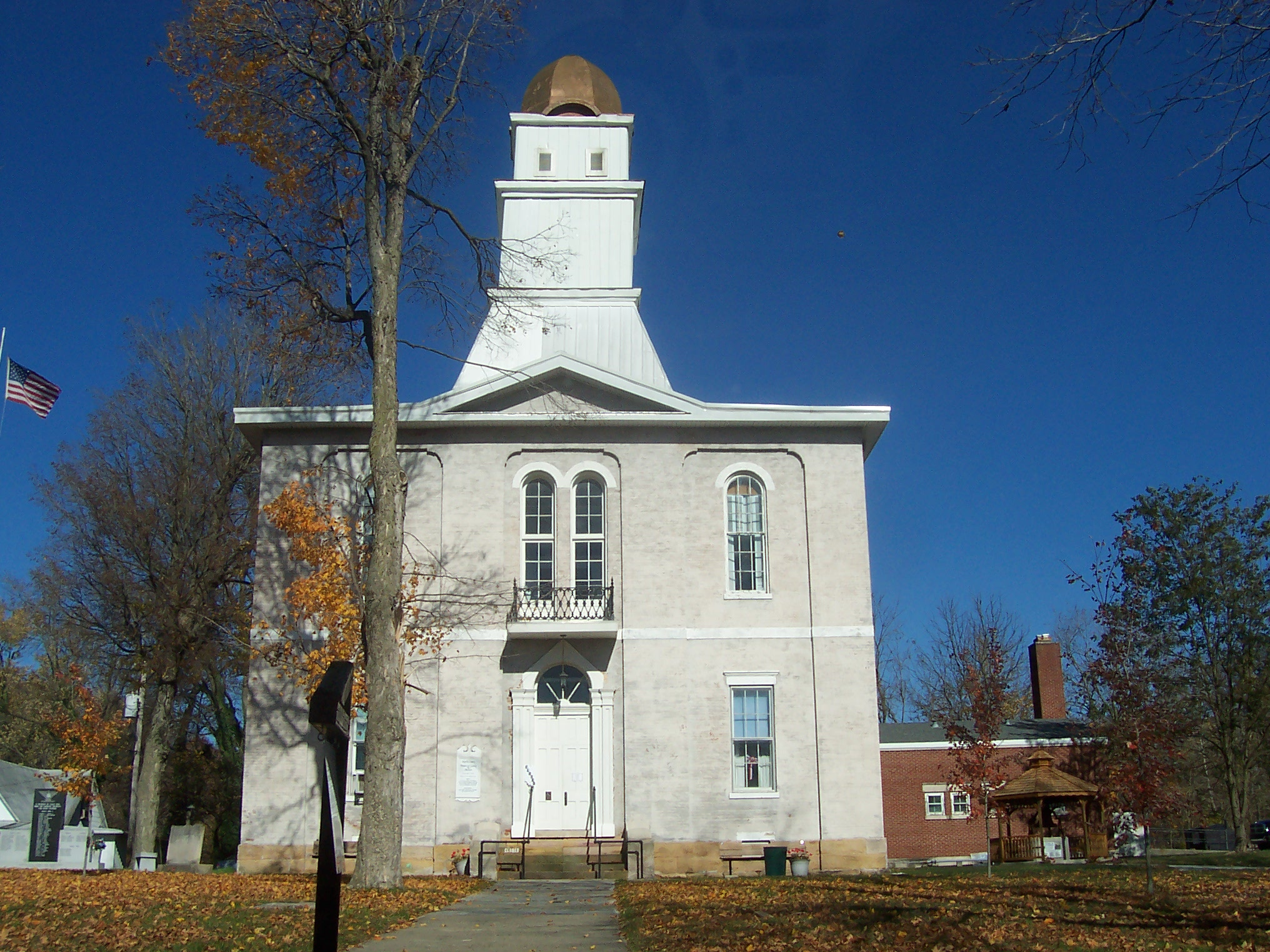

- Location within Martin County, Indiana Location within Indiana Location within the United States
- Location: 220 Capitol Ave., Shoals, Indiana
- Coordinates: 38°40′11″N 86°47′51″W
- Area: less than one acre
- Architect: George, William; Carter, Travis & Benjamin
- Architectural style: Greek Revival, Italianate
- NRHP reference No.: 05000604
- Added to NRHP: June 17, 2005

Martin County Courthouse is a historic courthouse in Shoals, Indiana. The courthouse was built in 1876 to replace the previous courthouse, which burned down in the same year. At the time of the courthouse's construction, Shoals had only been the county seat for seven years, and it was the ninth county seat in Martin County.

The new courthouse was built with local sandstone and red brick; its design incorporates elements of the Greek Revival and Italianate styles.

The new courthouse proved to be in a stable location, as the county seat has remained in Shoals since its construction. The courthouse served the county until 2002 and now houses the Martin County Historical Museum, which is operated by the Martin County Historical Society.

The courthouse was added to the National Register of Historic Places on June 17, 2005.
