= Midtown Museum of Native Cultures =

Coordinates: 40.0882184°N 87.064674°W

The items in the Midtown Museum of Native Cultures are the private collection of Joyce "Koko" Jones, who owns and operates the institution. The museum hold pieces relating to indigenous peoples of the Americas.
