= Southern Indiana Center for the Arts =

Arts center in Indiana, United States

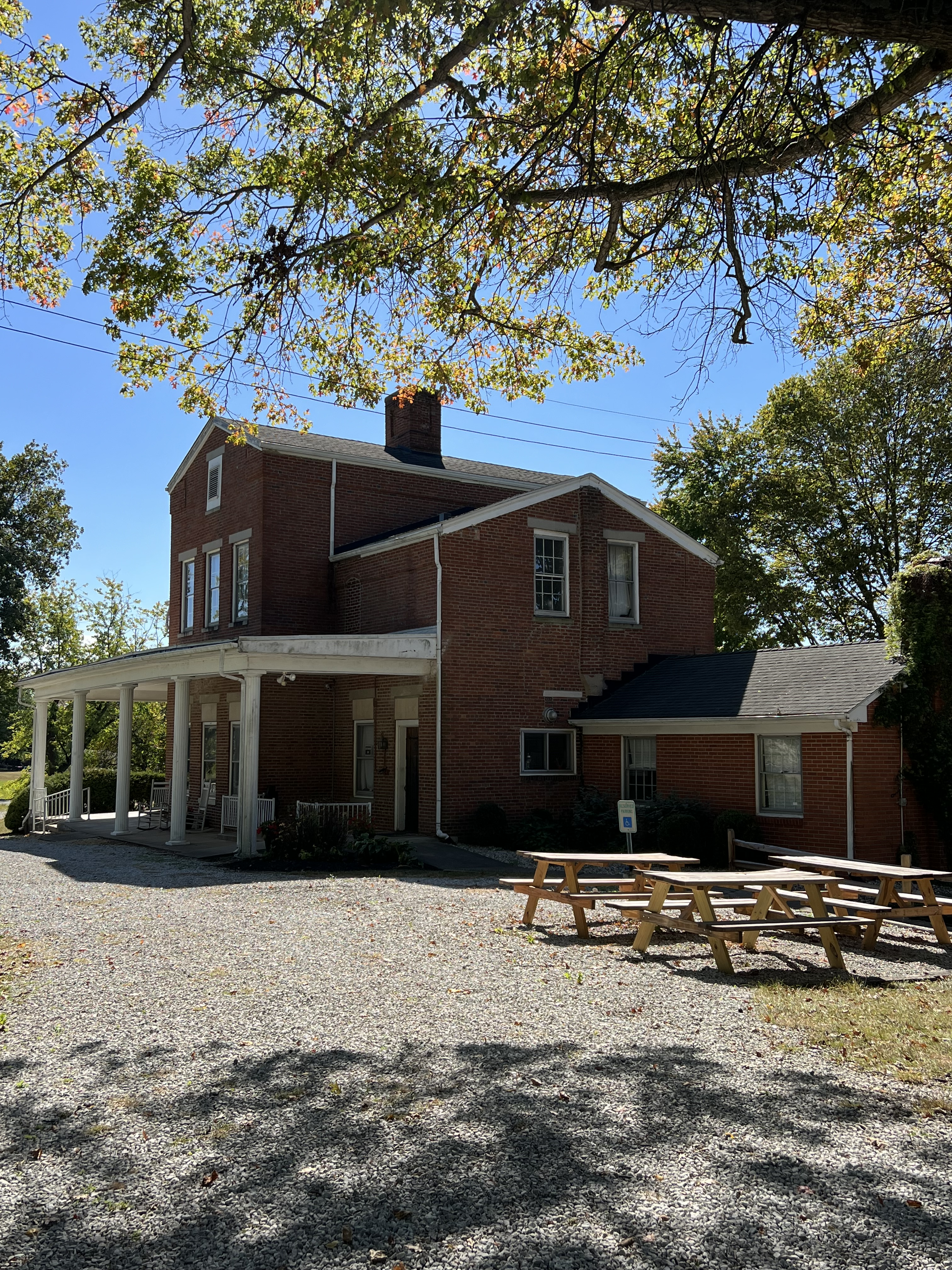
Southern Indiana Center for the Arts, ca 2022

The Southern Indiana Center for the Arts is an American not-for-profit organization originally established in 1990 by singer John Mellencamp near his hometown of Seymour, Indiana. The center, based in a home built in 1851, provides art education for children and adults, a rotating collection of art exhibits, workshops, and provides a space for local artists, SICA also frequently hosts music events. Silas Cheo is the current executive director.

The gallery's collection includes an extensive collection of John Mellencamp's personal art and landscape works by H Vance Swope, and other works. Mellencamp's greatest painting influence is Max Beckmann, the Bob Dylan of painting, Mellencamp has been quoted as saying of the German expressionist. Another influence is Robert Rauschenberg.

SICA is a not-for-profit organization operated by a volunteer board of directors and an executive director. Membership is available.
