= Lighthouse museum =

Type of museum

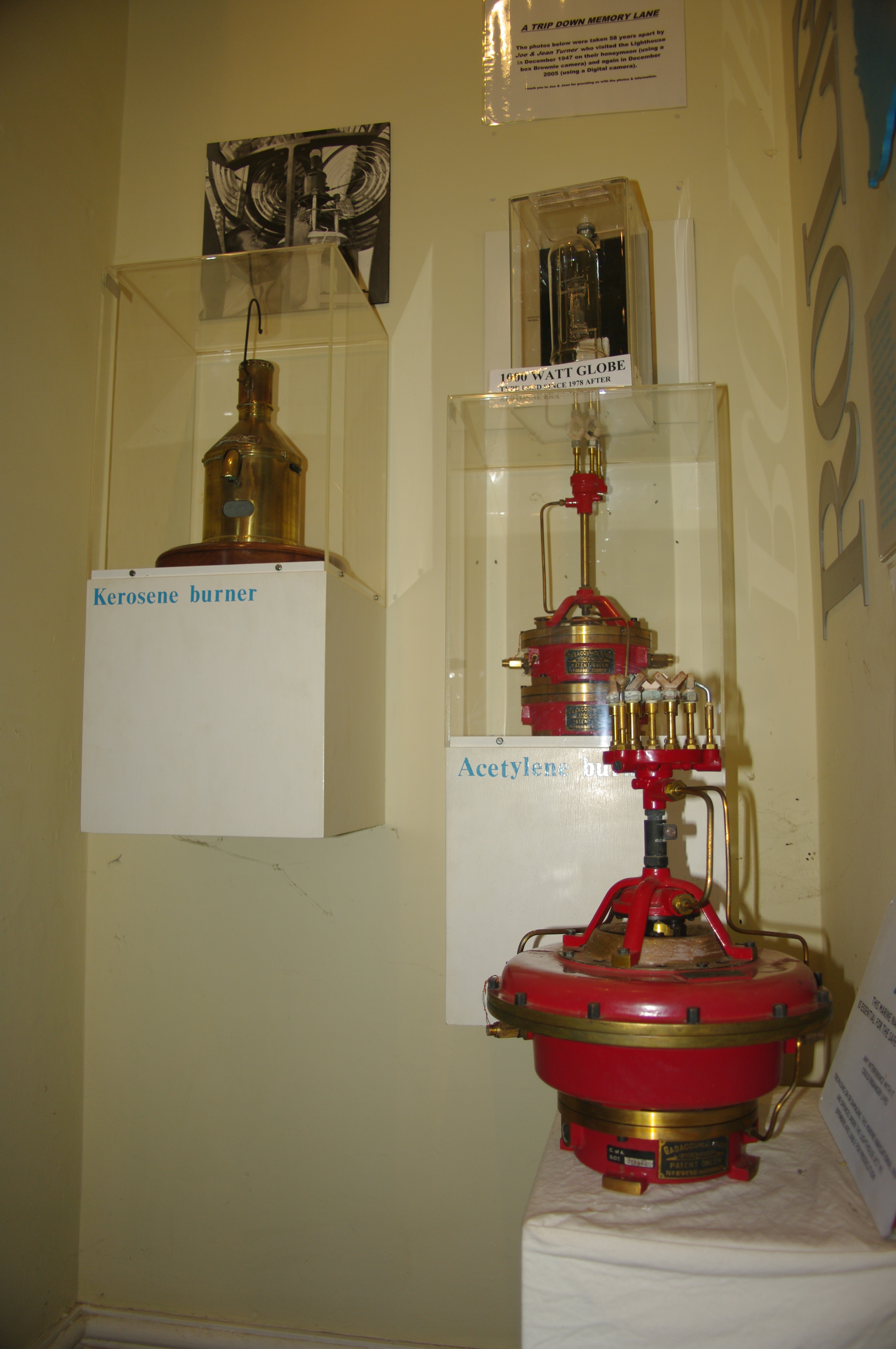
light units on display in the former keeper's residence

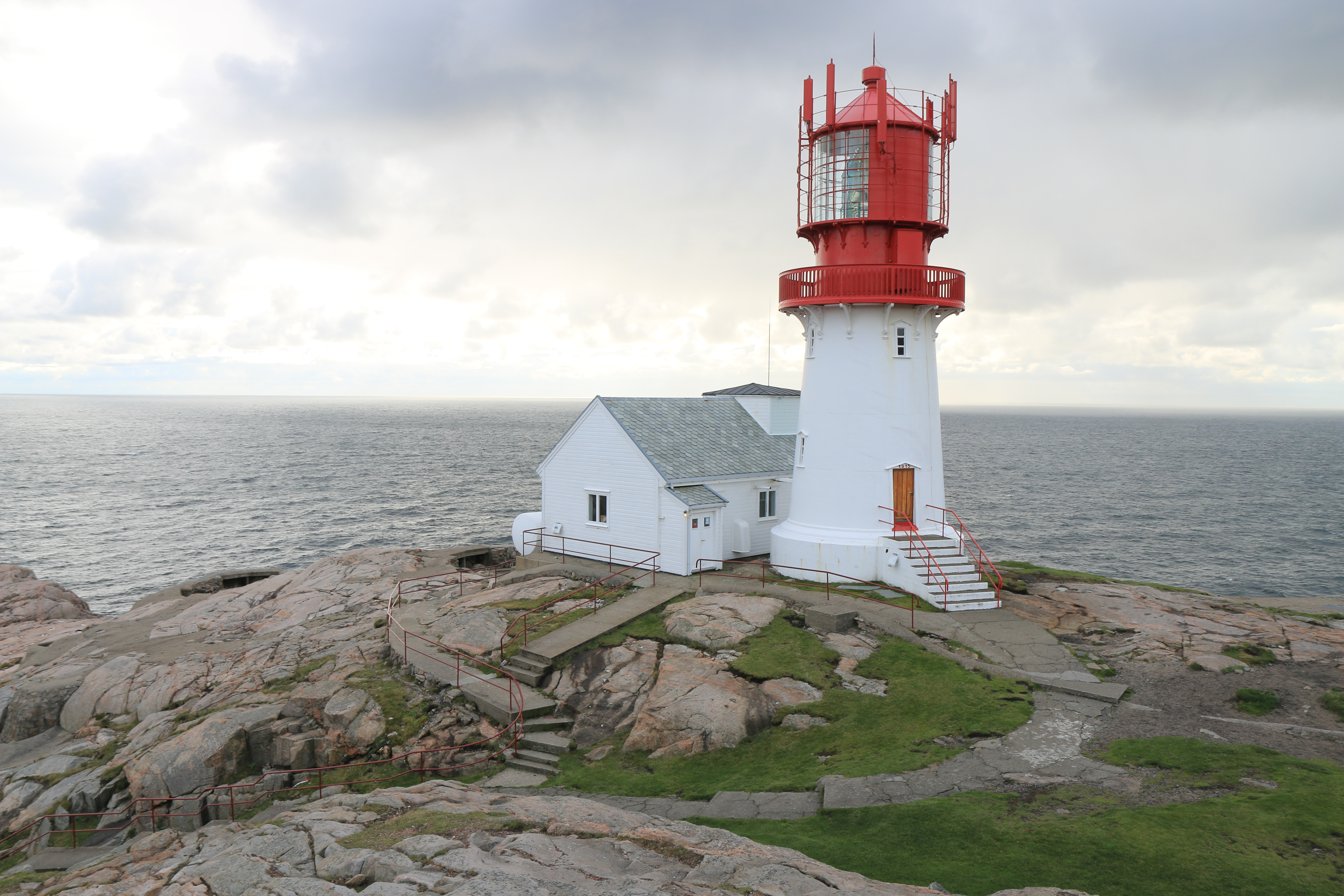
Lindesnes Lighthouse is a lighthouse museum in Norway

A lighthouse museum is a museum specializing in the display of historical objects relating to lighthouses. These museums are either stand alone buildings or are present in lighthouses that are active or inactive. Objects displayed include tools lighthouse keepers used at the time in their everyday lives to maintain the light as well as historic objects such as the Fresnel lens. In addition to navigation, lighthouses in general continue to operate almost as "small maritime museums".

== Lighthouse museums ==
The following is a list of lighthouse museums that are located worldwide. All of these entries are located on lighthouse property which may or may not be privately run, these areas include the lighthouse tower, keepers residence, and other buildings that were built to aid. The entries on this list include reliable sources that must mention a "lighthouse museum" on the given property.

Name	State/Region	Country	Opened (Note: The opening date refers to the current museum.)
Absecon Lighthouse	New Jersey	United States	2002
Anorisaki Lighthouse	Mie	Japan	2004
Ardnamurchan Lighthouse	Scotland	United Kingdom	—N/a
Au Sable Light	Michigan	United States	—N/a
Bald Head Light	North Carolina	United States	—N/a
Barnegat Lighthouse	New Jersey	United States	1954
Battery Point Light	California	United States	—N/a
Beavertail Lighthouse	Rhode Island	United States	1993
Bengtskär Lighthouse	Kimitoön	Finland	1995
Block Island North Light	Rhode Island	United States	1993
Block Island Southeast Light	Rhode Island	United States	—N/a
Bluff Point Light	New York	United States	1986
Browns Point Light	Washington (state)	United States	—N/a
Burnt Coat Harbor Light	Maine	United States	—N/a
Burnt Island Light	Maine	United States	—N/a
Calvert Marine Museum	Maryland	United States	1970
Cana Island Light	Wisconsin	United States	—N/a
Cape Arkona Lighthouse	Mecklenburg-Vorpommern	Germany	—N/a
Cape Forchu Lighthouse	Nova Scotia	Canada	—N/a
Cape Hatteras Lighthouse	North Carolina	United States	—N/a
Cape Jaffa Lighthouse	South Australia	Australia	1976
Cape North Lighthouse	Ontario	Canada	1980
Cape Schanck Lighthouse	Victoria	Australia	—N/a
Charlotte–Genesee Lighthouse	New York	United States	—N/a
Choptank River Light	Maryland	United States	—N/a
Concord Point Light	Maryland	United States	—N/a
Copper Harbor Light	Michigan	United States	—N/a
Cove Point Light	Maryland	United States	—N/a
Crisp Point Light	Michigan	United States	—N/a
Currituck Beach Light	North Carolina	United States	—N/a
Dongquan Lighthouse	Juguang	Taiwan	2008
Dunkirk Light	New York	United States	—N/a
Eagle Bluff Light	Wisconsin	United States	1963
Eagle Harbor Light	Michigan	United States	—N/a
Fairport Harbor Light	Ohio	United States	1945
Fenwick Island Light	Delaware	United States	—N/a
Fort Gratiot Light	Michigan	United States	—N/a
Forty Mile Point Light	Michigan	United States	—N/a
Gasparilla Island Lights	Florida	United States	1999
Grindel Point Light	Maine	United States	—N/a
Hereford Inlet Light	New Jersey	United States	—N/a
Horton Point Light	New York	United States	—N/a
Inubōsaki Lighthouse	Chiba	Japan	—N/a
Jupiter Inlet Light	Florida	United States	2006
Key West Lighthouse	Florida	United States	—N/a
Kinnaird Head Lighthouse	Scotland	United Kingdom	—N/a
Lighthouse of Genoa	Liguria	Italy	2006
Lindesnes Lighthouse	Vest-Agder	Norway	—N/a
Marblehead Light (Ohio)	Ohio	United States	—N/a
Marquette Harbor Light	Michigan	United States	—N/a
McGulpin Point Light	Michigan	United States	—N/a
Mission Point Light	Michigan	United States	—N/a
Montauk Point Light	New York	United States	1987
Mukilteo Light	Washington (state)	United States	—N/a
Navesink Twin Lights	New Jersey	United States	—N/a
New Presque Isle Light	Michigan	United States	—N/a
Nojimazaki Lighthouse	Chiba	Japan	—N/a
Old Mackinac Point Light	Michigan	United States	—N/a
Old Point Loma Lighthouse	California	United States	—N/a
Old Presque Isle Light	Michigan	United States	—N/a
Ontonagon Light	Michigan	United States	—N/a
Pensacola Light	Florida	United States	—N/a
Phare de Gatteville	Manche	France	1997
Piney Point Light	Maryland	United States	—N/a
Point Amour Lighthouse	Newfoundland	Canada	—N/a
Point Cabrillo Light	California	United States	—N/a
Point Fermin Light	California	United States	—N/a
Point Iroquois Light	Michigan	United States	—N/a
Point Pinos Lighthouse	California	United States	—N/a
Point Reyes Lighthouse	California	United States	—N/a
Point Vicente Light	California	United States	—N/a
Pointe aux Barques Light	Michigan	United States	—N/a
Ponce de Leon Inlet Light	Florida	United States	—N/a
Port Burwell Lighthouse	Ontario	Canada	—N/a
Port Washington Light	Wisconsin	United States	—N/a
Portland Head Light	Maine	United States	—N/a
Pottawatomie Light	Wisconsin	United States	—N/a
Presque Isle Light	Pennsylvania	United States	—N/a
Santa Marta Lighthouse	Cascais	Portugal	2007
Saugerties Light	New York	United States	—N/a
Seal Point Lighthouse	Eastern Cape	South Africa	—N/a
Seul Choix Light	Michigan	United States	—N/a
Signal Tower Museum	Scotland	United Kingdom	—N/a
Sodus Point Light	New York	United States	—N/a
South Manitou Island Lighthouse	Michigan	United States	—N/a
Southwold Lighthouse	England	United Kingdom	—N/a
Split Rock Lighthouse	Minnesota	United States	1976
St. Augustine Light	Florida	United States	1994
St Mary's Lighthouse	England	United Kingdom	—N/a
St. Simons Island Light	Georgia	United States	1975
Stonington Harbor Light	Connecticut	United States	—N/a
Sturgeon Point Light	Michigan	United States	—N/a
Świnoujście Lighthouse	West Pomeranian Voivodeship	Poland	2000
Tawas Point Light	Michigan	United States	—N/a
Tuckerton Seaport	New Jersey	United States	1993
Two Harbors Light	Minnesota	United States	—N/a
Umpqua River Light	Oregon	United States	—N/a
West Quoddy Head Light	Maine	United States	—N/a
Whitefish Point Light	Michigan	United States	—N/a
White River Light	Michigan	United States	—N/a
Withernsea Lighthouse	England	United Kingdom	—N/a
Wood Islands Lighthouse	Prince Edward Island	Canada	—N/a
Yaquina Bay Light	Oregon	United States	—N/a
Yaquina Head Light	Oregon	United States	—N/a

== Museums not in lighthouses ==
- National Lighthouse Museum – New York, USA
- National Lighthouse Museum, Pohang – Gyeongsang Province, South Korea
- North Carolina Maritime Museum – North Carolina, USA

== See also ==
- Open-air museum
