= DeKalb County Airport (Indiana) =

- IATA: none; ICAO: KGWB; FAA LID: GWB

Summary
- Airport type: Public
- Owner: DeKalb County Airport Authority
- Location: Auburn, Indiana
- Elevation AMSL: 880 ft (270 m)
- Coordinates: 41°18′26″N 85°03′52″W
- Website: http://www.dekalbcountyairport.com/

Map
- Location of airport in Indiana GWB (the United States)

Runways
Direction	Length		Surface
Direction	ft	m	Surface
9/27	5,000	1,524	Asphalt

DeKalb County Airport (ICAO: KGWB, FAA LID: GWB) is a public airport 3 miles (4.8 km) south of Auburn, in DeKalb County, Indiana. The airport was founded in October 1964 to replace the old Auburn Airport.

The Hoosier Air Museum was located at the airport before the former closed.

== See also ==
- List of airports in Indiana
