= Science Central =

Museum in Fort Wayne, Indiana, U.S.

Coordinates: 41.091852°N 85.139409°W

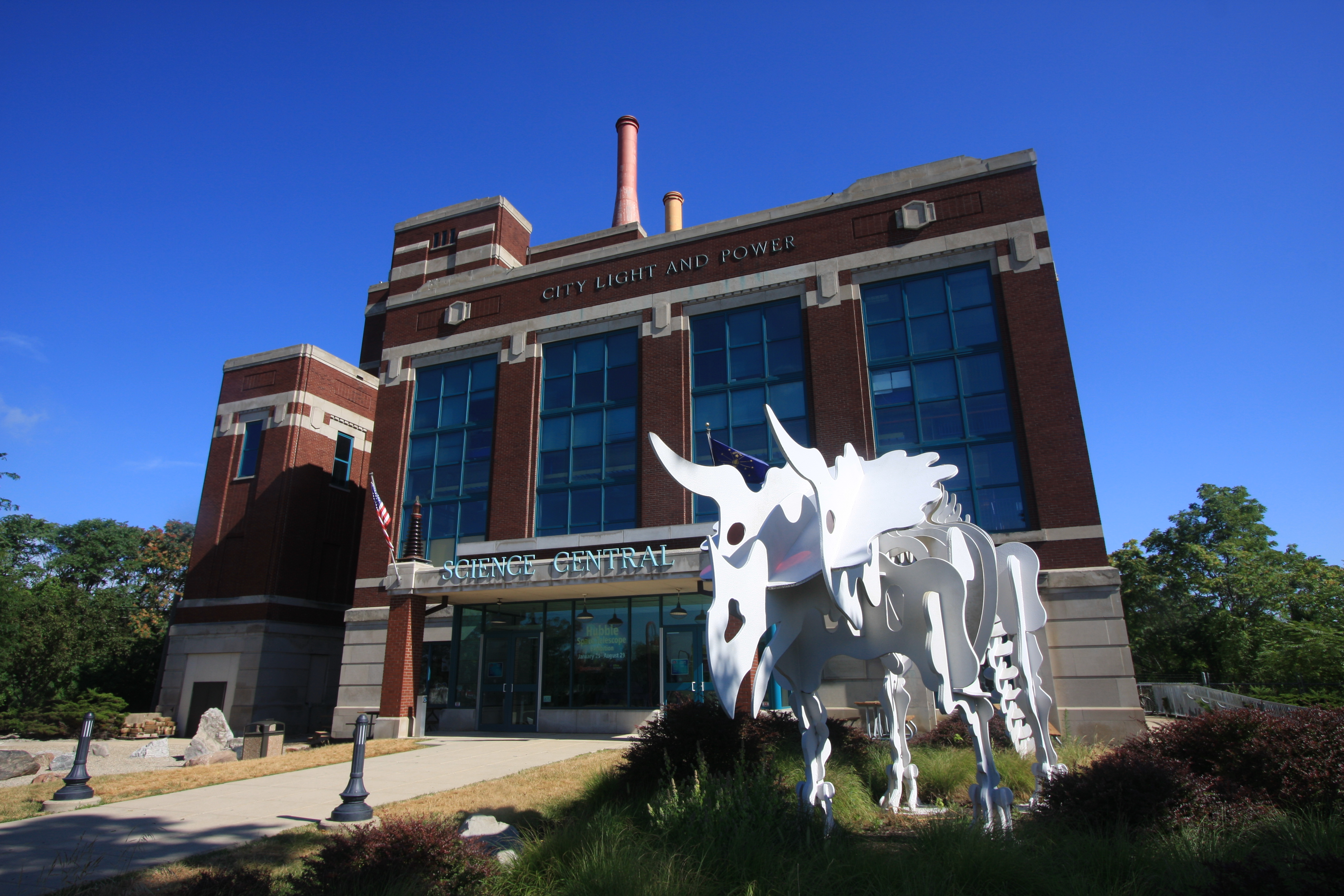
Science Central opened in the city's former municipal power plant in 1987.

Science Central is an interactive science center in Fort Wayne, Indiana.

== Location ==
It was assigned for its founding the old building, which was built and expanded in 1929, located on North Clinton Street, and which was previously used by City Light and Power Plant, and which stood idle for some time. Science Central opened in the year 1987.
