= Gary Land Company Building =

- U.S. National Register of Historic Places
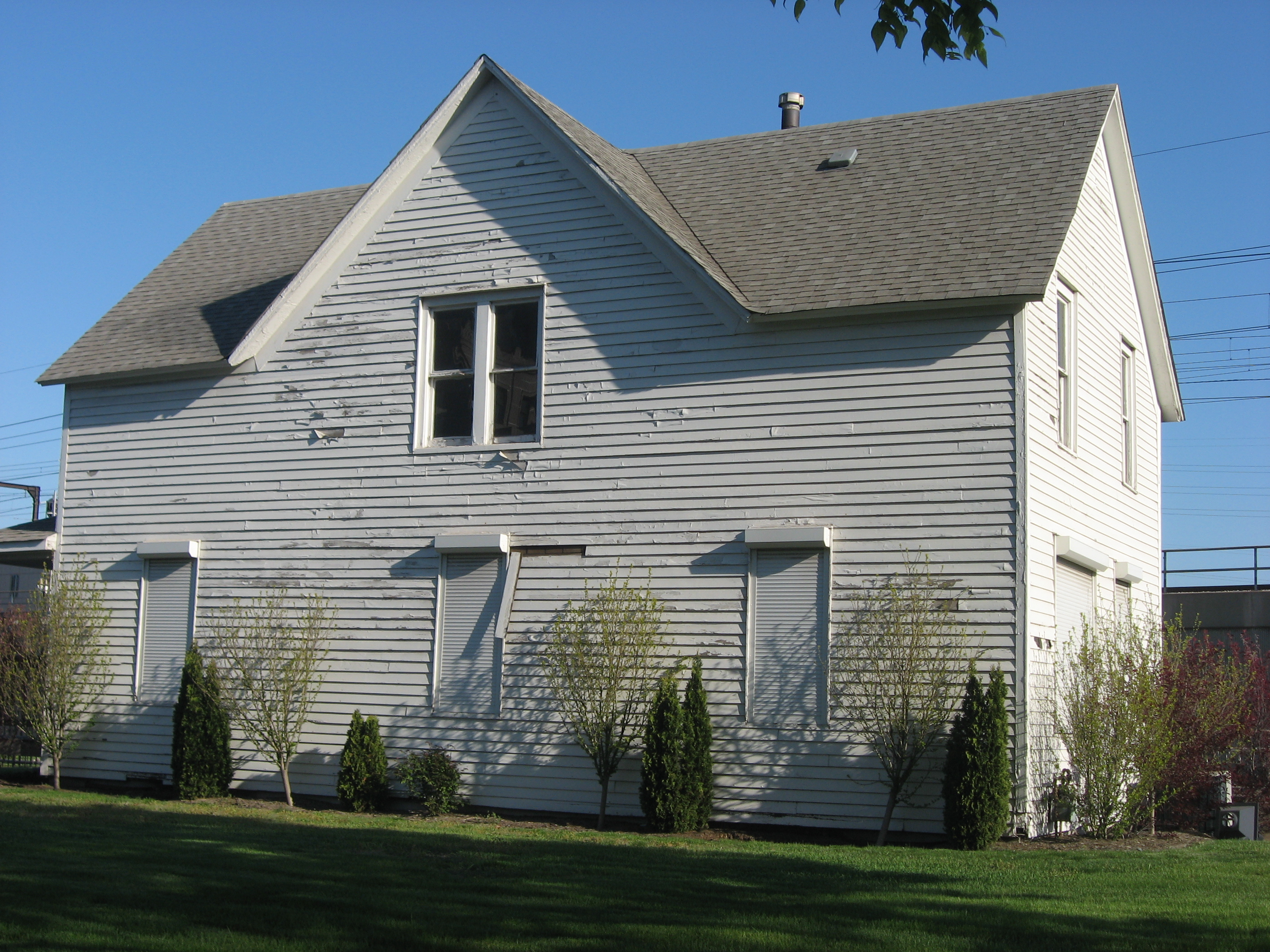
- Gary Land Company Building, April 2012

- Location within Indiana Location within the United States
- Location: 4th Ave. and Pennsylvania St., Gary, Indiana
- Coordinates: 41°36′15″N 87°20′0″W
- Area: 0.1 acres (0.040 ha)
- Built: 1906
- NRHP reference No.: 79000021
- Added to NRHP: May 8, 1979

Gary Land Company Building, also known as Gary's First Town Hall, is a historic building located at Gary, Indiana. It was built in 1906, and is a 1 1/2-story, balloon frame building with a cross-gable roof. It measures about 20 feet wide and 40 feet deep. It was converted to a residence in 1909 and moved to its present site in 1956. It was the first building in Gary, it has functioned as a city hall, post office, school, and business building. The building currently serves as an historical museum and visitor's bureau for school tour groups and visitors to the City of Gary.

It was listed on the National Register of Historic Places in 1979.
