= Frederick Youngman House =

Historic house in Indiana, United States

- Formerly listed on the U.S. National Register of Historic Places
- Nearest city: Kokomo, Indiana
- Area: 2 acres (0.81 ha)
- Built: 1876
- Architectural style: Italianate
- NRHP reference No.: 79000020

Significant dates
- Added to NRHP: February 9, 1979
- Removed from NRHP: March 23, 1993

The Frederick Youngman House was a historic home located in Kokomo, Indiana. It was built in 1876, and was a two-story, Italianate style brick dwelling. It featured a wide, bracketed wood cornice. It was destroyed by fire after being struck by lightning in June 1992.

It was added to the National Register of Historic Places in 1979 and delisted in 1993.
