= Seiberling Mansion =

Historic house in Indiana, United States

- U.S. National Register of Historic Places
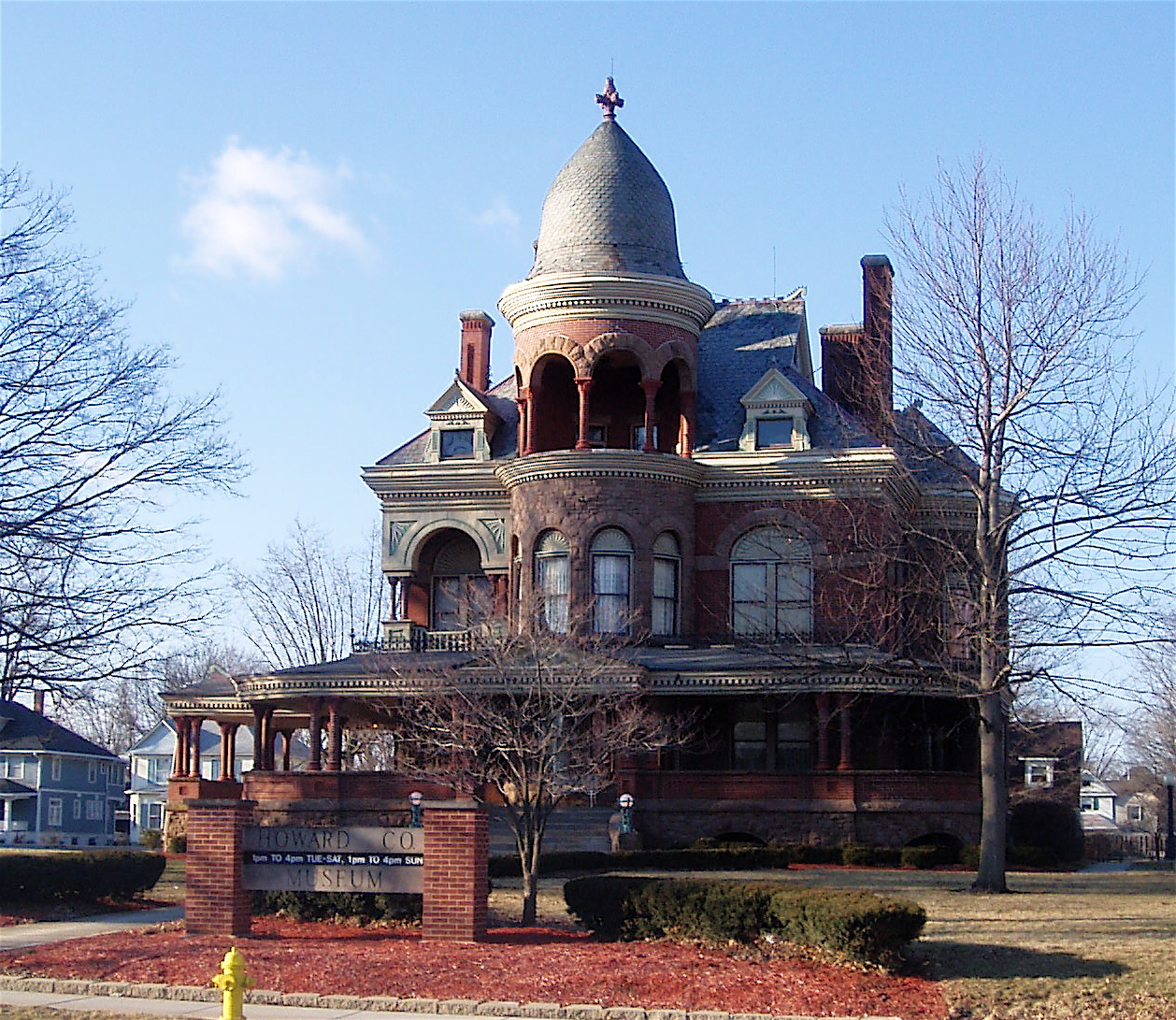
- Front of the mansion

- Location within Indiana Location within the United States
- Location: 1200 W. Sycamore St., Kokomo, Indiana
- Coordinates: 40°29′13″N 86°8′39″W
- Area: 1.5 acres (0.61 ha)
- Built: 1889
- Architect: Arthur Labelle; Ike V. Smith
- Architectural style: Queen Anne and Romanesque Revival
- NRHP reference No.: 71000006
- Added to NRHP: December 16, 1971

The Seiberling Mansion is a historic house located at Kokomo, Indiana, United States. In 1887, Monroe Seiberling of Akron, Ohio, traveled to Kokomo to open the Kokomo Strawboard Company, which would make shoe boxes out of straw and employ seventy-five people. Within six months, Seiberling, uncle of Goodyear Tire and Rubber Company founder Frank Seiberling, sold the Kokomo Strawboard Company and opened the Diamond Plate Glass Company. He began construction on his mansion in October 1889 at a cost of $50,000, with construction ending within two years. The mansion is built in a mixture of Queen Anne and Romanesque Revival styles.

In 1972, the Seiberling Mansion was listed on the National Register of Historic Places. It is located in the Old Silk Stocking Historic District.

The mansion is owned by the Howard County Historical Society and serves as the location of the Howard County Museum.
