= Hoosier Air Museum =

- Location within Indiana
- Established: October 2000
- Dissolved: 3 December 2019
- Location: Auburn, Indiana
- Coordinates: 41.3041°N 85.0593°W
- Type: Aviation museum
- Founder: Niles Walton
- Website: hoosierairmuseum.org (Archived)

The Hoosier Air Museum was an aviation museum located at the DeKalb County Airport in Auburn, Indiana.

== History ==
=== Background ===
The Hoosier Warbirds were founded by a group of aviation enthusiasts who met in October 1991 following the publication of a classified advertisement in a local newspaper.

=== Establishment ===
The group raised money to build a hangar, which opened in October 2000. It acquired a Cadillac Fleetwood and an AH-1 in 2002.

The museum acquired two airplanes, four engines and an exhibit about the 434th Fighter Squadron from the Wings of Freedom Museum in Huntington, Indiana in 2006. (Note: The founder of that museum, James Shuttleworth, had been killed in the crash of a P-51 in 2003 and the museum closed since then.)

=== Closure ===
Due to a lack of volunteers and difficulty accessing the site, the museum closed on 3 December 2019. Most of its exhibits were donated to Kruse Plaza, which opened the Hoosier Air Experience. However, the museum's WR-3 was donated to the National Air and Space Museum in 2020.

== Facilities ==
The museum was composed of a 10,000 sq ft (930 m^{2}) hangar and a 6,375 sq ft (592.3 m^{2}) event hall. The latter included a library.

== Exhibits ==
The museum included exhibits about the Tuskegee Airmen, the Women Airforce Service Pilots, the Flying Tigers the atomic bombings of Hiroshima and Nagasaki, memorabilia belonging to Robin Olds and a control tower cab.

== Collection ==
- Bell AH-1F Cobra
- Brunner-Winkle Speedbird
- Cessna T-50
- Fokker D.VII – replica
- Loving-Wayne WR-3
- Model RHC1 Helicopter
- Nieuport XI – 7/10 scale replica
- Nieuport XXIV – 3/4 scale replica
- Piper J3C Cub
- Pitts S-1 Special
- Pratt-Read LNE-1
- Stewart S-51D Mustang
- Vultee V-77
