= Old Silk Stocking Neighborhood =

Historic district in Indiana, United States

- Old Silk Stocking Historic District
- U.S. National Register of Historic Places
- U.S. Historic district
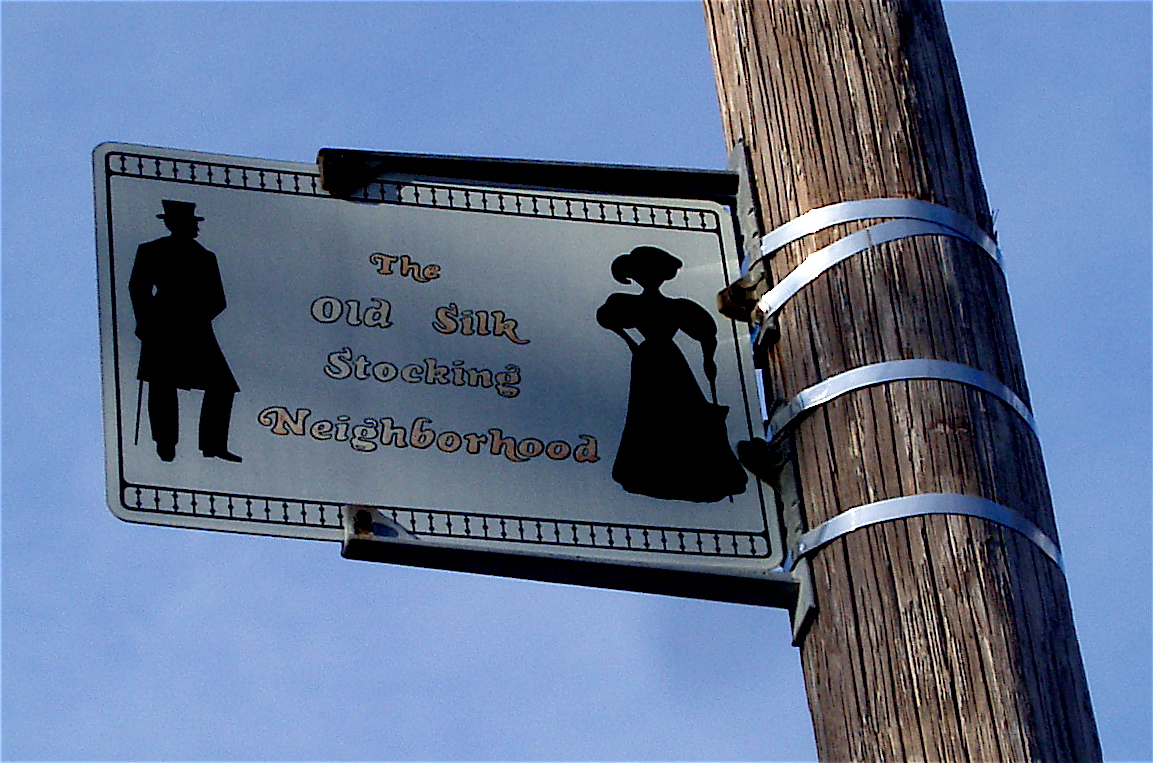
- Neighborhood Markers

- Location within Indiana Location within the United States
- Location: Bounded by W. Jackson St. on the N., Washington St. on the E., Wildcat Creek in the S., Phillips St. on the W., Kokomo, Indiana
- Coordinates: 40°29′20″N 86°08′32″W
- Area: 110 acres (45 ha)
- Built: 1880s
- Architect: Multiple
- Architectural style: Victorian, Neo-Jacobean, Queen Anne, Bungalow, Tudor Revival, Colonial Revival, Romanesque Revival
- NRHP reference No.: 08001210
- Added to NRHP: December 22, 2008

The Old Silk Stocking Neighborhood is the historic district near downtown Kokomo, Indiana, and the Westside Business District. In 1886, natural gas was discovered in north central Indiana. The area exploded with people, who then developed the neighborhood. This historic area of town was the place where lawyers, doctors, industrialists and even a mayor would come to build their turn of the century residences.

The neighborhood is bounded by Washington Street to the east, Philips Street to the west, Wildcat Creek to the south and Taylor Street to the North. Major roadways traversing through the Old Silk Stocking Neighborhood include Sycamore Street (Indiana State Road 22) running east and west and Washington Street and Philips Street traveling north and south. Recently in 2005, Sycamore Street (SR 22) began a complete redesign resulting in an addition of a center turn lane, as well as old-fashioned lighting and ornamental trees with construction ending in late 2006.

On December 22, 2008, the neighborhood was placed on the National Register of Historic Places. Its official boundaries are "W. Jackson St. on the N., Washington St. on the E., Wildcat Creek in the S., Phillips St. on the W.".

== Architecture ==
The Old Silk Stocking Neighborhood is an eclectic mix of architectural styles including Victorian, Neo-Jacobean, Queen Anne, Bungalow, Tudor Revival, Colonial Revival, and Romanesque Revival.

== Landmarks ==
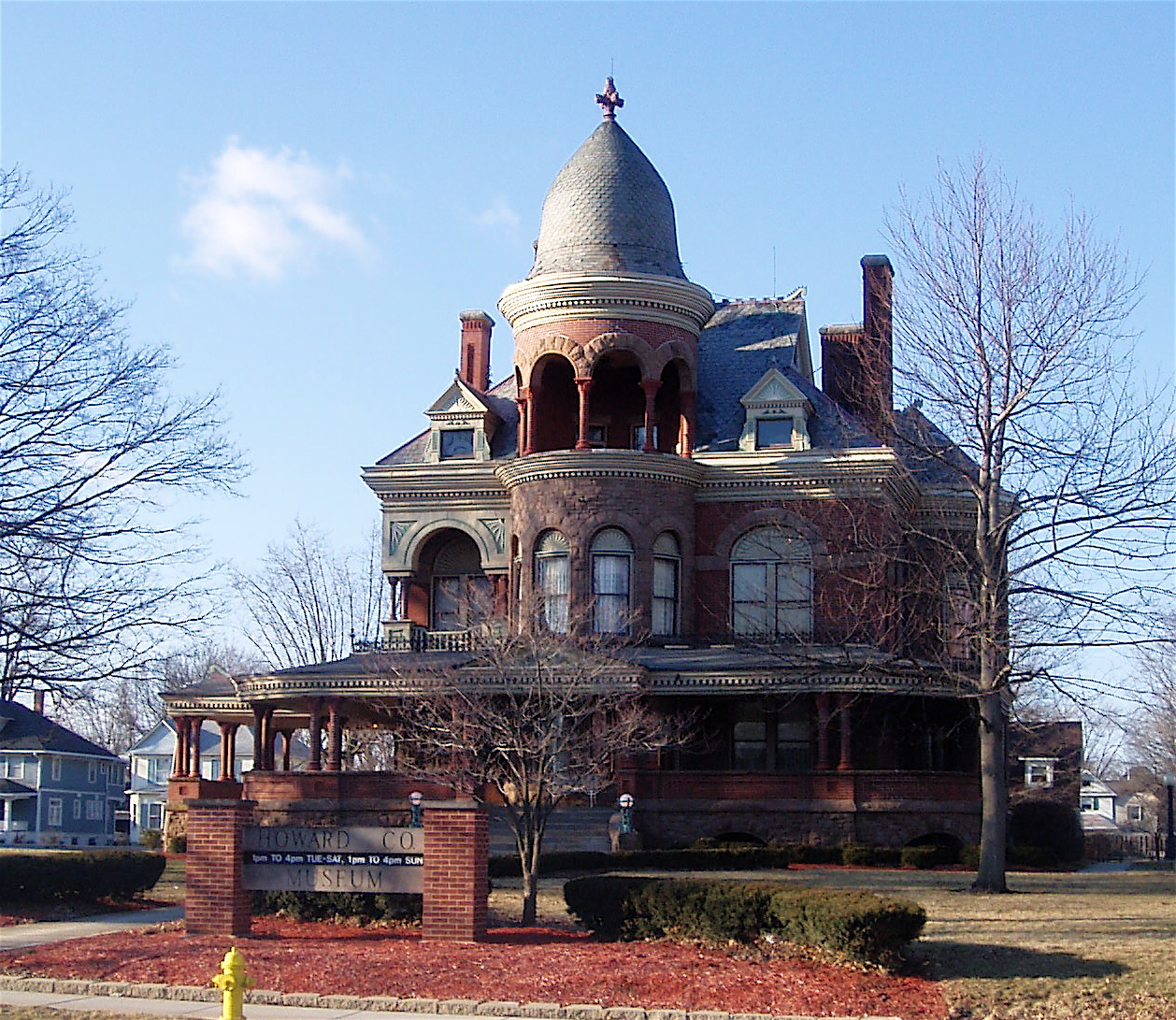
Seiberling Mansion

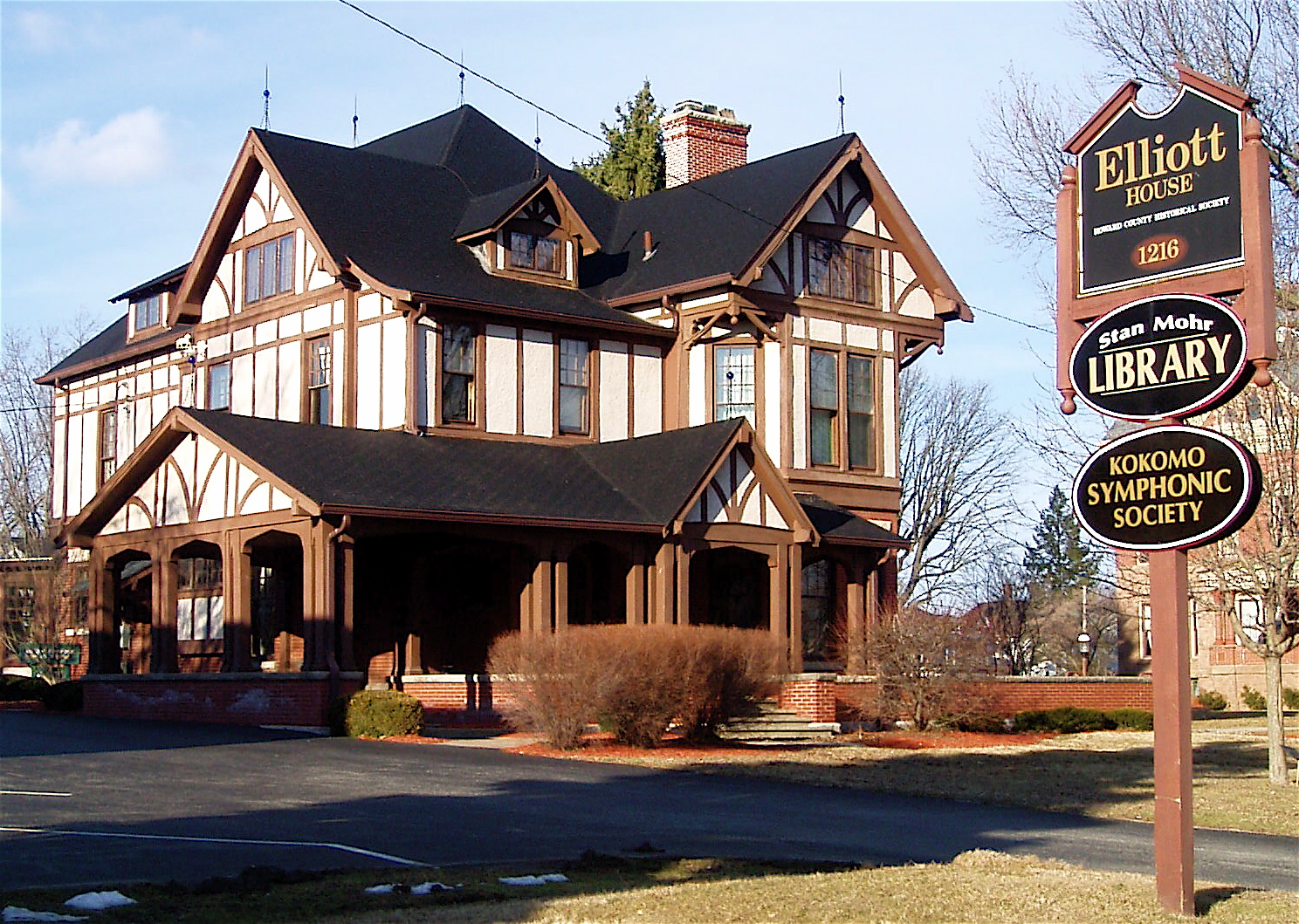
Elliott House

=== Howard County Historical Society and Museum ===
The Howard County Museum is located on West Sycamore Street and inhabits the Seiberling Mansion, the Elliott House, as well as two historic carriage houses owned by the two families which built the two massive residences. The Howard County Museum is open during the week and showcases local history including information about the founders of Kokomo, and the Seiberlings. Also available by the museum is a live reenactment of the marriage of Monroe Seiberling's daughter, as well as a venue for local weddings.

The Seiberling Mansion is an 1887 house built by manufacturing magnate Monroe Seiberling. It was separately listed on the National Register in 1972.

The Elliott House is located next door to the Seiberling Mansion and is home to the Kokomo Symphonic Society, as well as a few professional offices. The Elliott Carriage house was recently renovated to house the Stan Mohr Local History Library. After the original residents of the Elliott House moved out, the house was purchased and was used for a location for Indiana University Kokomo, until it moved to its current location on South Washington Street.

==== Christmas at the Seiberling ====
During the holiday season, the Seiberling Mansion and the Elliott House host a plethora of events for all ages to enjoy. One of the most striking features of the holiday events would be the lighting of both the Seiberling Mansion, Elliott House and the grounds accommodating both buildings. Activities held at the Howard County Historical Society would include horse-drawn carriage rides, pictures with Santa Claus, a gingerbread competition, as well as touring the decorated mansion. Also available during this time are Choralier performances and refreshments.

== Religious Centers ==
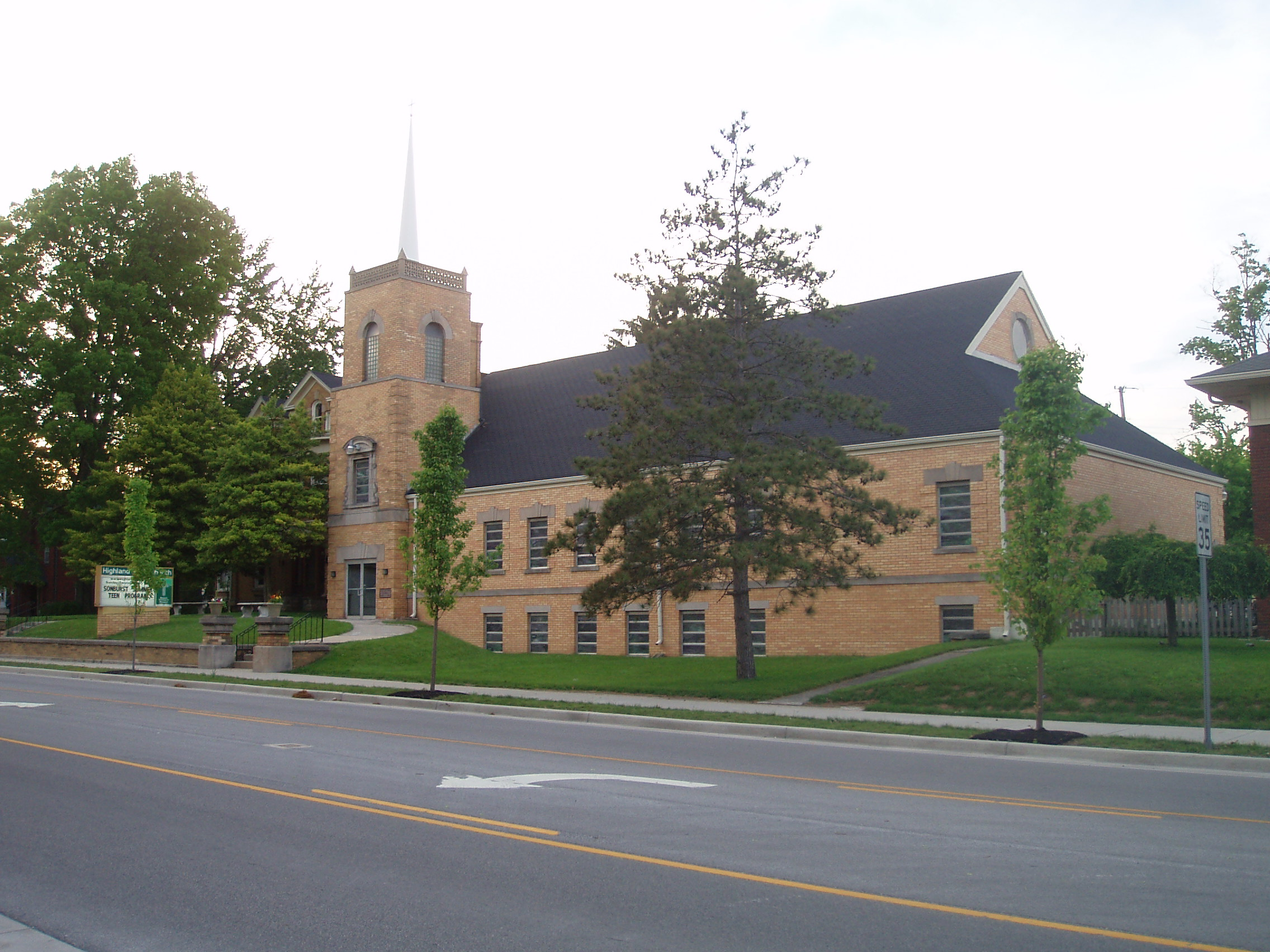
Highland Park Church

Of the large variety of religious centers within the Old Silk Stocking Neighborhood area, St. Andrew's Episcopal Church and Highland Park Church are two of the more prominent churches within the neighborhood.
A list of religious centers within the neighborhood include:

- St. Andrew's Episcopal Church
- Highland Park Church
- St. Thomas the Apostle Orthodox Christian Church
- First Congregational UCC
- Fresh Start Ministries
- The Father's House Church
- Temple B'nai Israel

== Parks ==
=== Foster Park ===
Christened in 1921 and named after David Foster, the founder of Kokomo, this park is home to the Senior Citizen's Center, tennis courts, basketball courts, a softball diamond, as well as an outdoor concert venue. Another feature to this park is the Wildcat Walk of Excellence which runs through the park connecting Foster Park to Miller-Highland Park.

=== Miller-Highland Park ===
Better known as U.C.T. Ballpark by local residents, this park boasts two little-league baseball diamonds, Indian trails, as well as two playgrounds.

== Businesses ==
- Guardian Angel Hospice Foundation, Inc.
- Crazy J's Ice Cream
- Templin Barber Shop
- Horoho Printing
- Kokomo Smile Creations

== Gallery ==
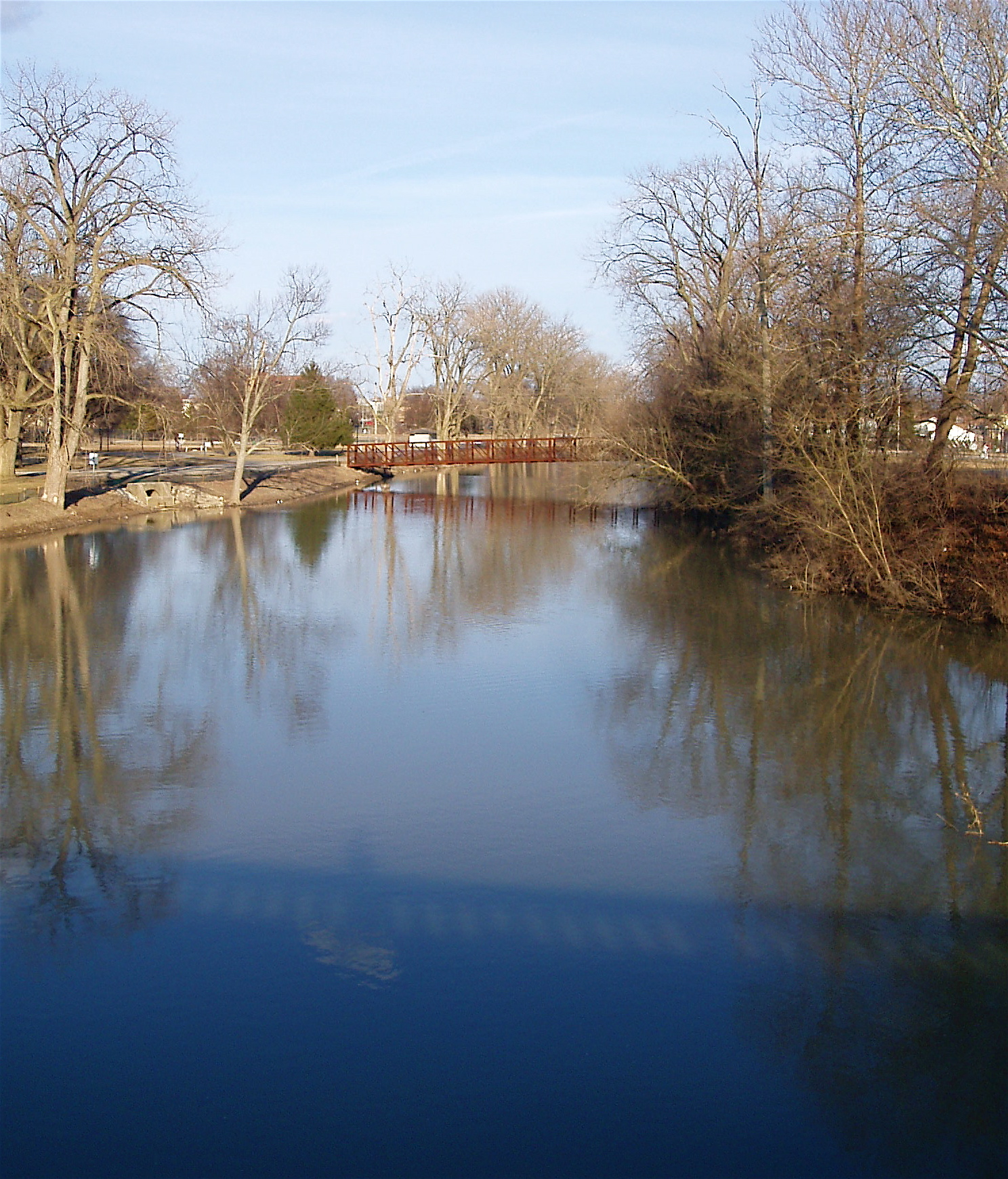
Wildcat Creek, Foster Park located on the Left, Kokomo Beach Family Aquatic Center on the Right

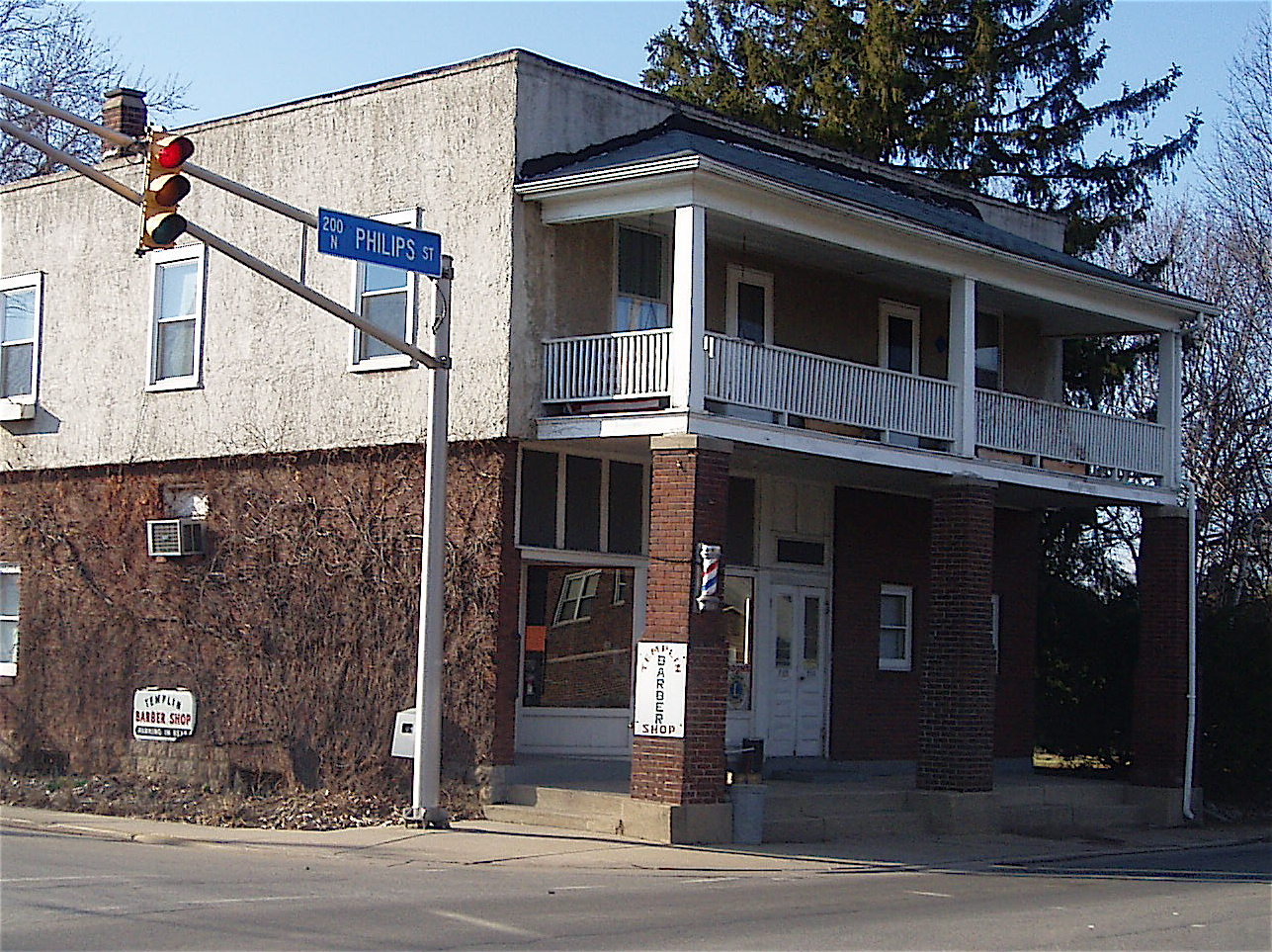
Templin Barber Shop

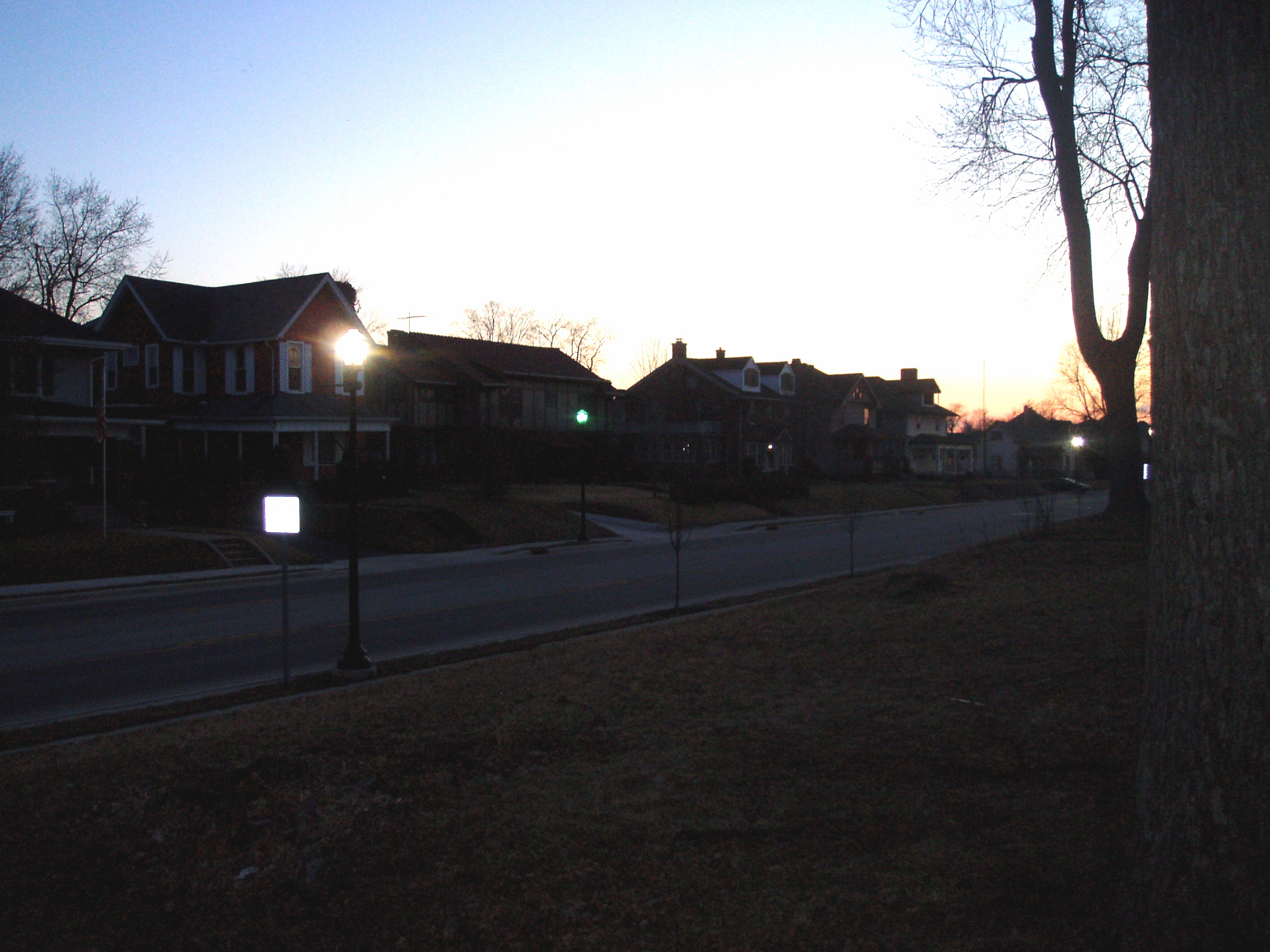
Sycamore St. at Dusk

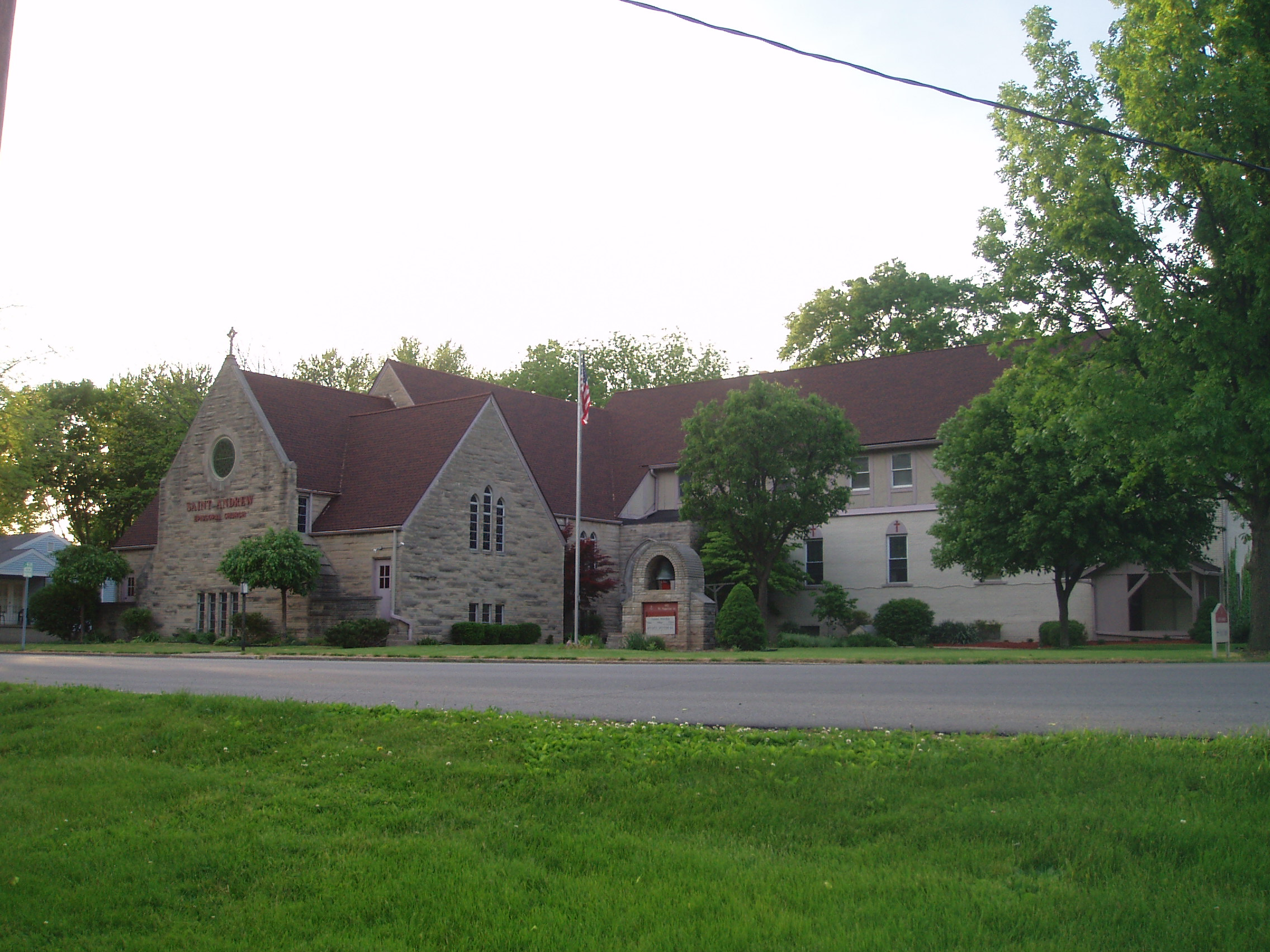
St. Andrews Episcopal Church
