= Duryea Power =

Duryea Power Company was a manufacturer of Brass Era automobiles in Reading, Pennsylvania. It was one of several similarly named companies that early automobile pioneer Charles Duryea was involved with.

The 1904 Duryea Straight-Line Phaeton was a phaeton model. It could seat 2 passengers and sold for US$1350. The slant-mounted straight-3, situated amidships of the car, produced 12 hp (8.9 kW). The wood and iron-framed car weighed 950 lb (431 kg) and was noted for its high-speed capability. It had a 72" wheelbase.

The 1904 Duryea Tonneau was a tonneau version and could seat 5 to 7 passengers. It sold for US$1750. The armored wood-framed car weighed 1350 lb (612 kg). It had a 3-cylinder, 12 hp engine, a 2-speed manual transmission, and a 95" wheelbase.

== See also ==
- Duryea Motor Wagon Company
- Duryea Motor Wagon
- Stevens-Duryea
- Charles Duryea
- Frank Duryea
