= Charles Duryea =

American automobile manufacturer

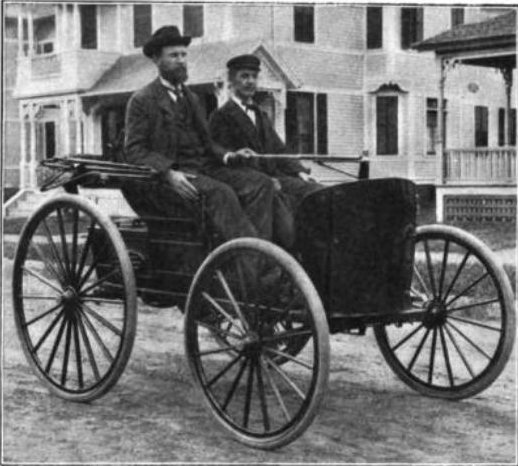
- Charles Duryea (left) with J. Frank Duryea
- Born: December 15, 1861; Canton, Illinois, U.S.
- Died: September 28, 1938 (aged 76); Philadelphia, Pennsylvania, U.S.
- Resting place: Ivy Hill Cemetery, Philadelphia, Pennsylvania, U.S.

Charles Edgar Duryea (December 15, 1861 – September 28, 1938) was an American engineer. He was the engineer of the second working American gasoline-powered car and co-founder of Duryea Motor Wagon Company. He was born near Canton, Illinois, a son of George Washington Duryea and Louisa Melvina Turner, and died in Philadelphia, Pennsylvania, but spent most of his life working in Springfield, Massachusetts.

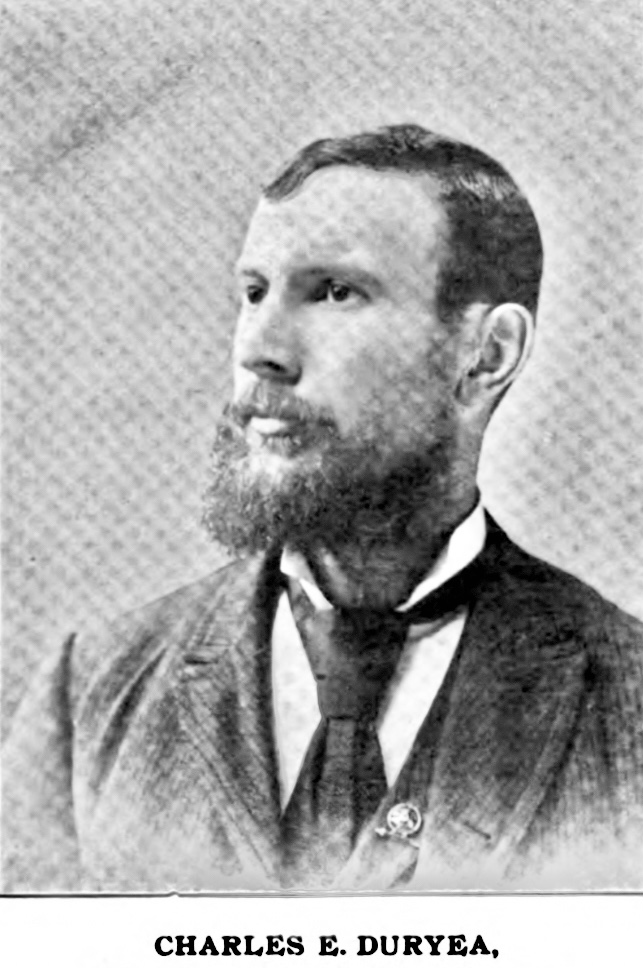
Charles Edgar Duryea.

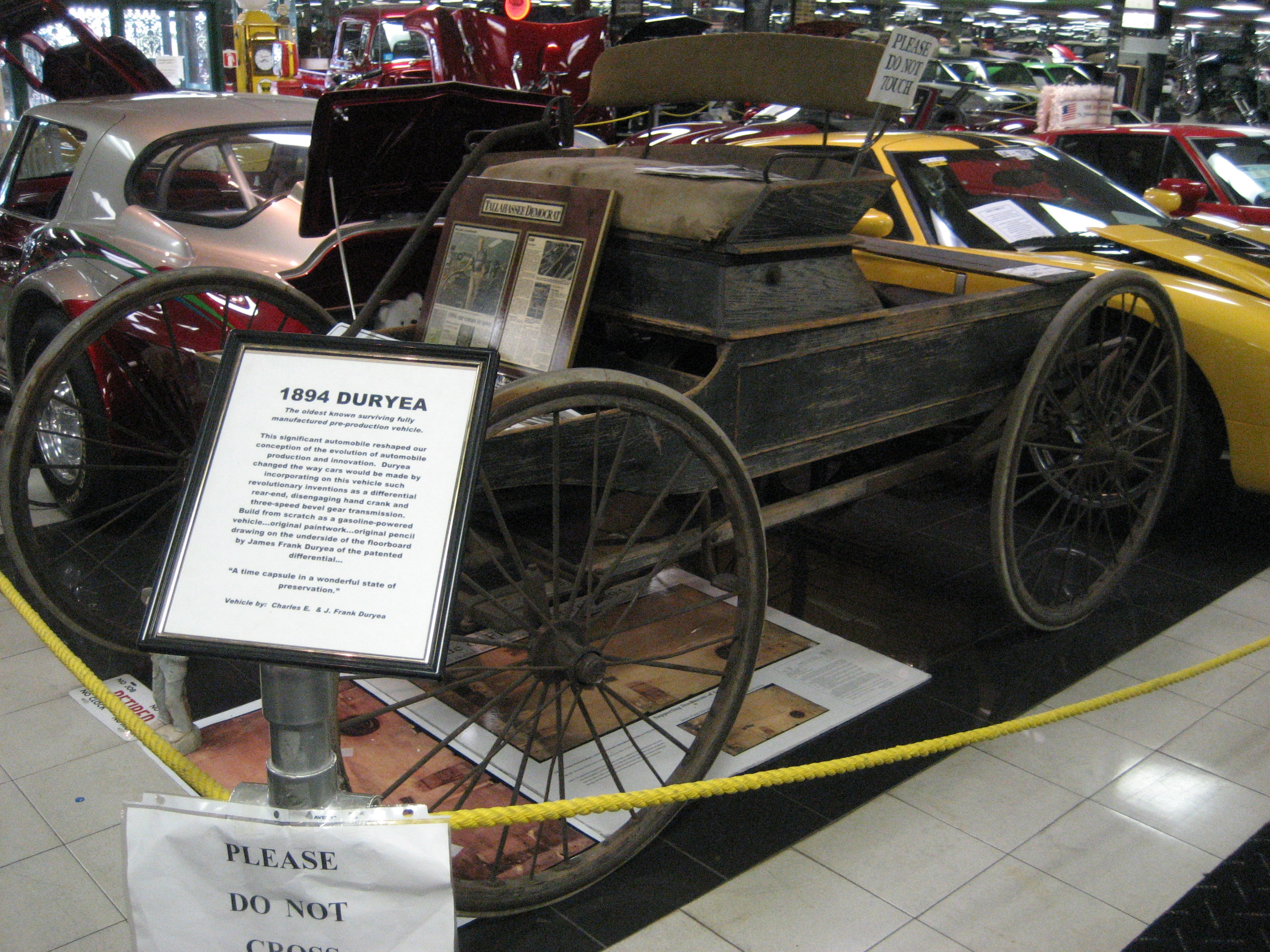
1894 Duryea Automobile at the Tallahassee Antique Car Museum

== Biography ==
Charles Duryea was born on December 15, 1861, near Canton, Illinois, to George Washington Duryea and Louisa Melvina Turner.

Duryea and his brother Frank (1869–1967) were initially bicycle makers in Washington, D.C., but later became world-renowned as the first American gasoline-powered car manufacturers, headquartered in Springfield, Massachusetts. Their design was inspired by a Benz gasoline-powered car that Charles saw at a fair in Ohio. Generally speaking, Charles engineered the automobiles, while Frank built, tested and raced them.

=== Tests of the Second American gasoline-powered automobile ===
On September 21, 1893, the Duryea brothers road-tested the second-ever American gasoline-powered automobile, after the Buckeye gasoline buggy invented in 1891 by John William Lambert. The Duryea's "motor wagon" was a used horse drawn buggy that the brothers had purchased for $70 and into which they had installed a 4 HP, single cylinder gasoline engine. The car (buggy) had a friction transmission, spray carburetor and low tension ignition. Frank Duryea test drove it again on November 10 — this time in a prominent location: past their garage at 47 Taylor Street in Springfield. The next day it was reported by The Republican newspaper with great fanfare.

This particular car was put into storage in 1894 and stayed there until 1920, when it was rescued by a former Duryea engineer Inglis M. Uppercu and presented to the United States National Museum.

=== The Duryea Motor Wagon Company ===
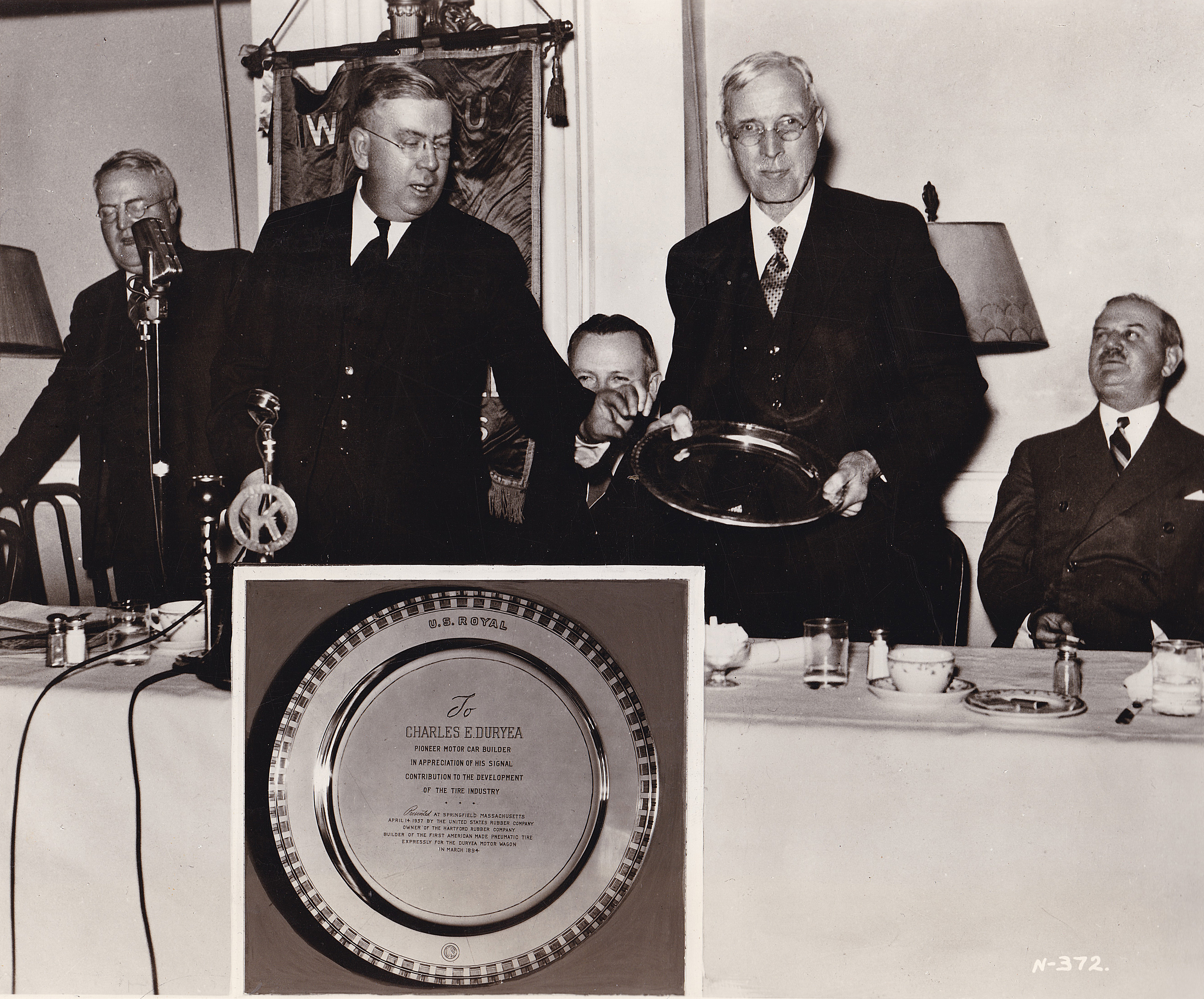
Mayor William P. Yoerg, of Holyoke (center-left), also a tire salesman and garage owner, presents an award to Charles Duryea for being the first to use pneumatic tires on an automobile, effectively starting the American automobile tire industry

On November 28, 1895, in Chicago, their vehicle, driven by brother Frank, had won America's first car race. It ran to Evanston, Illinois and back. The only other finisher was one of three Benz cars mostly made in Germany. After Frank won, demand grew for the Duryea Motor Wagon. In 1896, the Duryea Brothers produced 13 cars by hand – in their garage at 47 Taylor Street – and thus Duryea became the first-ever commercially produced vehicle, and also the largest automobile factory in the United States. For the history of the company and its cars, see Duryea Motor Wagon Company.

Duryea sought out investors and buyers while his brother, Frank Duryea, primarily handled the mechanical side of the business.

A Duryea car was involved in America's first known auto accident. New York City motorist Henry Wells hit a bicyclist with his new Duryea. The rider suffered a broken leg, Wells spent a night in jail and the nation's first traffic accident was recorded in March 1896. In 1913, George Vanderbilt purchased and drove a Stevens-Duryea, but was one of few people in the United States who could afford one. His 1913 Duryea is Vanderbilt's only original car kept at his Biltmore Estate.

Duryea ceased manufacturing in 1917.

Duryea died of a heart attack in Philadelphia on September 28, 1938, and was buried in Ivy Hill Cemetery, West Oak Lane.

== Legacy ==
Duryea was inducted into the Automotive Hall of Fame in 1973.

The annual Duryea Hillclimb is named in his honor.

The Charles Duryea Residence (located in Peoria's historic West Bluff district) was named a City of Peoria Historical Landmark in July 2015; automobiles were manufactured in a barn on the property, which is no longer standing. An automobile built in Duryea's barn in 1898 is on permanent display at the Peoria Riverfront Museum.

== See also ==
- Elwood Haynes, previously credited with the first American gasoline automobile by the Smithsonian Institution
