= Stevens-Duryea =

Defunct American motor vehicle manufacturer

J. Stevens Arms and Tool Company; Stevens-Duryea Company; Stevens-Duryea, Inc.
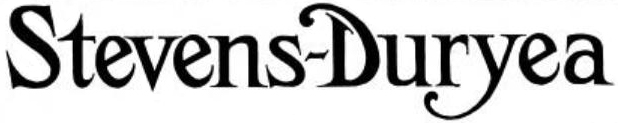
- Pioneer Builders of American Sixes, There Is No Better Motor Car

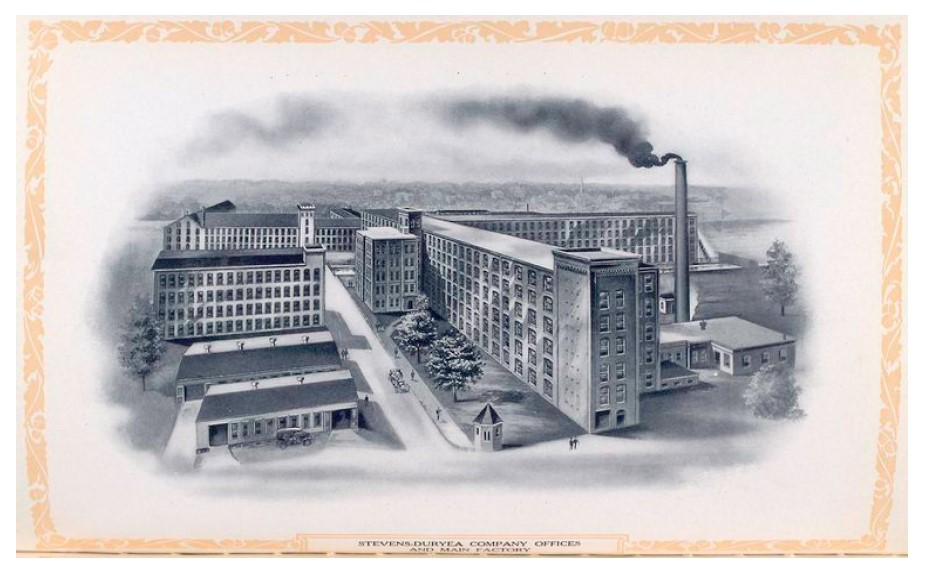
- 1909 Stevens-Duryea Company factory and offices
- Industry: Automotive
- Predecessor: Hampden Automobile and Launch Company
- Founded: 1901; 125 years ago
- Founder: J. Frank Duryea, Irving H. Page
- Defunct: 1927; 99 years ago
- Fate: Closed
- Headquarters: Chicopee, Massachusetts, United States
- Key people: J. Frank Duryea; William M. Remington; Irving H. Page; Walter H. Whiteside; Ray S. Deering; Ralph R. Owen
- Products: Automobiles
- Production output: 14,078 (1901–1927)

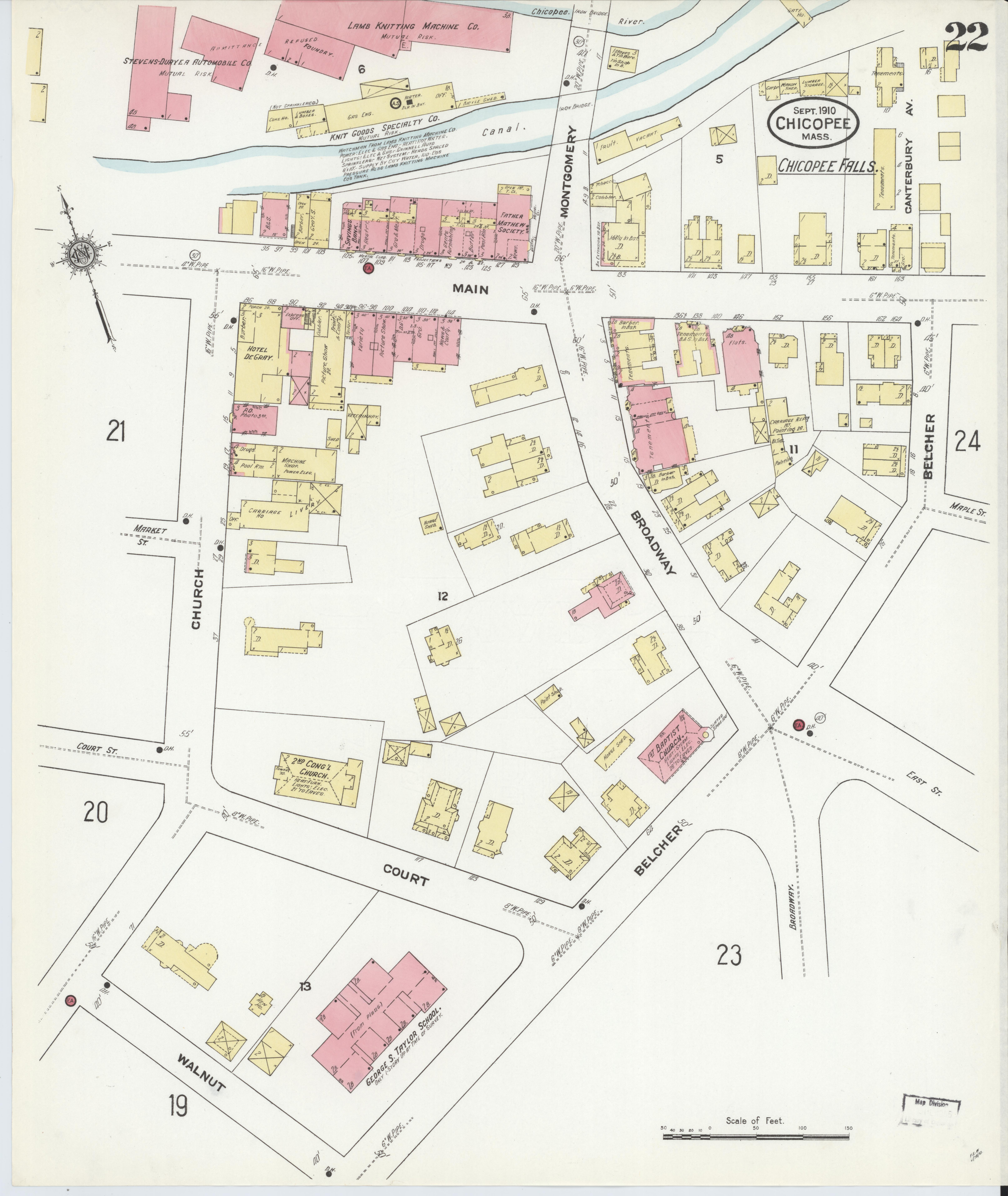
1910 Stevens-Duryea Plant

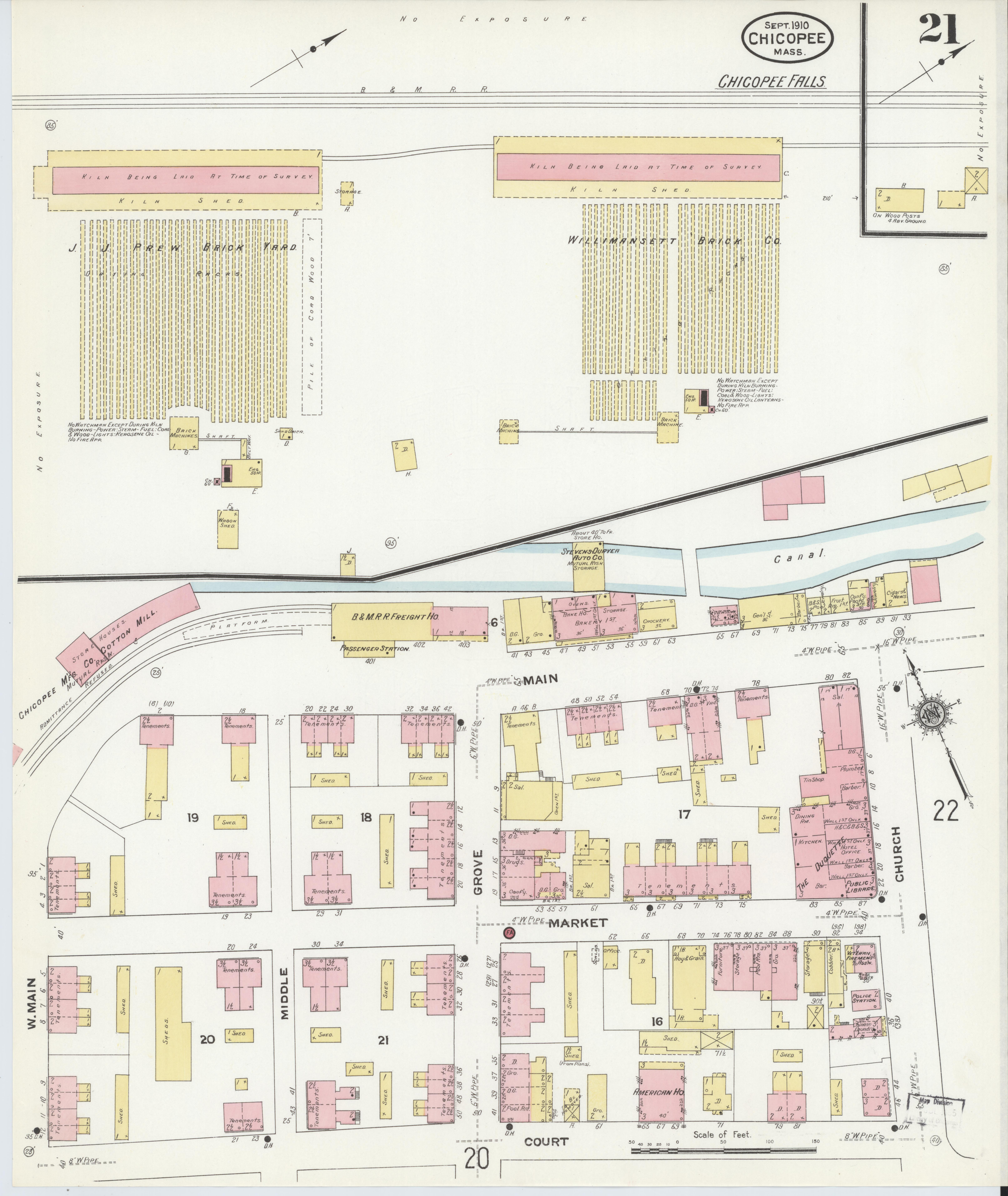
1910 Stevens-Duryea Plant

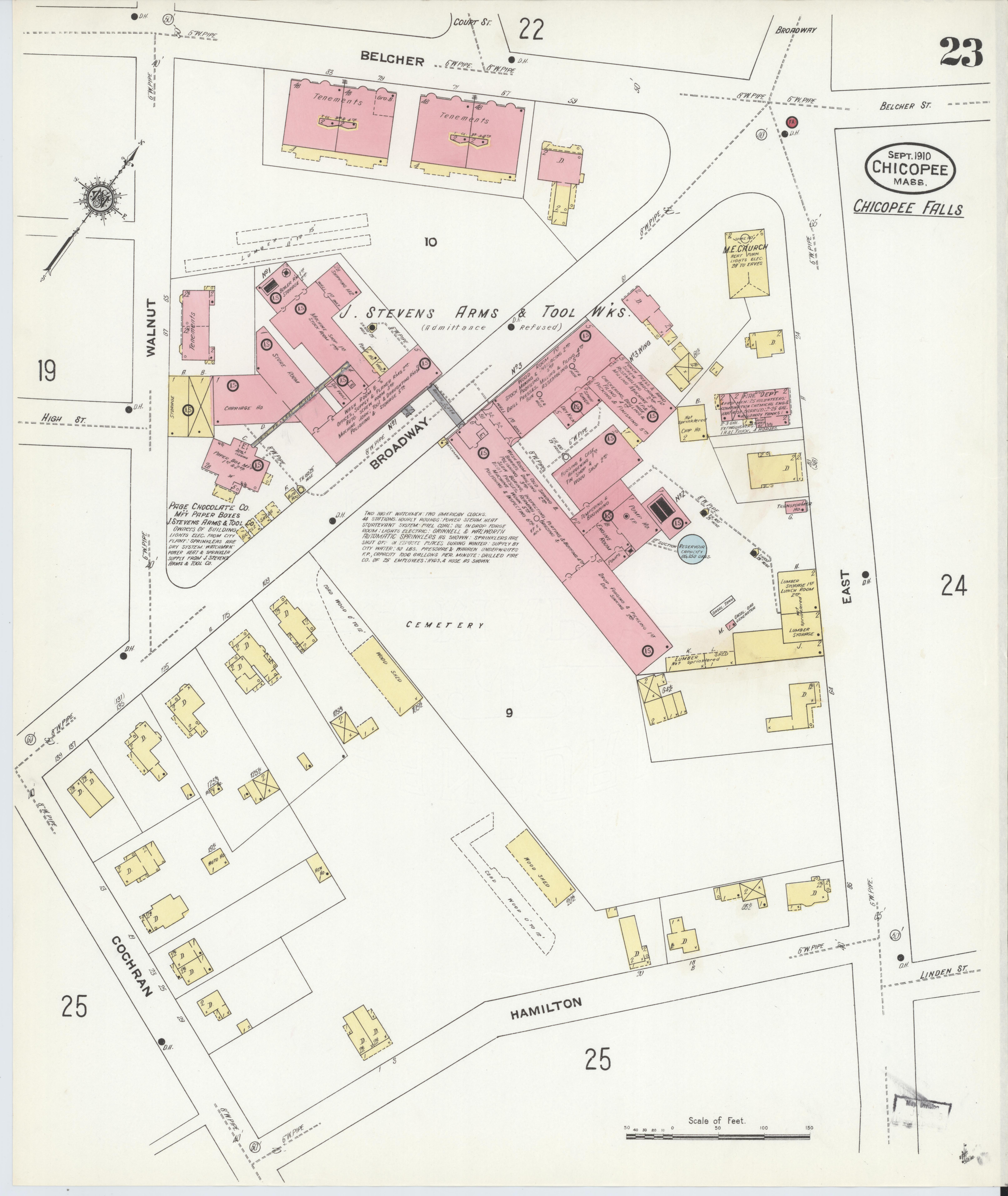
1910 Stevens-Duryea Partner Plant from Stevens Arms and Tool Company

Stevens-Duryea was an American manufacturer of Veteran and Brass Era automobiles in Chicopee Falls, Massachusetts, between 1901 and 1915 and Vintage Cars from 1919 to 1927.

The company was founded by J. Frank Duryea and J. Stevens Arms and Tool Company, in 1901 to build cars to Frank Duryea's design. First appearing as a two-cylinder runabout, the cars entered the luxury market with four-cylinder engines and pioneered the development of six-cylinder cars. Known for quality and craftsmanship, the company voluntarily closed in 1915 during a weak economic market. The rights and engineering for the Stevens-Duryea were acquired by a new company in 1919 and resumed car production on a limited scale until 1927.

== History ==
=== Hampden Automobile & Launch Company ===
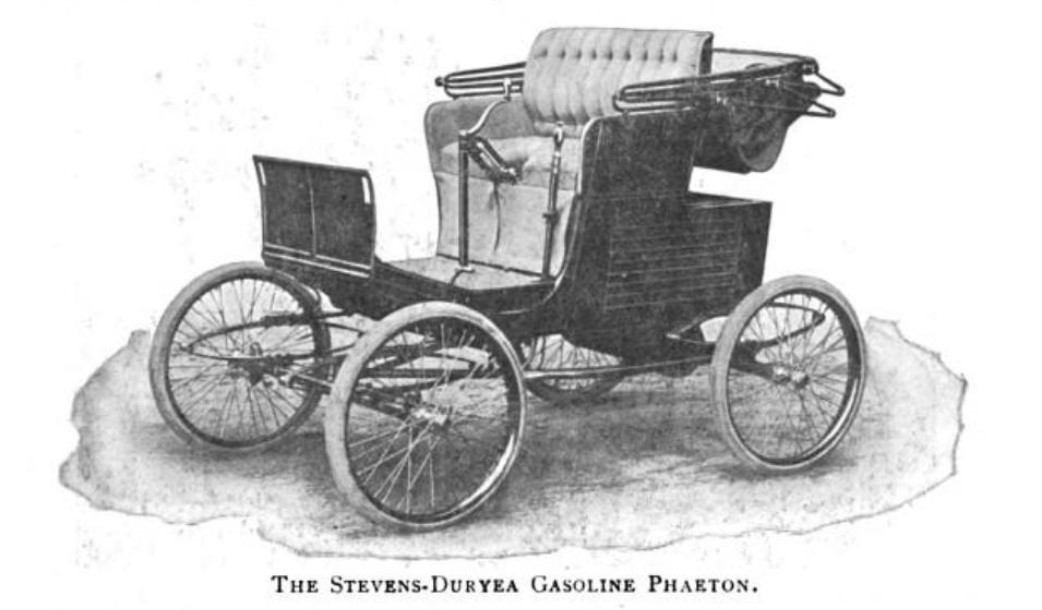
1901 Hampden Phaeton described as 1902 Stevens-Duryea in Automobile Topics

After departing from the Duryea Motor Wagon Company in July 1898, J. Frank Duryea was hired to build a car for the American Automobile Company of New York. When this company appeared to be more interested in stock promotion than building cars, Frank Duryea returned to Springfield (Hampden County) in 1900 and set-up an engineering company with his chief mechanic, John S. Jones and draughtsman William M. Remington. The Hampden Automobile & Launch Company built one launch and three prototype cars. Built in a small shop, the company looked for a partner to begin manufacturing and found J. Stevens Arms and Tool Company with spare manufacturing space and funds.

=== J. Stevens Arms and Tool Company ===
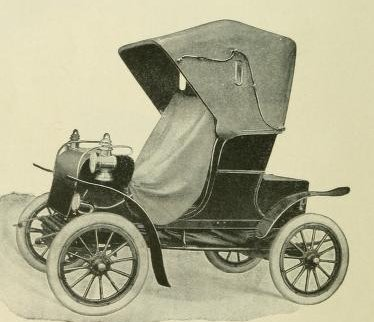
1904 Stevens-Duryea Model L Stanhope Runabout

A contract to manufacture cars called Stevens-Duryea was signed in August 1901. Stevens Arms had recently purchased the factory of Victor Steam and bicycle maker Overman, and Stevens-Duryea shared the premises for several months. The first Stevens-Duryea was identical to the car developed by Hampden Automobile & Launch and the first 50 cars were planned to be built by March 1902. The Stevens-Duryea was a two-cylinder, 5-hp runabout that sold for $1,200 in 1901 (equivalent to $46,400 in 2025).

The firm produced 61 cars in 1902 and 483 in 1903. By 1904 the stanhope runabout, was called the Model L. It had a flat-mounted water-cooled 7-hp engine, situated amidships of the car, four speed gearbox (three forward, one reverse), wire wheels, full-elliptic springs, and tiller steering. Weighing 1,300-lb (590-kg), it sold at $1,300. This would be imported to Britain by Joseph Baker and Sons. Stevens-Duryea would participate in Reliability Trials, hill climbs and some motorsports, and joined A.L.A.M. and participated in the major motor shows.

In 1905 the Model R was introduced, a newly developed 4-cylinder engine of 20-hp, with three-speed gearbox and shaft drive. Briefly advertised as the Twentieth Century Hustler, with an aluminum-bodied, five-seat touring car, priced at $2,500 (equivalent to $89,583 in 2025), Stevens-Duryea enter the luxury car market where they would remain. Frank Duryea developed a multi-disc clutch and built his transmission in-unit with the motor. Using 3-point support for the unit engine and transmission, would be advertised for all future models.

=== Stevens-Duryea Company ===
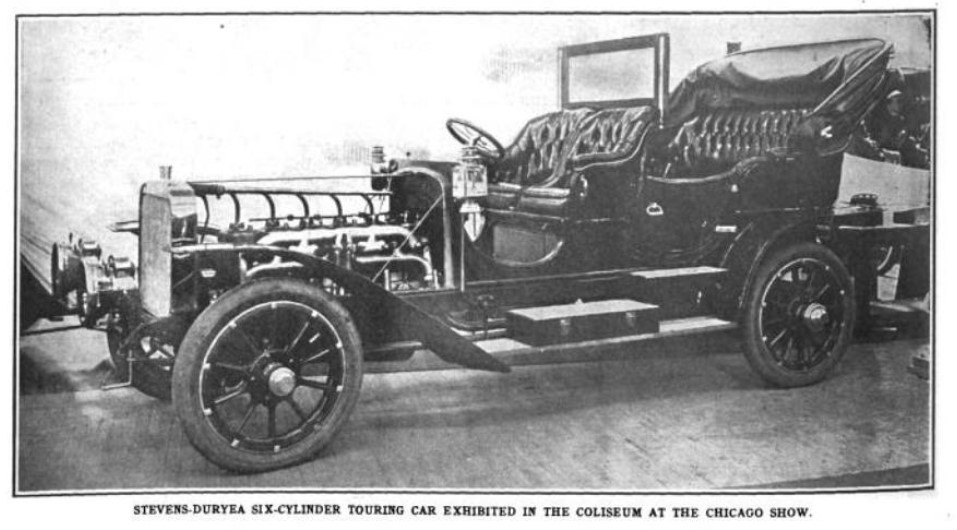
1906 Stevens-Duryea Model S Big Six at the Chicago Show

The model line grew in 1906, adding a $2,400 runabout and a $3,300 limousine. Stevens-Duryea automobile income was now larger than arms production income and J. Stevens Arms and Tool agreed to set-up a new company. Capitalized at $300,000, 3,000 shares were split 2/3 to J. Stevens Arms and Tool and 1/3 to J. Frank Duryea. Irving H. Page of Stevens Arms became President and Treasurer and Frank Duryea, Vice-President and Engineer.

For 1906 the new Model S Big Six was introduced with a huge 9.6 liter six-cylinder motor, seven-seat tulipwood and aluminum body, weighing 2,900-lbs (1315-kg) and priced at $5,000, equivalent to $179,167 in 2025. Introduced at the January 1906 New York Motor Show, it along with Franklin, was one of two six-cylinder American cars shown. National and Frayer-Miller also introduced six-cylinder cars in 1906. Dating their six-cylinder car from 1905 when it was tested, Stevens-Duryea would advertise their cars as the Pioneer Builder of American Sixes.

In 1907, the company dropped the Model L and added the Model U, a six-cylinder (Little Six) of 30/35-hp and priced more competitively at $3,500, equivalent to $120,937 in 2025. The Model U became very popular selling into 1910 when it was replaced with the Model AA (Light Six). The Model R was offered until a new four-cylinder, the 1909 Model X and Model XXX runabout was introduced. The model X was rated at 24-hp with prices starting at $2,750.

By 1910, a Model Y 6-40 six-cylinder vehicle replaced the Model S as the largest car. Horsepower ratings changed and the reported horsepower became 54.1. The Model Y formed the basis of Machinery's Reference Guide No. 60 Construction and Manufacture of Automobiles. Remarks in the publication emphasize how the company reached this configuration in the preceding six years.

In 1909 Frank Duryea at the age of 40, on doctor's advice, retired from daily work with Stevens-Duryea due to 20 years over-work and job related stress. Will Remington became chief engineer with Frank Duryea consulting. In July 1911, Walter H. Whiteside, formerly of Allis-Chalmers was elected President and I. H. Page became Chairman of the Board.

In 1913, Stevens-Duryea introduced the Model C-Six on two wheelbases and standardized on a one model policy. The C-Six engine was rated at 44.6-hp and was priced at $4,500 as a touring car, ranging up to $5,950 (equivalent to $193,826 in 2025) as a 7 passenger Berline. Production dropped from 1,500 cars in 1912 to 1,000 in 1913, but was more profitable for the company. The company advertising were extolling Nearly a Quarter-Century of Leadership.

The 1915 Model D was the company's last new design, an 80-hp (60 kW) 472ci (7740cc) six-cylinder. In January 1915 it was announced that Stevens-Duryea would stop making cars. Although financially strong, working cash was short and the uncertain financial market were sited as reasons. J. Frank Duryea was now the majority shareholder and turned down financial investments that were conditional on adding a lower priced line of cars. He did not feel Chicopee was a good location for volume production and was not interested in lowering his manufacturing standards. In May 1915 the majority of Stevens Arms and Stevens-Duryea plants was sold to New England Westinghouse Company. One building portion of the plant was retained to supply and make parts for the estimated 14,000 Stevens-Duryeas built.

== Stevens-Duryea, Inc. ==
In July 1919, Ray S. Deering, engineer Thomas L. Cowles and former employees purchased the small factory building, name and goodwill of Stevens-Duryea from Frank Duryea for $100,000. Stevens-Duryea, Incorporated was set-up and construction of a new plant was started. 1920 saw production restarted of the Model D as the Model E with some improvements, post-war inflationary priced at $8,000 for a touring car and up to $9,500 (equivalent to $152,679 in 2025) for a limousine. Extensive advertising, hiring of well-known engineers, building a new plant and announcement of plans did not result in many cars being produced. The company entered receivership in 1922 with assets estimated at $2,000,000. Over $4,800,000 of stock had been sold with the Delaware incorporation. The court estimated approximately 152 cars had been sold before receivership.

The company's liabilities were purchased by Ray Owen (of Owen Magnetic) in 1923 and Stevens-Duryea Motors, Inc. was formed. The new factory was sold to satisfy creditors and Stevens-Duryea production moved to the nearby Rauch and Lang factory owned by Owen. A new model Stevens-Duryea was announced, the Model G that was basically the same as the Model E. After only 28 cars were sold in 1924, manufacture of the Model G continued on an as orders received basis until production ended in 1927.

== Model overview ==
Model Gallery

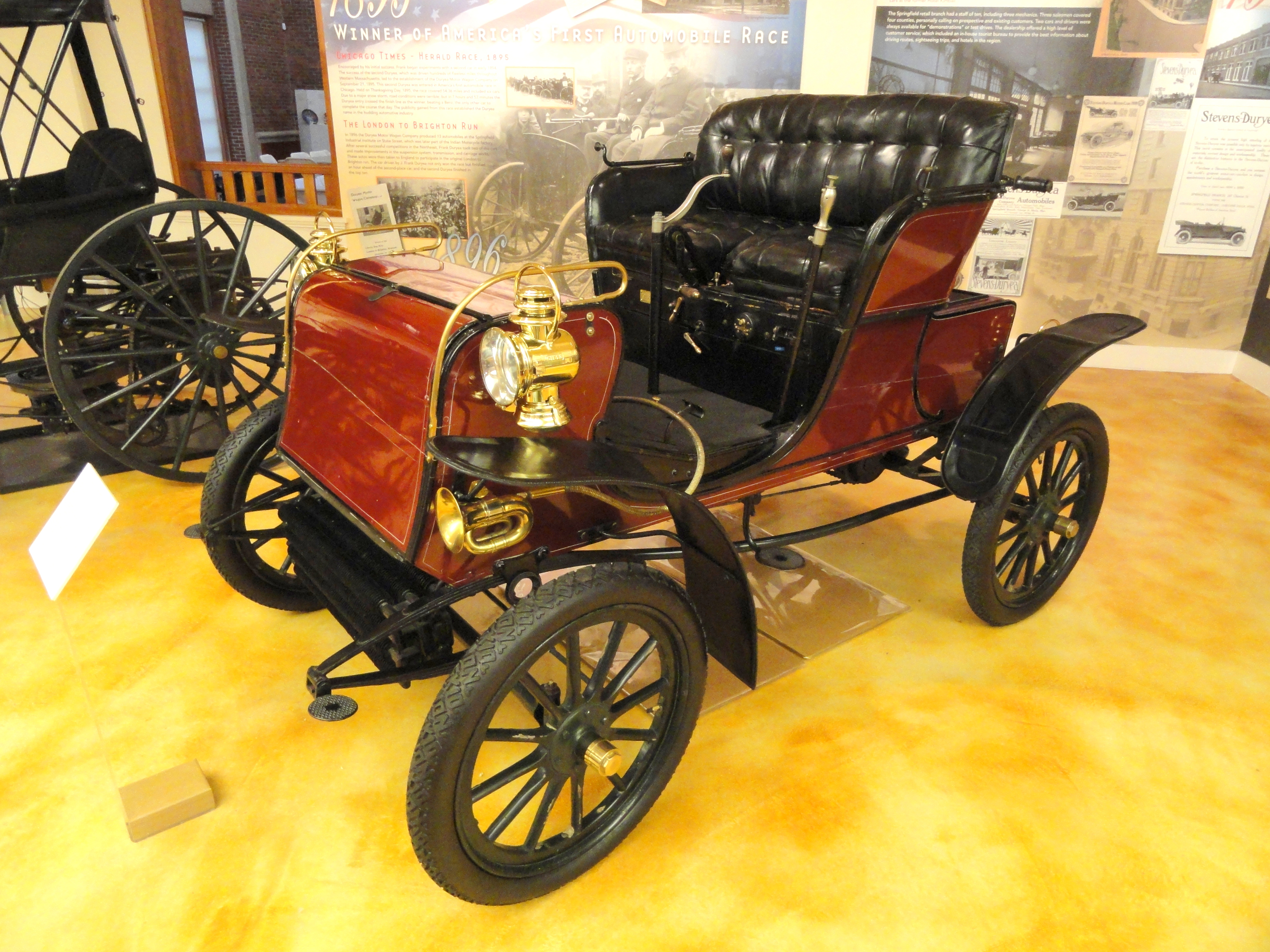
1903 Stevens-Duryea (Model L) Stanhope

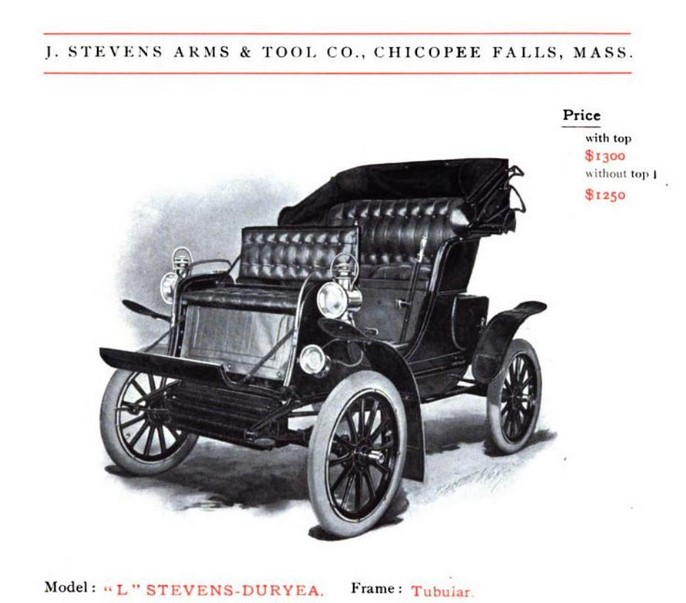
1904 Stevens-Duryea Model L Stanhope

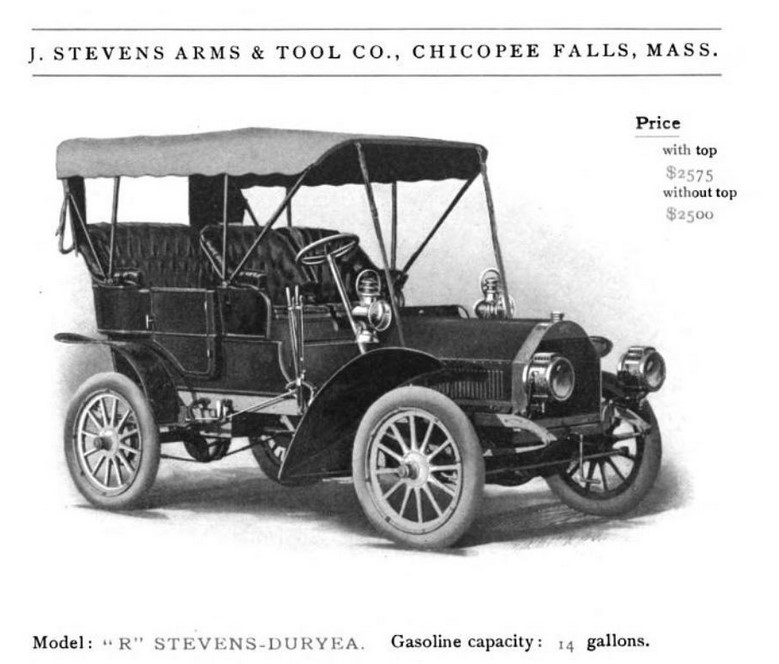
1905 Stevens-Duryea Model R Touring Car

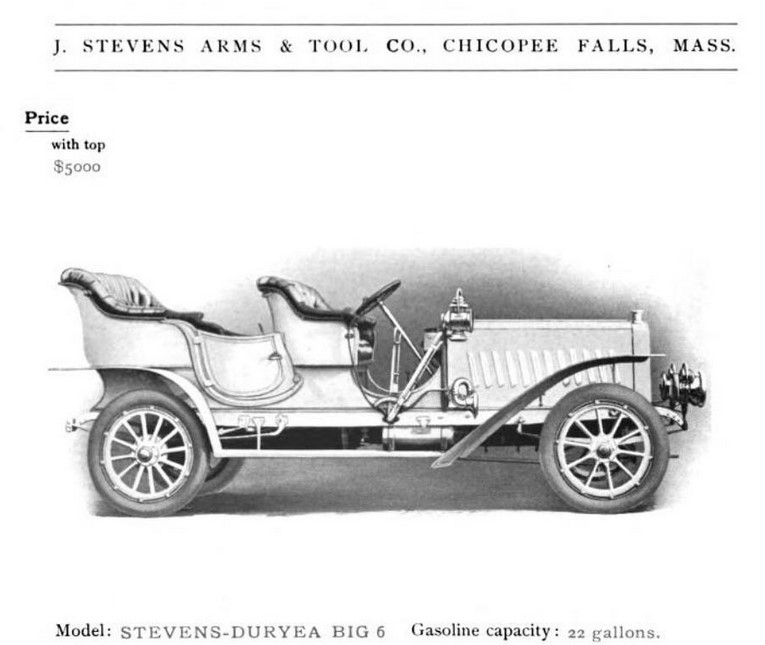
1906 Stevens-Duryea Model S Big Six Touring Car

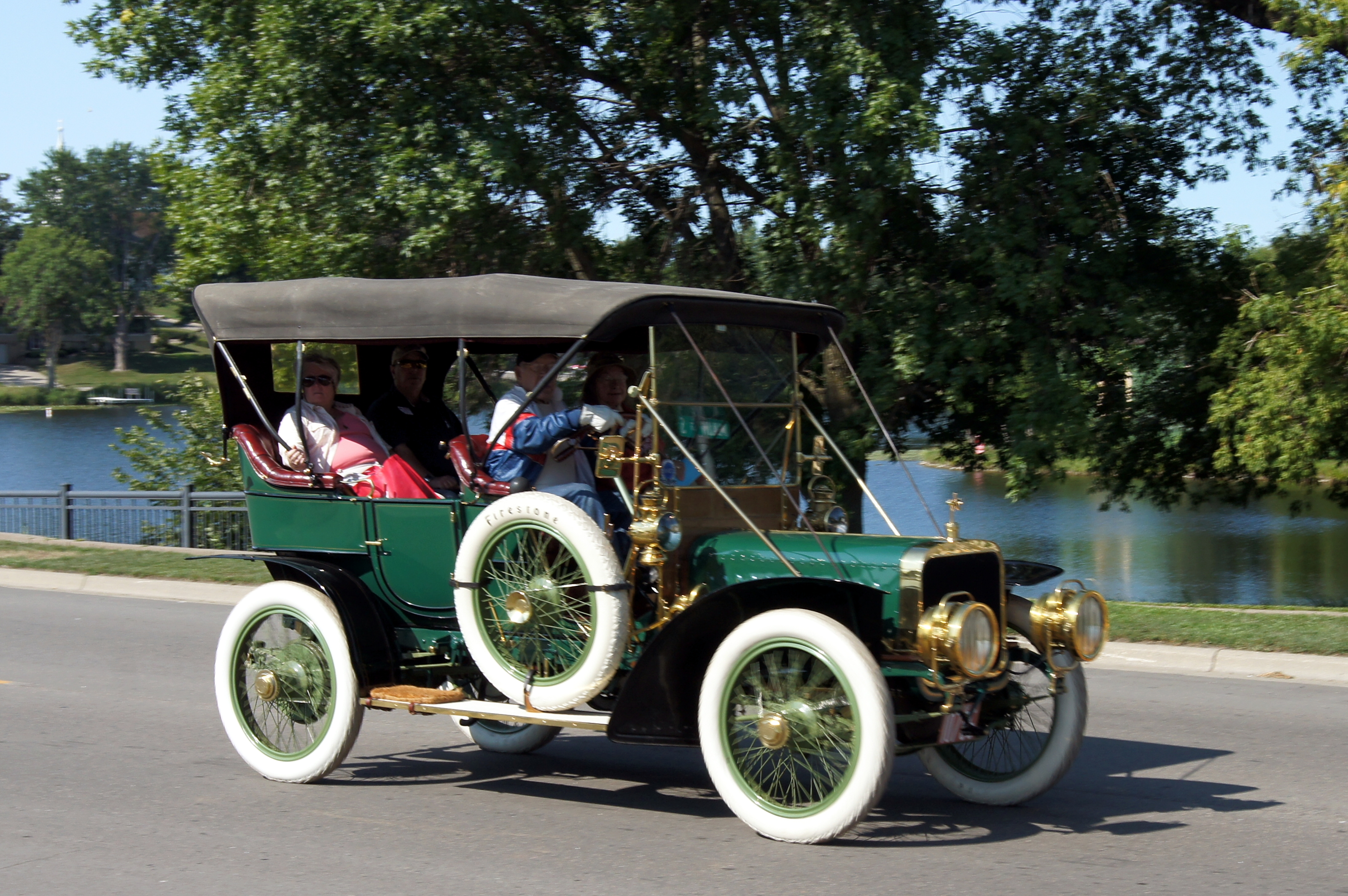
1907 Stevens-Duryea Model U Touring Car

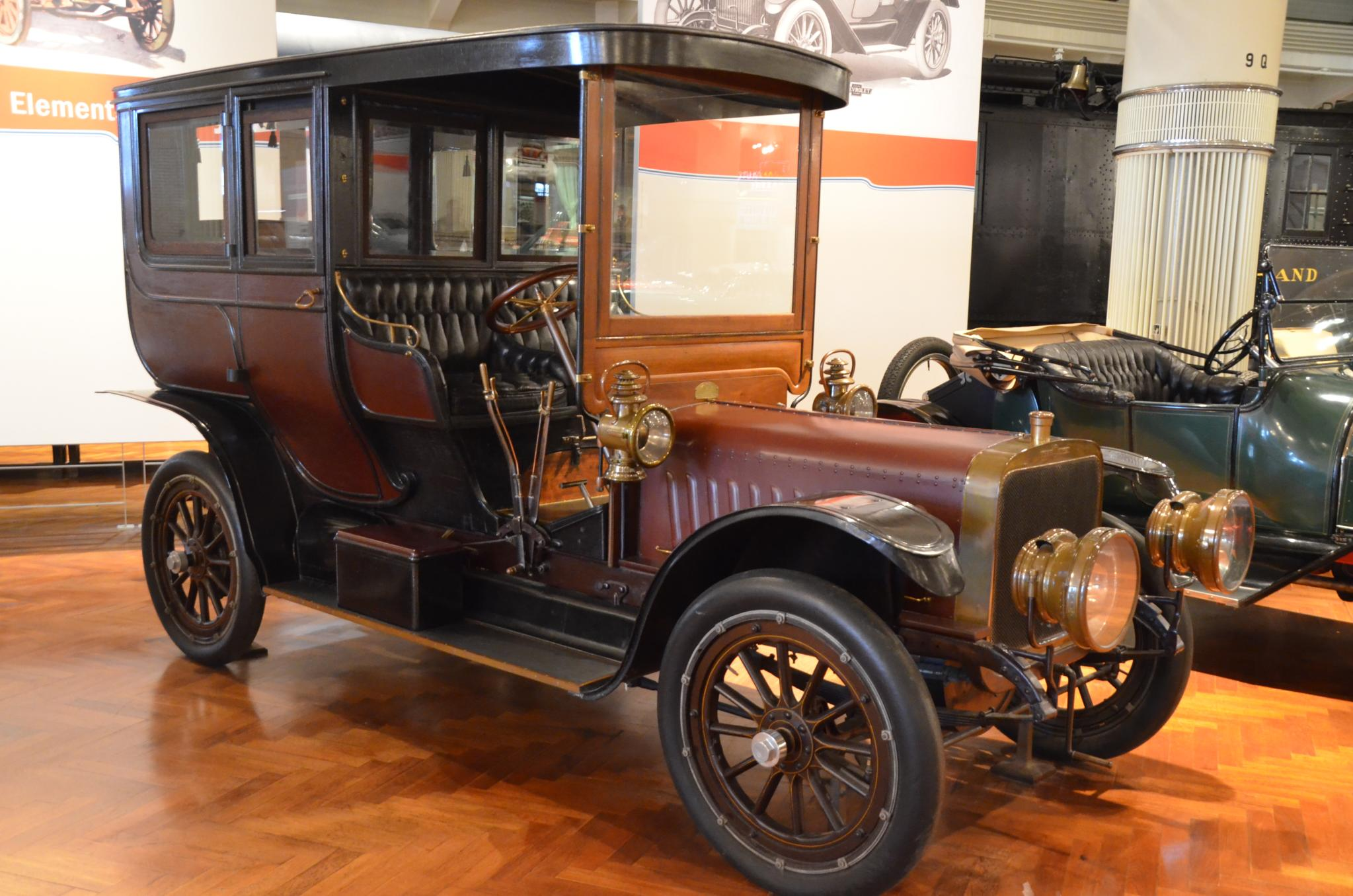
1908 Stevens-Duryea Model U Limousine

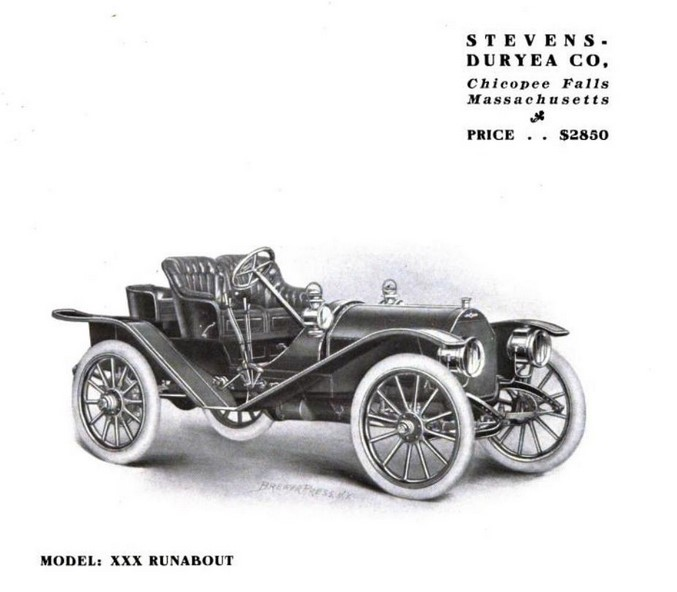
1909 Stevens-Duryea Model XXX Runabout

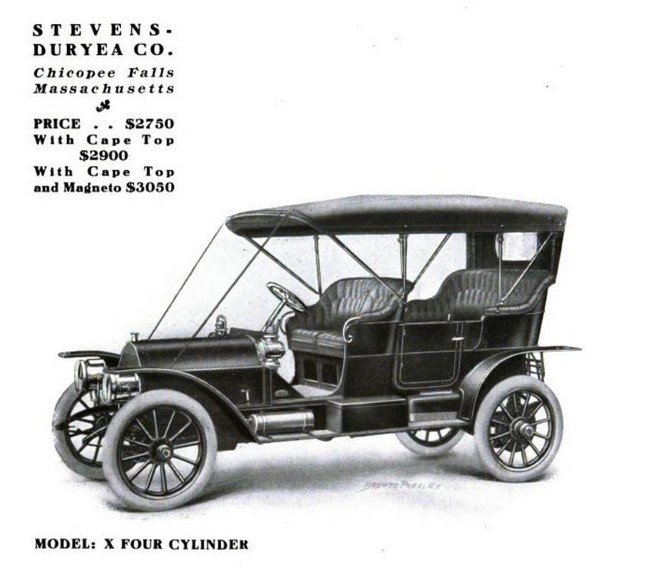
1909 Stevens-Duryea Model X Touring Car

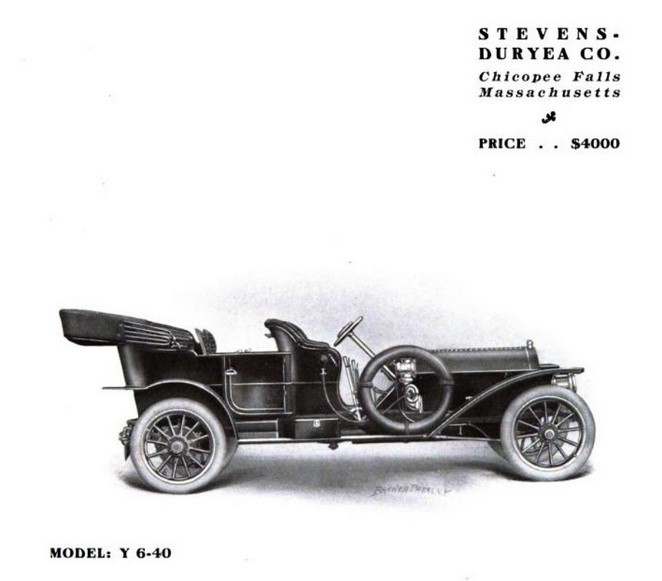
1909 Stevens-Duryea Model Y 6-40 Touring Car

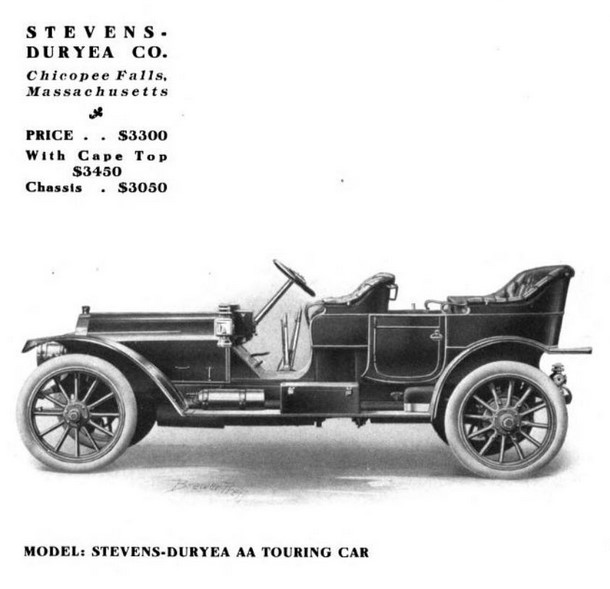
1910 Stevens-Duryea Model AA Touring Car

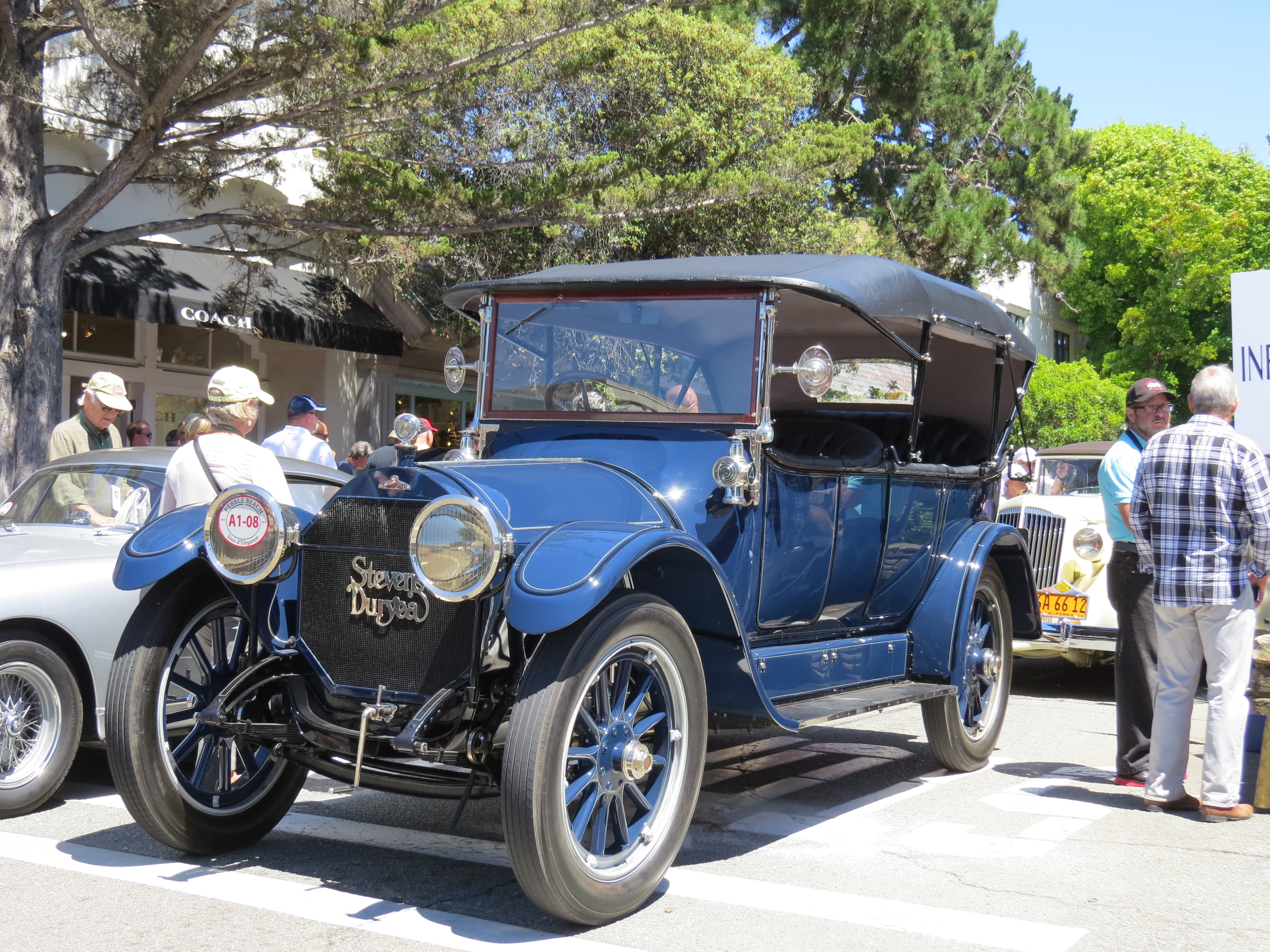
1913 Stevens-Duryea Model C-Six Touring Car

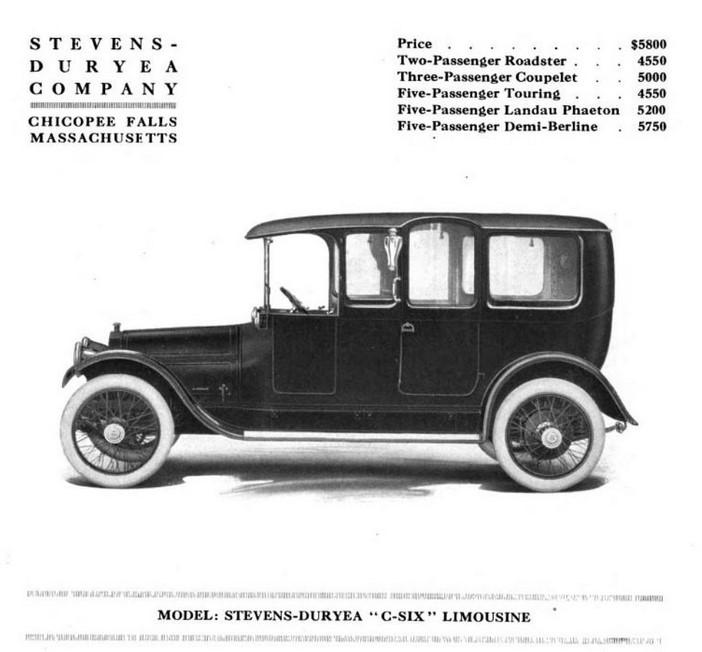
1914 Stevens-Duryea Model C-Six Limousine

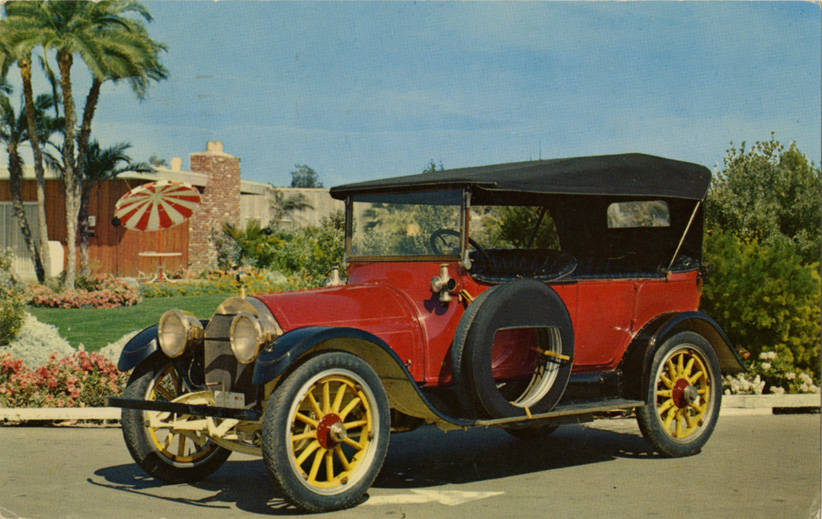
1915 Stevens-Duryea Model D-Six Touring Car

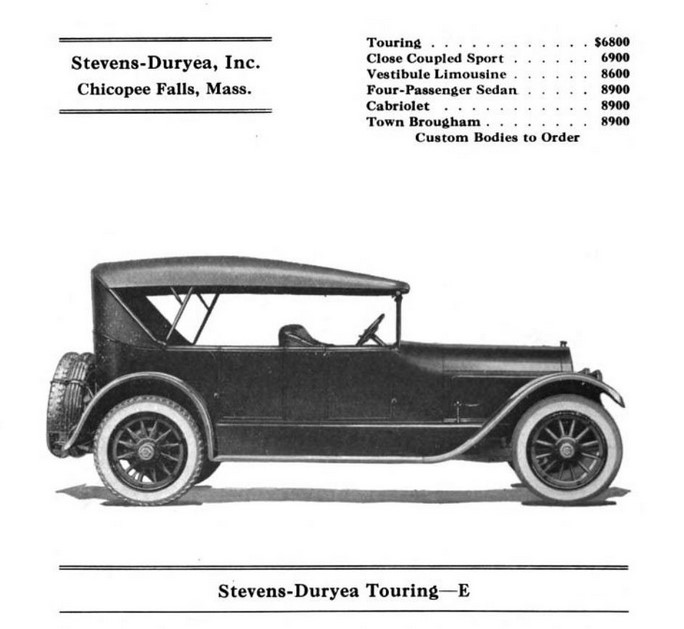
1922 Stevens-Duryea Model E Touring Car

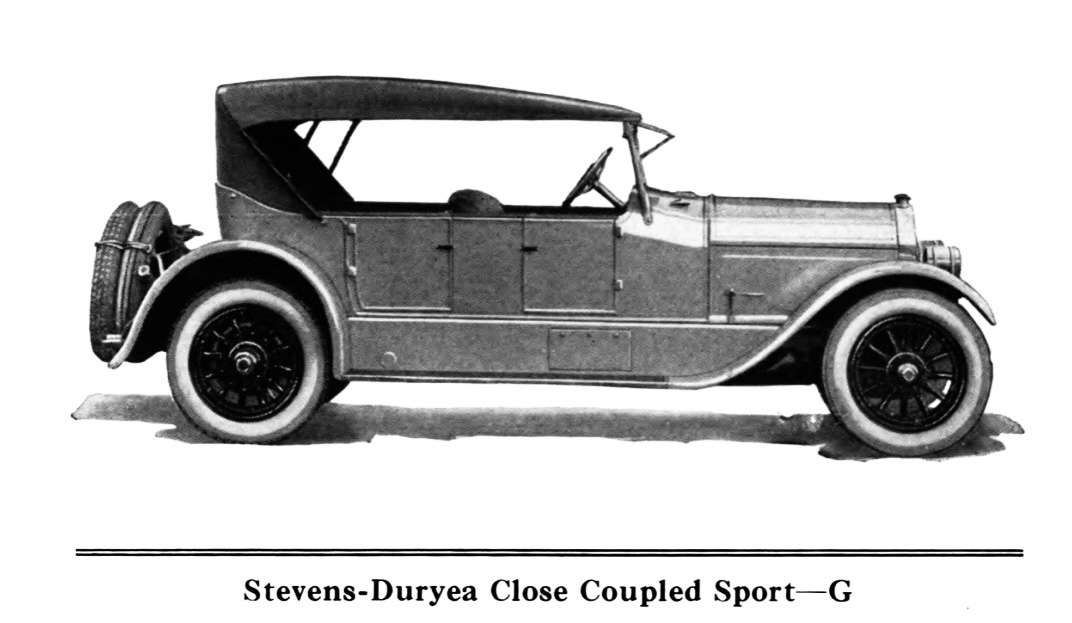
1922 Stevens-Duryea Model G Close Coupled Sport

Year	Model	Cylinder	Power ( hp )	Wheelbase (in/cm)	Body Styles
1901-1903	5 HP	2	5	69/175	Runabout 2-seater and 4-seater
1904-1906	Model L	2	7	69/175	Runabout 2-seater and 4-seater
1905-1909	Model R	4	20	90/229	Touring car 5-seater, Limousine 5-seater
1906-1909	Model S Big Six	6	50	122/310	Touring car 7-seater
1907-1909	Model U Little Six	6	30/35	114/290	Touring car 5-seater, sedan 5-seater
1909-1912	Model X	4	36.1	124/315	Touring car 5-seater, sedan 7-seater, roadster, fore-door touring car
1909-1910	Model XXX	4	24/36.1	109/277	3-seater runabout, 4-seater baby tonneau
1909-1912	Model Y	6	40/54.1	142/363	Touring Car 7 Seater, Fore-Door Touring Car, Sedan
1910-1912	Model AA	6	43/43.8	128/325	5-seater and 7-seater touring car, 5-seater torpedo, 7-seater limousine, 7-seater landaulet, 4-seater roadster, 2-seater runabout
1913-1914	Model C Six	6	44.6/44.8	131/333 138/351	Touring car 5-seater, Roadster, Coupelet 2-seater, Convertible Phaeton 5-seater, Demi-Berline 5-seater, Limousine 7-seater, Landau Phaeton 5-seater
1915	Model D Six	6	46	131/333	7-seater sedan, 5-seater touring car, 3-seater roadster, 5-seater Landau Phaeton, Demi-Berline
1915	Model DD Six	6	47.2	138/351	7-seater touring car, 7-seater Landau Phaeton, 7-seater sedan, 7-seater landaulet
1920-1923	Model E	6	80	138/351	4 Seater & 7 Seater Touring Car, 7 Seater Vestibule Sedan, 7 Seater Three-Quarter Sedan, 4 Seater Sedan, Close-Coupled Sport Touring Car, Convertible, Town Brougham, Roadster, Coupe
1924-1927	Model G	6	80	138/351	7-seater touring car, 4-seater sports touring car, 2-seater roadster, 4-seater coupe, 4-seater and 6-seater sedan, 6-seater and 7-seater vestibule sedan, open drive sedan, Town Brougham, convertible

== Production ==
A total of over 14,000 passenger cars were built.

Year	Number	Model
1901		5 HP
1902	61	5 HP
1903	483	5 HP; Model L
1904	600	Model L
1905	600	Model L; Model R
1906	739	Model L; Model R; Model U
1907	1,000	Model R; Model U
1908	1,500	Model R; Model X; Model U
1909	1,500	Model R; Model X; Model XXX; Model U
1910	1,500	Model X; Model XXX; Model AA
1911	1,500	Model X; Model AA
1912	1,500	Model X; Model AA
1913	1,000	C Six
1914	1,000	C Six
1915	573	D Six
1920	204	Model E
1921	136	Model E
1922	63	Model E
1923	66	Model E
1924	28	Model G
1925	16	Model G
1926	8	Model G
1927	1	Model G
total	14,078	

== Advertisements ==
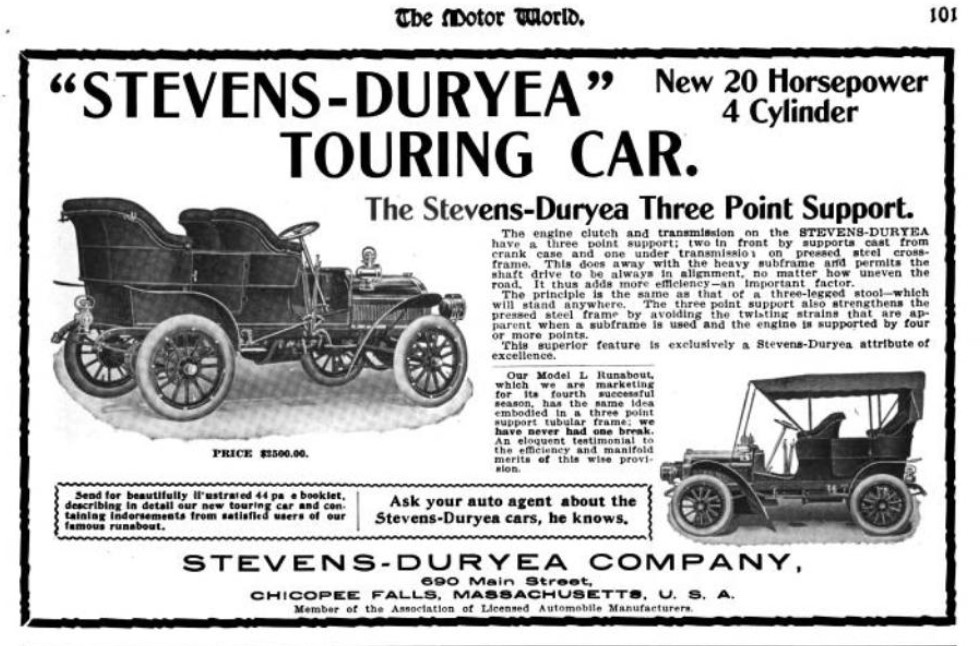
1905 Stevens-Duryea advertisement in Motor World

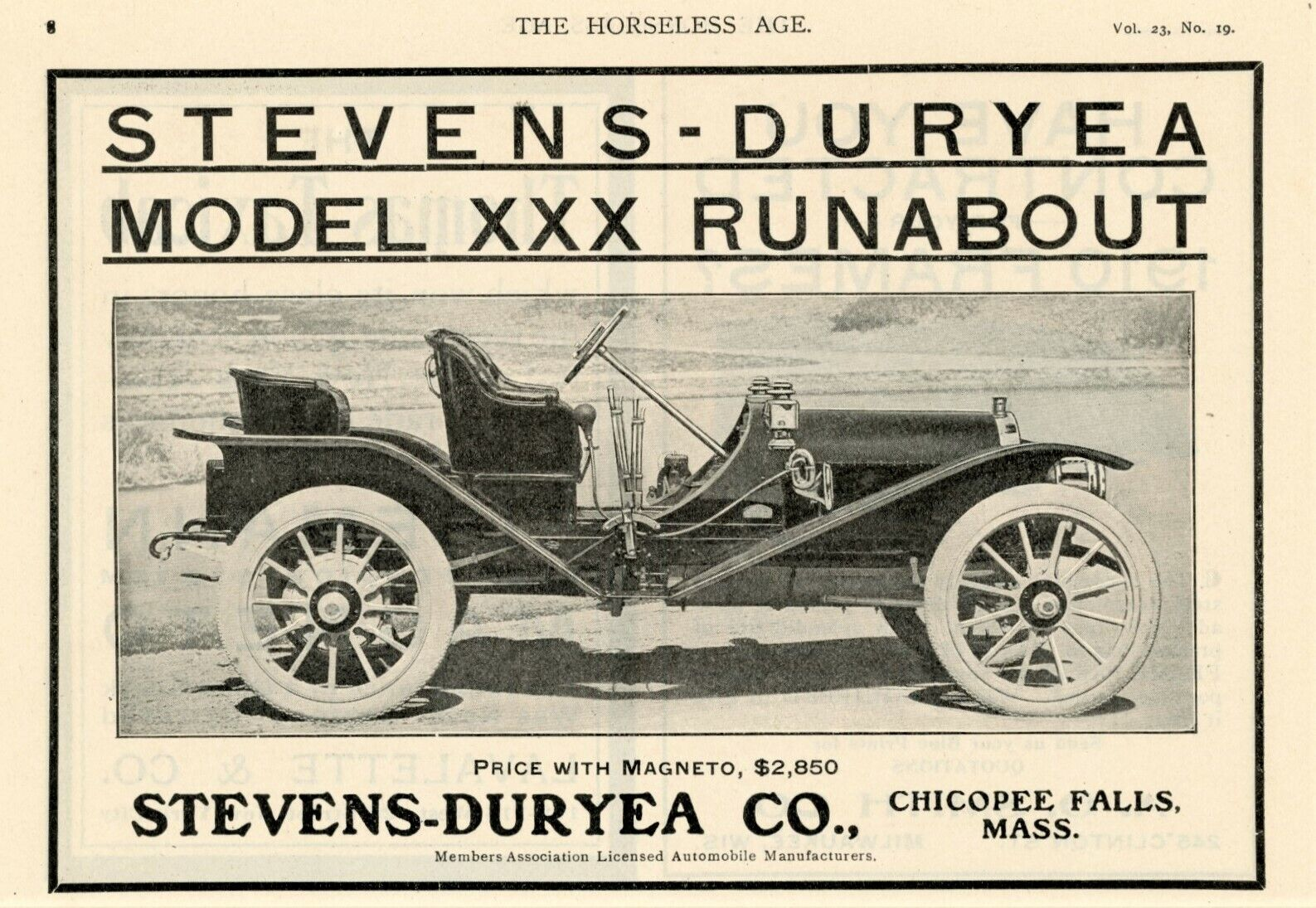
1909 Stevens-Duryea Model XXX in Horseless Age

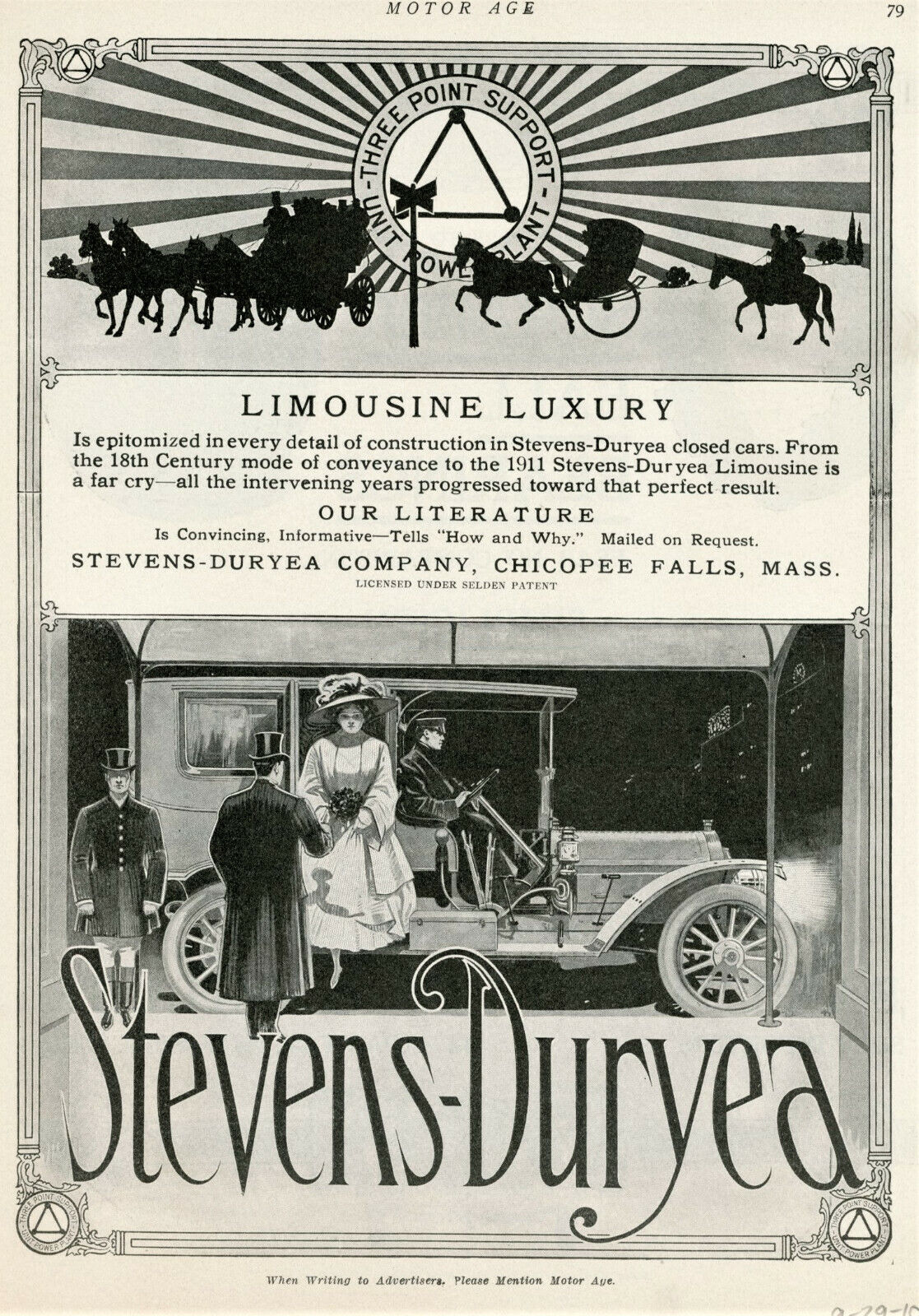
1910 Stevens-Duryea advertisement in Motor Age

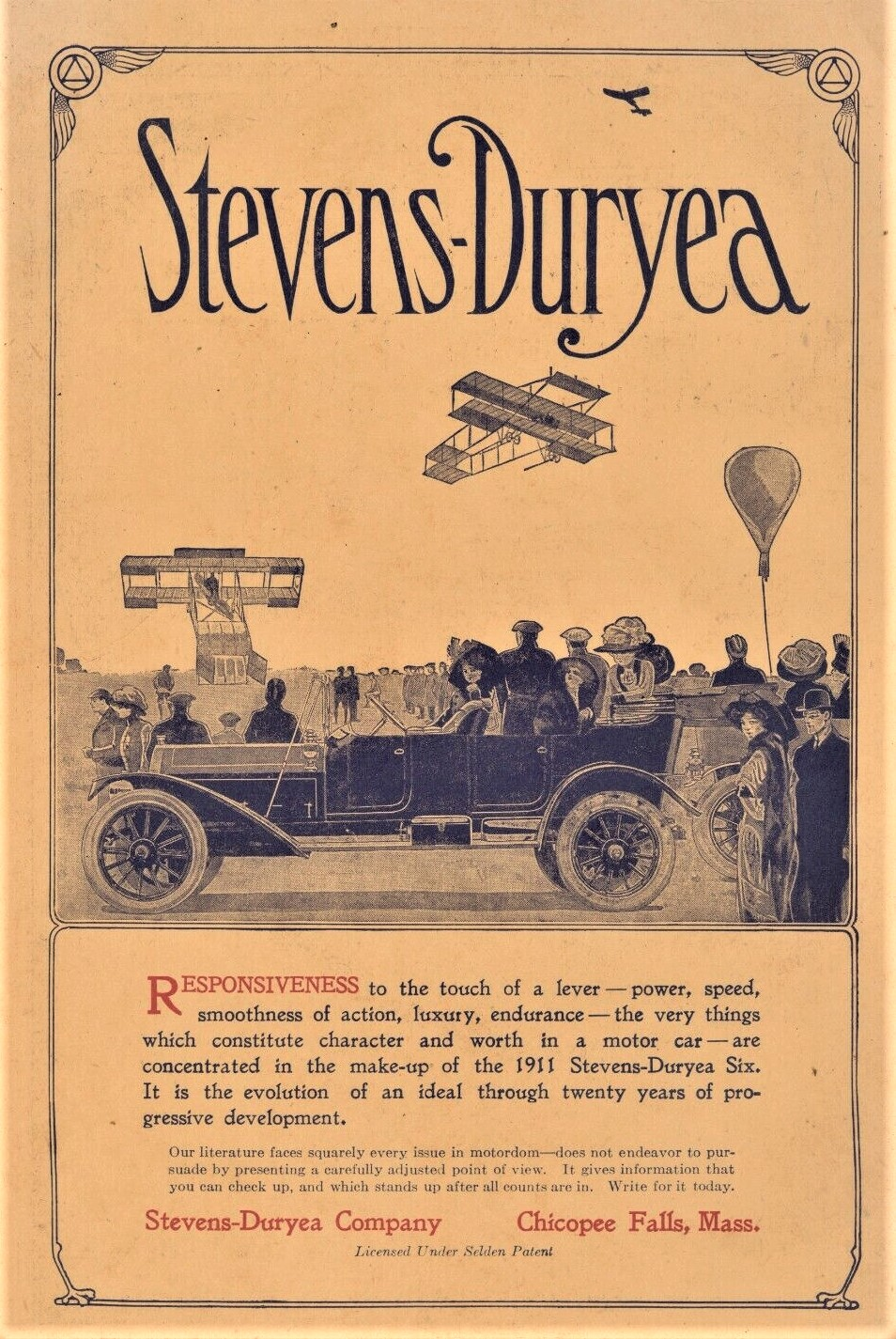
1911 Stevens-Duryea advertisement back cover of Cycle and Automobile Trade Journal

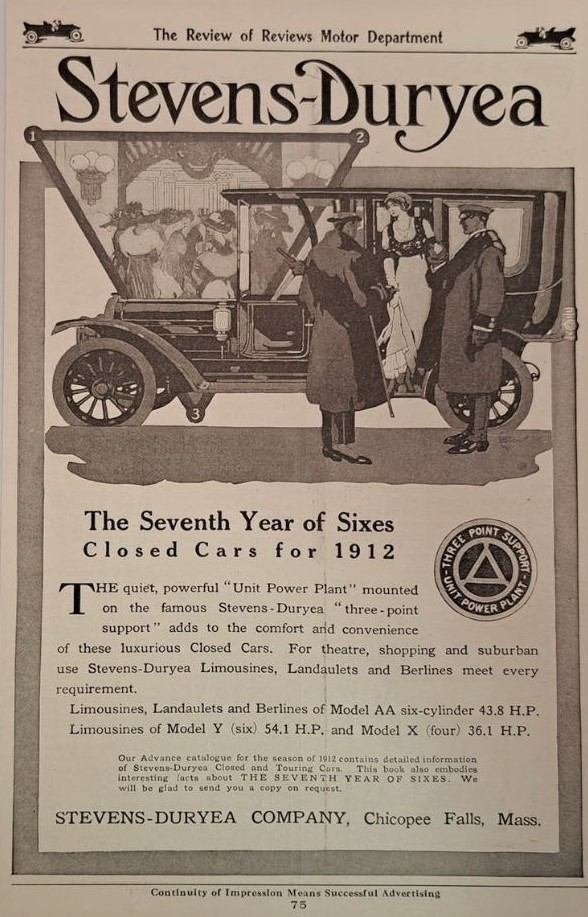
1912 Stevens-Duryea advertisement in Review of Reviews

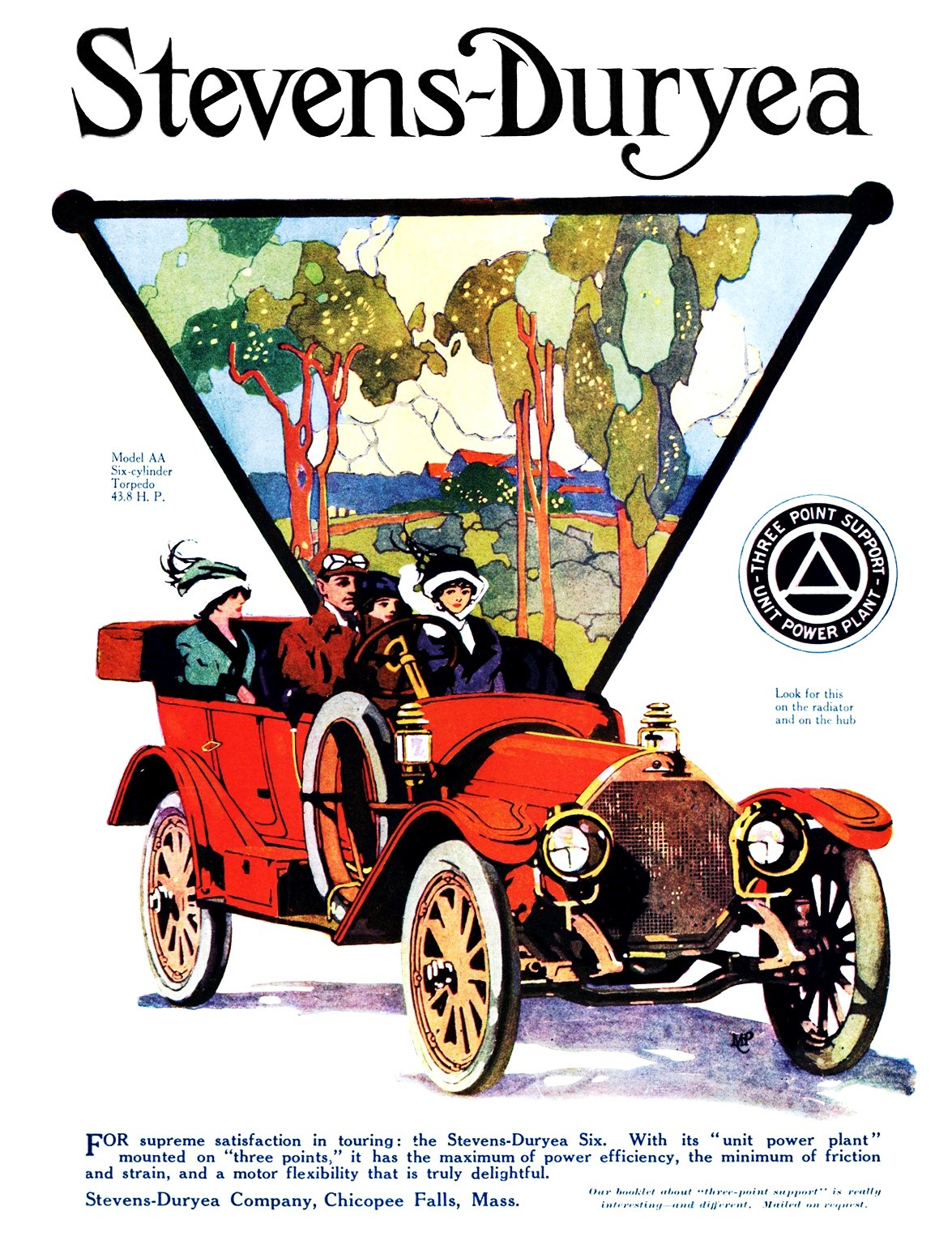
1913 Stevens-Duryea advertisement in The Outing magazine

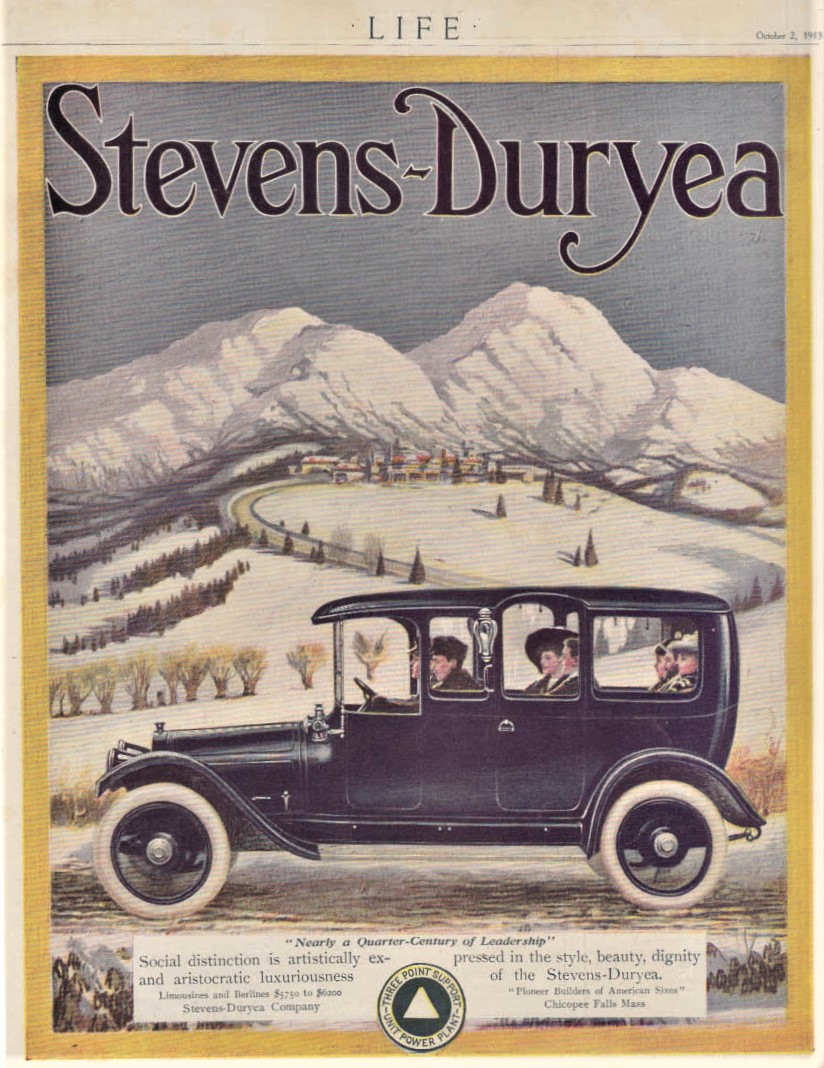
1914 Steven-Duryea advertisement in Life magazine

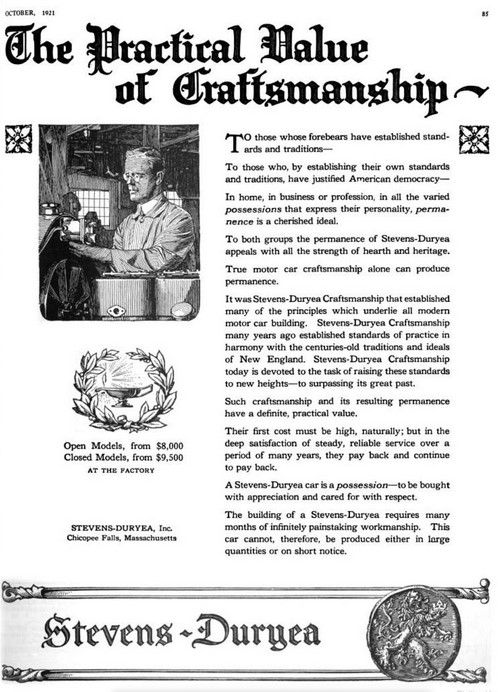
1921 Stevens-Duryea advertisement in Vanity Fair

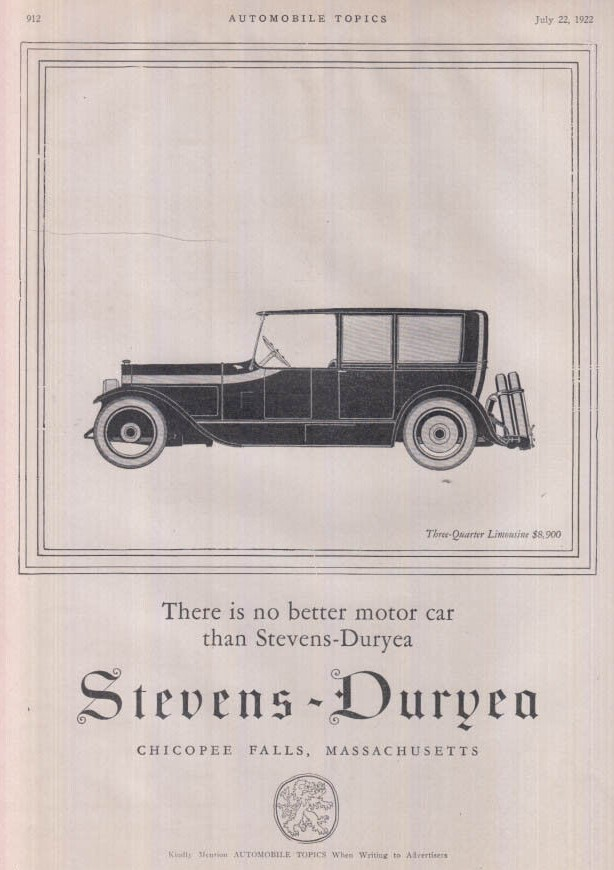
1922 Stevens-Duryea advertisement Automobile Topics

== See also ==
- Alesbury, an Irish automobile powered by a Stevens-Duryea engine.

== Additional reading ==
- Wise, David Burgess. "Stevens-Duryea: A Very Limited Company", in Ward, Ian, executive editor. World of Automobiles (London: Orbis Publishing), Volume 19, p. 2188-9.
