= Duryea Motor Wagon Company =

Defunct American automobile manufacturer

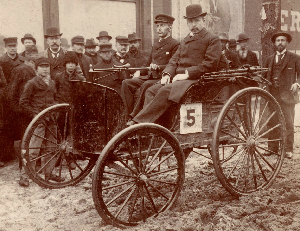
- Duryea automobile
- Founded: 1895; 131 years ago
- Founders: Charles Duryea; J. Frank Duryea
- Defunct: 1914; 112 years ago
- Headquarters: Springfield, Massachusetts, USA
- Products: Automobiles

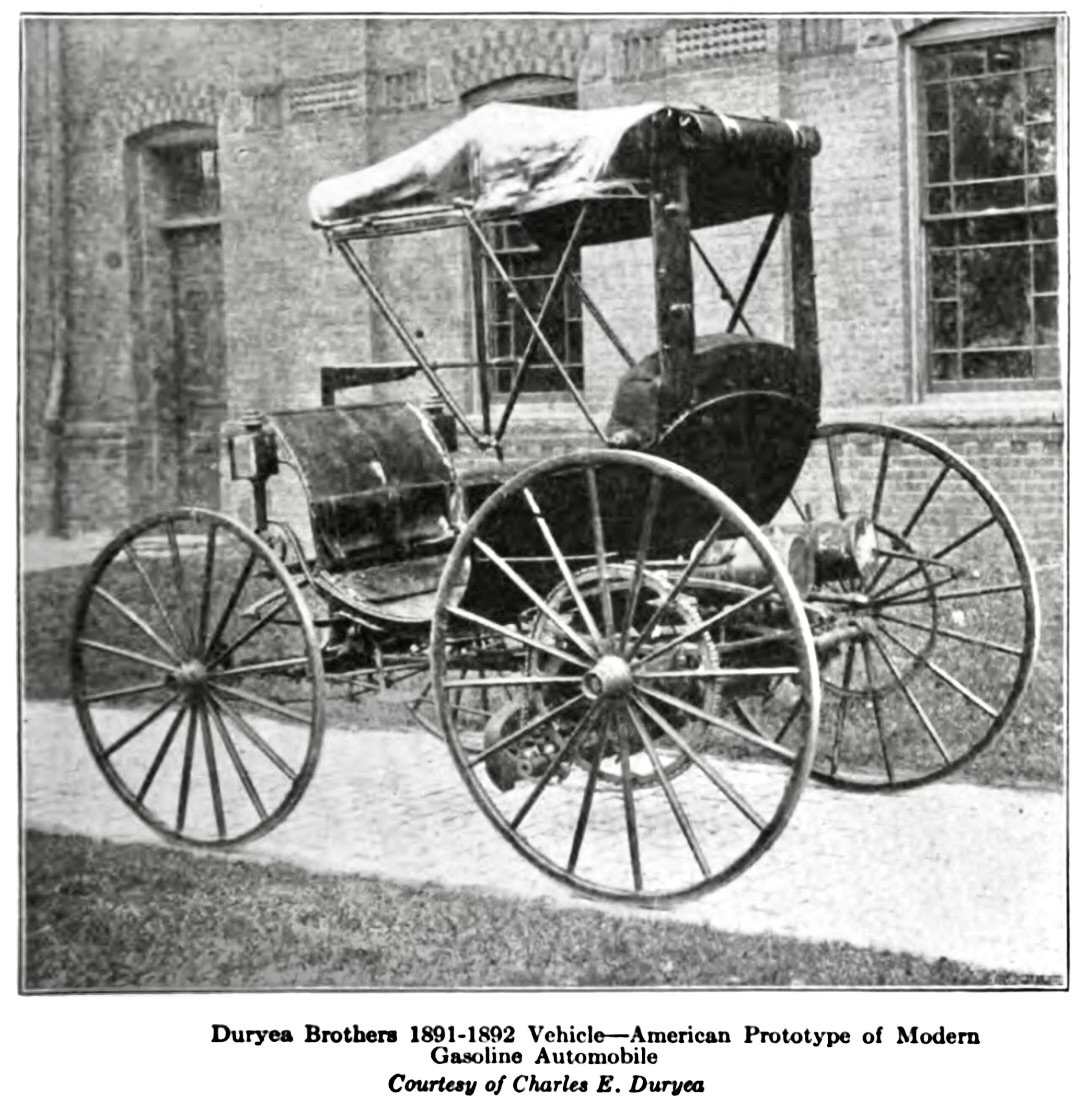
Duryea (1892)

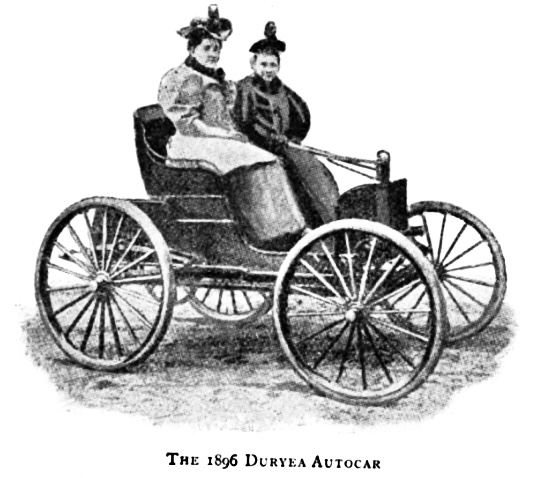
Duryea (1896)

The Duryea Motor Wagon Company, established in 1895 in Springfield, Massachusetts, was the first American firm to build gasoline automobiles.

== History ==
Founded by Charles Duryea and his brother Frank, the company built the Duryea Motor Wagon, a one-cylinder four-horsepower car, first demonstrated on September 21, 1893, in Springfield, Massachusetts, on Taylor Street in Metro Center. It is considered the second successful gas-engine vehicle built in the U.S., after the Buckeye gasoline buggy built by John William Lambert in 1891.

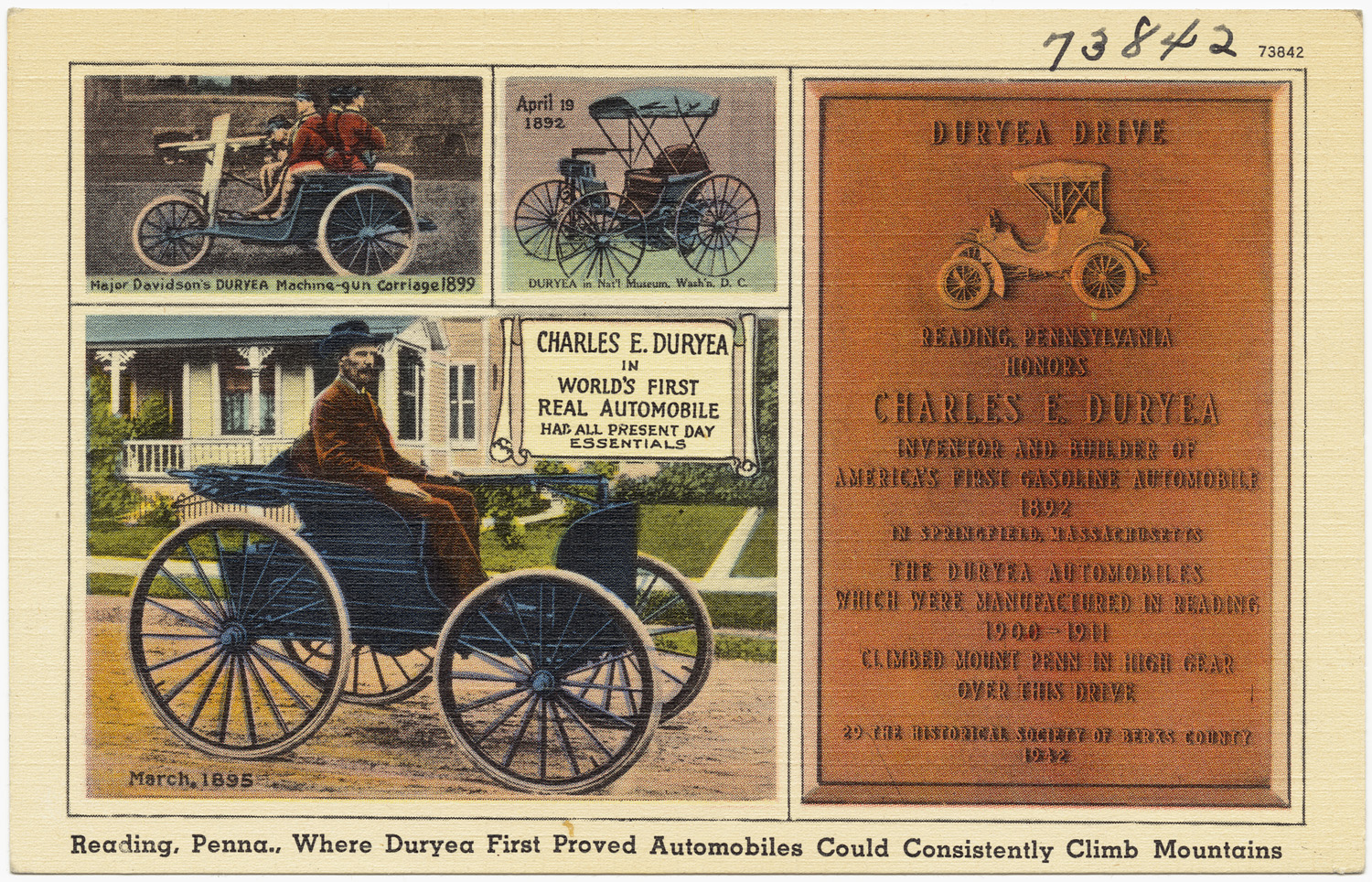
Reading, PA, "where Duryea first proved automobiles could consistently climb mountains"

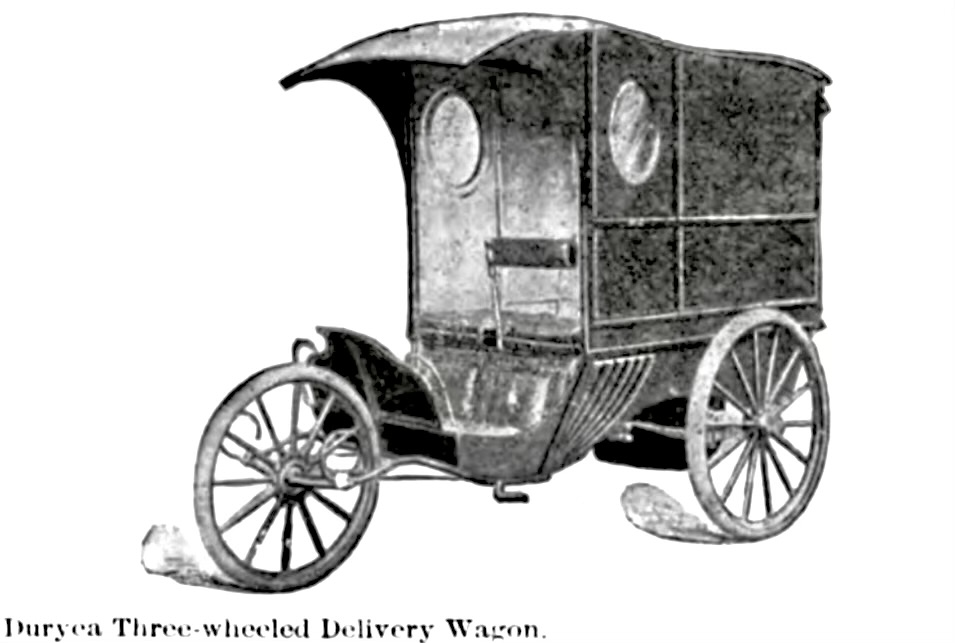
Duryea Delivery Wagon (1902)

In 1895, a second Duryea (built in 1894), driven by Frank, won the Chicago Times Herald race in Chicago on a snowy Thanksgiving day. He traveled 54 miles (87 km) at an average speed of 7.5 mph (12 km/h), marking the first U.S. auto race in which any entrants finished. That same year, the brothers began commercial production, with thirteen cars sold by the end of 1896. Their first ten production vehicles were the first automobiles sold in the United States. Banking on the idea that future racing successes would propel their market share, the brothers entered two vehicles in Britain's London to Brighton Veteran Car Run. Frank arrived first but was omitted from the official results; see Performance of the Duryea Cars.

The brothers went their separate ways by the end of the century, over a dispute for financing that would have required moving the company to Detroit. Frank helped produce the Stevens-Duryea (at gun maker Stevens) until 1927, while Charles produced Duryea vehicles as late as 1917. Based in Reading, Pennsylvania, it was not uncommon for residents to see him motoring a brand new automobile from City Park out to Mount Penn, using the switchback road as a final test of durability and refinement.

Charles Duryea moved to Reading in February 1900. By 1901, Duryea and Sternbergh incorporated the Duryea Power Company "for the manufacture of iron, steel, bath, any metal or wood or both, including automobiles, motors, propellers, and part of either." By March 1902, after overcoming difficulties procuring factory space, and a devastating flood of the Schuylkill River, Duryea was manufacturing one three-wheel, three-cylinder, gasoline-powered automobile each week. Most buyers were doctors, who enjoyed the power, reliability, and heady 20 mile-an-hour top speed of his vehicles.

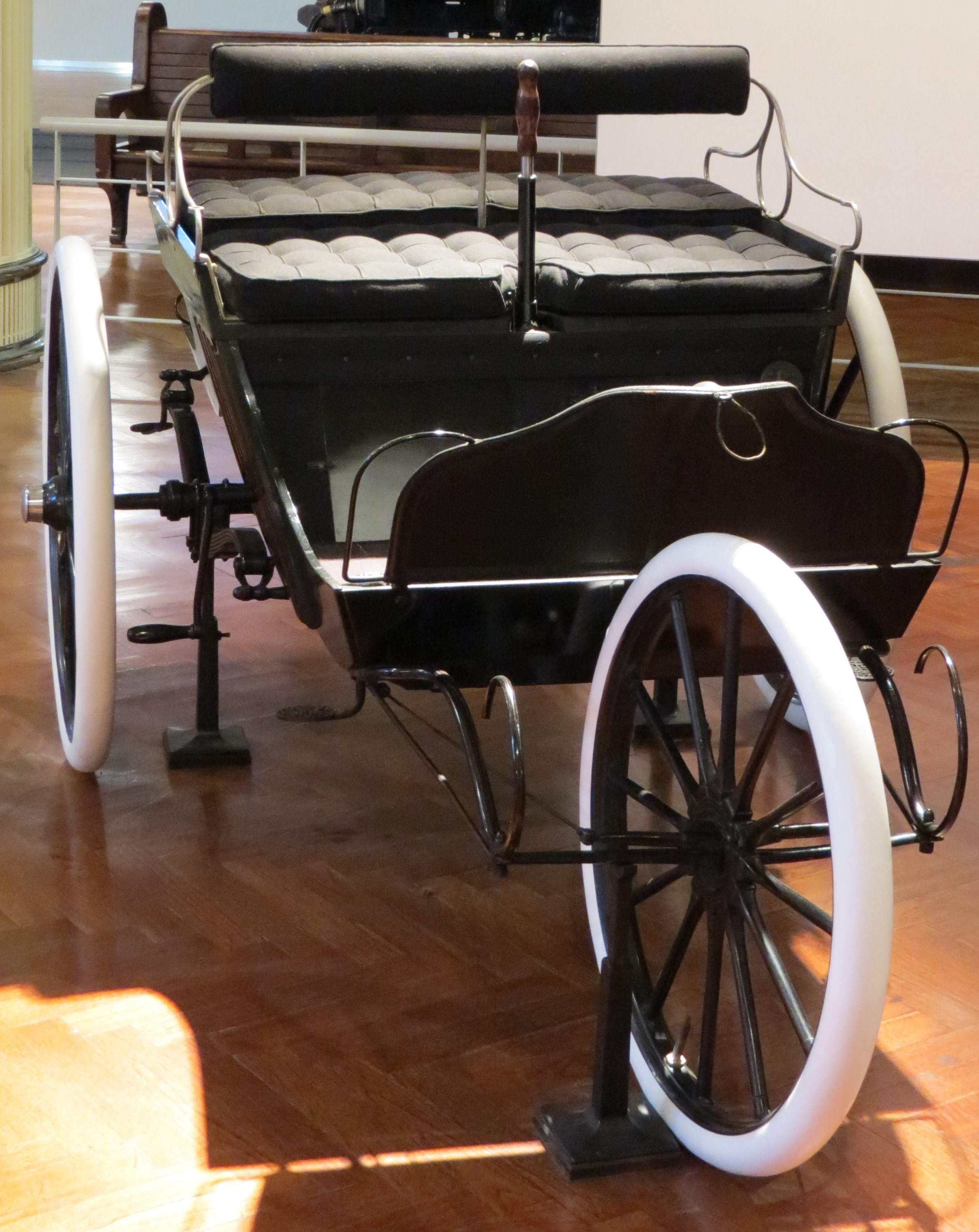
1899 Duryea on display at the Henry Ford Museum

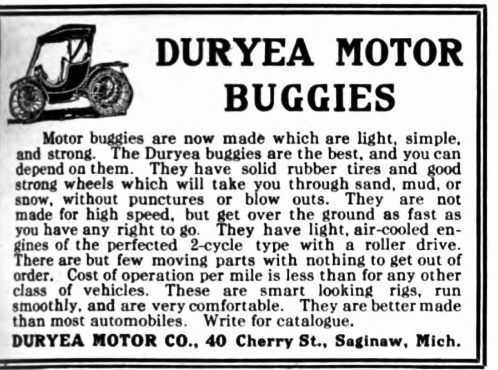
Duryea Motor Buggies (1908-1914)

By 1905, Duryea's fifty workers were manufacturing sixty cars a year, including the four-wheel Phaeton, which soon sold for $1,600. Duryea's automobiles were a success, but a dispute among the company's partners led to collapse of the business in 1907. Undaunted, Charles Duryea designed a new automobile with significant design innovations, including a two-cylinder, air-cooled engine, which he named the "Buggyaut." Manufactured in a garage at 32 Carpenter St., the Buggyaut was an inexpensive auto with large wheels designed for rural markets and unpaved roads. To make the car affordable, Duryea introduced a simple body design, mounted on the side bars of the chassis, in usual buggy fashion, that made the Buggyaut light and easy riding. The two-passenger model, complete with a top, sold for only $700, but the Buggyaut never achieved the success that he had envisioned. In 1914, Duryea closed the garage and left Reading.

In 1916, eight years after Henry Ford introduced his Model T, Duryea made another attempt to produce his own "car for the people." With financing from Keyser Fry of Reading, he created the Duryea GEM, a cross between an automobile and a motorcycle, with a newly designed engine and suspension. Advertised as the "Biggest Idea in the History of the Motor Car and the Last Word in Automobile Construction," the Duryea GEM combined the comfort and stability of an automobile with the simplicity, handling, and economy of a motorcycle. It was also extremely affordable, costing only $250 and boasting an impressive 65 miles of driving per gallon of gasoline. Once again, however, lack of funding forced Duryea to drop the project, with only six being thought to have been built. The GEM was the last automobile built by Charles Duryea.

Although Charles did discuss with Frank Duryea the building of the first commercially successful American automobile, Frank was the actual builder during their collaboration. He did correspond with his brother Charles regarding what did and did not work in the design. Charles left Springfield in 1892 before construction began. This was documented in transcripts during the Selden Patent trial.

Boyertown Museum of Historic Vehicles in Boyertown, Pennsylvania hosts an annual Duryea Day Antique and Classic Car Show, which features an extensive collection of automobiles manufactured in southeastern Pennsylvania in the early 20th century. Since 1951, the SCCA has sponsored a biannual "Duryea Hillclimb" race in Reading which traces Charles' original test route.

== See also ==
- Buckeye gasoline buggy
- Duryea Motor Wagon
- Duryea Power
- List of defunct United States automobile manufacturers
