= Chicago Times-Herald race =

First automobile race in the United States

"America's First Automobile Race" map

The Chicago Times-Herald race was the first automobile race held in the United States. Sponsored by the Chicago Times-Herald, the race was held in Chicago in 1895 among six automobiles: four gasoline and two electric, all four-wheelers. It was won by Frank Duryea's Motorized Wagon. The race created considerable publicity for the motocycle, which had been introduced in the United States only two years earlier.

== Preparations ==
On July 10, 1895, the Chicago Times-Herald announced a race to be held in the city with prizes totaling $5,000 (approximately $193,500 in 2025). Hermann H.Kohlsaat, the proprietor of the Times-Herald, put up the prize-money to foster the growth of the young auto industry in the United States and to boost sales of his newspaper. The first automobiles in the nation were produced only two years earlier, and they were so new at the time that the paper's editors hoped to establish a more forward-looking name for what were then called "horseless carriages" or "motor wagons". A competition for a new name with a prize of $500 preceded the race. The editors selected the term "Motocycle" and used it in their reporting, but it never gained populartity.

The original course of the race was from Chicago north to Milwaukee, but the roads were found to be too poor for early cars to traverse easily. The route was changed to be to Waukegan and back, a distance of 100 miles, and the date of the race was set as 2 November 1895.

The contest rules published before the race stated the following prizes were available.

Place	Prize Amount	Notes
First	$2,000 and a gold medal	Open to all competitors of the world.
Second	$1,500	In the event the first prize goes to a vehicle of foreign manufacture, the most successful American entry will receive this prize.
Third	$1,000	
Fourth	$500	
Total	$5,000	

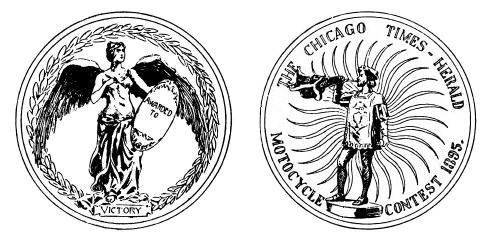
Drawing of the medal designed for the winner of the Chicago Times-Herald Race Motocycle Contest in 1895

== Exhibition Run on 2 November 1895 ==
By 1 November, the day before the race, it had become clear that, while many wished to take part, few were ready to do so. The race was rescheduled to Thanksgiving Day and the next day's event turned into an Exhibition Run of 100 miles to Waukegan and back. A purse of $500 would be divided equally among those participants who returned within 13 hours.

Only two cars started: a Benz Vis-à-vis driven by Oscar B.Mueller of Decatur, Ill; and a Duryea Motor Wagon driven by J.Frank Duryea of Springfield, Mass.

The Duryea led from the start, then a chain snapped. It took 48 minutes for a blacksmith to repair the damage and Mueller's Benz took the lead. The Duryea suffered a smash on a narrow road at Prairie View. Duryea blew his whistle to alert a farmer with a team in the road. The farmer and Duryea both headed to the left and Duryea drove into a ditch to avoid a collision. One wheel was wrecked and the vehicle had to be hauled to the nearest railway station and sent back by rail.

The day was very hot and the Benz struggled in the heat: two big cans of ice were strapped to the water jacket of the cylinder to keep it cool. More ice was taken on during the journey (Note: The Benz engine was water-cooled but used an open system: some heat was lost by radiation from the sides of the copper water tanks, but most of the cooling was from boiling of coolant water, which extracted from the remaining coolant the latent heat of vaporization of that which had boiled. Water consumption was therefore prodigious: several times that of gasoline. The colder the water which replenished that lost, the longer it would last. Ice packs around the cylinder of the engine also helped.). The Benz's cruising speed (Note: Early Benz vehicles used belt drive to a counter-shaft and then chain drive to the wheels. There was no throttle and the engine was designed to run at constant speed. After 1890 Benz vehicles had two belt-systems for two different speeds. The driver selected one and then the vehicle's speed depended on the effort required to propel the vehicle forward.) was 12mph; in places it had to be pushed up hills. Running time was 8 hours 44 minutes, elapsed time 9 hours 30 minutes Having completed the course within the 13 hours, Mueller received the entire purse of $500.

Although the Duryea crashed out early in the run, its early lead suggests that it was faster than the Benz. As it had failed to catch the Benz by Prairie View (39 miles), its average speed when running cannot have exceeded 15 mph. (Note: This assumes that the Benz was travelling at its average running speed from the start to Prairie View and that the Duryea had a 48-minute handicap.)

== Competitors ==
The race was only 54 miles (87 km) from Chicago to Evanston and back. The finish line was near what is now the Chicago Museum of Science and Industry (what had been the Palace of Fine Arts at the 1893 Columbian Exposition).

Eighty-three cars were initially entered into the race, but only six arrived for the actual competition. Many of the entrants did not have their cars completed on time, and several were unable to make the journey. Elwood Haynes' car, which was a favorite to win the race, was damaged en route and unable to compete.

Both Haynes and the driver of a Benz car were stopped by police while driving their cars into the city. They were forced to requisition horses to pull the cars because, as the police informed them, they had no right to drive their vehicles on the city streets. The situation caused the race to be again postponed while the Chicago Times-Herald editors convinced the city leaders to pass an ordinance to confirm the right of these vehicles to travel on city streets.

== Events of 28 November 1895 ==
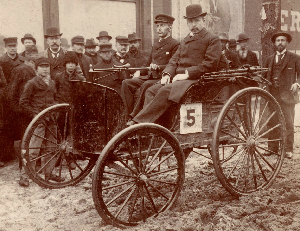
Frank Duryea's Motorized Wagon winning motocycle

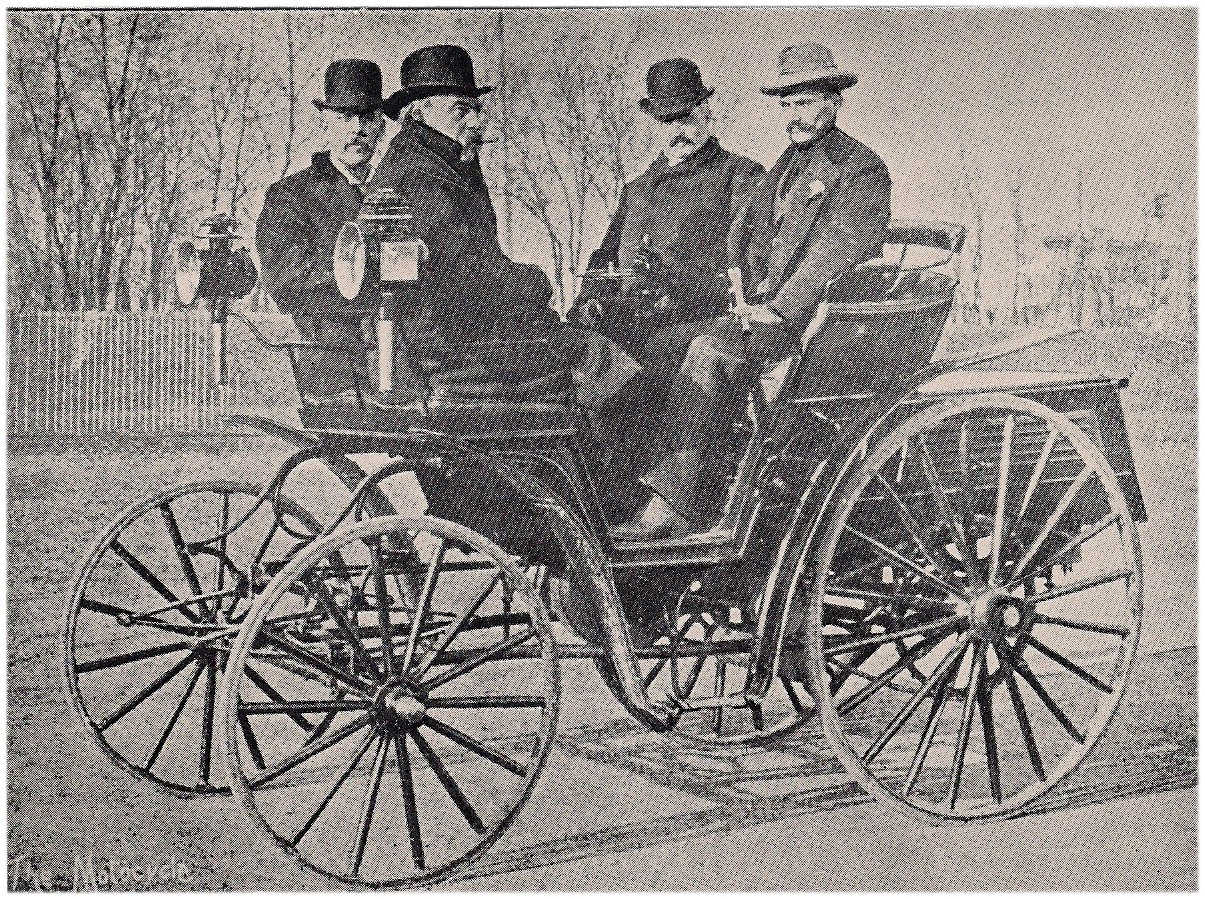
Benz Vis-à-vis entered by Oscar Mueller – awarded second-place

Once the ordinance passed, the race was held on November 28, Thanksgiving Day. The day was snowy and 38 °F (4 °C), the roads muddy, with snow drifts in places.

The first car to arrive at the starting line was a German-made car by inventor Karl Benz. In total, three Benz cars ran in the race, all imported from Benz's agent in France, Emile Roger. (Note: Emile Roger was far more entrepreneurial than Carl Benz and is reported to have sold three Benz vehicles to the US which took part in the race. The report in the Chicago Herald-Tribune says that Mueller's Benz was imported direct from Mannheim. This is entirely possible: Roger made the sale and arranged for Benz to ship the vehicle to Chicago. Roger's activities were primarily sales, marketing and support, possibly with some assembly of the Velo.) The only other petrol-engined car to run in the race was Frank Duryea's motorized wagon. The two other vehicles that took part were electric: a Sturge's Electro Motocycle, and a Morris & Salom Electrobat. Their owners had planned to have "supply stations" on the course where they could presumably have had the batteries changed for fully-charged ones, but had failed to arrange this. In practice they lacked the power to climb one of the course's grades and died from the cold weather before getting far.

Just after starting, one Benz collided with a horse tram which it was following along the tram tracks. The horse tram stopped; the Benz slipped on the tracks and was unable to do so. It was forced to leave the race. The contest lay between the Duryea and Mueller's Benz.

According to news accounts, Mueller's Benz "puffed its way slowly and laboriously along, its [solid-rubber] (Note: The newspaper reported them as pneumatic. They weren't. In his memoir about the race, Charles King (who was on the Benz) footnotes the newspaper report to correct its mistake.) tires wrapped with twine to keep them from slipping, and one of its operators sanding the belt on the motor for the same reason." From point 31 of the course to the finish Mueller's car was driven by Charles Brady King because Mueller went unconscious from exposure. King was originally an umpire to the race and of this motocycle.

== Result and Post-race prizes ==
The race was meant to start at 9am. Duryea was sent off at 8:55am and crossed the finishing line at 7:18pm, completing the race with an elapsed time of 10 hours 23 minutes. His running time was 7 hours and 53 minutes, the difference primarily attributable to two breakdowns which required the use of a forge (having built his vehicle, he was able to make repairs which were beyond other drivers). His average speed over the course was 5.0 mph and, when running, 6.7 mph (11 km/h). For the last 12 miles of the course (from Douglas Park) he benefited from having a horse-drawn sleigh break a trail for him through the snow.

Mueller had replaced the drive belts on his Benz the day before the race and was delayed reaching the start by slippage of the driving belt over the pulleys. (Note: The Benz had two belt-systems which provided two speeds. Each belt ran over its own pulleys. Slippage was addressed by sanding the belt.) He started at 10:06 am and finished at 8:53 pm. His elapsed time was 10 hours 47 minutes with a running time of 9 hours 32 minutes. His average speed over the course was 4.9 mph and, when running, 5.5 mph. Charles King later wrote:

It was a day for showing the benefits of the pneumatic tire over the solid rubber tire... The solid rubber tire acted like a knife, and cut through the slush, and even into the mud below. The pneumatic tires on the other hand presented a slightly flattened surface which enabled the carriages thus equipped to ride on the crust and maintain a speed that was impossible with us."

The performance of the other starters was as follows:

- Macy's Benz (#22) collided with a streetcar on the way to Evanston and with a sleigh and then a hack on the way back; its engine failed at 6.15pm when it had been catching up with the Duryea and was only 25 minutes behind. At 11.30pm, after 5 hours trying to get it going again, they abandoned did not finish within the allowed time;
- Morris & Salom Electrobat (#18) drove 15 miles (24 km) and then returned to testing headquarters;
- Sturges Electro Motocycle (#25) abandoned the race after 12 miles;
- De La Vergne Refrigerating Machine Co. Benz (#7) retired on the way out after South Park because of the lack of traction on the snowy roads; it was awarded the smallest prize ($50).

Neither of the cars which finished followed the course: Duryea diverted to find a forge; the Mueller Benz (then driven by Umpire Charles King) diverted to avoid snow-drifts. In each case the diversion was longer than the correct route. Mueller's car had to be pushed at times and Mueller did not drive the whole way.

The Fort Worth Gazette stated, "The prizes will be awarded on the showing made in the road race, and in the scientific tests which have been made under the supervision of the best experts in the country." The official prize results were not announced until December 5, 1895. The race judges determined that "All contestants violated the rules of the race. None of the three contestants which finished at Jackson Park kept the course."

"The judges were compelled to make their awards based on the showing in the tests and in the road race. The test took precedence in the rules, but the remarkable run made by Duryea and Mueller compelled substantial recognition. It was deemed fair to make an award of the gold medal based largely on tests, and it therefore, went to Salom-Morris. The other awards were made on road performances and on special points in design." A significant factor in the judges' decision was that city ordinances prohibited businesses from supplying vehicles using gasoline, so electric vehicles were better suited to city streets. Total prize money awarded was $5,000.

Vehicle Information	Prize Awarded	Prize Rationale and Notes
Duryea Motocycle Company; Springfield, MA; Duryea; Race #5	$2,000	"Carriage made best performance and average speed. Best pull and compact design." Failed to keep to the course, and was repaired by a blacksmith which violated the race rules.
H. Mueller & Co. Decatur, IL; Benz; Race #19	$1,500	"Wagon made best performance in road. Most economy in operation." Failed to keep to the course, and pushed by outsiders.
R. H. Macy & Co. New York, NY; Benz; Race #22	$500	"Best showing made in road race." Failed to keep to the course, and did not finish within the allowed time.
Sturges Electro Motocycle; Chicago, IL; Sturges; Race #25	$500	"For showing made in road race." Abandoned after 12 miles (19 km). The Sturges was built by William Morrison in Des Moines, Iowa between 1888 and 1890. This vehicle was purchased by Harold Sturges, and he demonstrated it at the World's Columbian Exposition held in Chicago during 1893.
Morris & Salom Electrobat; Philadelphia, PA; Morris & Salom; Race #18	Gold medal (Valued at $250)	"Best show in official tests." Did not attempt to complete the course. Drove 15 miles (24 km) of race and then returned to testing headquarters. Award of the gold medal was based on, "Safety; easy of control; absence of noise, vibration, heat or odor; cleanliness, and general excellence of design and workmanship."
G. W. Lewis Motocycle; Chicago, IL	$200	Special prize money given ". . . for friction driving device and brake and a reduction gear for increasing speed."
Haynes & Apperson Gasoline Wagon; Kokomo, IN	$150	Special prize money given ". . . for plan of preventing vibration by balance of driving engines."
George Hertel Gasoline Wagon; Chicago, IL	$100	Special prize money given ". . . for a device for starting the motor from the operator's seat in the vehicle."
De La Vergne Refrigerating Machine Co. New York, NY; Benz; Race #7	$50	Special prize money given ". . . for counterbalance of engine." Some papers state they quit the race at 16th Street and others at 64th Street.

The race was the first known automobile race in the United States. Newspapers across the country carried stories about it. Many predicted the demise of horse-borne transportation, citing the cars' ability to travel even in poor weather.

The success of the race sped up the rate of automobile development by at least five years in the United States due to the event's publicity. The commercial production of American automobiles began only a year later.

== Epilogue ==
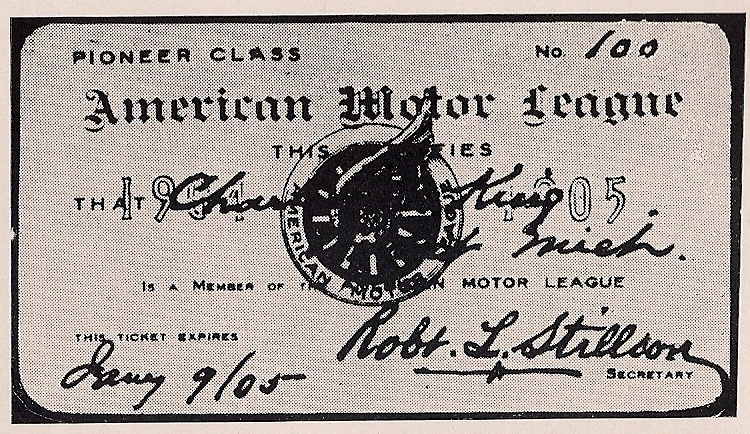
American Motor League membership card

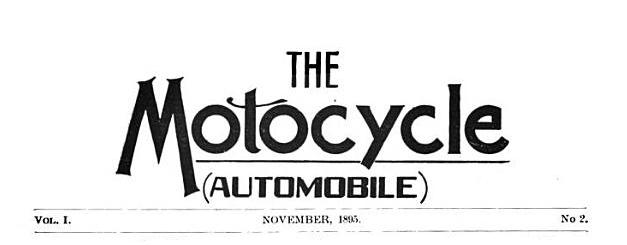
Partial cover from the second issue of The Motocycle

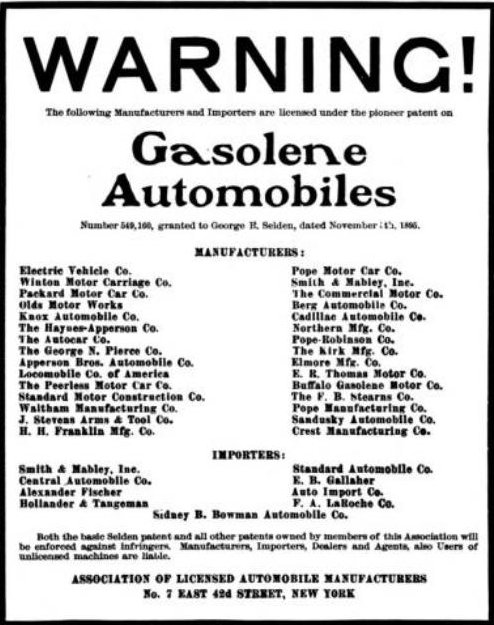
Notice published to promote the purchase of only Selden licensed automobiles

The Smithsonian Institution states the following regarding the winning Duryea car. "This car was unfortunately destroyed through a workman's misunderstanding many years ago." The second-place car of Hieronymus Mueller is on display in the Mueller Museum in Decatur, Illinois.

In addition to the enormous amount of publicity the race generated, several other automotive developments were related to this race.

- Adoption of pneumatic tires. The superiority of pneumatic tires over solid rubber was manifest: Mueller struggled through the slush and snow despite having wrapped twine around his tires in an attempt to improve traction. American manufacturers led Europe in adopting pneumatic tires.
- Motocycle. The early term for the automobile, "motocycle", was born out of a pre-race contest sponsored by the Chicago Times-Herald newspaper to replace the term "horseless carriage" with something better. The term was never prevalent, and it has largely fallen into disuse. The Indian Motocycle Manufacturing Company used this term consistently to describe its motorcycles from their earliest days until 1953.
- First automotive club. Charles King, one of the drivers to have taken part in the November 2, 1895, contest, sent letters on October 8, 1895, proposing an automobile club be formed. This led to the creation of the American Motor League on November 1, 1895, in Chicago on the eve of what became the exhibition run between Mueller and Duryea motocycles. At the second meeting, Charles Duryea was elected president on November 29, 1895.
- First U.S. automotive trade publication. Edward E. Goff in Chicago, almost certainly inspired by the Chicago Times-Herald Race, began publishing the first English language automobile magazine Motocycle in October 1895. This was one month before the well-known publication Horseless Age which claimed to be the first such publication.
- Selden patent. The Morris & Salom Electrobat was the beginnings of the Electric Vehicle Company of Philadelphia. This firm, although no longer producing automobiles by 1899, acquired the legal rights to the Selden patent and began the process of trying to collect licensing fees from all U.S. automobile manufacturers.

== See also ==
- Motorsport before 1906
