= J. Frank Duryea =

19/20th-century American engineer

James Frank Duryea
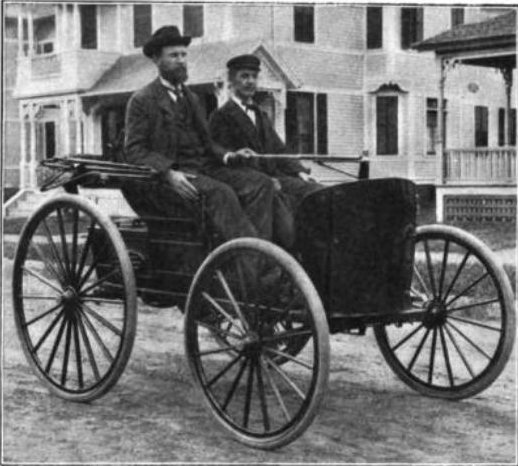
- J. Frank Duryea (right) with Charles Duryea
- Born: October 8, 1869; Washburn, Illinois, US
- Died: February 15, 1967 (aged 97); Saybrook, Connecticut, US
- Engineering career
- Significant advance: automobile

James Frank Duryea (October 8, 1869 – February 15, 1967) was an American engineer and inventor who, with his brother Charles (1861–1938), made the second American gasoline-powered automobile, but were the first outside of Europe to invent, manufacture, and sell their vehicles.

== Biography ==
The brothers were born in Illinois, Charles in Canton, Illinois, in 1861 and Frank in Washburn, Illinois, in 1869. Both graduated from high school. Charles moved to Washington, D.C., to work in the bicycle business. Frank followed closely on his heels in 1888. Two more moves in as many years brought the Duryea brothers to Springfield, Massachusetts. Charles had already earned a reputation for unusual design elements in his "sylph" bicycle, with a smaller wheel in front and a steering lever on the sides of the seat. Said one colleague, "Charles, it's a freak."

The two brothers researched the internal combustion engine at the Springfield public library. Charles drew the designs and made the connection with their chief investor, Erwin Markham. Markham provided $1,000, which paid for space in an old machine shop, a collection of cast-off parts, including an old phaeton buggy, and Frank's $3-a-day salary. Charles went back to Illinois to follow other pursuits.

Frank worked ten hours a day to make Charles's design a reality. Over the course of four road tests, Frank changed those designs in significant ways. By trial-and-error, Frank worked out problems of ignition, carburetion, and transmission. He devised a method of muffling the engine's extreme noise with a wooden box. In January 1894 Frank made what he believed was his first successful road test.

A total of three times Erwin Markham agreed to provide money, but when it came time to put the vehicle in production he backed out. 175 other investors stepped forward to buy $100 shares. Frank was awarded 160 shares, and Charles was given 320. The Duryea Motor Wagon Company was established in 1895. It was incorporated in September 1895, two months before the Chicago Times-Herald race.

== Winner of the first car race on American soil ==
On November 28, 1895, Frank Duryea won the first motor-car race in the United States of America, the Chicago Times-Herald race. The race course was a 54-mile loop along the lakeshore from Chicago to Evanston, then through multiple Chicago neighborhoods, and then back to the starting point. The race was a harrowing one—it was held during one of Chicago’s great snowstorms, two of the contestants became comatose from exposure to the cold, and the contestants’ cars got stuck in snowdrifts, slid into other vehicles, and stalled repeatedly. Duryea, who completed the race in 10 hours and 23 minutes, traveled at an average speed of 5 1/4 miles per hour.

The world’s first motor race, the 1894 Paris–Rouen, had clearly demonstrated the merits of the Daimler gasoline motor and had generated a great deal of publicity for the horseless carriage. Herman H. Kohlstaat, the publisher of the Chicago Times-Herald and a tireless booster of the newfangled automotive technology, decided to drum up interest in the motor wagon by sponsoring a similar race. More than 80 people entered, most of whom were building their own cars at home; as a result, the event had to be postponed twice because the vast majority of the racers weren’t yet ready. Only two people made it to an exhibition race at the beginning of November: Frank Duryea of Springfield, Massachusetts, driving a "buggyaut" that his brother Charles had designed, and Oscar Mueller of Chicago, driving his father’s imported Benz. (Mueller won the race; Duryea had swerved to avoid a farmer’s wagon and had fallen into a ditch.)

On the morning of November 28, six inches of snow covered the race-course. A horse-drawn snowplow inched along ineffectually. Because of the bad weather, only six of 89 racers had made it to the starting line: Duryea; Mueller; a Benz sponsored by Macy’s that, the store hoped, would help it to advertise the cars it had begun to sell; a Benz sponsored by the De La Vergne Refrigeration Company of New York; and two electric cars: a Sturges Electro Motocycle, and a Morris & Salom Electrobat.

Ten hours and 23 minutes after the race began, the Duryea wagon drove across the finish line, finishing first. Meanwhile, according to news accounts, the Mueller moto-cycle "puffed its way slowly and laboriously along, its pneumatic tires wrapped with twine to keep them from slipping, and one of its operators sanding the belt on the motor for the same reason." It crossed the finish line an hour and a half after Duryea had—though Mueller himself, who had fainted from all the excitement, was no longer at the wheel. The Macy’s Benz was perhaps the most hapless racer of all: It collided with a streetcar on the way to Evanston and with a sleigh and then a hack on the way back, and never did finish. Neither did the De La Vergne Benz.

But the race had accomplished what Kohlstadt had hoped it would: It introduced Americans to the motor-wagon and proved once and for all that the days of the horse and buggy were numbered. For his part, Frank Duryea returned to his shop in Massachusetts and continued his work and research to improve his vehicles. In 1896, the Duryeas built 13 cars by hand—and thus they became the first gas-powered automobile factory in the United States.

== Death ==
Frank Duryea died in Saybrook, Connecticut, on February 15, 1967, aged 97. He was the last surviving member of the automotive industry's founding fathers.

== Legacy ==
In 1996, he was inducted into the Automotive Hall of Fame.
