= Duryea Motor Wagon =

1890s automobile

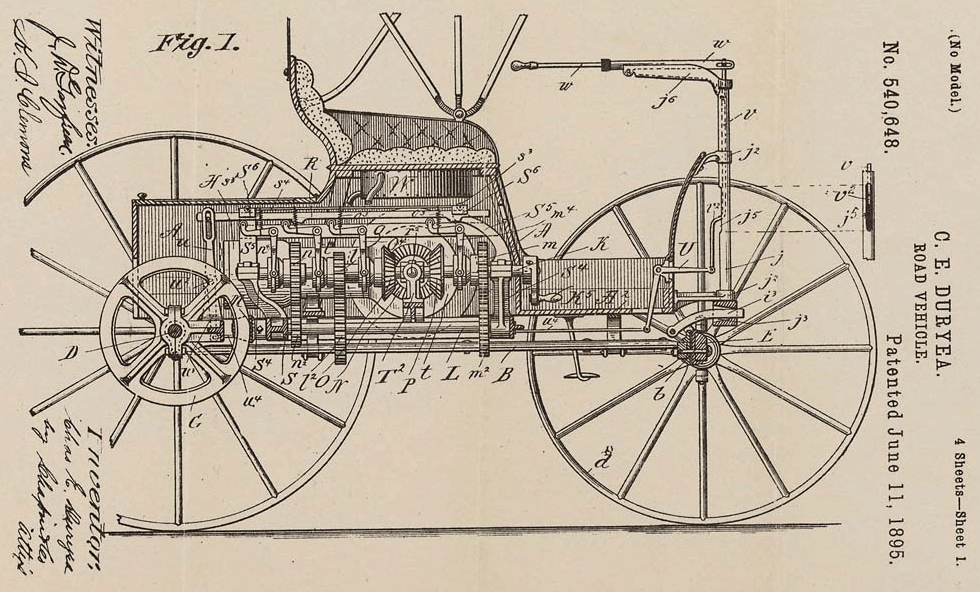
Patent drawing for the Duryea Road Vehicle, 1895

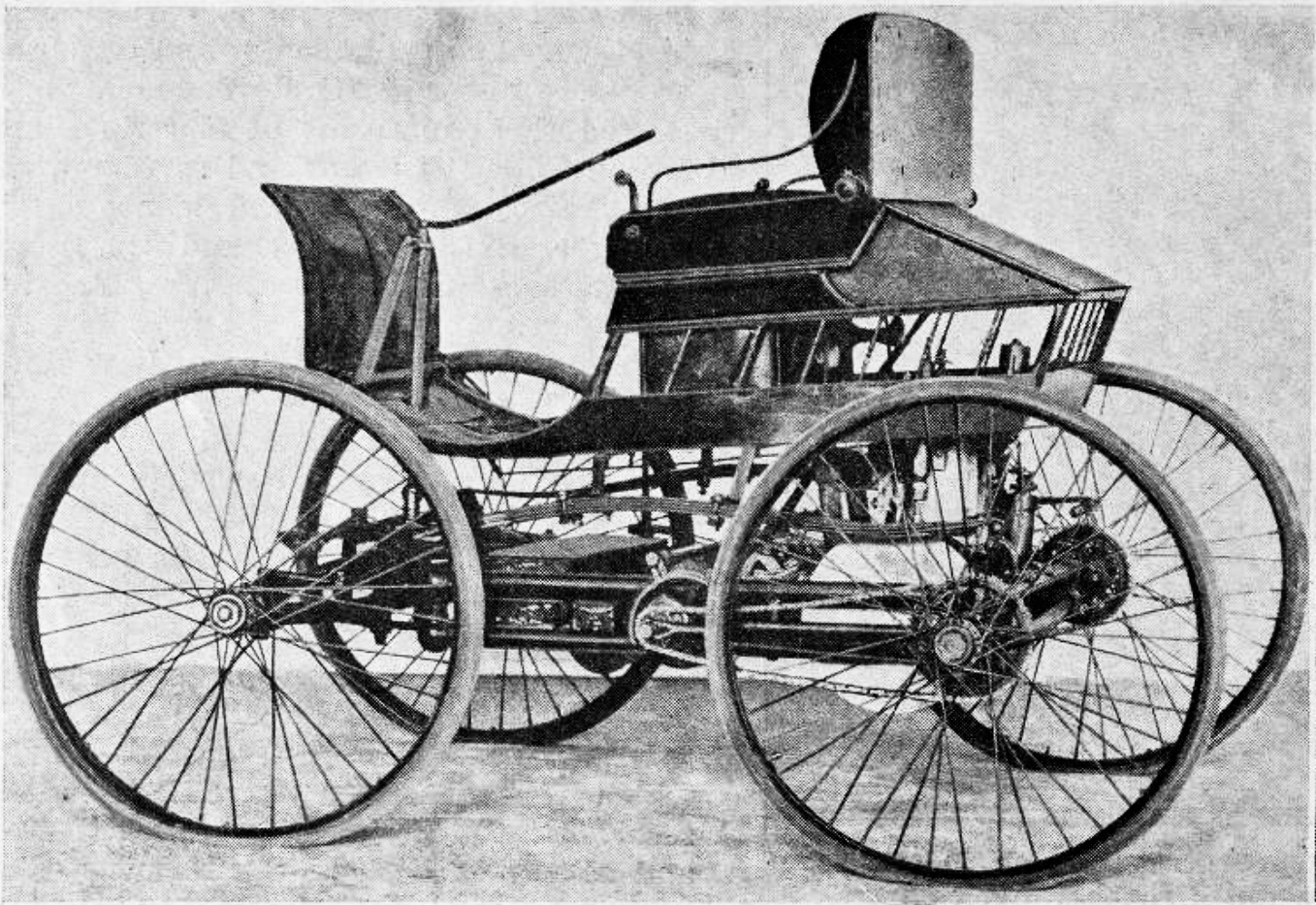
Duryea Motor Wagon (1894)

The Duryea Motor Wagon was among the first standardized automobiles and among the first powered by gasoline. Fifteen examples were built by the Duryea Motor Wagon Company of Chicopee, Massachusetts, between 1893 and 1896. Their enterprise followed the first commercially available automobile which was patented by Karl Benz on January 29, 1886, and put into production in 1888.

To construct the first Duryea Motor Wagon, the brothers had purchased a used horse-drawn buggy for $70 and then installed a 4-horsepower (3.0 kW; 4.1 PS), single cylinder gasoline engine. The car had a friction transmission, spray carburetor, and low tension ignition. It was road-tested again on 10 November, when the newspaper The Springfield Republican made the announcement. The car was put into storage in 1894 and stayed there until 1920 when it was rescued by Inglis M. Uppercu, and restored by J. Frank Duryea and his son before being presented to the United States National Museum..

The Duryea brothers entered their horseless carriage in many shows and races. The Duryea Motor Wagon carriage won first place in the first-ever American automobile race, the Times-Herald race, in 1895. The Duryeas also won first and second place in the Cosmopolitan Race on Decoration Day, 1896 in New York City. On November 14, 1896, they joined the Procession/Race from London to Brighton England.

Davidson-Duryea Gun Carriage

The Duryea was used as the basis of the Davidson-Duryea car of 1898, which has the distinction of being the first American armored car. The car, which was photographed by the Chicago Tribune, was adapted from the commercial passenger model by installing a forward-firing M1895 Colt-Browning machine gun operated by the front passenger. It featured an armored shield between the front wheel and steering tiller. The conversion was devised by inventor Major (later Colonel) R.P. Davidson, of the Illinois National Guard, then commandant of the Northwestern Military and Naval Academy, Highland Park, Illinois.

The First Duryea

Year	Engine	Power	Wheel size
1893	1-cylinder	4 hp (3.0 kW; 4.1 PS)	54 in (140 cm)

== See also ==
- Duryea Motor Wagon Company
- High wheeler
- Horse and buggy
- List of automotive superlatives
- Quadricycle
- Wagon
