= History of the automobile =

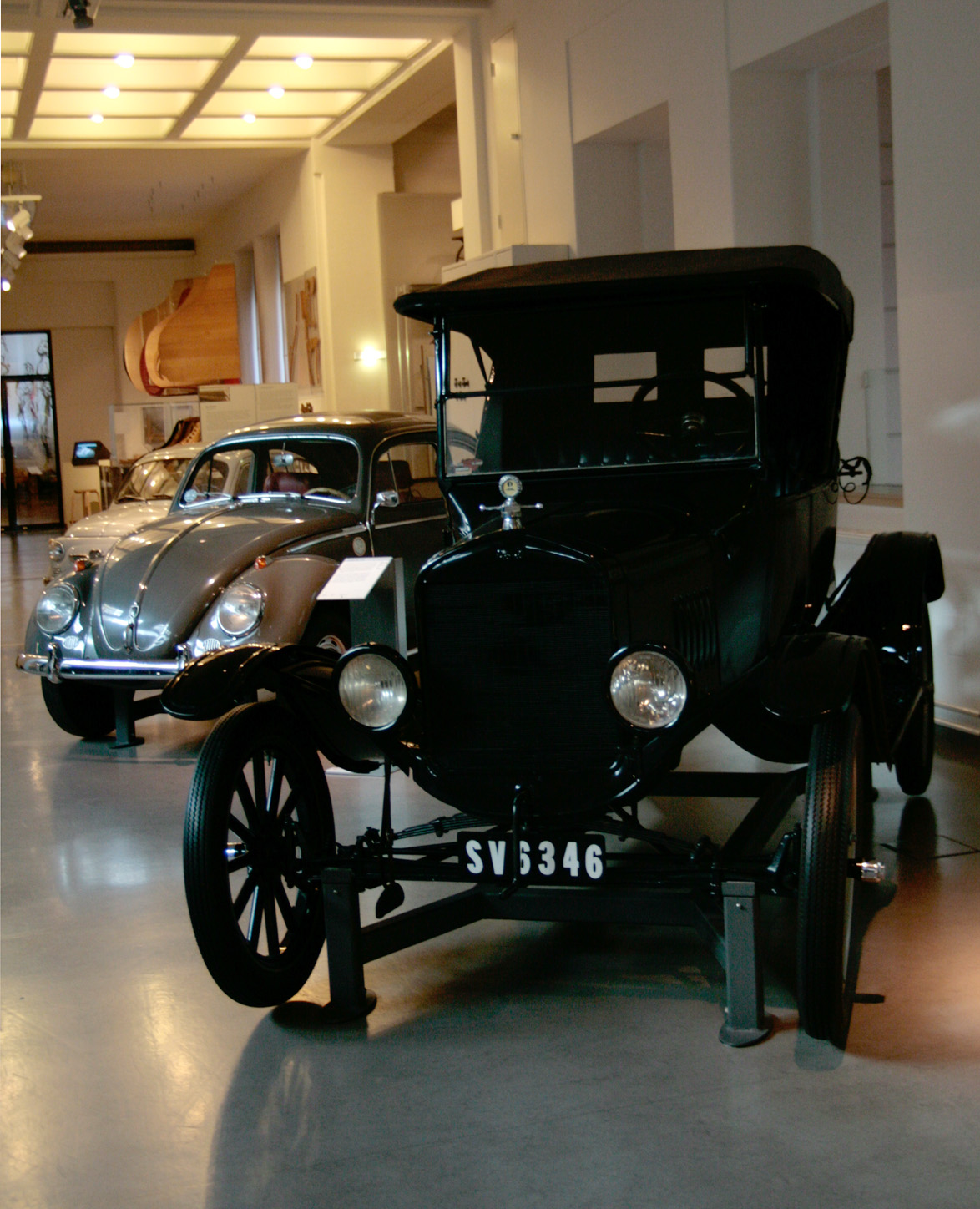
The Ford Model T (foreground) and Volkswagen Beetle (background) are among the most mass-produced car models in history.

Crude ideas and designs of automobiles can be traced back to ancient and medieval times. In 1649, Hans Hautsch of Nuremberg built a clockwork-driven carriage. In 1672, a small-scale steam-powered vehicle was created by Ferdinand Verbiest; the first steam-powered automobile capable of human transportation was built by Nicolas-Joseph Cugnot in 1769. Inventors began to branch out at the start of the 19th century, creating the de Rivaz engine, one of the first internal combustion engines, and an early electric motor. Samuel Brown later tested the first industrially applied internal combustion engine in 1826. Only two of these were made.

Development was hindered in the mid-19th century by a backlash against large vehicles, yet progress continued on some internal combustion engines. The engine evolved as engineers created two- and four-cycle combustion engines and began using gasoline. The first modern car—a practical, marketable automobile for everyday use—and the first car in series production appeared in 1886, when Carl Benz developed a gasoline-powered automobile and made several identical copies. In 1890, Gottlieb Daimler, inventor of the high-speed liquid petroleum-fueled engine, and Wilhelm Maybach formed Daimler Motoren Gesellschaft. In 1926, the company merged with Benz & Cie. (founded by Carl Benz in 1883) to form Daimler-Benz, known for its Mercedes-Benz automobile brand.

From 1886, many inventors and entrepreneurs got into the "horseless carriage" business, both in America and Europe, and inventions and innovations rapidly furthered the development and production of automobiles. Ransom E. Olds founded Oldsmobile in 1897, and introduced the Curved Dash Oldsmobile in 1901. Olds pioneered the assembly line using identical, interchangeable parts, producing thousands of Oldsmobiles by 1903. Although sources differ, approximately 19,000 Oldsmobiles were built, with the last produced in 1907. Production likely peaked from 1903 through 1905, at up to 5,000 units a year. In 1908, the Ford Motor Company further revolutionized automobile production by developing and selling its Ford Model T at a relatively modest price. From 1913, introducing an advanced moving assembly line allowed Ford to lower the Model T's price by almost 50%, making it the first mass-affordable automobile.

== Power sources ==
The early automobile history concentrated on searching for a reliable portable power unit to propel the vehicle.

=== Steam-powered wheeled vehicles ===
==== 17th and 18th centuries ====
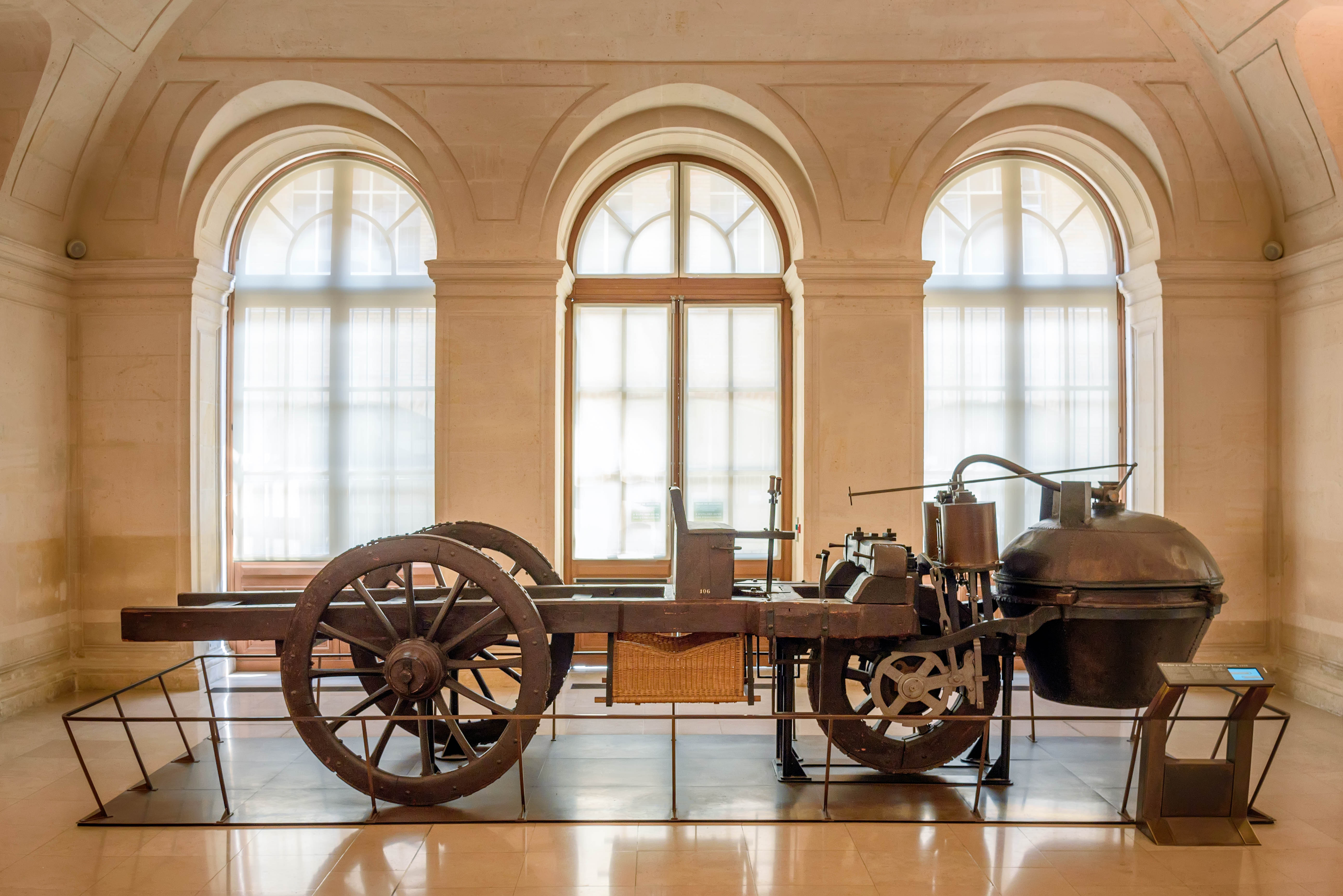
Cugnot's steam wagon, the second (1771) version

Ferdinand Verbiest, a member of a Jesuit mission in China, built a steam-powered vehicle around 1672 as a toy for the Kangxi Emperor. It was small-scale and could not carry a driver, but it was, perhaps, the first working steam-powered vehicle ('auto-mobile').

Steam-powered self-propelled vehicles large enough to transport people and cargo were devised in the late 18th century. Nicolas-Joseph Cugnot demonstrated his fardier à vapeur ("steam dray"), an experimental steam-driven artillery tractor, in 1770 and 1771. Cugnot's design proved impractical, and his invention was not developed in his native France. The center of innovation shifted to Great Britain. By 1784, William Murdoch had built a working model of a steam carriage in Redruth and in 1801 Richard Trevithick was running a full-sized vehicle on the roads in Camborne.

==== 19th century ====
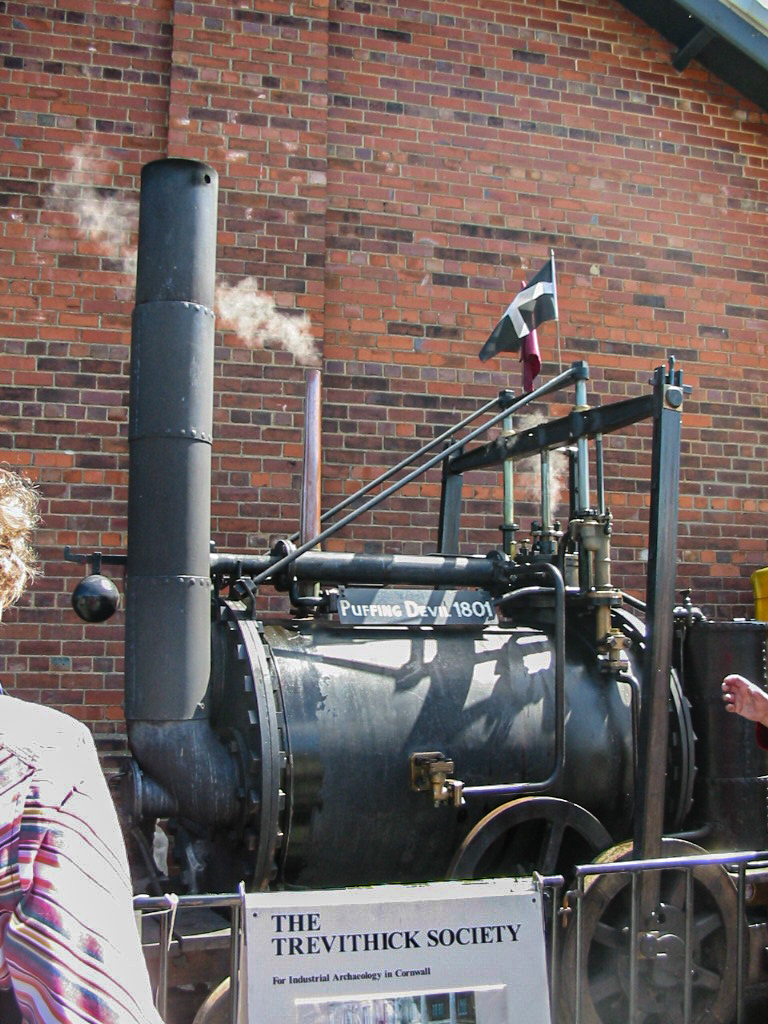
A replica of Richard Trevithick's 1801 road locomotive 'Puffing Devil'

During the early 19th century, there were successful attempts in Britain to introduce steam-powered coaches, such as those of Gurney and Hancock. However, opposing interests succeeded in making services uneconomical by charging exaggerated turnpike tolls. The use of steam for transport switched to the railways. From the mid-century, steam was used for heavy vehicles to provide motive power for haulage and in agriculture. A backlash against these large vehicles being used on roads resulted in legislation such as the UK Locomotives Act 1865. This required mechanically-powered vehicles on public roads to be preceded by a man on foot carrying a red flag. This hindered road transport development in the United Kingdom for the rest of the 19th century. After the successful development of light motor cars in France and Germany, lobbying by motorists succeeded in getting the law lifted in 1896 for vehicles weighing less than 3 tons.

In 1816, a professor at Prague Polytechnic, Josef Bozek, built an oil-fired steam car. Walter Hancock, builder and operator of London steam buses, in 1838 built a two-seated car phaeton.

In 1867, Canadian jeweler Henry Seth Taylor demonstrated his four-wheeled "steam buggy" at the Stanstead Fair in Stanstead, Quebec and again the following year. The basis of the buggy, which he began building in 1865, was a high-wheeled carriage with bracing to support a two-cylinder steam engine mounted on the floor. In 1873, Frenchman Amédée Bollée built self-propelled steam road vehicles to transport groups of passengers.

The first automobile suitable for use on existing wagon roads in the United States was a steam-powered vehicle invented in 1871 by Dr. J.W. Carhart, a minister of the Methodist Episcopal Church, in Racine, Wisconsin. It induced the state of Wisconsin in 1875 to offer a US$10,000 (equivalent to $293,182 in 2025) award to the first to produce a substitute for the use of horses and other animals. They stipulated that the vehicle would have to maintain an average speed of more than 8 km/h (5 mph) over a 320 km (200 mi) course. The offer led to the first city-to-city automobile race in the United States, starting on 16 July 1878 in Green Bay, Wisconsin, and ending in Madison, Wisconsin, via Appleton, Oshkosh, Waupun, Watertown, Fort Atkinson, and Janesville. While seven vehicles were registered, only two started competing: the Green Bay and Oshkosh entries. The vehicle from Green Bay was faster but broke down before completing the race. The Oshkosh finished the 323 km (201 mi) course in 33 hours and 27 minutes and posted an average speed of 9.7 km/h (6 mph). In 1879, the legislature awarded half the prize.

==== 20th century ====
Pre-WWII

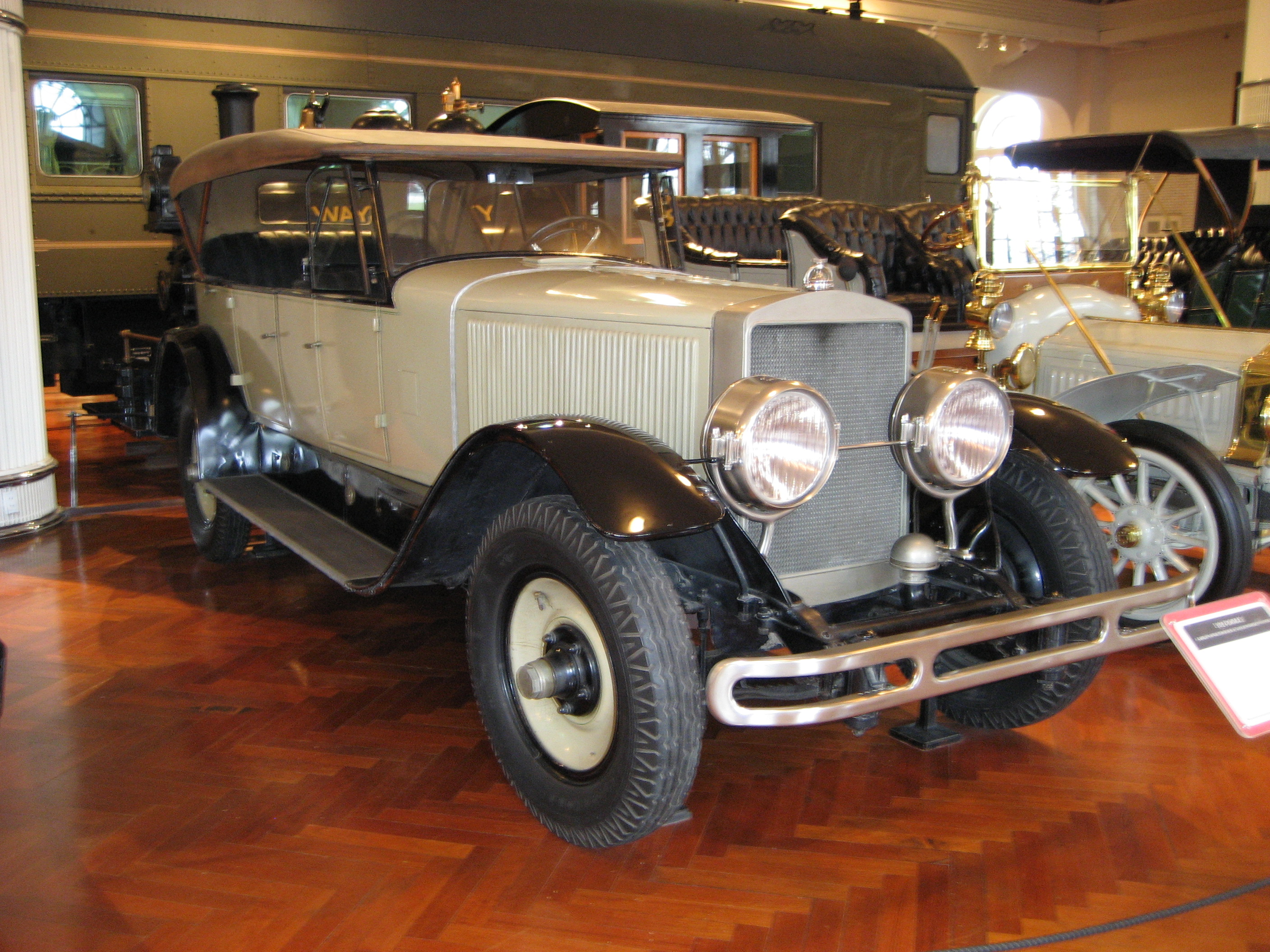
1924 Doble Model E

Steam-powered road vehicles, both cars and wagons, reached the peak of their development in the early 1930s with fast-steaming lightweight boilers and efficient engine designs. Internal combustion engines also developed considerably during World War I, becoming easier to operate and more reliable. The development of the high-speed diesel engine from 1930 began to replace them for wagons, accelerated in the UK by tax changes making steam wagons uneconomic overnight. Although a few designers continued to advocate steam power, no significant developments in the production of steam cars took place after Doble in 1931.

Post-WWII

Whether steam cars will ever be reborn in later technological eras remains to be seen. Magazines such as Light Steam Power continued to describe them into the 1980s. The 1950s saw interest in steam-turbine cars powered by small nuclear reactors (this was also true of aircraft). Still, the fears about the dangers inherent in nuclear fission technology soon killed these ideas.

=== Electric automobiles ===
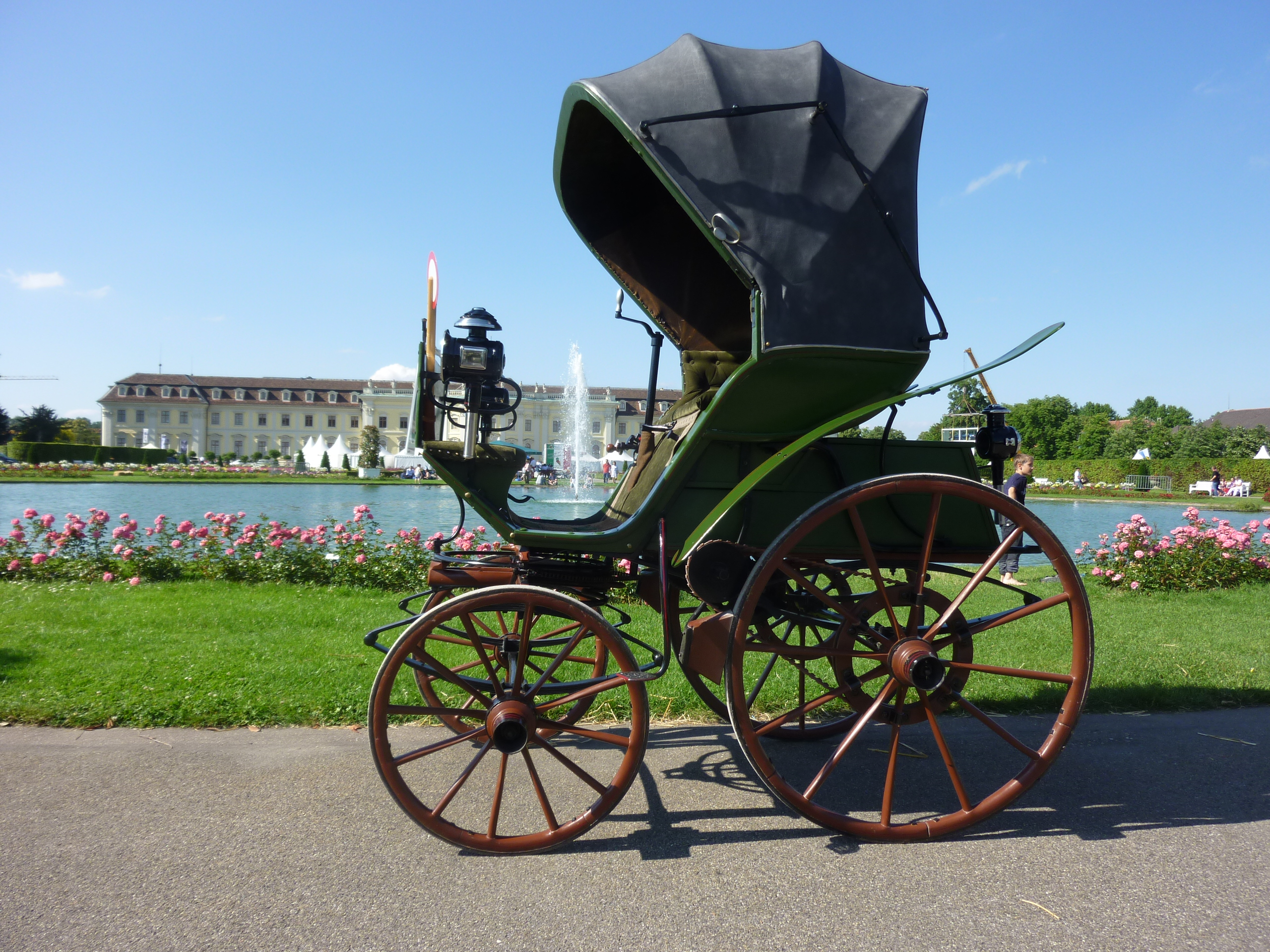
The German Flocken Elektrowagen of 1888, perhaps the first electric car in the world

==== 19th century ====
In 1828, Ányos Jedlik, a Hungarian who invented an early electric motor, constructed a tiny model car powered by his new motor. In 1834, Vermont blacksmith Thomas Davenport, the inventor of the first American DC electric motor, installed his motor in a small model car, which he operated on a short circular electrified track. In 1835, Professor Sibrandus Stratingh of Groningen, the Netherlands and his assistant Christopher Becker created a small-scale electrical car, powered by non-rechargeable primary cells. In 1838, Scotsman Robert Davidson built an electric locomotive that attained a speed of 6.4 km/h (4 mph). In England, a patent was granted in 1840 for using tracks as conductors of electric current, and similar American patents were issued to Lilley and Colten in 1847.

Sources point to different creations, such as the first electric car. Between 1832 and 1839 (the exact year is uncertain), Robert Anderson of Scotland invented a crude electric carriage powered by non-rechargeable primary cells. In November 1881, French inventor Gustave Trouvé demonstrated a working three-wheeled car powered by electricity at the International Exposition of Electricity. English inventor Thomas Parker, who was responsible for innovations such as electrifying the London Underground, overhead tramways in Liverpool and Birmingham, and the smokeless fuel coalite, built an electric car in London in 1884, using his own specially designed high-capacity rechargeable batteries. However, some others regard the Flocken Elektrowagen of 1888 by German inventor Andreas Flocken as the first actual electric car.

==== 20th century ====
Electric cars enjoyed popularity between the late 19th century and the early 20th century when electricity was among the preferred methods for automobile propulsion. Advances in internal combustion technology, especially the electric starter, soon rendered this advantage moot; the greater range of gasoline cars, quicker refueling times, and growing petroleum infrastructure, along with the mass production of gasoline vehicles by companies such as the Ford Motor Company, which reduced prices of gasoline cars to less than half that of equivalent electric cars, led to a decline in the use of electric propulsion, effectively removing it from markets such as the US by the 1930s.

==== 21st century ====
Percentage-of-total-sales figures for electric, plug-in hybrid, and hybrid vehicles approximately quadrupled from 2020 to 2026.

Increased concerns over the environmental impact of gasoline cars, higher gasoline prices, improvements in battery technology, and the prospect of peak oil have brought about renewed interest in electric cars, which are perceived to be more environmentally friendly and cheaper to maintain and run, despite high initial costs.

=== Internal combustion engines ===
==== Gas mixtures ====
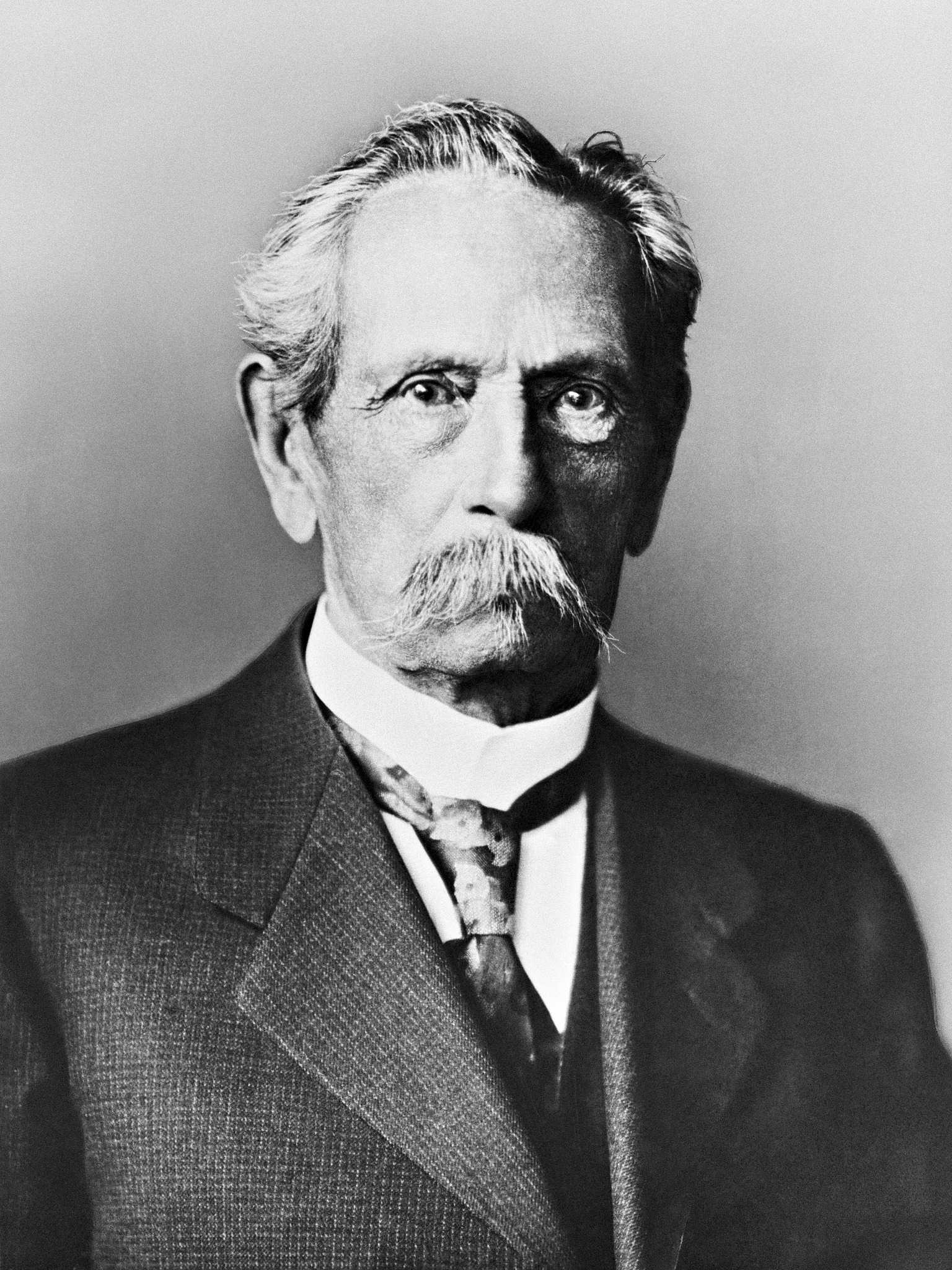
Carl Benz, creator of the Benz Patent-Motorwagen, considered by many as the first modern car.

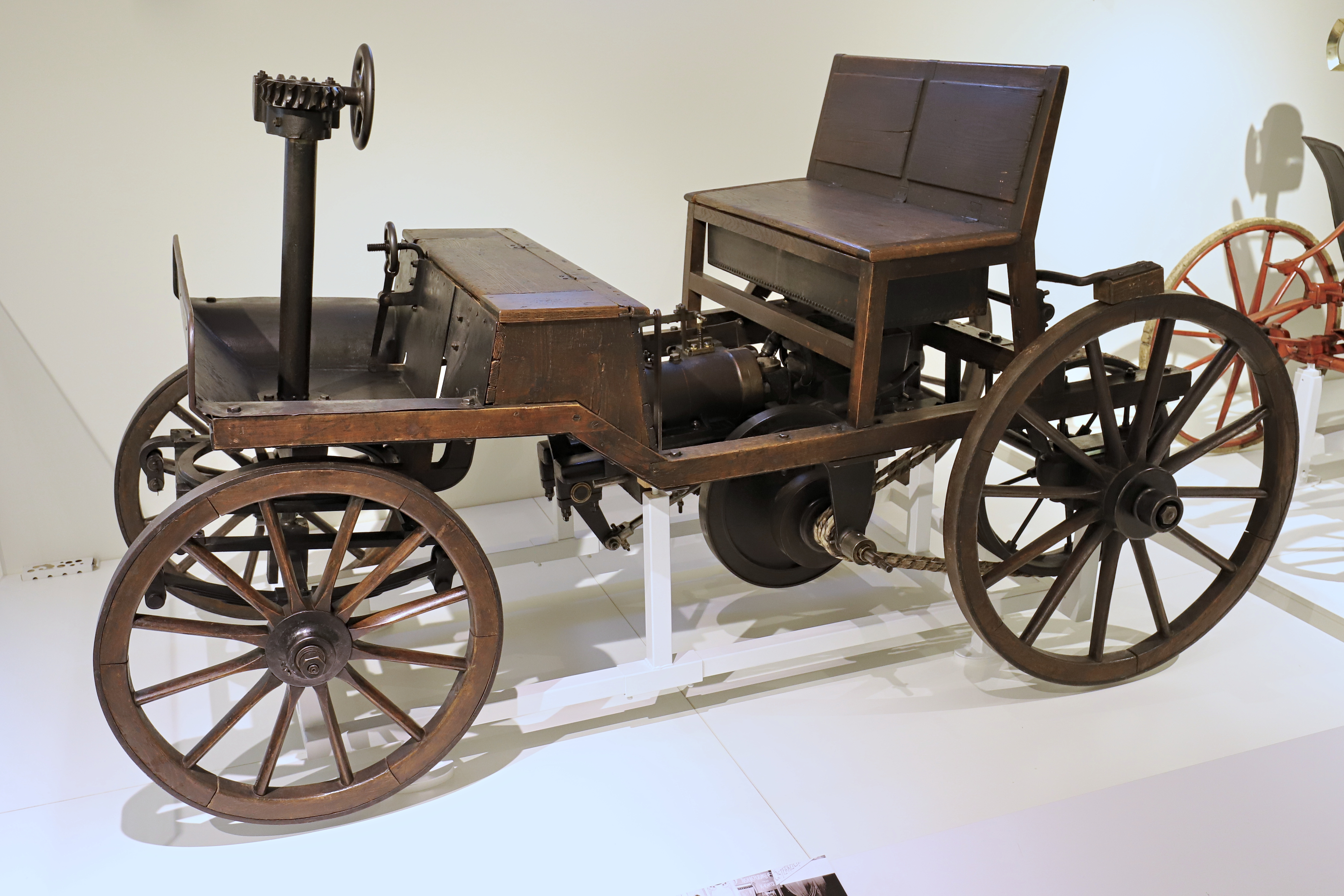
The second Marcus car of 1888

The lack of suitable fuels, particularly liquids, hampered early attempts at making and using internal combustion engines—therefore, some of the earliest engines used gas mixtures. In 1806, the Swiss engineer François Isaac de Rivaz built an engine powered by internal combustion of a hydrogen and oxygen mixture.

In 1826, Englishman Samuel Brown tested his hydrogen-fueled internal combustion engine by using it to propel a vehicle up Shooter's Hill in southeast London. Etienne Lenoir's automobile with a hydrogen-gas-fueled one-cylinder internal combustion engine (Hippomobile) made a test drive from Paris to Joinville-le-Pont in 1860, covering some 9 km (5.6 mi) in about three hours. A later version was propelled by coal gas. A Delamare-Deboutteville vehicle was patented and trialed in 1884.

==== Gasoline ====
Nicolaus Otto and Eugen Langen had built a working engine in 1867. About 1870, in Vienna, Austria-Hungary, inventor Siegfried Marcus put a liquid-fueled internal combustion engine on a simple handcart which made him the first man to propel a vehicle using gasoline. Today, this is known as "the first Marcus car" but would be better described as a cart. His second car, built and run in 1875 according to some sources, was the first gasoline-driven car and is housed at the Vienna Technical Museum. However, the latest research shows that it was not built until 1888/89. In 1883, Marcus secured a German patent for a low-voltage ignition system of the magneto type; this was his only automotive patent. During his lifetime, he was honored by some as the originator of the motorcar, but the Nazis all but erased his place in history during World War II. Because Marcus was of Jewish descent, the Nazi propaganda office ordered his work to be destroyed, his name expunged from future textbooks, and his public memorials removed. John Nixon of the London Times in 1938 considered Marcus' development of the motor car to have been experimental, as opposed to Carl Benz who took the concept from experimental to production. Nixon described Marcus' cars as impractical.

Benz built his first prototype car, the Benz Patent Motorcar, in 1885 in Mannheim. He patented it in January 1886, and by June 1886, he was driving around Mannheim in a second vehicle, the Benz Patent-Motorwagen Nr. 2, which had brakes. His first production car was the Benz Patent-Motorwagen Model 2, which went into series production in 1887. The Patent-Motorwagen is considered by many to be the first modern car—a practical, marketable automobile for everyday use—and the first in series production. His wife, Bertha Benz, proved—with the first long-distance trip in August 1888, from Mannheim to Pforzheim and back—that the motor car was capable of extended travel. Since 2008, a Bertha Benz Memorial Route commemorates this event.

Soon after, Gottlieb Daimler and Wilhelm Maybach in Stuttgart in 1889 designed a vehicle from scratch to be an automobile, rather than a horse-drawn carriage fitted with an engine. They also are usually credited with inventing the first motorcycle in 1885.

In 1891, John William Lambert built a three-wheeler in Ohio City, Ohio, which was destroyed in a fire the same year, while Henry Nadig constructed a four-wheeler in Allentown, Pennsylvania.

The first four-wheeled gasoline-driven automobile in the United Kingdom was built in Walthamstow by Frederick Bremer in 1892. Another was made in Birmingham in 1895 by Frederick William Lanchester, who also patented the disc brake. The first electric starter was installed on an Arnold, an adaptation of the Benz Velo, built in Kent between 1895 and 1898.

George Foote Foss of Sherbrooke, Quebec, built a single-cylinder gasoline car in 1896, which he drove for four years, ignoring city officials' warnings of arrest for his "mad antics".

== Eras of invention ==
=== Horseless carriage or veteran era ===
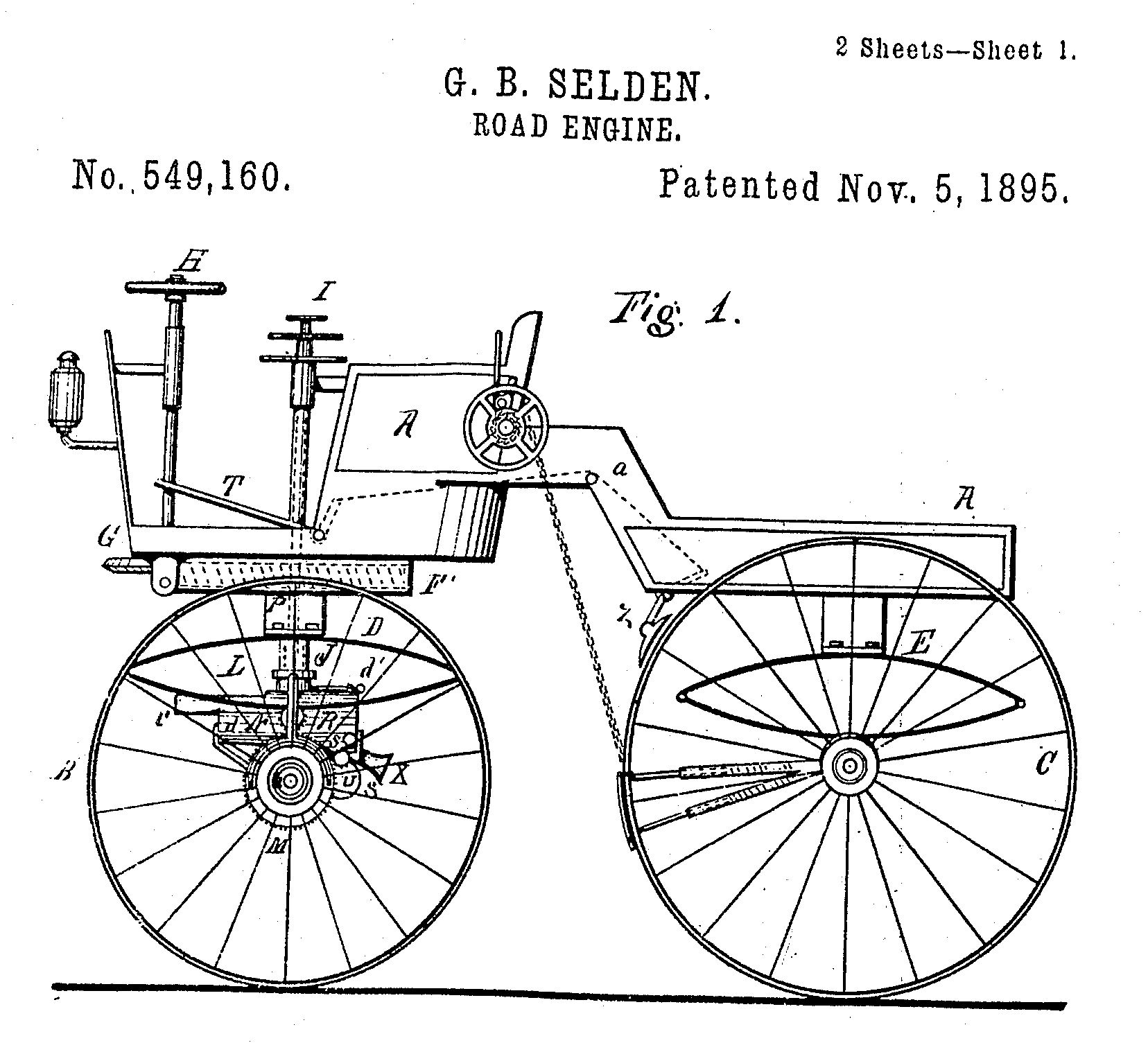
The Selden Road-Engine

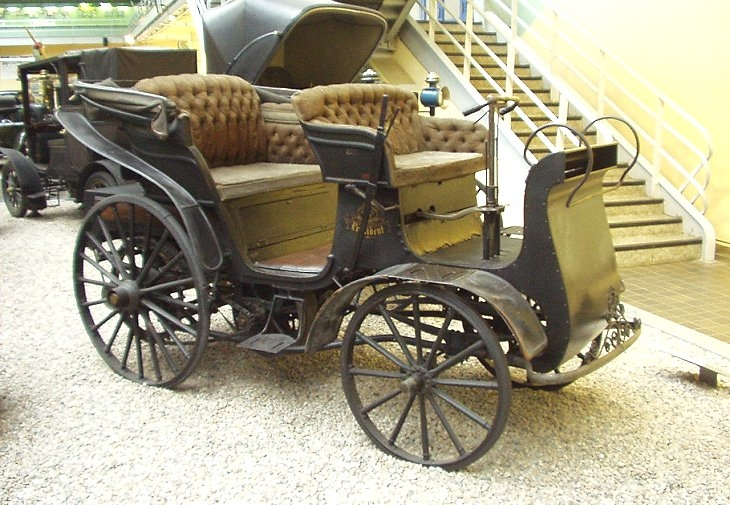
The Präsident automobile

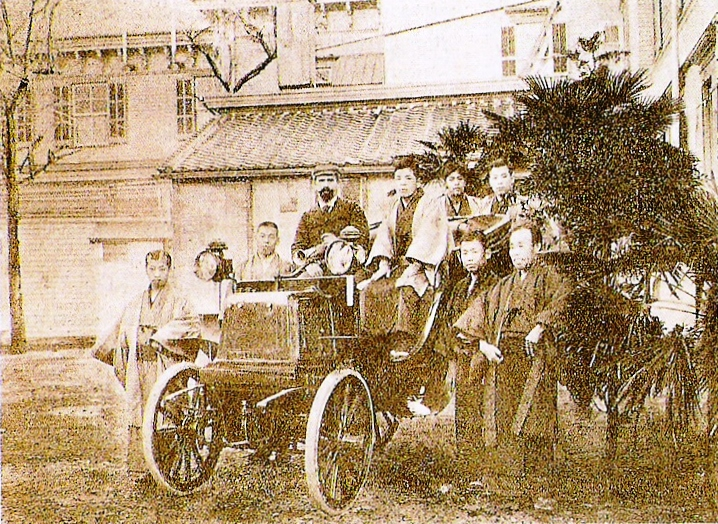
The first automobile in Japan, a French Panhard-Levassor, in 1898

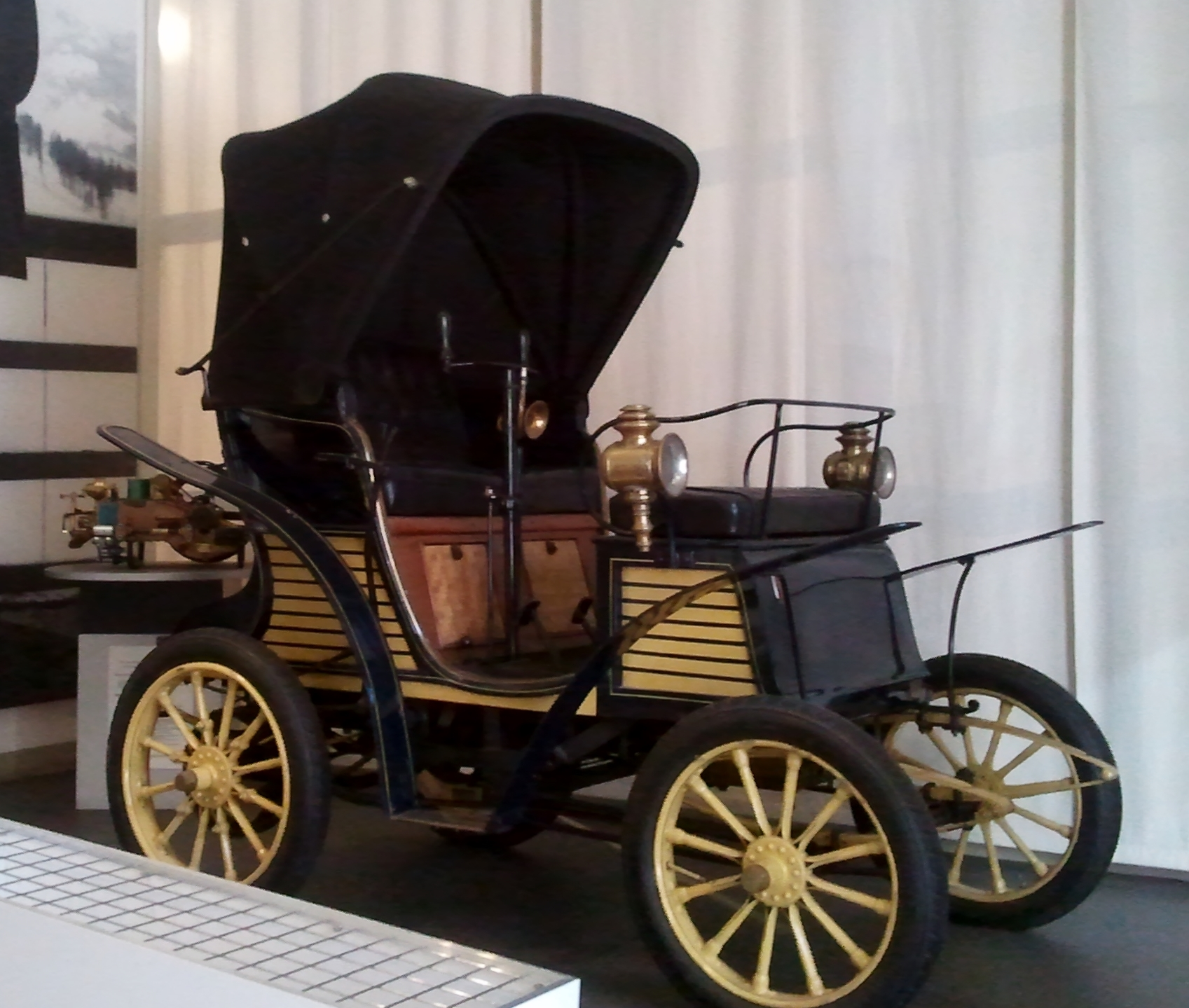
Fiat 4 HP, the first car model produced by Italian manufacturer Fiat in 1899

The American George B. Selden filed for a patent on 8 May 1879. His application included the engine and its use in a four-wheeled car. Selden filed a series of amendments to his application, which stretched out the legal process, resulting in a delay of 16 years before the patent was granted on 5 November 1895. Selden licensed his patent to most major American automakers, collecting a fee on each car they produced and creating the Association of Licensed Automobile Manufacturers. The Ford Motor Company fought this patent in court, and eventually won on appeal. Henry Ford testified that the patent did more to hinder than encourage development of autos in the United States.

The first automobiles were produced by Carl Benz in 1888 in Germany and, under license from Benz, in France by Emile Roger. There were numerous others, including tricycle builders Rudolf Egg, Edward Butler, and Léon Bollée. Bollée, using a 650 cc (40 cu in) engine of his own design, enabled his driver, Jamin, to average 45 km/h (28 mph) in the 1897 Paris-Tourville race. By 1900, mass production of automobiles had begun in France and the United States.

The first company formed exclusively to build automobiles was Panhard et Levassor in France, which is also credited for introducing the first four-cylinder engine. Formed in 1889, Panhard was followed by Peugeot two years later. By the start of the 20th century, the automobile industry began taking off in Western Europe, especially in France, where 30,204 were produced in 1903, representing 48.8 percent of world automobile production that year.

Across the northern US, local mechanics experimented with various prototypes. In Iowa, for example, by 1890, Jesse O. Wells drove a steam-powered Locomobile. There were numerous experiments in electric vehicles driven by storage batteries. The first users ordered the early gasoline-powered cars, including Haynes, Mason, and Duesenberg automobiles. Blacksmiths and mechanics started operating repair and gasoline stations. In Springfield, Massachusetts, brothers Charles and Frank Duryea founded the Duryea Motor Wagon Company in 1893, becoming the first American automobile manufacturing company. The Autocar Company, founded in 1897, established many innovations still in use and remains the oldest operating motor vehicle manufacturer in the US. However, it was Ransom E. Olds and his Olds Motor Vehicle Company (later known as Oldsmobile) who would dominate this era with the introduction of the Oldsmobile Curved Dash. Its production line was running in 1901. The Thomas B. Jeffery Company developed the world's second mass-produced automobile, and 1,500 Ramblers were built and sold in its first year, representing one-sixth of all existing motorcars in the US at the time. Within a year, Cadillac (formed from the Henry Ford Company), Winton, and Ford were also producing cars in the thousands. In South Bend, Indiana, the Studebaker brothers, having become the world's leading manufacturers of horse-drawn vehicles, made a transition to electric automobiles in 1902, and gasoline engines in 1904. They continued to build horse-drawn vehicles until 1919.

The first motor car in Central Europe was produced by the Austro-Hungarian company Nesselsdorfer Wagenbau (later renamed to Tatra in today's Czech Republic) in 1897, the Präsident automobile. In 1898, Louis Renault had a De Dion-Bouton modified, with fixed drive shaft and differential, making "perhaps the first hot rod in history" and bringing Renault and his brothers into the car industry. Innovation was rapid and rampant, with no clear standards for basic vehicle architectures, body styles, construction materials, or controls; for example, many veteran cars use a tiller, rather than a wheel for steering. During 1903, Rambler standardized on the steering wheel and moved the driver's position to the left-hand side of the vehicle. Chain drive was dominant over the drive shaft, and closed bodies were scarce. Drum brakes were introduced by Renault in 1902. The next year, Dutch designer Jacobus Spijker built the first four-wheel drive racing car; it never competed. It would be 1965 and the Jensen FF before four-wheel drive was used on a production car.

By 1900, the early centers of national automotive industry developed in many countries, including Belgium (home to Vincke, that copied Benz; Germain, a pseudo-Panhard; and Linon and Nagant, both based on the Gobron-Brillié), Switzerland (led by Fritz Henriod, Rudolf Egg, Saurer, Johann Weber, and Lorenz Popp), Vagnfabrik AB in Sweden, Hammel (by A. F. Hammel and H. U. Johansen at Copenhagen, in Denmark, which only built one car, ca. 1886), Irgens (starting in Bergen, Norway, in 1883, but without success), Italy (where FIAT started in 1899), and as far afield as Australia (where Pioneer set up shop in 1898, with an already archaic paraffin-fueled center-pivot-steered wagon). Meanwhile, the export trade had begun, with Koch exporting cars and trucks from Paris to Tunisia, Egypt, Iran, and the Dutch East Indies. Motor cars were also exported to British colonies. For example, the first was shipped to India in 1897.

Within a few years, hundreds of producers across the Western world were using many automotive technologies. Steam, electricity, and gasoline-powered automobiles competed for decades, with each type of propulsion having specific advantages and disadvantages. In the year 1900, 4,192 automobiles from 75 manufacturers were produced in the United States, with 1,681 (40%) of them being steam-powered vehicles, 1,575 (36%) electric vehicles, and 936 (22%) gasoline-powered vehicles. Dual- and even quad-engine cars were designed, and engine displacement ranged to more than 12 L (730 cu in). Many modern advances, including gas/electric hybrids, multi-valve engines, overhead camshafts, and four-wheel drive, were attempted and discarded at this time.

Innovation was not limited to the vehicles themselves. Increasing numbers of cars propelled the growth of the petroleum industry, as well as the development of technology to produce gasoline (replacing kerosene and coal oil) and of improvements in heat-tolerant mineral oil lubricants (replacing vegetable and animal oils).

There were social effects, too. Music would be made about cars, such as "In My Merry Oldsmobile" (a tradition that continues in several genres). At the same time, in 1896, William Jennings Bryan would be the first presidential candidate to campaign in a car (a donated Mueller), in Decatur, Illinois. Three years later, Jacob German would start a tradition for New York City cabdrivers when he sped down Lexington Avenue, at the "reckless" speed of 19 km/h (12 mph). Also in 1899, Akron, Ohio, adopted the first self-propelled paddy wagon. On 22 July 1894, the Paris–Rouen motor race, which is sometimes described as the world's first competitive motor race, took place.

Throughout the veteran car era, the automobile was seen more as a novelty than a genuinely useful device. Breakdowns were frequent, fuel was difficult to obtain, roads suitable for traveling were scarce, and rapid innovation meant that a year-old car was nearly worthless. Significant breakthroughs in proving the usefulness of the automobile came in 1888 with the historic long-distance drive of Bertha Benz, the wife of Carl Benz, when she traveled more than 80 km (50 mi) from Mannheim to Pforzheim, to make people aware of the potential of the vehicles her husband manufactured, and in 1903 after Horatio Nelson Jackson's successful transcontinental drive across the US on a Winton car.

=== Brass/Edwardian era ===
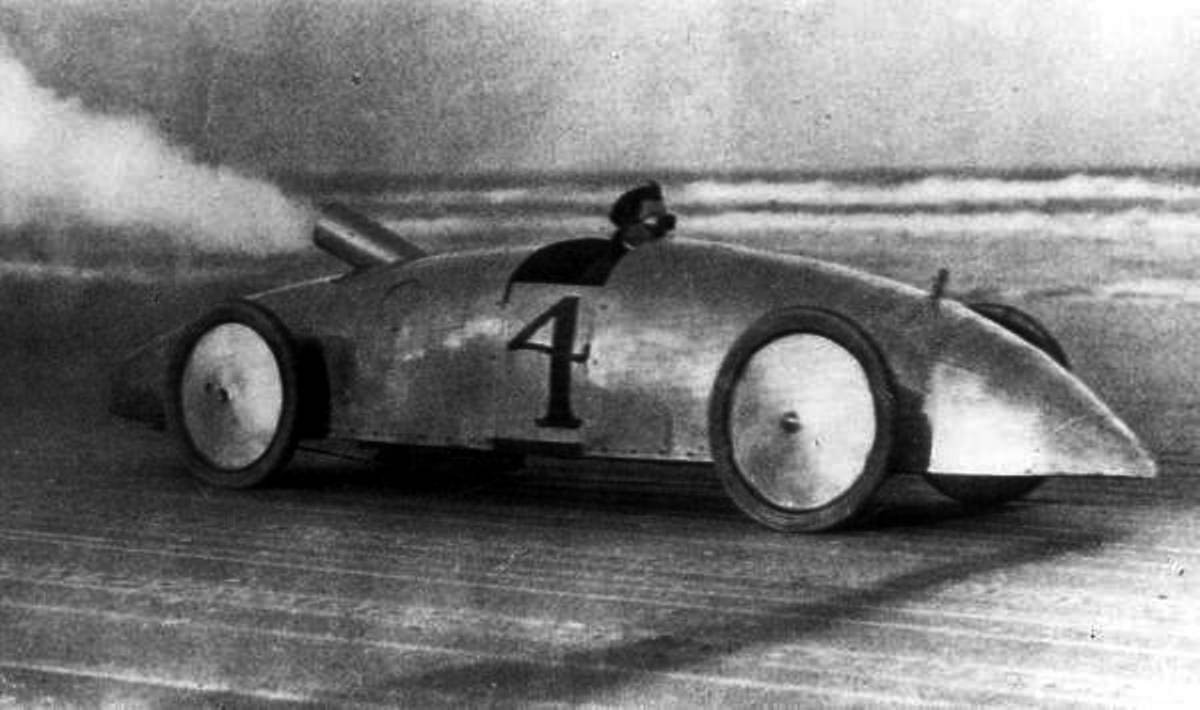
A Stanley Steamer racecar in 1903. In 1906, a similar Stanley Rocket set the world land speed record at 205.5 km/h (127.7 mph) at Daytona Beach Road Course.

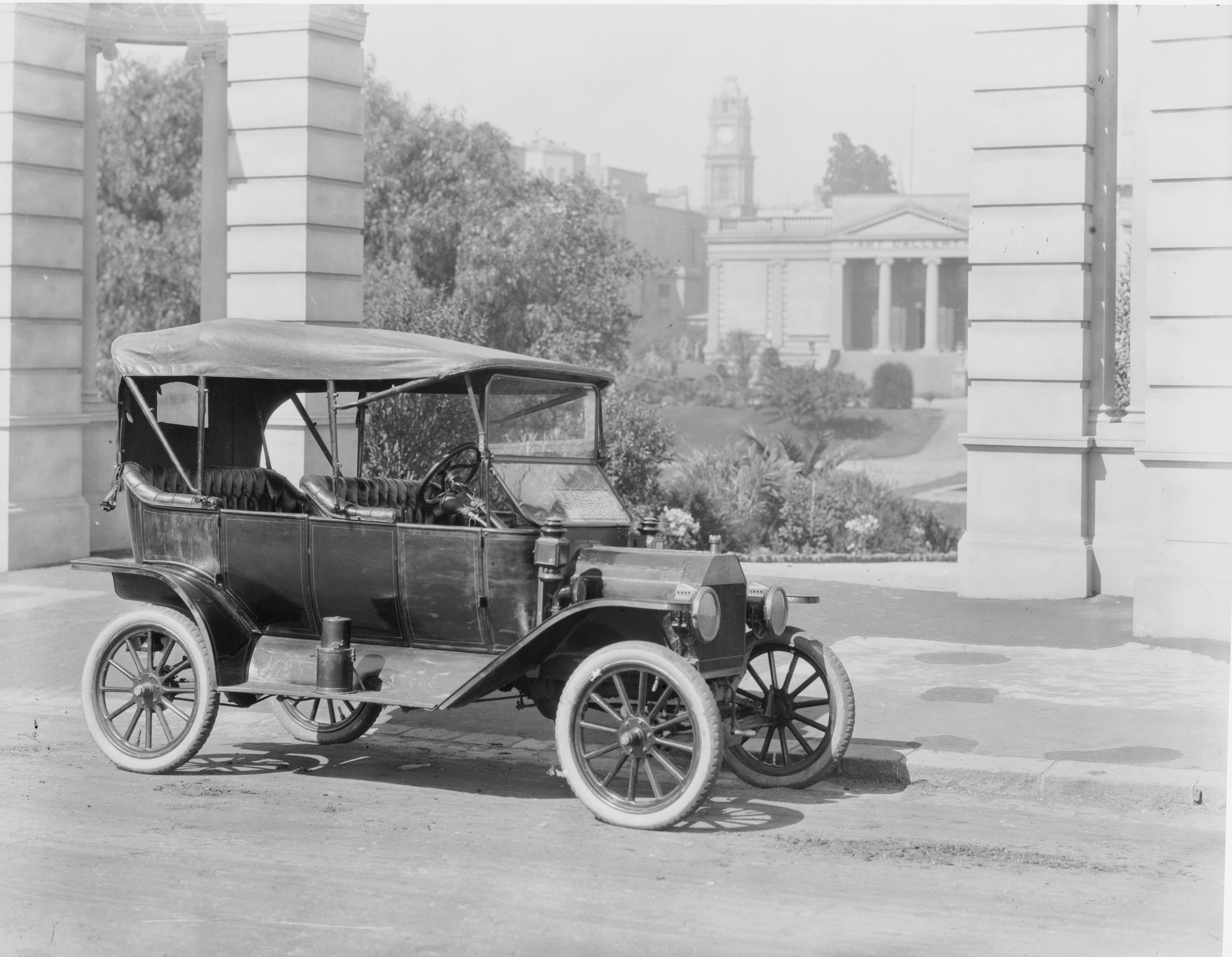
Model-T Ford car parked near the Geelong Art Gallery at its launch in Australia in 1915

The Brass or Edwardian period lasted from roughly 1905 through 1914 and the beginning of World War I. It is generally referred to as the Edwardian era, but in the United States, it is often known as the Brass era from the widespread use of brass in vehicles during this time.

Within the 15 years that make up this era, the various experimental designs and alternate power systems would be marginalized. Although the modern touring car had been invented earlier, it was not until Panhard et Levassor's Système Panhard was widely licensed and adopted that recognizable and standardized automobiles were created. This system specified front-engine, rear-wheel drive, internal combustion engine cars with a sliding gear transmission. Traditional coach-style vehicles were rapidly abandoned, and buckboard runabouts lost favor with the introduction of tonneaus and other less-expensive touring bodies.

While steam-powered, electric, and gasoline-powered automobiles coexisted and competed heavily around the turn of the century, gasoline-powered internal combustion engines eventually achieved dominance by the 1910s. Rapid technical advances in engine design and improved fuel efficiency made gasoline-powered cars cheaper and easier to operate than steam-powered cars, and they were able to drive at higher speeds and had longer range than electric vehicles of the time. In 1908, the Ford Motor Company started production of the gasoline-powered Ford Model T, which later became the first mass-affordable automobile. The first effective electric engine starter, devised by Charles F. Kettering in 1911, replaced crank mechanisms, which required physical strength and had been notorious for causing injury. This made gasoline-powered cars easy for anyone to start and further cemented their popularity. By 1917, approximately 3.5 million automobiles were registered in the United States, over 98% of which were gasoline-powered, while steam and electric cars almost completely vanished from the market.

Throughout this era, the development of automotive technology was rapid, partly due to hundreds of small manufacturers competing to gain the world's attention. Key developments included the electric ignition system, independent suspension, and four-wheel brakes. Leaf springs were widely used for suspension, though many other systems were still in use, with angle steel taking over from armored wood as the frame material of choice. Transmissions and throttle controls were widely adopted, allowing a variety of cruising speeds. However, vehicles generally still had discrete speed settings, rather than the infinitely variable system familiar in cars of later eras. Safety glass also debuted and was patented by John Crewe Wood in England in 1905. (It would not become standard equipment until 1926, on a Rickenbacker.)

Between 1907 and 1912 in the United States, the high-wheel motor buggy (resembling the horse buggy of before 1900) was in its heyday, with over 75 makers including Holsman (Chicago), IHC (Chicago), and Sears (which sold via catalog); the high-wheeler would be killed by the Model T. In 1912, Hupp (in the US, supplied by Hale & Irwin) and BSA (in the UK) pioneered the use of all-steel bodies, joined in 1914 by Dodge (who produced Model T bodies). While it would be another two decades before all-steel bodies would be standard, the change would mean improved supplies of superior-quality wood for furniture makers.

The 1908 New York to Paris Race was the world's first circumnavigation by automobile. German, French, Italian, and American teams began in New York City on 12 February 1908, with three competitors ultimately reaching Paris. The US-built Thomas Flyer with George Schuster won the race covering 35,000 km (22,000 mi) in 169 days. Also in 1908, the first South American automobile was built in Peru, the Grieve. In 1909, Rambler became the first car company to equip its cars with a spare tire that was mounted on a fifth wheel.

In the early 20th century, automobiles started to replace horse-drawn carts and carriages as a means of personal transportation in the Western world, but this development was also met with skepticism and resistance. The resistance had economic roots, as the industry built around donkeys, horses, horse feed, and the manufacturing and maintenance of carriages collapsed with the advent of the motorized automobile. However, the presence of the automobile also sparked social conflicts: Early car owners dominated the roads with their loud and fast vehicles, they were perceived as arrogant and aggressive by pedestrians. Automobiles kicked up massive clouds of dust on unpaved dirt and gravel roads, hindering pedestrians, and their loud noise frightened horses and livestock. Resistance against the car was further fueled by the numerous accidents involving automobiles and pedestrians, with a high number of pedestrian fatalities. Legislators addressed these conflicts by passing numerous laws, which varied internationally, that restricted the use of cars, imposed speed limits and mandated vehicle registrations and licensing for drivers, among other things. Examples include the Motor Car Act 1903 in the United Kingdom and the Act Regulating the Speed of Motor Vehicles (1901) in Connecticut, which was the first speed limit law in the United States. In some places, cars were banned completely, such as the Canadian province of Prince Edward Island, where driving cars was prohibited from 1908 to 1919 (Prince Edward Island automobile ban), or the Swiss canton of Grisons, where a ban was in place from 1900 to 1925 (Grisons automobile ban).

Some examples of cars of the period included:

- 1907 Takuri—the first entirely Japanese-made gasoline engine car produced by Komanosuke Uchiyama in April 1907. Also, in Japan, the Hatsudoki Seizo Co. Ltd. is formed, which was later renamed in 1951 as Daihatsu Kōgyō Kabushiki-gaisha.
- 1908–1927 Ford Model T—the era's most widely produced and available four-seater car. It used a planetary transmission and had a pedal-based control system. Ford T was proclaimed the most influential car of the 20th century in the international Car of the Century awards.
- 1909 Hudson Model 20—named after its rated power output and sold on its first market for US$900 (equivalent to $32,250 in 2025).
- 1909 Morgan Runabout—a popular cyclecar, cyclecars were sold in greater quantities than four-seater cars in this period.
- 1910 Mercer Raceabout—regarded as one of the first sports cars, the Raceabout expressed the exuberance of the driving public, as did the similarly conceived American Underslung and Hispano-Suiza Alphonso.
- 1910–1920 Bugatti Type 13—a notable racing and touring model with advanced engineering and design. Similar models were Types 15, 17, 22, and 23.
- 1914–1917 Dattogo—a two-cylinder, 10 hp (7,500 W) "all-Japanese" car manufactured in seven units by the Kaishinsha Motor Works operated by Masujiro Hashimoto in Tokyo, while importing, assembling, and selling British cars. Kaishinsha was the first automobile manufacturing business in Japan.
- 1917 Mitsubishi Model A—an all hand-built car built by Japanese company Mitsubishi in limited numbers for Japanese executives.

=== Vintage era ===
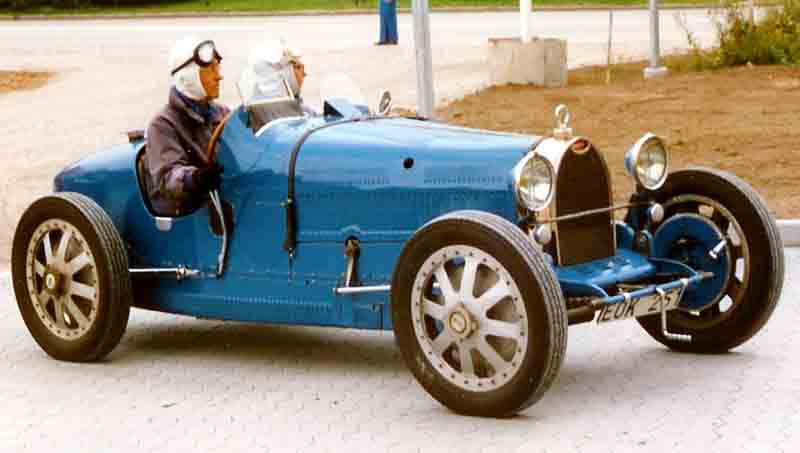
1926 Bugatti Type 35

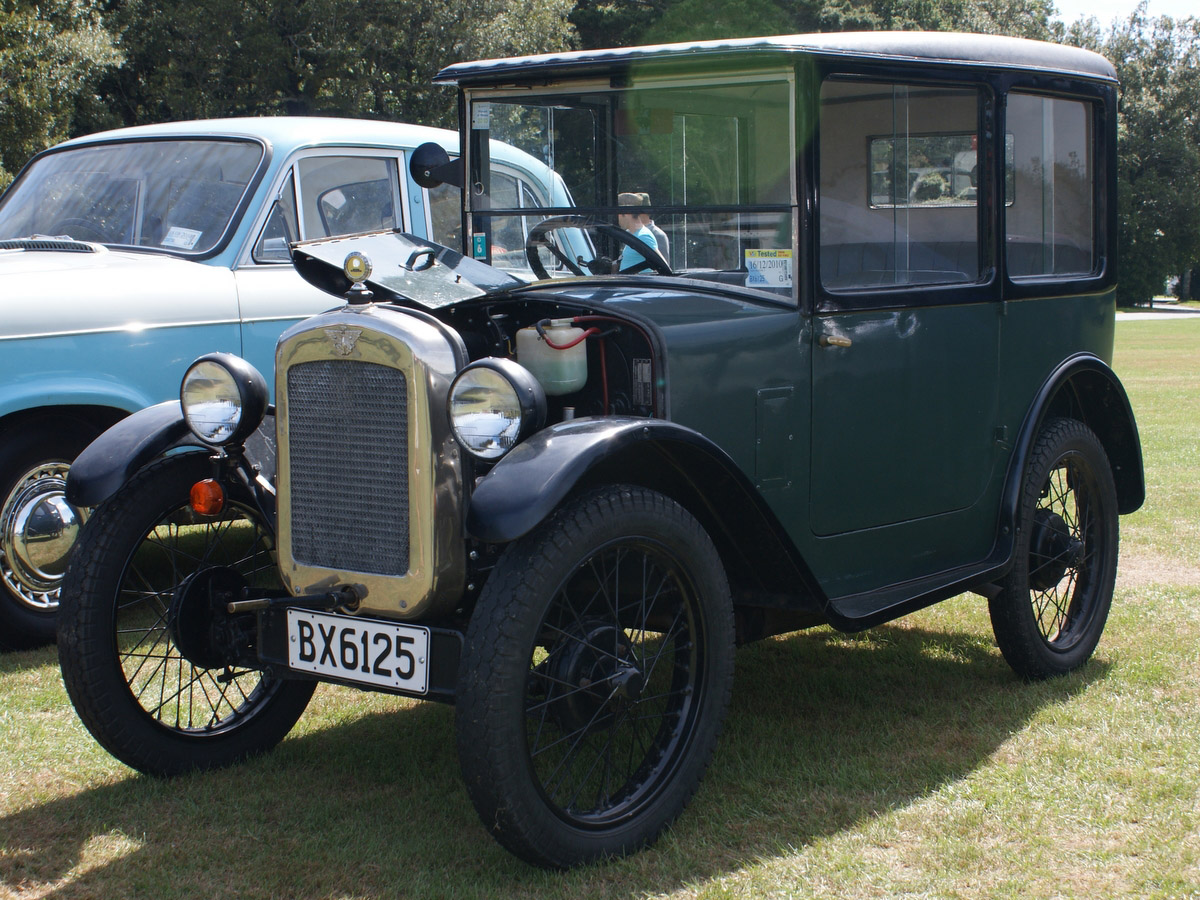
1929 Austin Seven

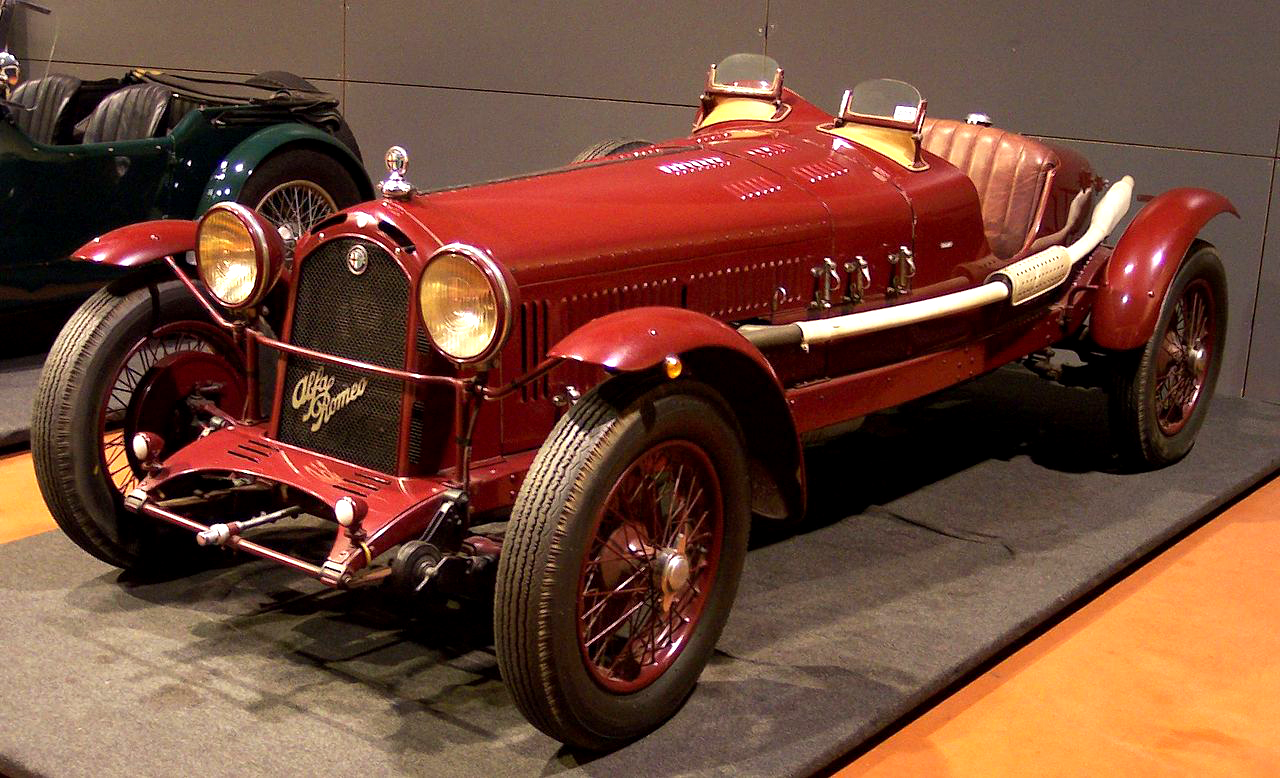
1929 Alfa Romeo 6C

The vintage era lasted from the end of World War I (1918) until the Wall Street crash at the end of 1929. During this period, the front-engine car layout dominated, with closed bodies and standardized controls becoming the norm. In 1919, 90 percent of cars sold were open; by 1929, 90 percent were closed. Development of the internal combustion engine continued at a rapid pace, with multivalve and overhead camshaft engines produced at the high end, and V8, V12, and even V16 engines conceived for the ultrarich. Also in 1919, hydraulic brakes were invented by Malcolm Loughead (cofounder of Lockheed); they were adopted by Duesenberg for their 1921 Model A. Three years later, Hermann Rieseler of Vulcan Motor invented the first automatic transmission, which had two-speed planetary gearbox, torque converter, and lockup clutch; it never entered production. (It would only become an available option in 1940.) Just at the end of the vintage era, tempered glass (now standard equipment in side windows) was invented in France. In this era, the pontoon design of cars without fully articulated fenders, running boards, and other non-compact ledge elements were introduced in small series. Still, mass production of cars with these features began after World War II.

American auto companies in the 1920s expected they would soon sell six million cars a year but did not do so until 1955. Numerous companies disappeared. Between 1922 and 1925, the number of US passenger car builders decreased from 175 to 70. H. A. Tarantous, managing editor of "MoToR Member Society of Automotive Engineers", in a New York Times article from 1925, suggested many were unable to raise production and cope with falling prices (due to assembly line production), especially for low-priced cars. The new pyroxylin-based paints, eight-cylinder engines, four-wheel brakes, and balloon tires were the biggest trends for 1925.

Examples of period vehicles:

- 1922–1939 Austin 7—a widely copied vehicle serving as a template for many cars such as BMW and Nissan.
- 1922–1931 Lancia Lambda—an advanced car for the time, was the first to feature a load-bearing monocoque and independent front suspension.
- 1924–1929 Bugatti Type 35—one of the most successful racing cars with over 1,000 victories in five years.
- 1925–1928 Hanomag 2/10 PS—early example of pontoon styling.
- 1927–1931 Ford Model A (1927–1931)—after keeping the brass-era Model T in production for too long, Ford broke from the past by restarting its model series with the 1927 Model A. More than four million were produced, making it the bestselling model of the era. The Ford Model A was a prototype for beginning Soviet mass car production (GAZ A).
- 1930 Cadillac V-16—developed at the height of the vintage era, the V16-powered Cadillac would join Bugatti's Royale as a legendary ultraluxury car of the era.

=== Pre-war era ===
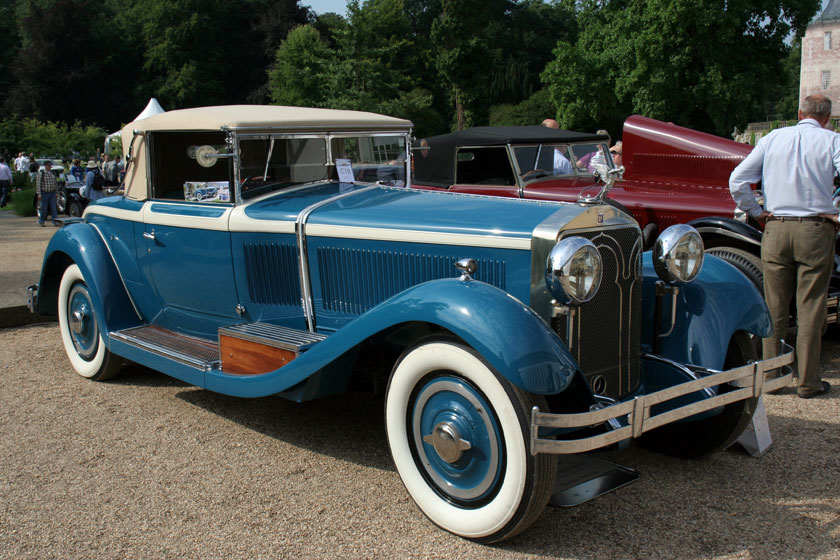
Isotta Fraschini Tipo 8A

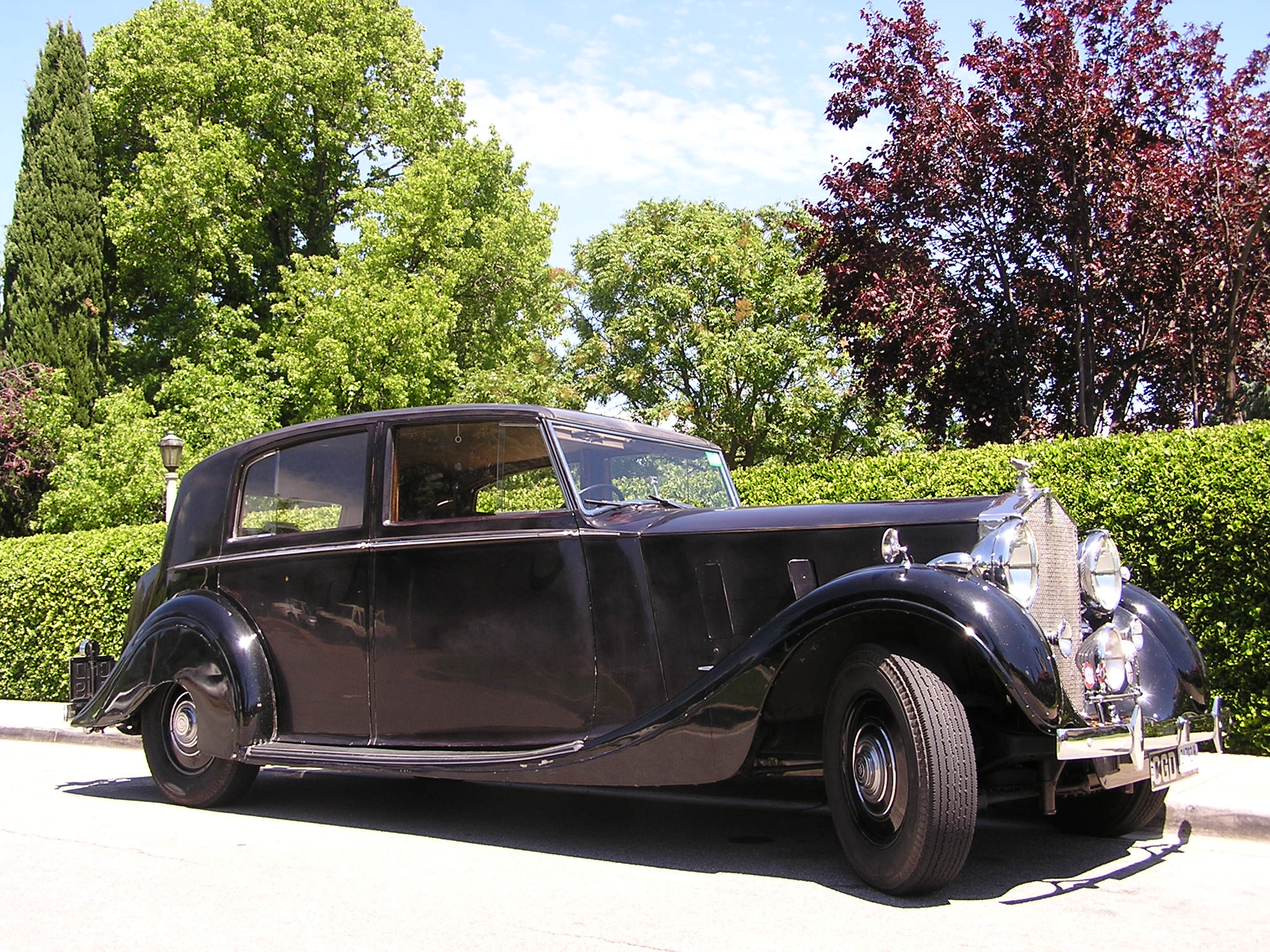
Rolls-Royce Phantom III

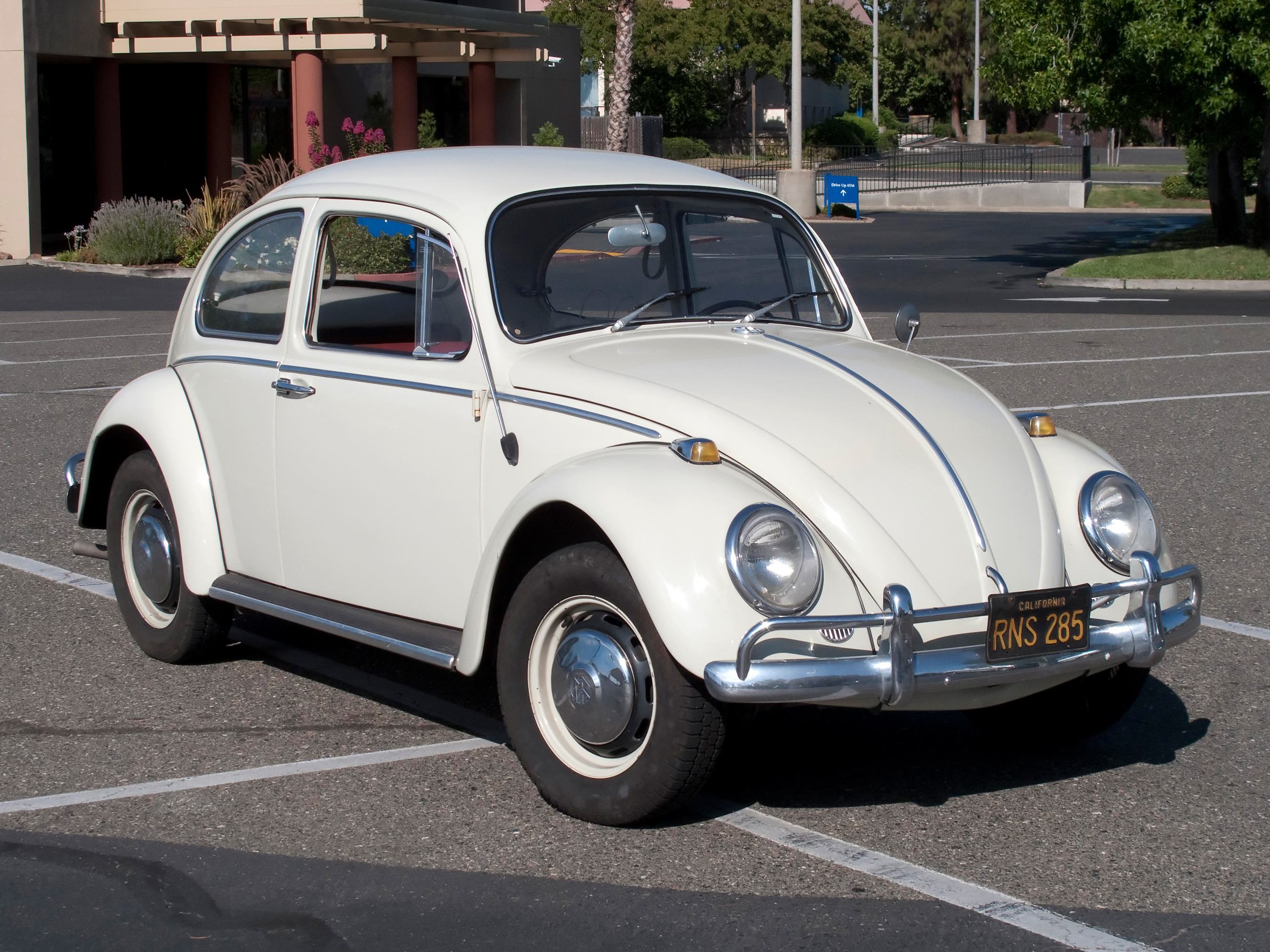
Volkswagen Beetle

The pre-war part of the classic era began with the Great Depression in 1930, and ended with the recovery after World War II, commonly placed during 1946. It was in this period that integrated fenders and fully closed bodies began to dominate sales, with the new saloon/sedan body style even incorporating a trunk or boot at the rear for storage. The old open-top runabouts, phaetons, and touring cars were largely phased out by the end of the classic era as wings, running boards, and headlights were gradually integrated with the body of the car.

By the 1930s, many of the mechanical technologies used in today's automobiles had been invented, although some ideas were later "re-invented" and credited to others. For example, front-wheel drive was re-introduced by André Citroën with the launch of the Traction Avant in 1934. However, cars with front-wheel drive were made several years earlier in road cars produced by Alvis and Cord as well as in racing cars by Miller (and may have appeared as early as 1897). In the same vein, the independent suspension was initially developed by Amédée Bollée in 1873, but not put in production until the low-volume Mercedes-Benz 380 in 1933, and later by other automakers using the design. In 1930, the number of auto manufacturers declined sharply as the industry consolidated and matured, thanks in part to the effects of the Great Depression.

Examples of pre-war automobiles:

- 1932–1948 Ford V-8 (Model B)—introduction of the flathead V8 in mainstream vehicles.
- 1934–1938 Tatra 77—early example of a car design that prioritized aerodynamics.
- 1934–1940 Bugatti Type 57—a refined automobile for the wealthy.
- 1934–1956 Citroën Traction Avant—first mass-produced front-wheel drive car, built with monocoque chassis.
- 1936–1955 MG T series—sports cars.
- 1938–2003 Volkswagen Beetle—a design that was produced for over 60 years with over 20 million units assembled in several countries.
- 1936–1939 Rolls-Royce Phantom III—V12 engine.

=== Postwar era ===
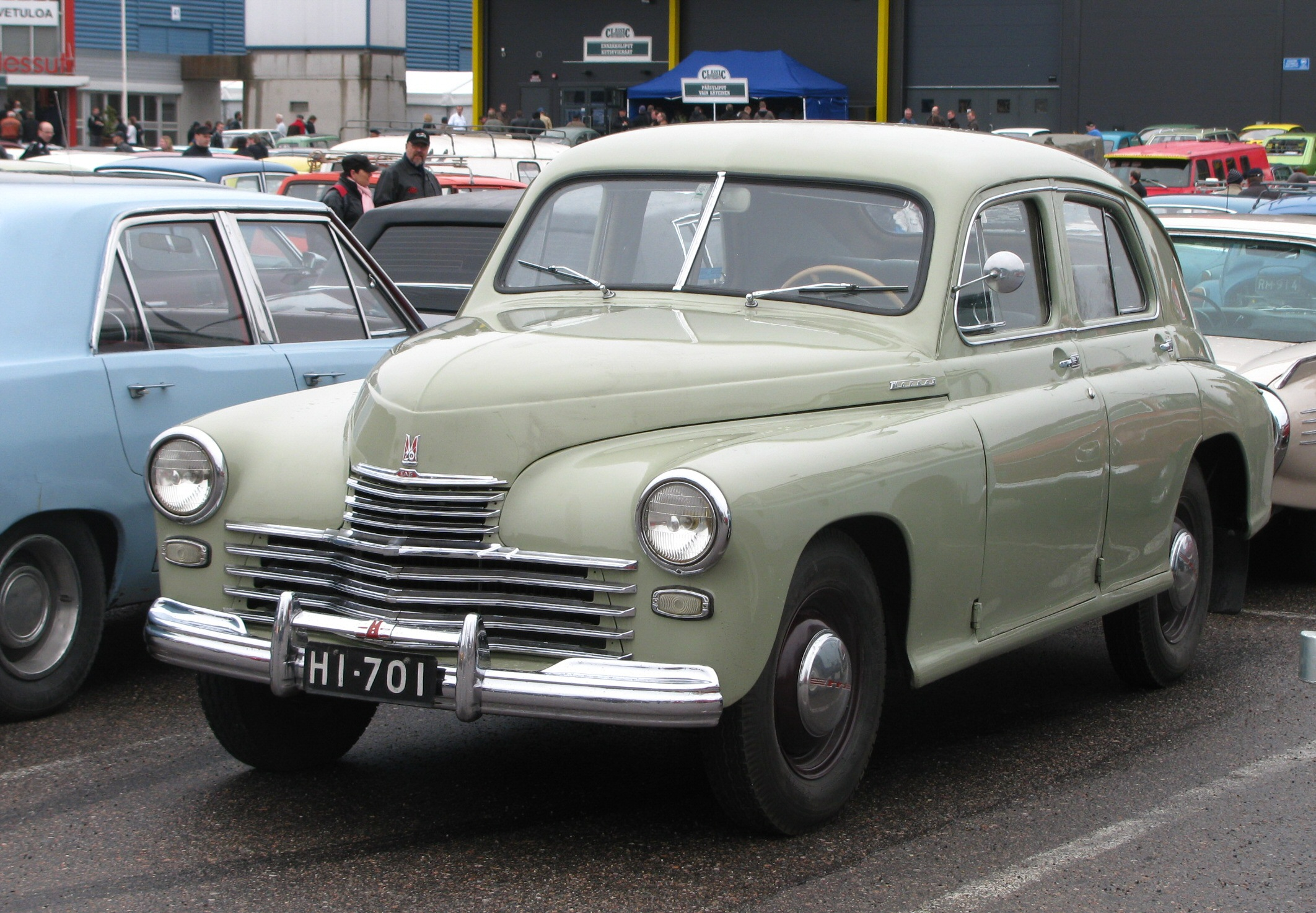
1946 GAZ-M20 Pobeda, one of the first mass-produced cars with a pontoon design

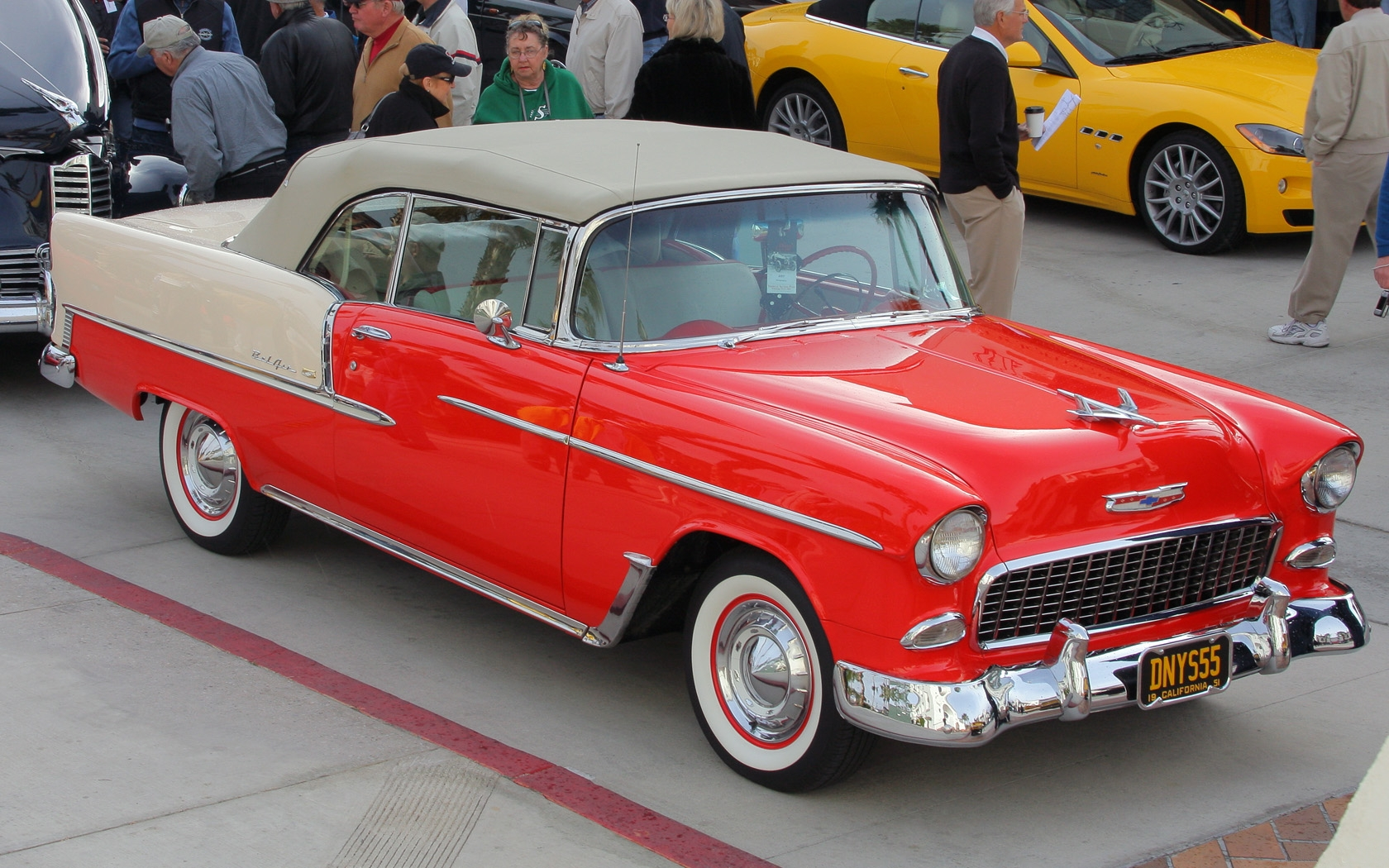
1955 Chevrolet Bel Air convertible

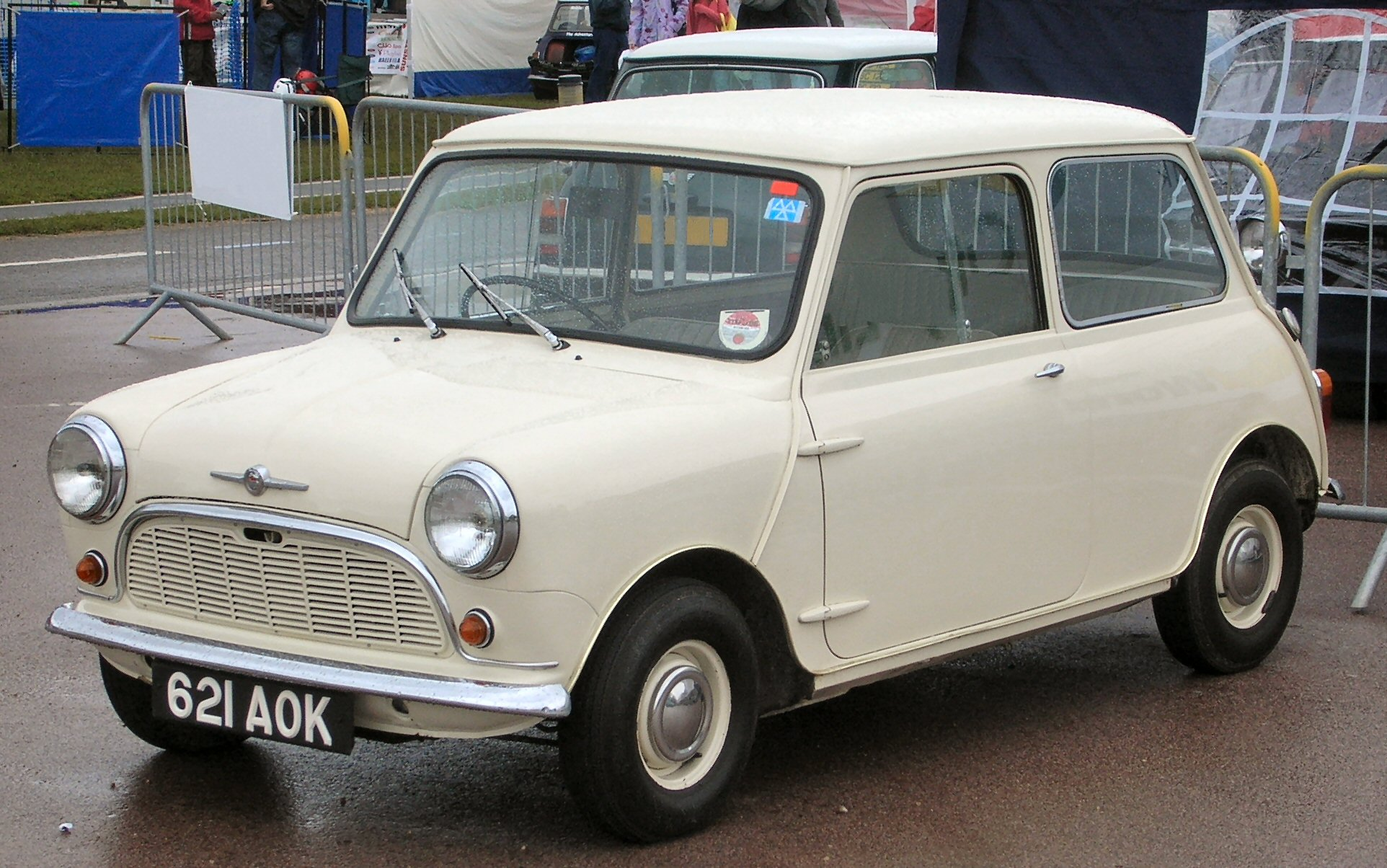
1959 Morris Mini-Minor

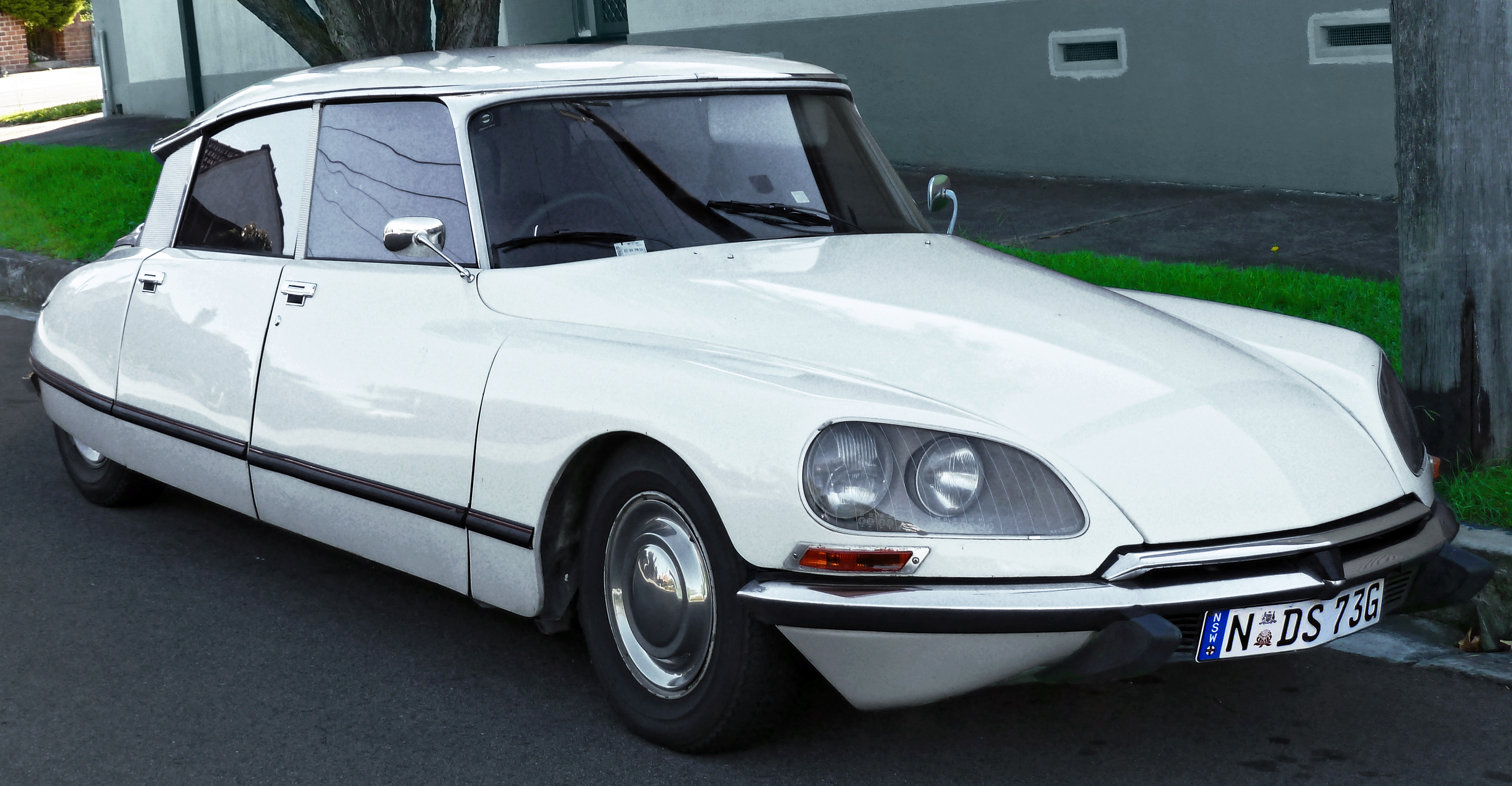
1974 Citroën DS

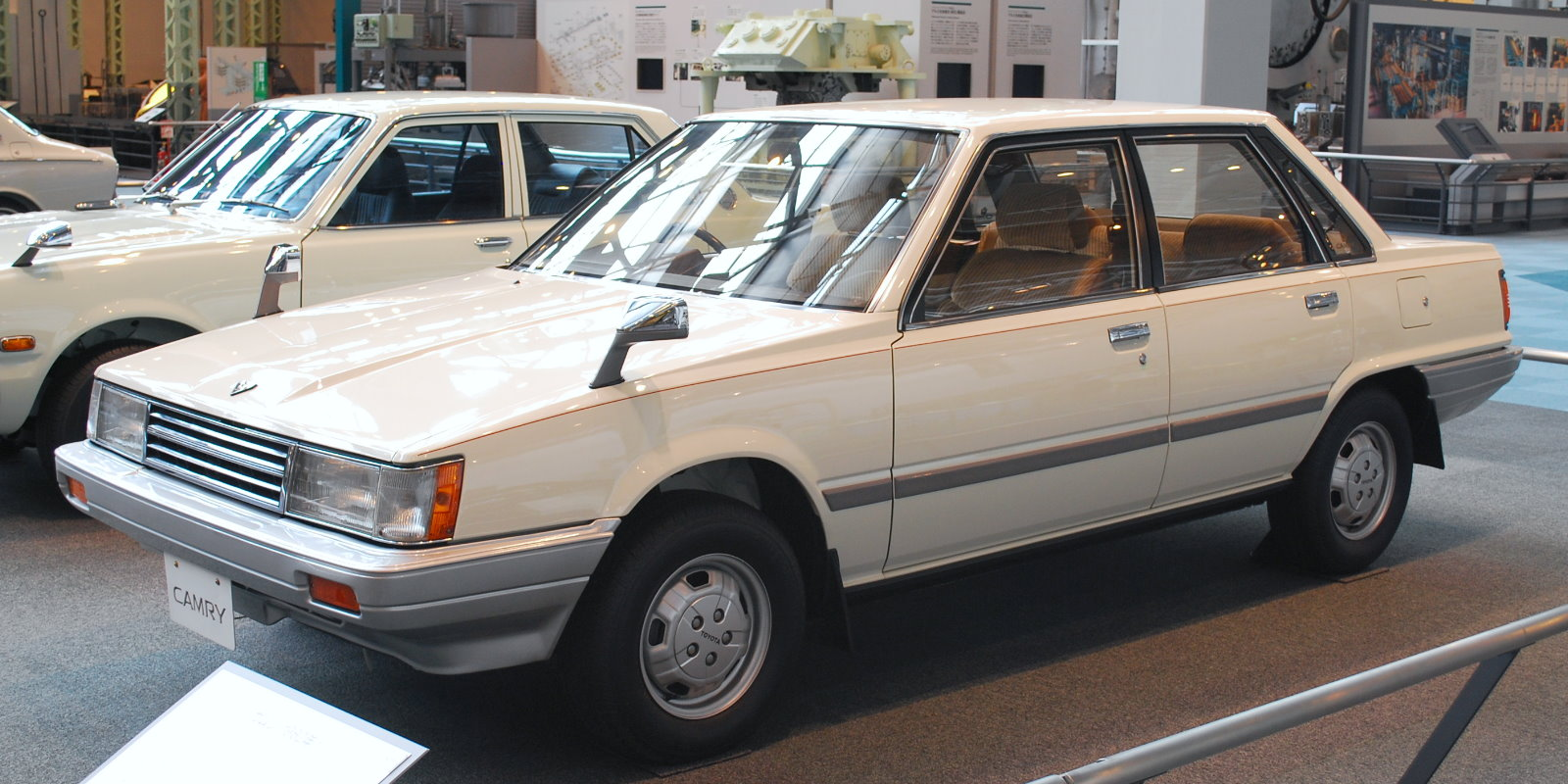
1982 Toyota Camry

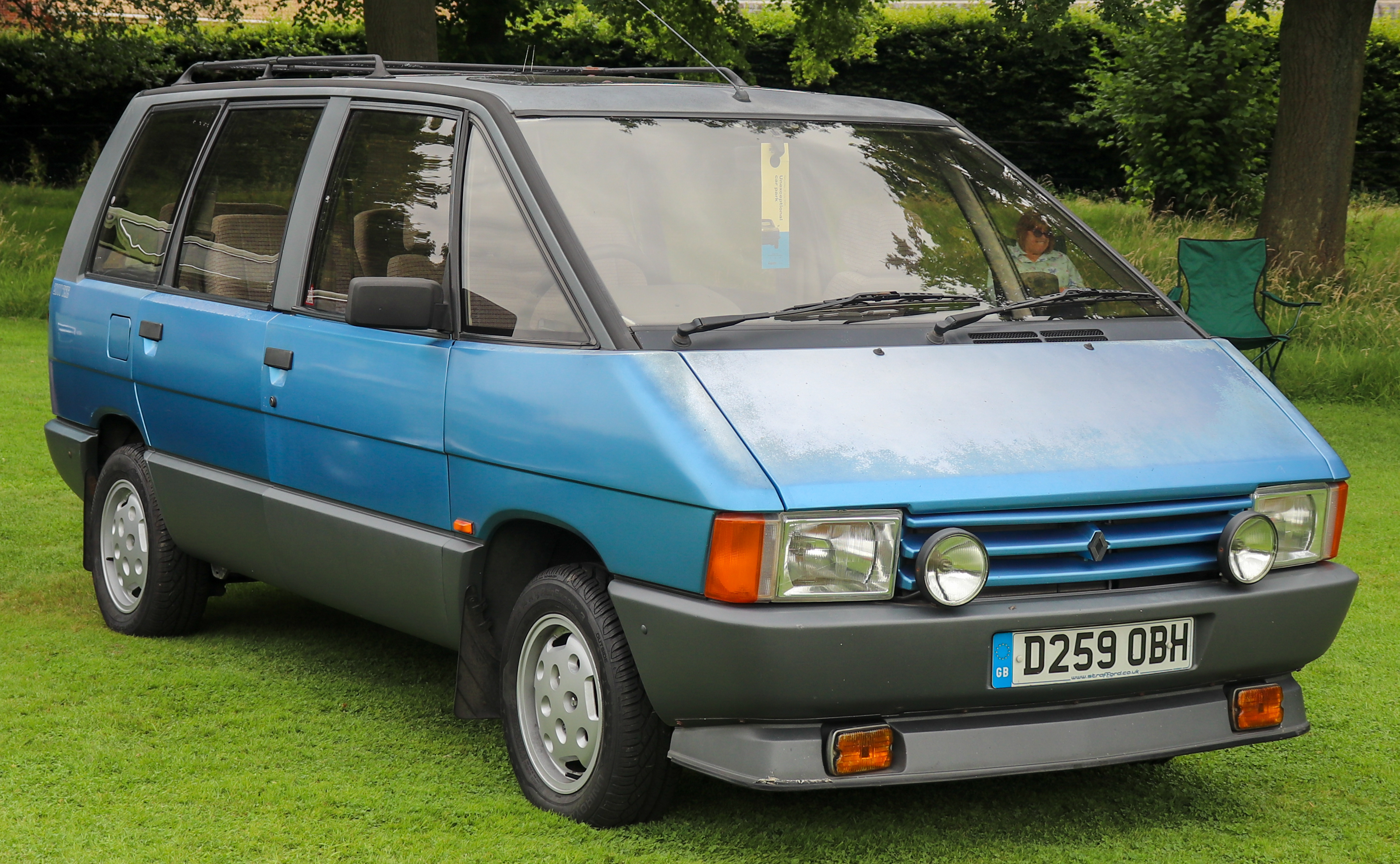
1987 Renault Espace

A significant change in automobile design since World War II was the popularity of pontoon style, in which running boards were eliminated and fenders were incorporated into the body. This style had been explored on a small handful of cars before the war, but entered the mainstream in the postwar era. Among the first postwar representatives of the style were the Soviet GAZ-M20 Pobeda (1946), British Standard Vanguard (1947), US Studebaker Champion, and Kaiser (1946), as well as the Czech Tatra T600 Tatraplan (1946) and the Italian Cisitalia 202 sports car (1947).

Automobile design and production finally emerged from the military orientation and the shadow of war in 1949, the year high-compression V8 engines and modern bodies from General Motors's Oldsmobile and Cadillac brands were introduced. Hudson presented the "step-down" design with the 1948 Commodore, which placed the passenger compartment down inside the perimeter of the frame, that was one of the first new-design postwar cars made, and it featured trend-setting slab-side styling. The unibody/strut-suspended 1951 Ford Consul joined the 1948 Morris Minor and 1949 Rover P4 in the automobile market in the UK. In Italy, Enzo Ferrari was beginning his 250 series, just as Lancia introduced the revolutionary V6-powered Aurelia.

Throughout the 1950s, engine power and vehicle speeds rose, designs became more integrated and artful, and automobiles were marketed internationally. Alec Issigonis's Mini and Fiat's 500 diminutive cars were introduced in Europe, while the similar kei car class became popular in Japan. The Volkswagen Beetle continued production after World War II and began exports to other nations, including the US. At the same time, Nash introduced the Nash Rambler, the first successful modern compact car made in the US, while the standard models produced by the "Big Three" domestic automakers grew larger, featuring increasing amounts of chrome trim, and luxury as exemplified by the Cadillac Eldorado Brougham. The markets in Europe expanded with new small-sized automobiles, as well as expensive grand tourers (GT), like the Ferrari America.

The market changed in the 1960s, as the US "Big Three" automakers began facing competition from imported cars, European makers adopted advanced technologies, and Japan emerged as a car-producing nation. Japanese companies began to export some of their more popular cars in Japan internationally, such as the Toyota Corolla, Toyota Corona, Nissan Sunny, and Nissan Bluebird in the mid-1960s. The success of American Motors's compact-sized Rambler models spurred GM and Ford to introduce their own downsized cars in 1960. Performance engines became a focus of marketing by US automakers, exemplified by the era's muscle cars. In 1964, the Ford Mustang developed a new market segment, the pony car. New models to compete with the Mustang included the Chevrolet Camaro, AMC Javelin, and Plymouth Barracuda.

Captive imports and badge engineering increased in the US and the UK as amalgamated groups such as the British Motor Corporation consolidated the market. BMC's space-saving and trend-setting transverse engine, front-wheel-drive, independent suspension and monocoque bodied Mini, which first appeared in 1959, was marketed under the Austin and Morris names, until Mini became a marque in its own right in 1969. Competition increased, with Studebaker, a pioneering automaker, shutting down. The trend for consolidation reached Italy, where niche makers like Maserati, Ferrari, and Lancia were acquired by larger companies. By the decade's end, the number of automobile marques had been greatly reduced.

Technology developments included the widespread use of independent suspensions, wider application of fuel injection, and an increasing focus on safety in automotive design. Innovations during the 1960s included NSU's Wankel engine, the gas turbine, and the turbocharger. Of these, only the last endured, pioneered by General Motors, and adopted by BMW and Saab, later seeing mass-market use during the 1980s by Chrysler. Mazda continued developing its Wankel engine despite problems in longevity, emissions, and fuel economy. Other Wankel licensees, including Mercedes-Benz and GM, never produced their designs because of engineering and manufacturing problems and the need for greater fuel economy after the 1973 oil crisis.

The 1970s were turbulent years for automakers and buyers, with prominent events reshaping the industry, such as the 1973 oil crisis, stricter automobile emissions control and safety requirements, increasing exports by the Japanese and European automakers, as well as growth in inflation and the stagnant economic conditions in many nations. Smaller-sized cars grew in popularity. During the Malaise era, the US saw the establishment of the subcompact segment with the introduction of the AMC Gremlin, followed by the Chevrolet Vega and Ford Pinto. The station wagon (estate, break, kombi, universal) body design was popular, as well as increasing sales of noncommercial all-wheel drive off-road vehicles.

Toward the end of the 20th century, the US Big Three (GM, Ford, and Chrysler) partially lost their leading position. Japan became a leader in car production for a time, and cars began to be mass manufactured in new Asian, East European, and other countries.

Examples of postwar cars:

- 1946–1958 GAZ-M20 Pobeda—Soviet car with full pontoon design.
- 1947–1958 Standard Vanguard—British mass-market car with a complete pontoon design.
- 1948–1971 Morris Minor—an early postwar car exported around the world.
- 1953–1971 Chevrolet Bel Air and 1953–2002 Cadillac Eldorado Brougham—first generations were representative of tailfin design.
- 1955–1976 Citroën DS—aerodynamic design and innovative technology, awarded third place as Car of the 20th Century.
- 1959–2000 Mini—a radical and innovative small car that was manufactured for four decades; awarded second place as Car of the 20th Century.
- 1960-1990 Volkswagen Brasília.
- 1961–1975 Jaguar E-Type—a classic sports car design.
- 1963–1989 Porsche 911—a sports car awarded fifth place as Car of the 20th Century.
- 1964–present Ford Mustang—the pony car that became one of the bestselling cars of the era.
- 1966–1974 Fiat 124—an Italian car that was produced under license in many other countries including the Soviet Union, Russia, Spain and Turkey, until 2012.
- 1966–1971 Subaru 1000—one of the first Japanese built sedans using a boxer engine, front wheel drive and introducing the "double offset joint" driveshaft to the front wheels.
- 1967 NSU Ro 80—the basic wedge profile of this design was emulated in subsequent decades.
- 1969 Nissan S30—Japanese sports car.
- 1966–1992 Oldsmobile Toronado—First modern-era American car with front-wheel drive as well as introduced electronic antilock braking system and airbag.
- 1972–present Mercedes-Benz S-Class—Popular luxury sedan that was the first car with features such as seat belt pretensioners and an electronic stability control system.
- 1975–present BMW 3 Series—the 3 Series has been on Car and Driver magazine's annual Ten Best list 17 times.
- 1977–present Honda Accord saloon/sedan—a Japanese sedan that became popular in the US.
- 1983–present Chrysler minivans—the two-box minivan design nearly pushed the station wagon out of the market.
- 1984–present Renault Espace—first mass-produced one-volume car of noncommercial MPV class.

=== Modern era ===
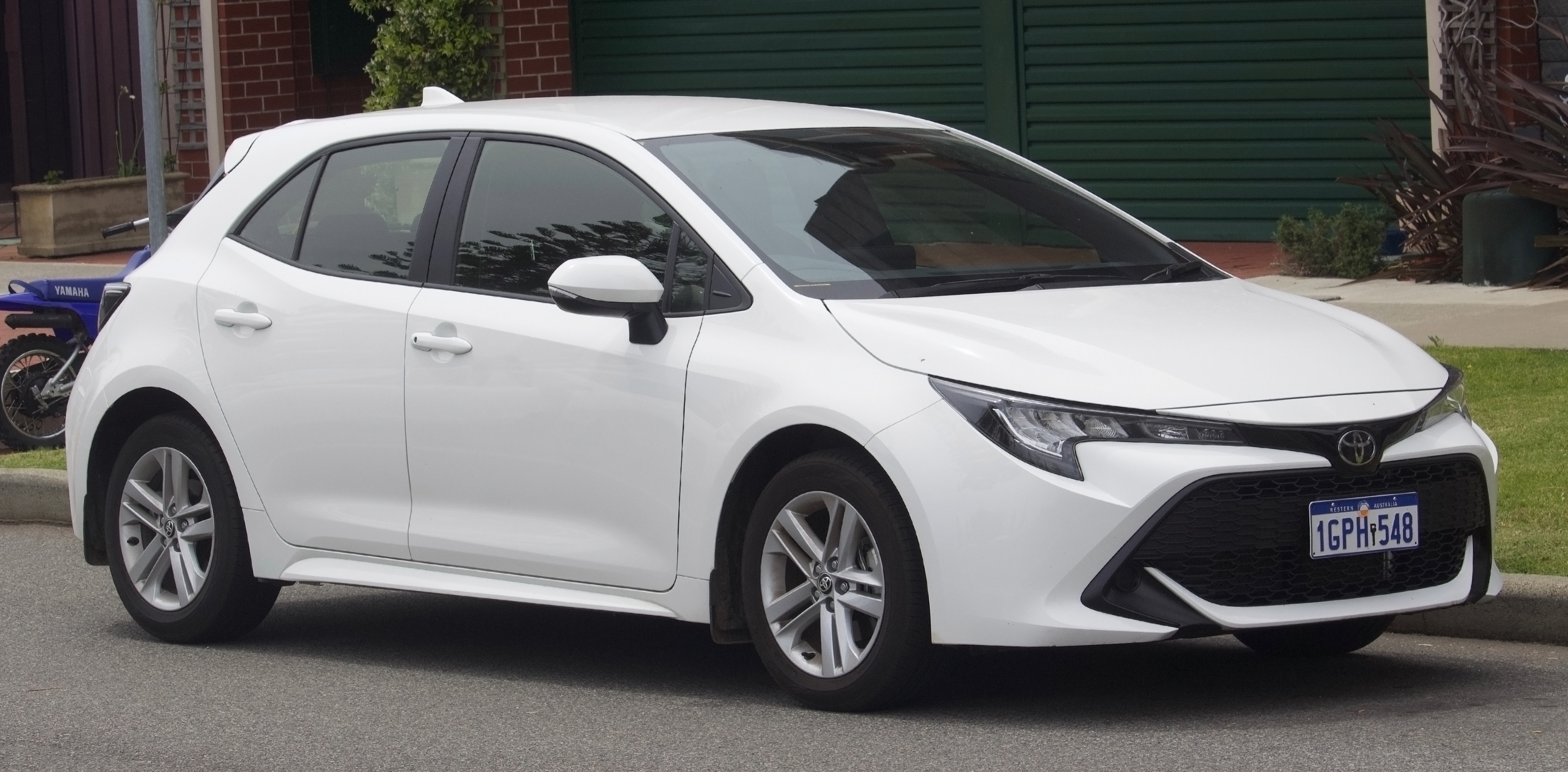
The Toyota Corolla is the world's bestselling nameplate.

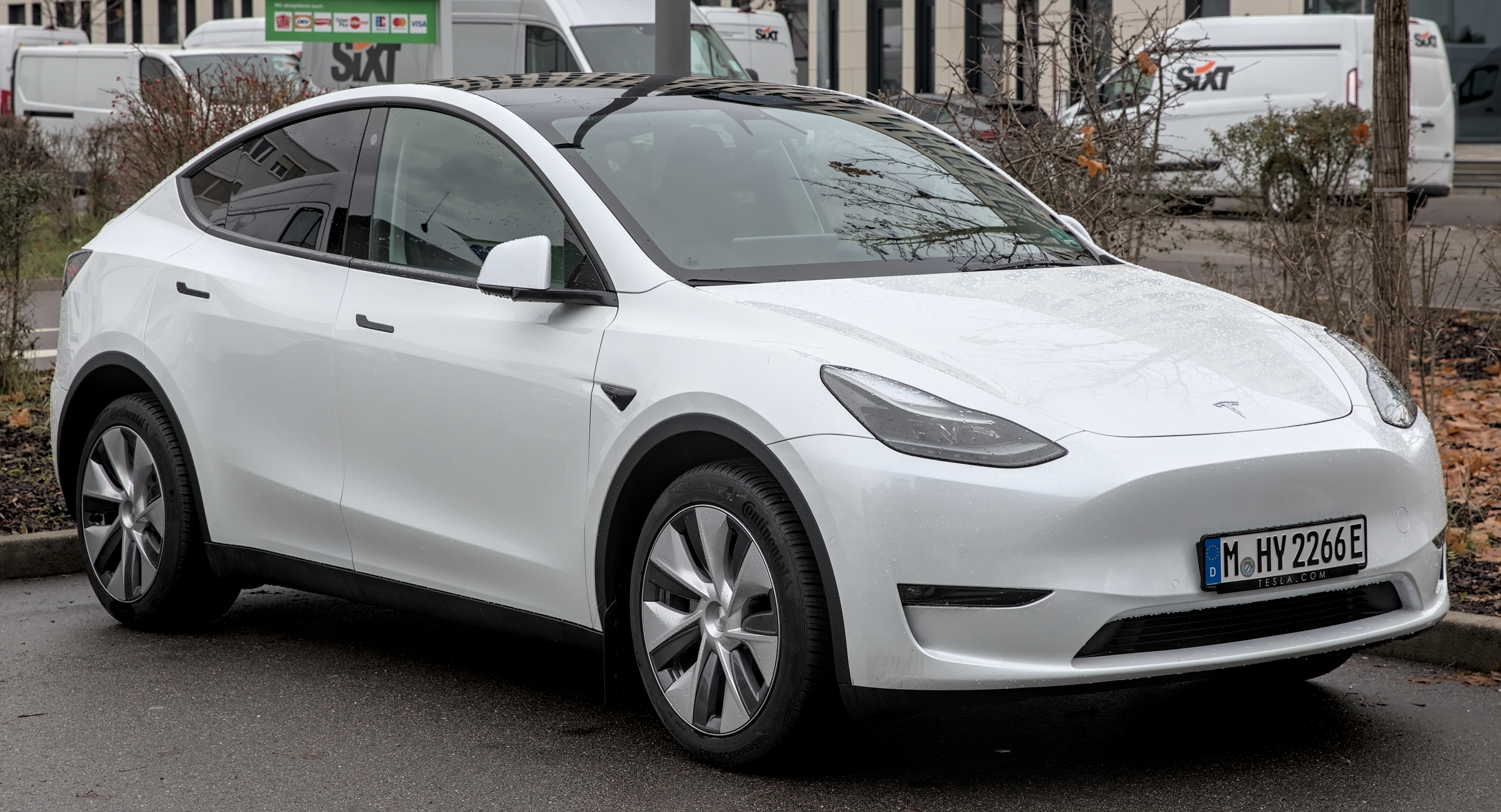
A Tesla Model Y electric car, the world's best-selling electric car, and the best selling nameplate in 2023.

The modern era is normally defined as the 40 years preceding the current year. The modern era has been one of increasing standardization, platform sharing, and computer-aided design—to reduce costs and development time—and of increasing use of electronics for both engine management and entertainment systems.

Some developments which began to see mass adoption in the 1970s and 1980s and continued into the modern era are the proliferation of front- and all-wheel drive, the ubiquity of fuel injection, and the rise of turbocharging. Adoption of diesel engines in passenger cars continued to rise in Europe until the mid 2010s, when both diesel and gasoline engines began to lose market share to electric cars. In other markets, such as The US and Japan, diesel passenger car adoption remained stagnant or fell in this same period. Most modern passenger cars are front-wheel-drive monocoque or unibody designs with transversely mounted engines.

Body styles have changed as well in the modern era. The 1980s onwards saw the rise of the hatchback, sport utility vehicle, crossover SUV, minivan and MPV into mainstream popularity. The MPV class (smaller noncommercial passenger minivans) started to achieve mainstream popularity in the mid 1980s, with the French Renault Espace and the Chrysler minivan versions in the US being considered to be some of the first "modern" MPVs. Pickup trucks have also grown in popularity, particularly in the US, and particularly as passenger cars rather than as strictly work vehicles as they were typically used in previous eras. The rising popularity of SUVs and crossovers worldwide, starting in the 1990s, has changed the face of motoring and has been blamed for the decline in sales of other body styles such as sedans, station wagons, minivans and MPVs.

The modern era has also rapidly improved fuel efficiency and engine output. Emissions of modern cars have been reduced through the use of computerized engine management systems, use of smaller engines with turbochargers, hybrid systems, more aerodynamic designs, and other technologies.

The 2008 financial crisis cut almost a third of light vehicle sales from Chrysler, Toyota, Ford, and Nissan. It also subtracted about a fourth of Honda's sales and a seventh of sales from General Motors.

Since 2009, China has become the world's largest car manufacturer, producing more than Japan, the US, and Europe. Besides the increasing car production in Asia and other countries, there has been growth in transnational corporate groups, with the production of transnational automobiles sharing the same platforms and badge engineering or rebadging to suit different markets and consumer segments.

During the 2010s, electric cars began to become available for the average consumer, and became increasingly popular in the 2020s. Some countries such as Norway and Iceland quickly replaced gasoline cars with EVs, and the charging networks in much of Europe, North America, and China rapidly expanded.

Examples of modern cars:

- 1986–2019 Ford Taurus—a midsized front-wheel drive sedan that dominated the US market in the late 1980s.
- 1997–present Toyota Prius—launched in the Japanese market and became a popular hybrid electric vehicle in many markets.
- 1998–present Ford Focus—a popular hatchback and Ford's bestselling world car.
- 2008–2012 Tesla Roadster—first highway-capable all-electric vehicle in serial production for sale in the US in the modern era. It sold about 2,500 units worldwide.
- 2008–2013 BYD F3DM—first highway-capable series production plugin hybrid, launched in China in December 2008, sold over 2,300 units.
- 2010–present, Nissan Leaf and Chevrolet Volt—all-electric car and plugin hybrid correspondingly, launched in December 2010, were the world's top-selling mass production vehicles of their kind. As of December 2015, global Volt sales totaled over 100,000. Nissan Leaf global sales achieved the 300,000 unit milestone in January 2018, which made the Leaf the world's all-time bestselling highway-capable electric car in history at the time.
- 2012–present, Tesla Model S—Plugin electric vehicle that was ranked the world's bestselling plugin electric vehicle in 2015. It was also named car of the century by Car and Driver.
- 2020–present Tesla Model Y—Plugin electric vehicle that was ranked the bestselling car worldwide in 2023, and, as of May 2025, is the best selling plugin electric vehicle of all time.

== See also ==
- Auto dependency
- Automotive industry – current production and companies
- Car-free movement
- Highway revolt
- History of the internal combustion engine
- History of transport
- Motorcycle
  - List of motorcycles of the 1890s
- Timeline of motor vehicle brands
- Timeline of early North American automobiles

Beginnings

- Benz Patent Motorwagen ("patent motorcar"; 1885), a three-wheel vehicle widely regarded as the world's first production automobile
- Benz Velo (1894), follow-up 4-wheel model of the Benz Patent Motorwagen

Early developments essential to the development of automobiles

- Nicolas Léonard Sadi Carnot, physics of the internal combustion engine
- Illuminating gas, first internal combustion engine fuel
- Ligroin or heavy naphtha, first liquid automotive fuel, n-hexane

Car and car engine designers, chronologically by first vehicle/engine built

- Nicolaus Otto, developer of the first successful compressed charge gaseous fueled internal combustion engine (1860s-70s)
- Wilhelm Maybach, designed engines starting in the 1870s-80s; the first motorbike (1885), the second internal combustion car (1889)
- Gottlieb Daimler, German engineer, pioneer of internal-combustion engines and automobile development (1870s and on)
