= Haase (car) =

The Haase was an American Veteran make of car produced by Northwestern Furniture Company in Milwaukee between 1902 and 1904. It was named after the company director at the time.

== Details ==
All cars produced were two-seater coupes with identical bodywork. 6 bhp was produced from a rear-mounted two-cylinder engine, the radiator of which was placed at the front. A tiller rather than a wheel was used for control of the vehicle. Production was halted after fifteen units were sold.

The Haase Automobiles were produced by The Northwestern Automobile Co. in Milwaukee, WI. The maker of the 1400 pound Haase is also reported to be The Northwestern Furniture Co. Charles L. Hasse, jr owned The Northwestern Automobile Co. The company was located at 271 West Water Street in Milwaukee.

Very few Haase automobiles were made. This American Automobile was built in two models, one with a 2 cylinder engine that developed 6 horsepower and the other a 2 cylinder with an 8 horsepower engine. Model designation was Model A and B. The 8 horsepower model B claimed 40 MPH.
