= Grisons automobile ban =

Cantonal ban on motorized automobiles, 1900–1925

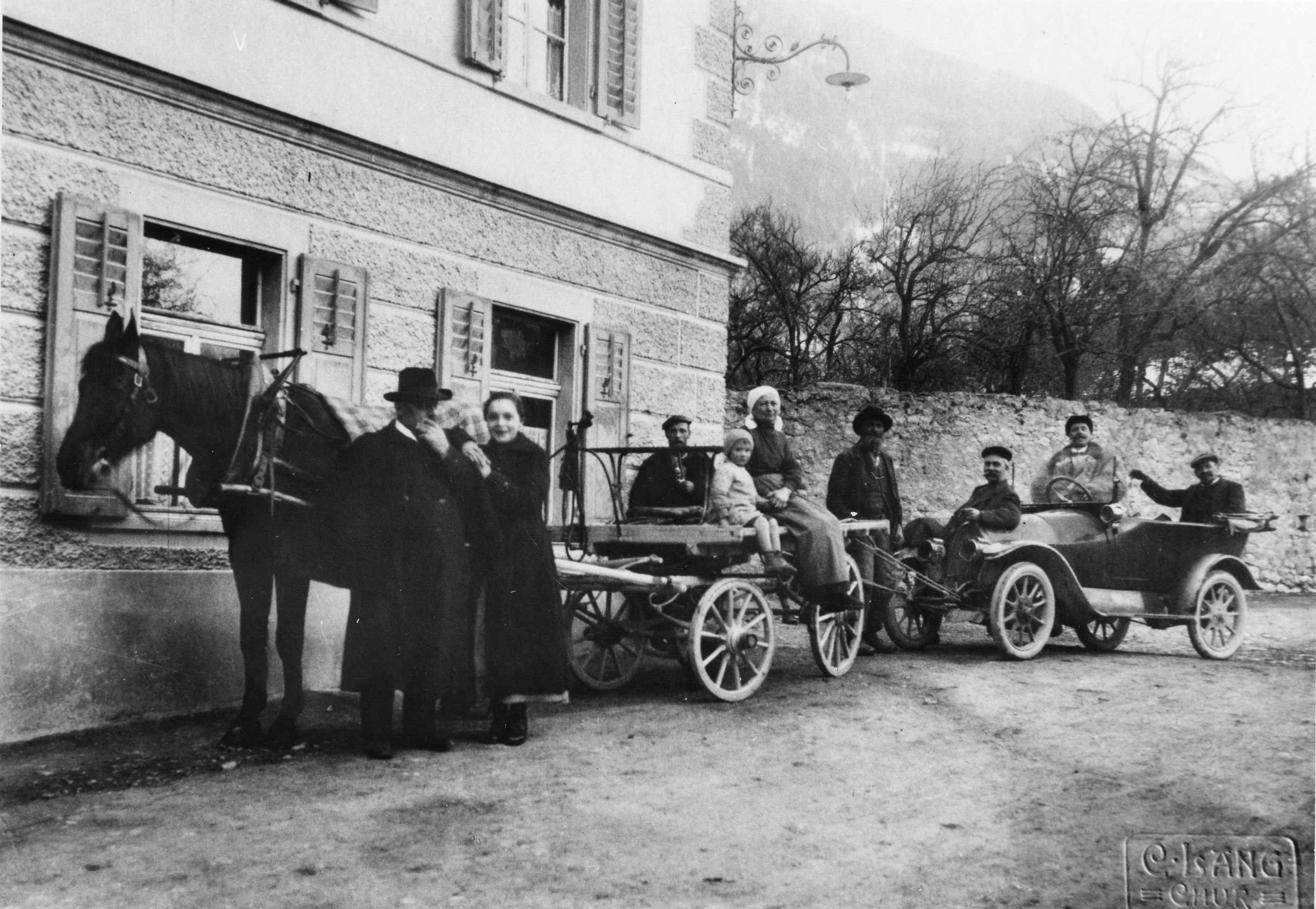
A car is towed via horse and wagon in Malans, Grisons, 1900–1911.

Between 1900 and 1925, it was prohibited to drive automobiles and other motorized vehicles on the streets of the Swiss canton of Grisons. A total of nine cantonal referendums concerning the ban were held, the last of which resulted in the ban being lifted on 21 June 1925.

== History ==
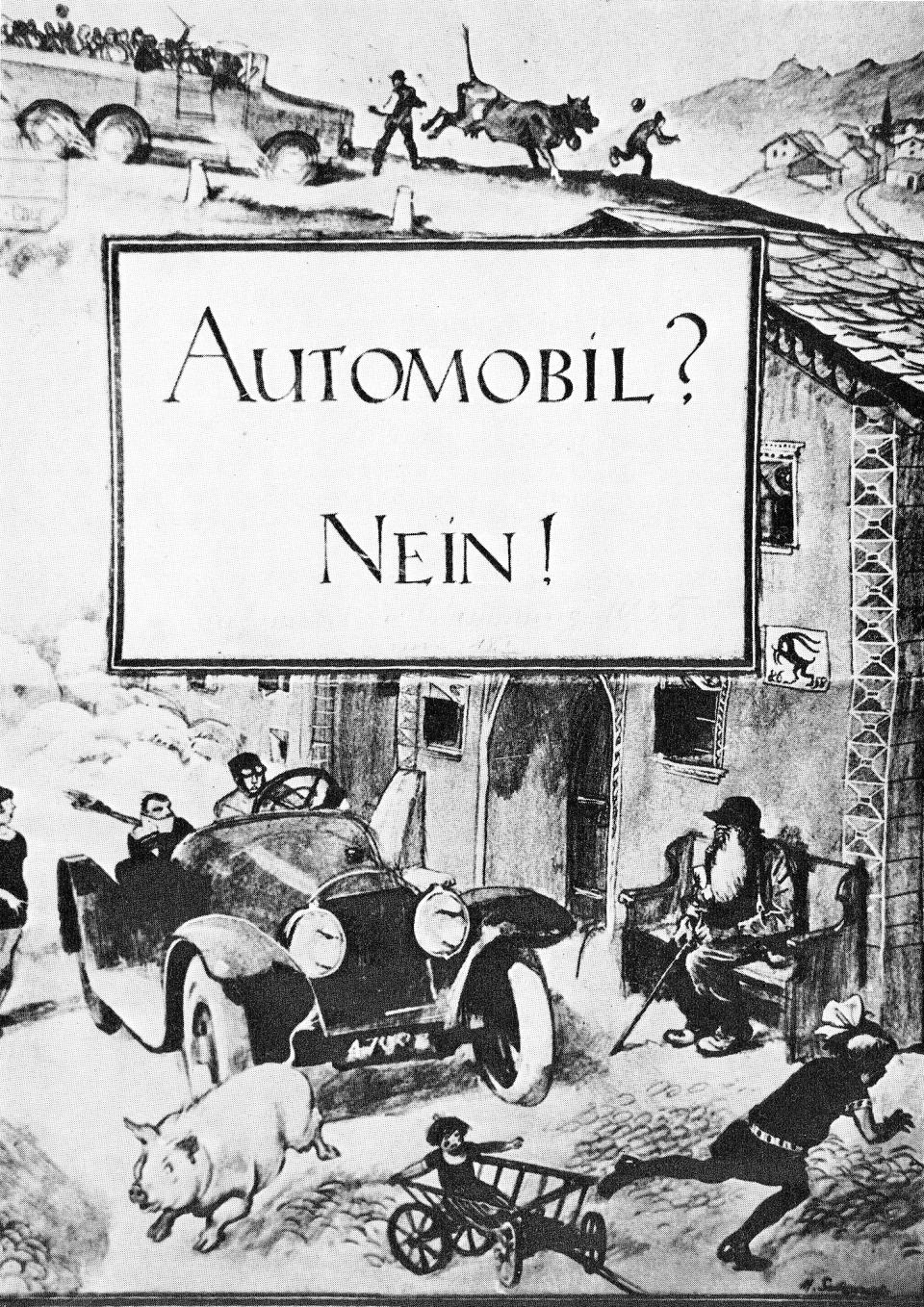
Anti-car flyer against lifting the ban prior to the 1925 referendum

The mountainous canton of Grisons is the largest canton in Switzerland with a land area of 7,185 km^{2} (2,774 sq mi). It already had a large road network around 1900, but these roads were unpaved and used only by pedestrians, horse-drawn carts and carriages. Gaudenz Issler, a member of the Grand Council of Grisons from Davos, became the first car owner in Grisons in 1897, but returned it to the seller after only a short time, because he believed that the roads in Grisons were not suitable for automobiles.

=== Enactment of the ban ===
The advent of the automobile in the late 19th century was met with suspicion and fear by the majority of the Grisons population. On 17 August 1900, the Small Council of Grisons issued a ban of all motorized vehicles on all cantonal roads, after reports of incidents in which pedestrian and horse-drawn traffic had been endangered by automobiles.

The reasons for the automobile ban were diverse: The population generally had a negative attitude toward the new mode of transportation, as the rural population of the Grisons perceived the automobile as a toy for the wealthy urban upper class. Cars were relatively fast, noisy, and kicked up a lot of dust on the unpaved roads, thereby hindering other road users. Furthermore, the financially limited canton of Grisons found itself unable to adapt its extensive road network to the new mode of transportation. Carriage drivers were also opposed to cars, as they saw their business—transporting people and goods by horse—under threat. The Rhaetian Railway was equally critical, viewing the car as serious competition to rail traffic.

The ban also drew criticism. The main opponents of the car ban were the tourism industry and hoteliers. However, since the ban enjoyed broad public support, hoteliers sought to have the restrictions eased instead of lifting the ban.

As a result of the ban, car owners were not allowed to drive their cars on public roads. Automobilists travelling through Grisons by car had to switch off the engine at the border and have their cars towed through Grisons by horses or oxen. For example, German businessman Karl August Lingner, who owned Tarasp Castle in the Engadin valley, had to have his limousine pulled by horses from the cantonal border to his property.

Starting in 1903, the Small Council of Grisons started granting special permissions allowing select individuals and companies to drive motorized vehices on cantonal roads, such as doctors’ cars, ambulances and specific lorries. The permissions were granted very restrictively and only after individual review of each case.

=== Referendums and lifting of the ban ===
In 1906, the Small Council of Grisons decided to open certain road sections to automobile traffic. However, this decision was overturned by a referendum on 13 October 1907, in which 11,184 voters opposed lifting the ban while 2,074 were in favor. Nevertheless, the Council continued its previous practice of granting permits and decided on 14 May 1910 to fully open the road between the border of the Canton of St. Gallen (near Landquart) and Chur to automobile traffic. This decision was again overturned by another referendum in 1911. During World War I, the automobile ban was temporarily relaxed: Military trucks were granted permission to drive on the cantonal roads, and some valleys had to be supplied by lorry, since many horses were drafted into the army.

In 1919, a route in Grisons between Reichenau and Flims was opened to the Swiss Postauto for the first time. Even though opinions on the automobile became more favorable over time, a series of subsequent referendums in the early 1920s turned out in favor of the opponents of automobile traffic. The automobile ban was finally rescinded on 21 June 1925, after another referendum in which 11,318 citizens voted in favor of lifting the ban, narrowly surpassing the 10,271 voters that supported its upholding.

== Later developments ==
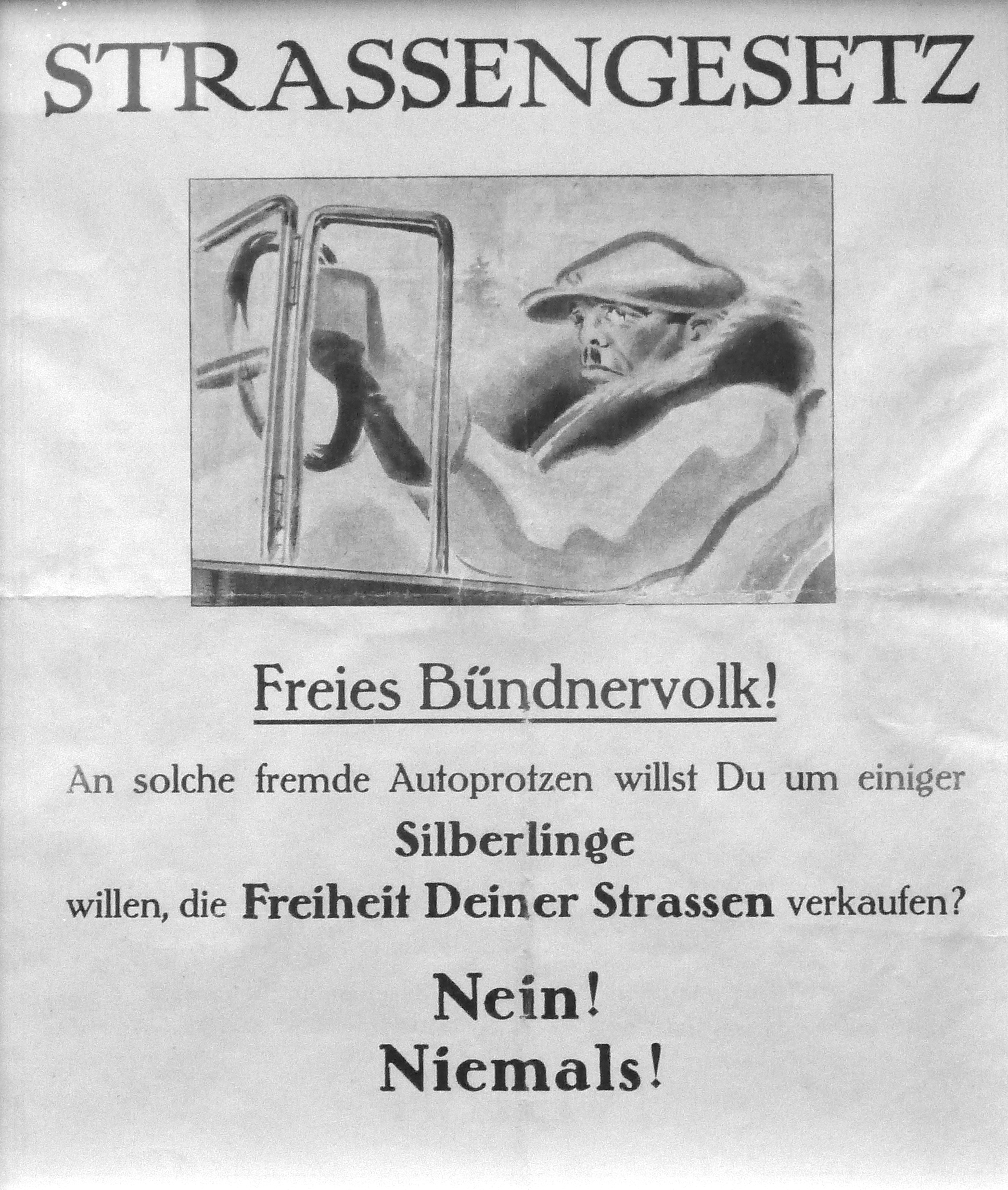
Campaign propaganda from 1927 regarding the proposed federal law on road traffic

In 1927, the Federal Council of Switzerland was aiming to standardise the non-uniform cantonal laws and regulations regarding road traffic. The proposed bill was rejected in a statewide referendum. In March 1932, a new draft bill was passed by the Federal Assembly, which took effect on 1 December 1932. This marked the beginning of federal road traffic legislation.

After the automobile ban was lifted in 1925, the number of motor vehicles in the canton of Grisons grew sharply, increasing almost ten-fold within just six years, from 260 to 2,262 vehicles.

Year	Cars	Trucks	Motorbikes	Total
1925	136	7	117	260
1926	283	31	300	614
1927	412	35	482	929
1928	612	43	706	1,361
1929	814	58	903	1,775
1930	1,051	75	1,136	2,262

As Grisons was the last Swiss canton to allow motorised traffic, road development was slow: In the 1960s, just one-third of the roads in the canton of Grisons were paved, while in the rest of Switzerland, 76% of roads were paved.

== See also ==
- Prince Edward Island automobile ban
