= Jonathan S. Raymond =

Canadian academic

Jonathan S. Raymond is an American academic who serves as President Emeritus of Trinity Western University. He served as the third President Trinity Western University from 2006 to 2013.

He earned his Ph.D. in Cross-Cultural Psychology and Master of Arts in Social Psychology from the University of Kentucky, in 1975 and 1972 respectively. He earned his Bachelor of Arts in Psychology from Asbury College in 1970. His doctoral research was conducted in Lima, Peru in the fall of 1973. He taught psychology as a doctoral student at the University of Kentucky and Transylvania University in Lexington, Kentucky in the Spring and Fall of 1974 and was a lecturer in psychology for the University of Maryland in Germany in 1975–1976. From Fall 1976 through the fall of 1979, he taught on the faculty of Arizona State University in Tempe, Arizona. From January 1980 to November 1981, he served on the faculty of psychology at the University of Hawaii and from November 1981 to August 1990, he was appointed to the faculty of the graduate school of public health at the University of Hawaii earning the rank of full professor with tenure. During that time, he served as the Director of the International Centre for Health Promotion and Disease Prevention Research at the University of Hawaii and Principal Investigator for the U.S. Congressional study of health care in the American Pacific. He helped to found the Asia-Pacific Academic Consortium for Public Health and the Asia-Pacific Journal of Public Health. He was also awarded a medal from the Royal Family of Thailand for contributions to the health of the people of Thailand and Asia. In August 1990, he was appointed Dean of the Faculty (Chief Academic Officer)of Gordon College in Wenham, Massachusetts. In January 1994, he was appointed vice president for Academic Affairs at Greenville College (Illinois) and in 1998 became the co-editor of the Salvation Army's scholarly journal of theology and ministry, Word & Deed. In July 1999, he became the President of Booth University College in Winnipeg, Manitoba, Canada until July 2006 when he began work at the President of Trinity Western University and Seminary in Langley, British Columbia, Canada. In 2013, he was awarded the Queen's Diamond Jubilee medal for contributions to the education of the people of British Columbia and Canada. In 2015 The American Psychological Association, Society for Occupational Health Psychology, and the CDC/National Institute for Occupational Health and Safety presented him with an award for his "distinguished contribution leading to the inception of the field of Occupational Health Psychology.

He served on The Salvation Army's International Doctrine Council from 2006 to 2011 and The Salvation Army Advisory Board, Vancouver, British Columbia. He is the author of "Called to a Higher Purpose", TWU Press, 2009, and Higher Higher Education: Integrating Holiness Into All of Campus Life, Aldersgate Press, 2015. From 1998 to the present, he has served as the co-editor of Word and Deed: The Salvation Army Journal of Theology and Ministry.

== Personal life ==
He is married to R. Irene Raymond, who taught Spanish at Trinity Western University, and has two children.
