= Lowell Haines =

American lawyer

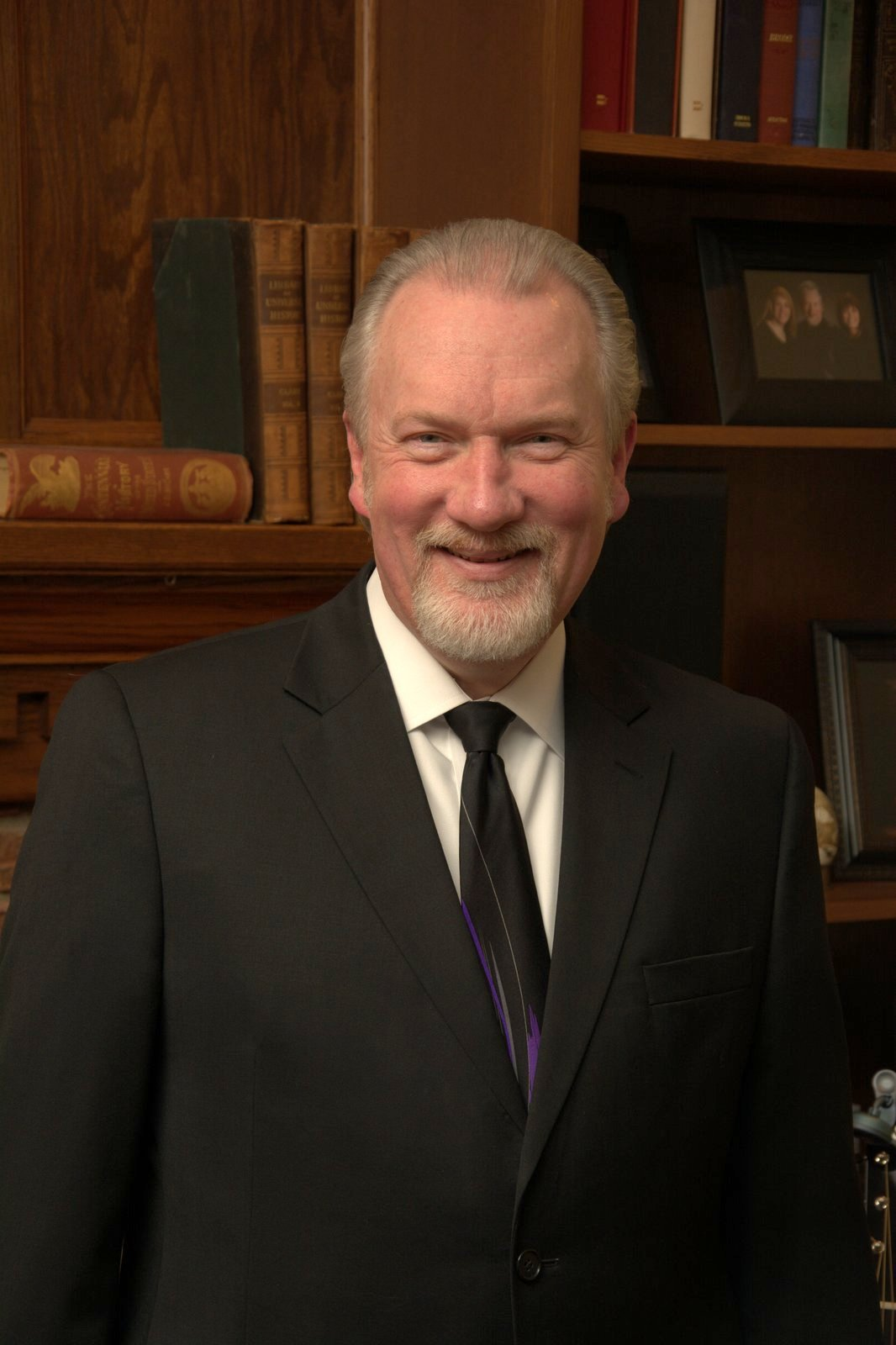
Lowell Haines

Paul Lowell Haines served as the 31st President, 2016-2019, of Taylor University in Upland, Indiana.

He was named Taylor's President in January 2016, following a nationwide search. Haines is a 1975 alumnus of Taylor and served on Taylor's administrative staff from 1977-1987, rising to the position of Vice President for Student Development before leaving Taylor to attend law school at the Maurer School of Law at Indiana University (Bloomington, Indiana) in 1987. During his law school experience Haines served as Editor-in-Chief of the Indiana Law Journal.

Following his graduation from IU with a Juris Doctor degree, cum laude, Haines joined the law firm of Baker & Daniels in Indianapolis (now Faegre Baker Daniels), where he served for 25 years – the last 17 of which as a partner in the firm. Haines' legal work focused on the needs of nonprofit, tax-exempt organizations, with a special emphasis on institutions of higher education. His legal practice grew to include the representation of dozens of colleges and universities throughout the United States and around the world.

During his legal career, Haines was regularly named to the list of Best Lawyers in America and was named Indianapolis Education Lawyer of the Year in 2013.

In addition to his degrees from Indiana University and Taylor University, Haines holds a Master of Arts In Student Personnel Administration in Higher Education from Ball State University (Muncie, Indiana), and a Doctor of Education from the University of Pennsylvania (Philadelphia, Pennsylvania).

Haines has served on the Board of Trustees of Taylor University since 2003. Haines also has served on the board of trustees for the Council of Christian Colleges and Universities (CCCU), in Washington, D.C., and on the boards of the Christian College Consortium, the Allen Whitehill Clowes Charitable Foundation, the Independent Colleges of Indiana, and the Crossroads League Athletic Conference.

Haines’ wife, Sherryl Ann, is an artist and served as an art teacher in public and private schools for 30 years before becoming First Lady. Haines and his wife are parents to one daughter, Hannah Elizabeth.
