= Ted Engstrom =

American evangelical leader and author (1916–2006)

- Born: Theodore Wilhelm Engstrom; 1 March 1916; Cleveland, Ohio
- Died: 14 July 2006 (aged 90); Bradbury, California
- Education: English and journalism, Taylor University, 1938
- Occupations: Evangelical leader and author

Theodore Wilhelm Engstrom (1 March 1916 – 14 July 2006) was an American evangelical leader and author. He was the head of Youth for Christ and World Vision International. Engstrom was one of the founding architects and a board member of the Evangelical Council for Financial Accountability.

== Biography ==
Theodore Wilhelm Engstrom was born on March 1, 1916, in Cleveland, Ohio. He became Christian while a freshman at Taylor University in 1935. He graduated in 1938 as an English and journalism major. Engstrom began his career with Zondervan Publishing House in the 1940s, where he became editorial director and then general manager. In 1947, he directed a 10-day evangelistic crusade led by evangelist Billy Graham.

In 1951, Engstrom became executive director of Youth for Christ International. In 1963, he was recruited as executive vice president of World Vision International by Bob Pierce, the organization's founder. Engstrom served two years as president of the organization before retiring in 1987. In 1986, he was among the signers of "A MANIFESTO FOR THE CHRISTIAN CHURCH" promoted by the Coalition on Revival, which, condemns extra-marital sexual relationships and homosexuality.

Engstrom was a productive writer, averaging a book a year for over 50 years plus numerous magazine and journal articles.

Engstrom died July 14, 2006, at his home in Bradbury, California. He was 90.
