= Taylor University =

Private Christian university in Upland, Indiana, U.S.

Coordinates: 40°27′29″N 85°29′50″W

- Taylor University
- Former names: Fort Wayne Female College (1846–1890); Fort Wayne College (1850–1890)
- Motto: Lux et Fides
- Motto in English: Light and Faith
- Type: Private university
- Established: 1846; 180 years ago
- Religious affiliation: Non-denominational Christian
- Academic affiliations: NAICU; CCCU; CCC
- Endowment: $98.9 million (2020)
- President: D. Michael Lindsay
- Faculty: 133
- Students: 2,221 (2022)
- Undergraduates: 2,188
- Postgraduates: 33
- Location: Upland, Indiana, U.S.
- Campus: 952 acres (385 ha); Small town
- Colors: Purple and gold
- Nickname: Trojans
- Sporting affiliations: NAIA – Crossroads
- Website: taylor.edu
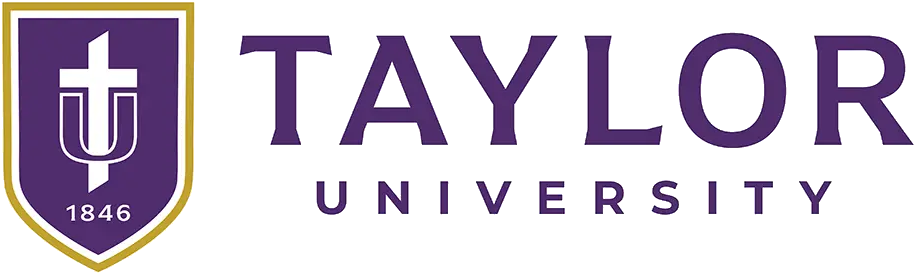

Taylor University is a private Christian university in Upland, Indiana. Founded in 1846, it is one of the oldest evangelical Christian universities in the United States.

The university is named after Bishop William Taylor. The university sits on an approximately 950 acres (3.8 km^{2}) campus on the south side of Upland. It also preserves a 680 acres (2.8 km^{2}) arboretum and an additional 668 acres (2.70 km^{2}) of undeveloped land northeast of campus which has 80 acres (320,000 m^{2}) more of arboretum space.

As of 2024, Taylor University has 1,901 undergraduate students, 24 graduate students, and 436 distance learning students. The student body hails from 38 states and 26 foreign countries, with 44 percent from Indiana. Taylor is a member of the National Association of Intercollegiate Athletics. The university is accredited by the Higher Learning Commission and is a member of the Council for Christian Colleges and Universities and the Christian College Consortium.

In August 2021, D. Michael Lindsay was named as the current president.

== History ==
=== Founding ===
In 1846, Taylor University was originally established as Fort Wayne Female College in Fort Wayne, Indiana. In the first full year of the school, about 100 women were enrolled, paying $22.50 per year. During this time, it was common for women to obtain an M.E.L. degree, the Mistress of English Literature. Fort Wayne Female College was founded by the Methodist Church as an all-female school.

In 1850, Fort Wayne Female College started admitting men coeducationally and changed its name to Fort Wayne College.

In 1890, Fort Wayne College acquired the former facilities of nearby Fort Wayne Medical College that were vacated after Fort Wayne Medical College's merger with Indiana Asbury College, another Methodist-affiliated college. Upon completing this acquisition, Fort Wayne College changed its name to Taylor University in honor of Bishop William Taylor. The original Taylor University campus was on College Street in Fort Wayne.

=== Move to Upland ===
In 1882, a guest-preaching engagement in the Upland Methodist Church afforded Fort Wayne College president Thaddeus Reade the chance to meet the minister of Upland Methodist Church, Rev. John C. White. Because the school was having financial difficulties at its location in Fort Wayne, White and Upland citizen J.W. Pittinger worked to bring the school to Upland.

In the spring of 1893, White negotiated an agreement between the trustees of the now-named Taylor University and the Upland Land Company. The university agreed to move to Upland, Indiana, and the company agreed to provide Taylor with $10,000 in cash and 10 acres (40,000 m^{2}) of land. That summer, Taylor University relocated to Upland. White was able to find the resources to support Taylor University because of the recent discovery of large deposits of natural gas in the area.

In 1915, Taylor paid seven thousand dollars to purchase 70 acres (280,000 m^{2}) more from Charles H. and Bertha Snyder.

Early in the 1920s, the university added another 80 acres (320,000 m^{2}) to its present location when the Lewis Jones farm was purchased. After 1922, Taylor University was no longer formally affiliated with Methodism.

=== Summit Christian College and Fort Wayne ===
In 1992, ninety-nine years after moving to Upland, Taylor University acquired Summit Christian College located in the city of Fort Wayne. The college was subsequently renamed Taylor University Fort Wayne. Summit Christian College was founded in 1904 as the Bible Training School of Fort Wayne, later becoming Fort Wayne Bible Institute, and eventually, in 1950, Fort Wayne Bible College. In 1989 the school was renamed Summit Christian College. Prior to acquisition by Taylor University, Summit Christian College was affiliated with the Missionary Church.

With the urban setting of the campus in Fort Wayne, the academic programs tended to be more vocational and its student body more non-traditional. Reflecting this, of TUFW's 1,040 member student body, approximately 224 students lived on campus with the rest commuting or taking courses online. Popular majors included Professional Writing, Biblical Studies, Christian Ministries, Education, English, and Business.

The Taylor University Fort Wayne Falcons participated in the United States Collegiate Athletic Association. The school offered basketball for men and women, soccer for men and women (2008–2009 was the first year for the women's program), and women's volleyball.

On October 13, 2008, the university announced plans to discontinue traditional undergraduate programs on the Fort Wayne Campus. Programs that remained after the closure or were transitioned to the Upland campus included the MBA program, the online program, and the radio station, WBCL.

=== 2006 van accident ===
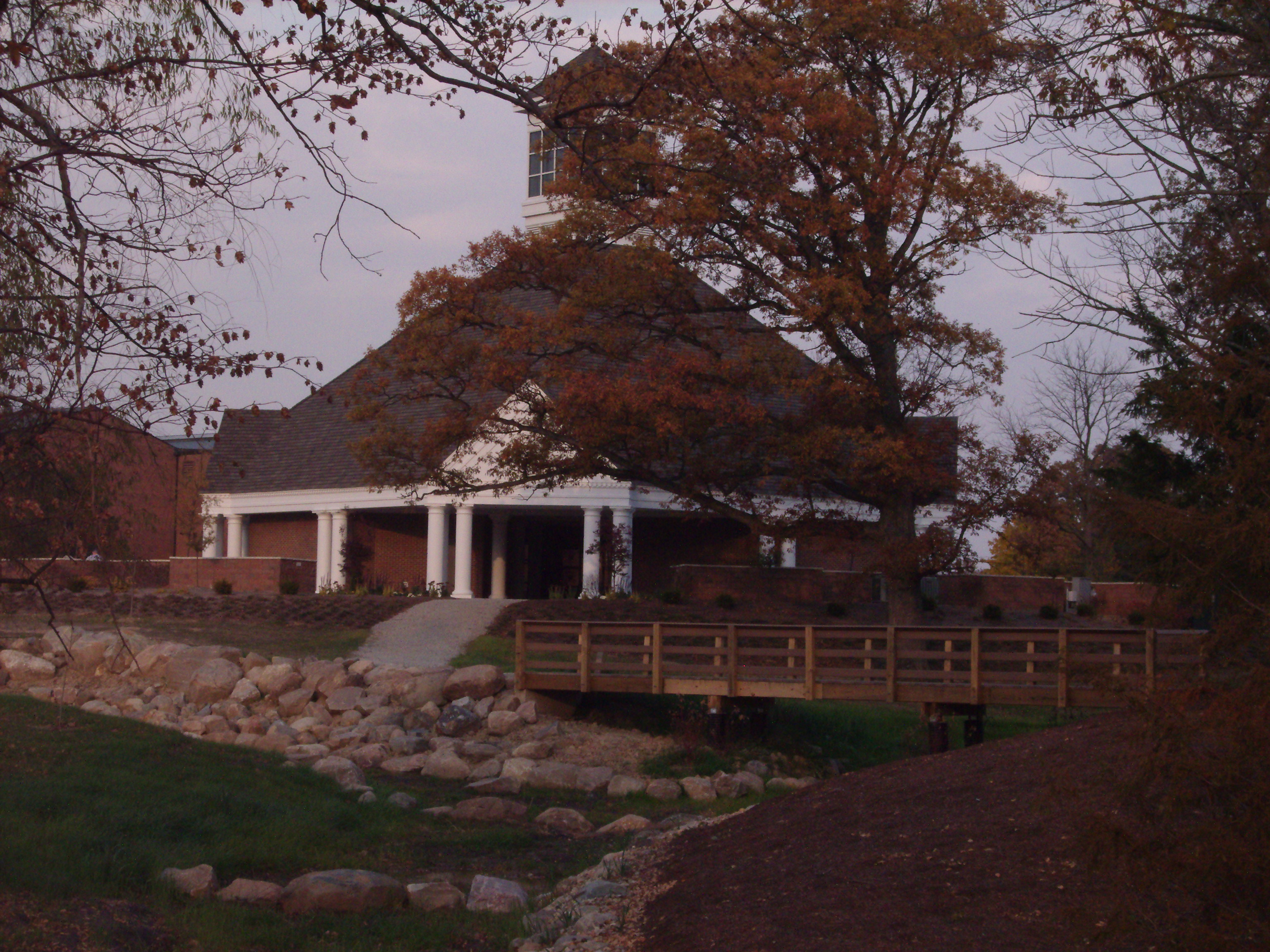
The Memorial Prayer Chapel built in memory of those killed in the van accident was opened Spring 2006.

On April 26, 2006, Taylor received national attention when a university van was involved in a fatal accident outside Marion, Indiana, while traveling between the Fort Wayne and Upland campuses. The accident happened when a northbound semi-trailer truck driver fell asleep at the wheel, crossed the median and struck the southbound passenger van on I-69. Four students and one staff member were killed, and three staff members and one student were injured. The accident occurred two days before former university president Eugene Habecker's inauguration ceremony. The truck driver was convicted of reckless, involuntary manslaughter and received a four-year prison sentence.

The coroner and Taylor officials failed to positively identify all the victims. The incident made international headlines when there was a case of mistaken identity between two of the victims. Senior Laura Van Ryn, who died on the scene, was mistaken for surviving freshman Whitney Cerak. A funeral was conducted with a closed casket for Whitney Cerak, and the mistake was not discovered until Cerak identified herself after waking up from a coma over a month later. On May 23, 2009, Cerak graduated from Taylor, and the two families remain close.

On April 26, 2008, the second anniversary of the accident, the university dedicated the $2.4 million Memorial Prayer Chapel as a memorial to the victims: students Laurel Erb, Brad Larson, Betsy Smith and Laura Van Ryn, along with Taylor employee Monica Felver. As a result of this incident, Indiana changed its procedure for identifying victims involved in accidents.

=== Vision 2016 ===
Upon inauguration President Eugene Habecker unveiled his Taylor University Vision 2016 plan for the university. The initiative involved the creation of several centers of excellence on campus. The Center for Teaching and Learning Excellence was established and endowed. The center for Scripture engagement was partially endowed. And centers for Missions Computing, Ethics, C.S. Lewis and Faith, Film, and Media are in the process of being created. Programs were created in Ireland and Ecuador. The initiative involved the construction of several buildings around campus:

- 2008: The Prayer Chapel, built in memorial of the 2006 van crash was completed;
- 2008: Campbell Hall, an off campus university apartment complex completed;
- 2012: The Euler Science Complex, an addition to the Nussbaum science complex completed;
- 2012: Wolgemuth Hall an off campus university apartment complex completed;
- 2013: Breuninger Hall a residence hall connected to Gerig Hall completed; and
- 2016: LaRita Boren Campus Center, a replacement for the old student union was completed.
- 2016: As well, as upgrades to athletic facilities, landscaping, and other buildings were also undertaken.

=== Res Publica controversy ===
In 2018, several professors who believed their fundamentalist and conservative viewpoints were not well represented in the student newspaper published an anonymous underground newspaper called Excalibur. The student newspaper responded by asserting that they had not refused to publish any submitted articles and that when the associated professors published a piece in the newspaper the prior year they received pushback from the student body. The university president Lowell Haines criticized the publications, citing the targeted distribution of the paper in rooms of minorities and supporters of social justice, along with the unaccountability and inability to create and maintain dialogue with anonymous publications. At this point the authors of the newspaper, Jim Spiegel, Gary Ross, Richard Smith, and Ben Wehling, came forward, apologized for any perceived slights due to distribution, and stated that their goal was to create dialogue about viewpoints they felt were under-represented Several open letters were published, with one addressing the newspapers’ arguments directly, and another criticizing what it saw as the president's harsh response.

=== 2019 Commencement controversy ===
On March 24, 2019, university president Paul Lowell Haines announced that Vice President Mike Pence would be delivering the commencement speech at the 2019 graduation ceremonies. Controversy was immediate, the faculty voting on a motion of dissent, with 61 against the Pence invitation, 41 in favor and 3 abstaining. Competing petitions were organized, calling for the invitation to be rescinded or supporting the invitation. Student and faculty organized protests to walk out before the commencement speech, or to sit silently during the speech. Students and faculty expressed several reasons for protesting: the lack of faculty and student input into the decision, concerns that Pence's invitation was an endorsement of specific political and religious views, Pence's affiliation with President Donald Trump, and the belief that Pence did not represent the same Christian values the university endorsed. On May 18, 2019, dozens of students and several faculty members walked out of commencement ceremonies shortly before Pence delivered the commencement address. The majority of students and faculty remained seated. At the end of his speech, Pence received a standing ovation, during which the majority of students and faculty that remained stayed silent and seated. Afterwards, students linked hands and sang the doxology in an attempt to show that even if they have different viewpoints, they can still respect and love each other. On June 24, university president Haines resigned, effective August 15, 2019.

== Academics ==
Academic rankings

Regional
- U.S. News & World Report: 2

National
- Forbes: 233

There are 100 undergraduate programs, in 61 majors, with popular focuses including education, business, new media and exercise science.

Taylor offers graduate degrees, including in Higher Education / Higher Education Administration and Theological and Ministerial Studies. Taylor also offers a PhD in Leadership.

The concept of integration of faith and learning, the idea that knowledge and faith meet their highest potential when coupled together, is a central educational theme at Taylor. The two distinct columns of the Rice Bell Tower on campus and the spotlights that shine up from each of them symbolize this theme to the campus community.

=== Overseas campuses ===
Besides offering a number of off-campus programs, Taylor hosts two of its own study abroad programs – in Ecuador and Ireland. The Ecuador program is run through the university's Spencer Centre for Global Engagement and is based in Cuenca. The semester-long, immersion program involves a three-prong partnership with Taylor University, the Universidad del Azuay, and the Arco Church of Cuenca.

The Irish Studies Program is based at Stranmillis University in Belfast, Northern Ireland.

=== Accreditation and memberships ===
Taylor University is accredited by the Higher Learning Commission. Specific programs at the university are also accredited by the Council on Social Work Education, and the National Council for Accreditation of Teacher Education. Taylor's music program is accredited by the National Association of Schools of Music and programs in Computer Engineering and Engineering Physics are accredited by the Engineering Accreditation Commission of ABET.

== Campus life ==
=== Life Together Covenant ===
Students, faculty and staff are required to sign the "Life Together Covenant" (LTC) upon joining the university. Community members pledge to adhere to certain standards of conduct and refrain from certain behaviors, including social dancing (excepting marriages taking place off of school property and choreographed or folk dance), premarital sex, homosexuality, smoking, and the consumption of alcohol, with the intention of strengthening the community as a whole. The LTC is viewed as not only a covenant, but as a binding contract as well. Penalties for not adhering to the LTC range from "citizenship probation" to expulsion from the university. In 2013 the dancing rule was modified to allow officially sanctioned school dances.

The Life Together Covenant covers activities and behaviors not only on the Taylor campus, but off-campus as well. The purpose is to strengthen the Christian community and to maintain a sense of maturity and accountability.

Chapel services are held three times a week, from 10:00 to 10:50 a.m. on Monday, Wednesday, and Friday. Services generally follow a modern nontraditional Christian theme. Chapel attendance is encouraged but attendance is on the honor system. Chapel is always well attended.

=== Multicultural development ===
Multicultural students are supported by the Office of Intercultural Programs, and other faculty and staff through various student leadership groups, social clubs, and programs on campus. Programs include International Student Society, Multicultural Student Association, Mu Kappa International (founded at Taylor in 1985), Asian Society for Intercultural Awareness, Black Student Union, Middle Eastern Cultural Association, Voices of Praise Gospel Choir, and Latino Student Union. These groups and their subsequent events and programs play a role the university's goal of "promoting diversity awareness, social justice, and globally minded Christianity throughout the campus".

== Campus facilities ==
=== Academic facilities ===
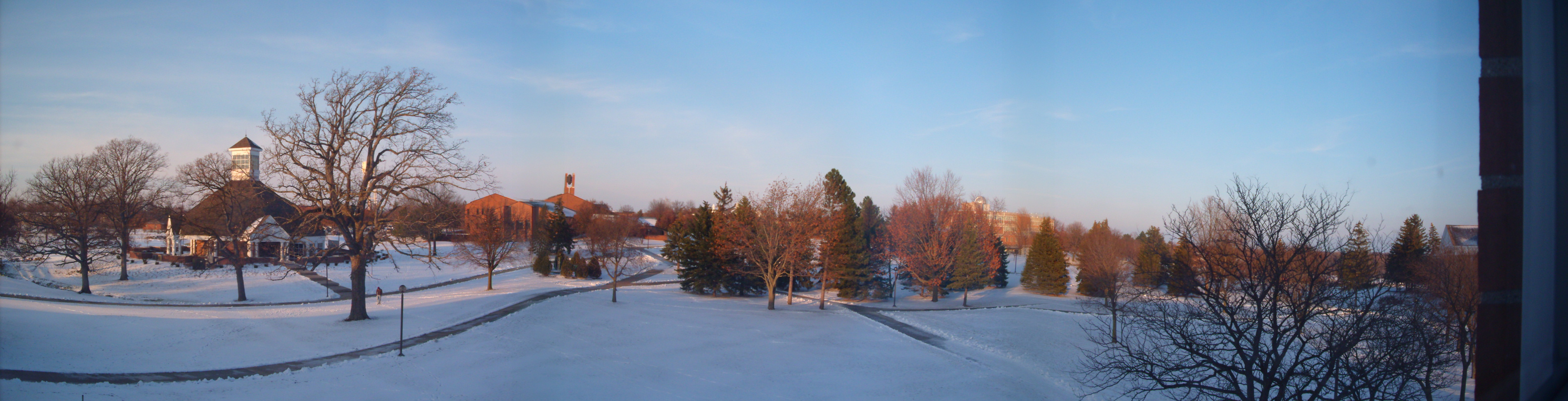
View of campus from Wengatz Hall. Left to Right: Memorial Prayer Chapel, Zondervan Library, Nussbaum Science Center and Olson Hall.

In 1902, Sickler Hall, the oldest of three remaining original buildings on the campus, was built with a gift from the estate of Christopher Sickler, an early Taylor trustee. Originally, the building was a residence hall that provided free housing for the children of ministers and missionaries. Later, it served as a science hall and educational department center; more recently, it was the location of the communication arts department. Remodeled in 1995, Sickler Hall currently houses the William Taylor Foundation, professional writing department, and alumni and parent relations. A campus prayer chapel is located on the main floor and is open 24 hours a day for personal worship, meditation, and prayer.

In 1911, Helena Memorial Hall was built and is the second oldest building on campus. It serves as the university welcome center. The building was drastically remodeled in 1987 and houses Admissions and the Offices of the President and Provost. First a music building and then art and theatre building, this building is named for Mrs. Helena Gehman, an early benefactress to the university.

In 1986, Zondervan Library was opened and is a sprawling 61,000-square-foot (5,700 m^{2}) complex at the center of campus. Named in honor of Peter J. "Pat" Zondervan and his wife, Mary, who contributed over $1 million to the project. Part of the complex is the Engstrom Galleria and Special Collections & University Archives which houses the British Author Collections. The collections consist of first editions, manuscripts, photographs, and other materials related to the lives and works of the five collected authors: C.S. Lewis, George MacDonald, Dorothy Sayers, Charles Williams, and Owen Barfield.

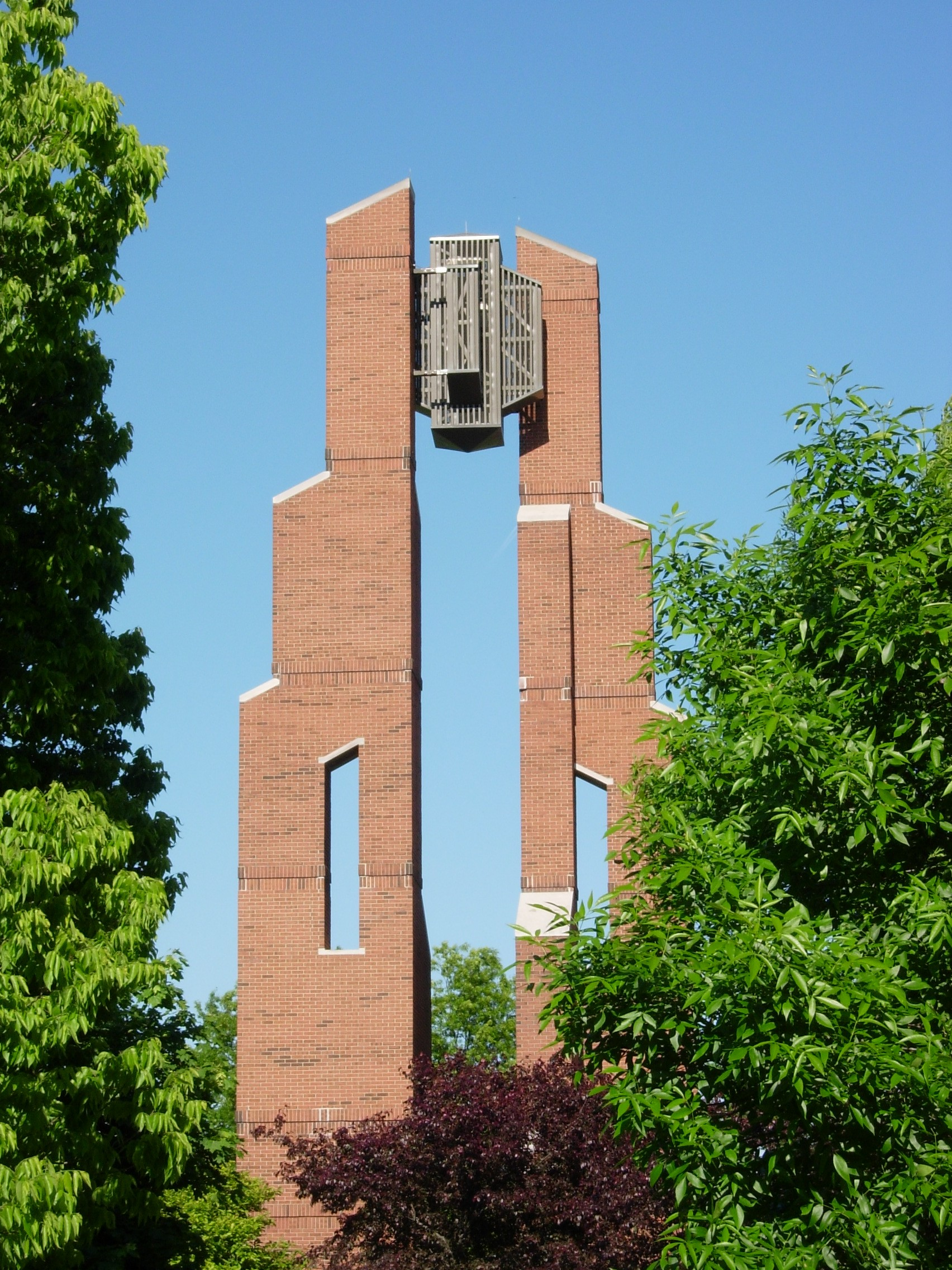
Rice Bell Tower

Sitting beside the library complex is the Rice Bell Tower. It is one of the distinctive architectural elements to the campus and stands at 71 feet, 10 inches in height. (The "bell" tower contains no bells, merely loudspeakers contained inside painted metal boxes.) It was dedicated in memory of Garnet I. Rice's husband, Raymond. The twin spires of the tower that meet at the apex of the structure symbolize the integration of faith and learning.

On the west side of campus is the Jim Wheeler Memorial Stadium with a seating capacity of 4,000. It has been the home of Trojan football since its completion in 1980. It was built with funds donated by 1954 alumnus John Wheeler in memory of his son, Jim Wheeler, an aspiring Christian recording artist who died of cancer shortly after his graduation from the university in 1979.

In 1958, the Taylor University Dome was designed by Orus Eash and built. It originally was the campus cafeteria, and later served as the student union. In June 2022, the building was demolished to make way for a new film and entrepreneurship building.

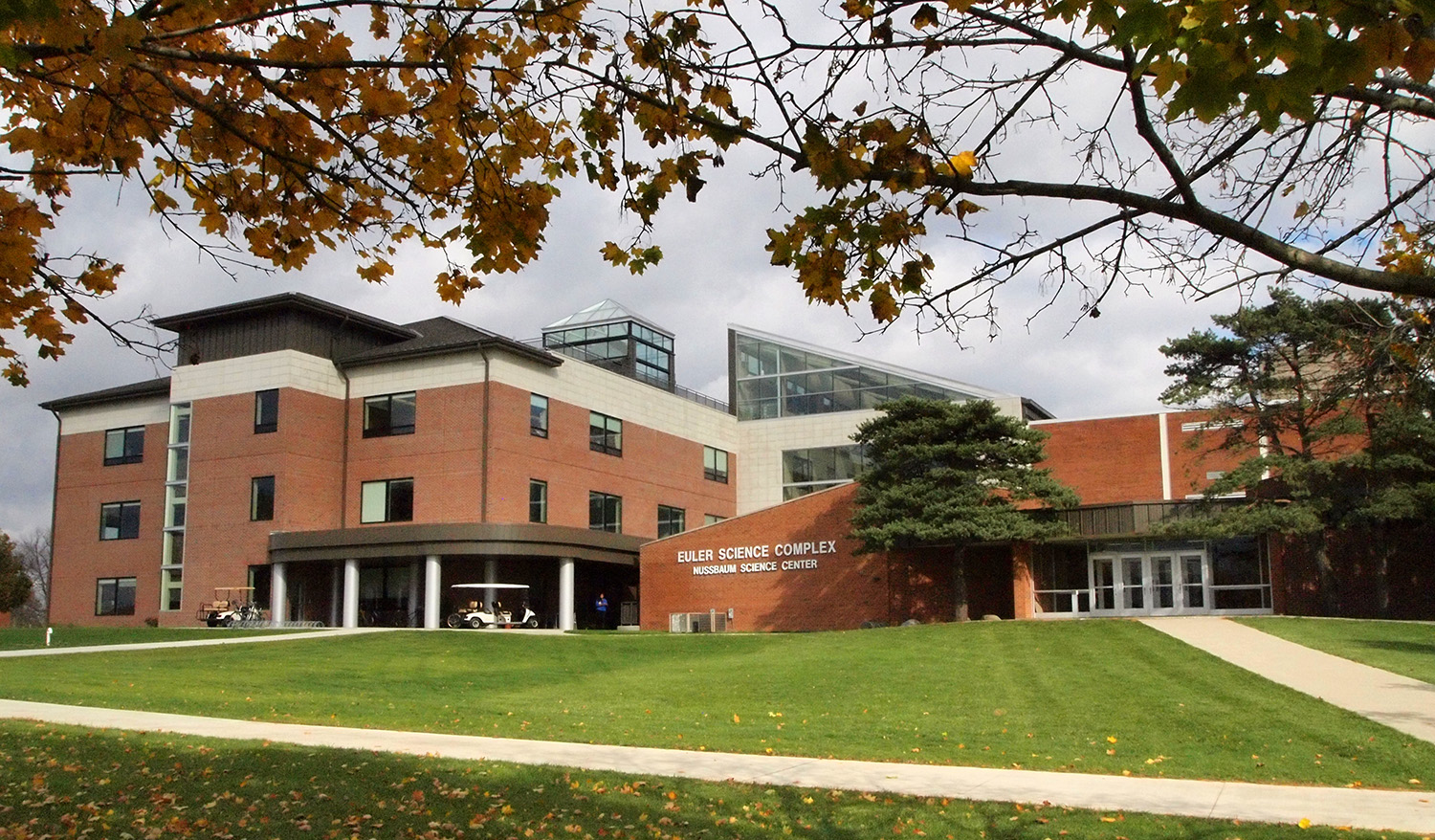
Euler Science Complex and Nussbaum Science Center

In 2003, the Modelle Metcalf Visual Arts Center opened and includes 38,000 square feet (3,500 m^{2}) of art studios, computer design labs, teaching auditoriums, and art galleries.

In 2004, the Kesler Student Activity Center (KSAC, named after president emeritus Jay Kesler), was completed and features 88,000 square feet of athletic activities space, including an indoor track, multi-purpose courts used for intramural sports, an exercise room, an aerobics room, and multiple locker rooms.

In January 2011, the Eichling Aquatics Wing was completed and includes a lap pool and several classrooms and offices.

In 2010, the university began a massive $41.1 million, 137,000-square-foot (12,700 m^{2}) addition to its Nussbuam science education complex on the south-east side of campus. The building was completed in time for the 2012 fall semester and dedicated during Homecoming weekend. Named the Euler Science Complex, the center featured two wind turbines; and still features a heliostat, green roofing, geothermal heating and cooling, and solar paneling. With an emphasis on sustainable energy, the university hopes not only to save energy and costs, but also to use these features as a teaching tool. The university has received a Gold LEED certification for the new complex.

=== Residence halls ===
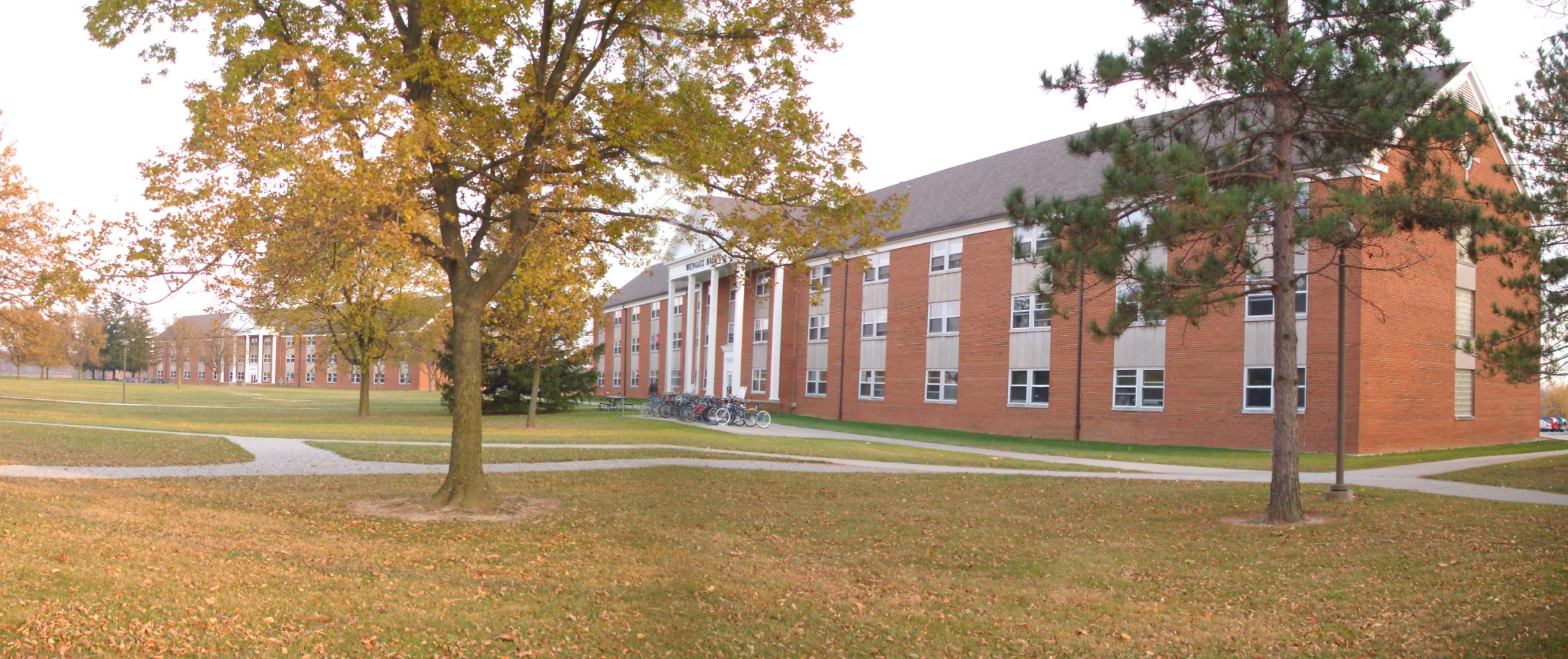
Olson Hall (left) and Wengatz Hall (right)

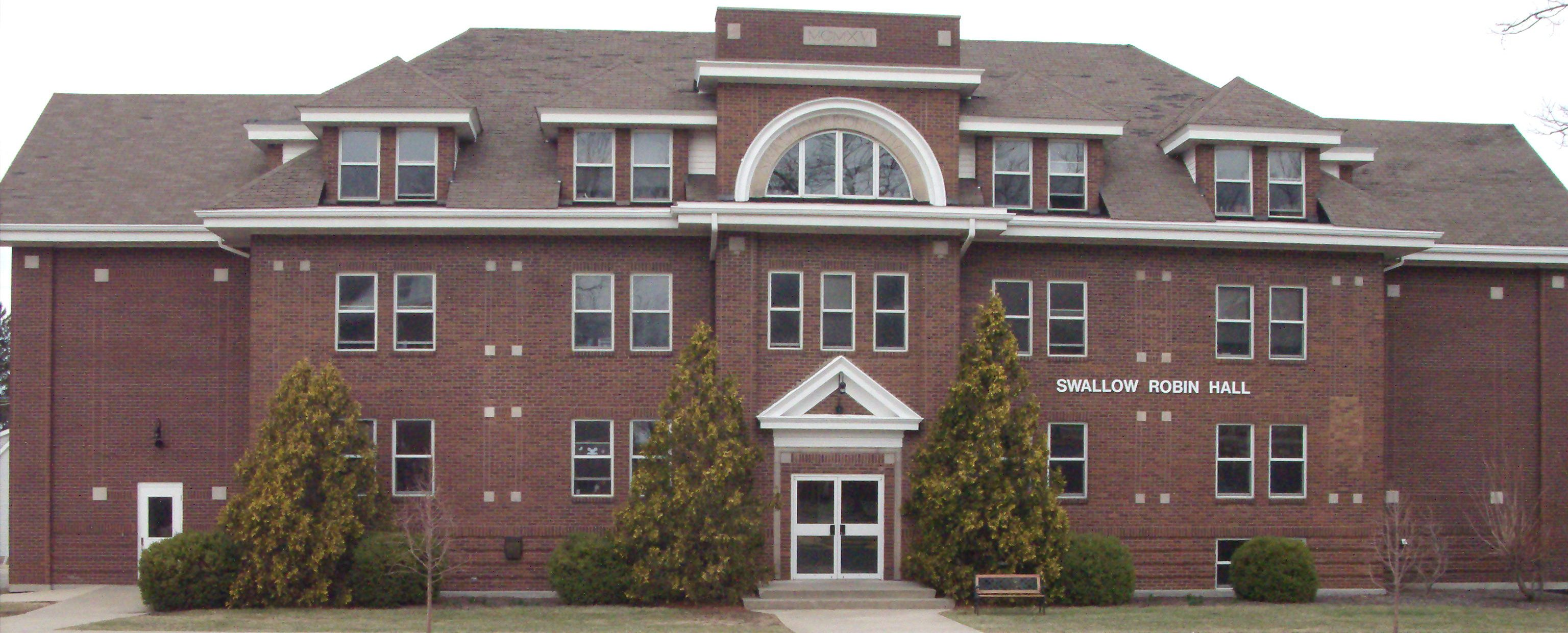
Swallow Robin Hall

Bergwall Hall, 1989, was occupied and named for Evan Bergwall Sr., president of Taylor University (1951–1959) during the fall semester of 1989 and currently houses 195 students—women on the third and fourth floors and men on the first and second floors. Each floor has a lounge and study facilities and communal bathrooms.

Breuninger Hall was opened to students in 2013 and is the newest residence hall. Located on the south side of campus, it houses 150 students across one floor of men and two floors of women.

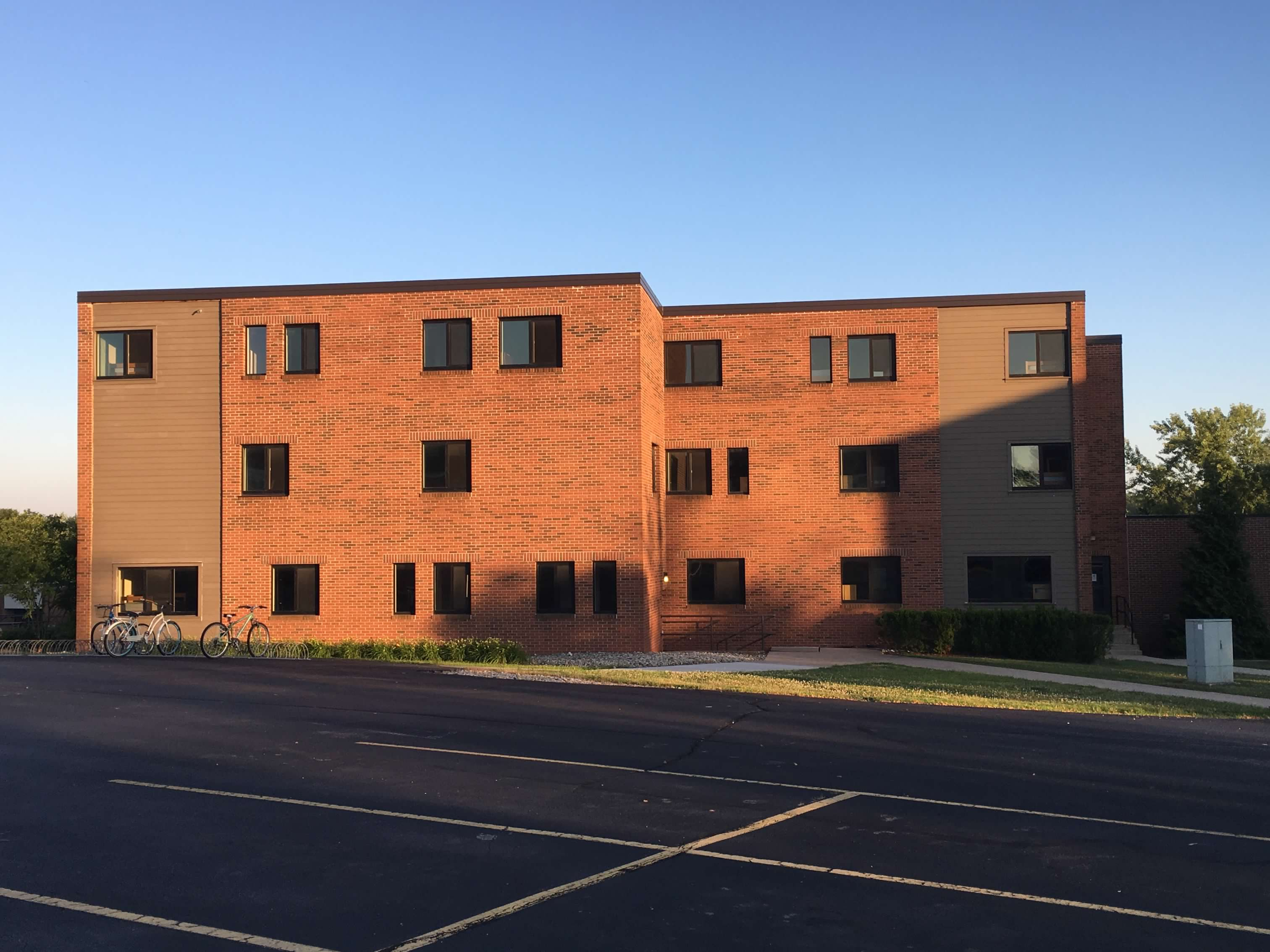
English Hall

English Hall, 1975, opened on the far south end of campus, is a women's residence hall housing 224 students. It is named for Mary Tower English, the spouse of one of Taylor's most distinguished graduates. English Hall provides private living room areas as rooms are arranged around a suite that is shared by 8–12 women. It is of a unique compartmental brutalism architecture.

Olson Hall was constructed in the 1960s and named in honor of long-time and distinguished history professor Grace D. Olson. It is the largest residence hall (in terms of housing) on the campus with 300 beds. The hall underwent major renovations between 2006 and 2008. The hall is arranged along a typical corridor with a shared common bath.

Mirrored by Olson is Wengatz Hall, 1965, named for alumnus John C. Wengatz, a pioneer missionary to Africa. It houses 266 men.

Samuel Morris Hall, 1990, was completed, and colloquially referred to as “Sammy,” and named in honor of late 19th century African student Samuel Morris and is the university's most modern large-scale residence hall and its largest in terms of square feet. It sits on the northeast corner of campus and houses 309 men. It is the third building named after Morris, the second being demolished in the mid-1990s. The building has four floors, each with its own unique culture and traditions: Foundation, Sammy II, The Brotherhood, and Penthouse.

Swallow Robin Hall, 1917, is the oldest residence hall and third oldest building on campus by Samuel Plato. and then remodeled and restored in the fall of 1990. Silas C. Swallow and his wife (maiden name Robin) financed a major portion of the original construction cost for the building and asked that it be named in honor of their mothers. The hall was designed by Samuel Plato, a notable architect of the early 20th century.

Most recently, the university added two new off-campus housing apartment halls on the north side of campus:

- Campell Hall, 2008, at 19,167-square-foot (1,780.7 m^{2}) was constructed in 2008 and opening that fall, is named in honor of Walt and Mary Campbell. It is located on the northwest edge of campus and consists of fifteen apartments housing 60 upper-level students in an apartment-style setting.
- Wolgemuth Hall, 2011, the larger, opened in fall of 2011 and incorporates the architectural style of Samuel Plato. At 35,970 square feet (3,342 m^{2}) it has room for 92 upper-level students and is named after Sam and Grace Wolgemuth.

Haakonsen Hall, 1975, was constructed as the student health center. The building is named after medical care provider Lily Haakonsen who was employed by the university. In 2006 it was renovated and re-purposed as housing. Since then, it has served a variety of purposes and is currently home to Taylor University Media Services.

== Athletics ==
The Taylor athletic teams are called the Trojans. The university is a member of the National Association of Intercollegiate Athletics (NAIA), primarily competing in the Crossroads League (formerly known as the Mid-Central College Conference (MCCC) until after the 2011–12 school year) since the 1994–95 academic year. The Trojans previously competed in the Indiana Collegiate Athletic Conference (ICAC; now currently known as the Heartland Collegiate Athletic Conference (HCAC) since the 1998–99 school year) of the NCAA Division III ranks from 1987–88 to 1990–91.

Taylor competes in 16 intercollegiate varsity sports: Men's sports include baseball, basketball, cross country, football, golf, lacrosse, soccer and track & field; while women's sports include basketball, cross country, golf, soccer, softball, track & field and volleyball; and co-ed sports include competitive cheer. Former sports included men's and women's tennis.

=== Football ===
The Taylor football program competes in the Mideast League of the Mid-States Football Association. The Trojans football team ended the 2009 season ranked #19 in the NAIA coaches poll. After their first winning season since 2015, the Trojans football team finished the 2024 season ranked #22 in the NAIA coaches poll. The Trojans went 9–2, their second most wins in a season in program history.

=== Volleyball ===
The Taylor women's volleyball 2009 season ended in a single elimination game as part of the top 12 teams in the NAIA playoffs with the team ranked #11 in the NAIA.

=== Cross country ===
The Taylor men's cross country team has qualified for NAIA nationals 32 times. They ran to a runner-up finish in 2019 and went on to win nationals in 2020 giving Taylor its first NAIA national championship in any sport. The program has also won 22 Conference Championships.

The Taylor women's cross country team has qualified for NAIA nationals 15 times. They ran to a third-place finish in both 2018 and 2020. In 2022 the Trojans ran to an undefeated season and won NAIA nationals scoring only 50 points after being led by fourth-place finisher Abbey Brennan and having all five scoring runners finish in the top 20. The program also has 12 conference championships including ten in a row from 2013 to 2022.

Both teams are currently coached by Taylor alumni and Taylor professor of education Quinn White. Coach White won the USTFCCCA NAIA Men's National Coach of the year award in 2021 and proceeded to win the women's award in 2022. Coach White has also been named Crossroads League coach of the year ten times as well as being named the USTFCCCA Great Lakes Region coach of the year multiple times.

=== Basketball ===
==== Silent Night ====
Every year the Friday before final exams, Taylor University has the Silent Night Men's Basketball game. In it, students remain quiet until the tenth point is scored and then erupt in cheering. In the late moments of the game, "Silent Night" is sung. A former assistant coach came up with the idea in the late 80s and it was a packed event by the mid-to-late 1990s. Afterward, students can go to the President's campus-wide party involving live Christmas music, making and eating Christmas cookies, and making gingerbread houses. The 2010 game was more formally named the 27th Annual Ivanhoe Classic and resulted in a 112–67 win over Ohio State-Marion. This was the most scored by the Taylor men's basketball team since the 1993–94 squad scored 139 points in a victory over Robert Morris University (Illinois). This allowed Taylor students to quiet down and erupt in celebration again after the 100th point. Coach Paul Patterson coached without shoes for the 2009, 2010, and 2011 games to raise money for Samaritan's Feet (400 pairs of shoes were raised at the 2009 event for the Dominican Republic and 170 pairs of shoes were raised for Guatemala at the 2010 event). Sports Illustrated paid tribute to the Silent Night Event in its December 27, 2010, issue. The 2011 game received significant media attention as well. The 2014 Silent Night game was a 91–59 victory over Kentucky Christian and was covered by ESPN.

== Media ==
Taylor university operates a radio station, WTUR, with student-led talk shows, student-selected music, and chapel services. Taylor University currently has entered into a partnership with and simulcasts WBCL on 87.9, the frequency WTUR used to broadcast on. Currently WTUR is solely broadcast online. Taylor also hosts a student newspaper, The Echo, which celebrated its 100th anniversary in 2012–13. The paper is both print and online. The Ilium, Taylor's annual yearbook, is a 200+ page print publication put together by students.

== Notable alumni and faculty ==
- Thomas Atcitty, third president of the Navajo Nation
- Andrew Belle, singer/songwriter
- Joseph Brain, physiologist and environmental health researcher at Harvard T.H. Chan School of Public Health
- Jason Burkey, actor
- Frank G. Carver, one of the translators of the New American Standard Bible
- Charles W. Clark, baritone singer
- Ralph Edward Dodge, Bishop of The Methodist Church
- Ted Engstrom, former president of World Vision International
- Stevimir Ercegovac, Olympic shot putter
- Rick Florian, recording artist
- Dan Gordon, president of Gordon Food Service
- John Groce, head coach of the Akron Zips men's basketball team
- Adolf Guttmacher, rabbi
- Eugene Habecker, president emeritus of Taylor University, former president of the American Bible Society
- Lowell Haines, lawyer, president emeritus of Taylor University
- Chris Holtmann, head coach of the DePaul Blue Demons men's basketball team
- Julienne Johnson, artist
- Stephen L. Johnson, former administrator of the Environmental Protection Agency
- Jay Kesler, president emeritus of Taylor University and former president of Youth for Christ
- Derek Kolstad, screenwriter
- D. Stephen Long, Methodist theologian and professor of ethics at Southern Methodist University
- Phil Madeira, award-winning songwriter and recording artist, and member of Emmylou Harris' band
- Rolland D. McCune, theologian and professor of Systematic Theology at Detroit Baptist Theological Seminary
- Jeff Meyer, former college coach
- Geoff Moore, contemporary Christian music artist, songwriter
- Samuel Morris, Prince Kaboo of Western Africa
- David Nixon, film director and producer
- Harold Ockenga, pastor, educator, and founding president of the National Association of Evangelicals
- Don Odle, coach
- Paris Reidhead, a Christian missionary, teacher, writer, and advocate of economic development in impoverished nations
- Charles Wesley Shilling, leader in the field of undersea and hyperbaric medicine, research and education
- Joel Sonnenberg, Christian motivational speaker
- John McKendree Springer Founder of the African Missionary movement in Africa
- William Vennard, vocal teacher and opera singer
- Tim Walberg, US Representative for Michigan's 7th congressional district
- Jackie Walorski, US Representative for Indiana's 2nd district (2013–2022), former Republican Indiana State Representative for District 21
- Robert Wolgemuth, author, former chairman of the Evangelical Christian Publishers Association

== List of university presidents ==
- Thaddeus Reade, 1891–1902
- Charles W. Winchester, 1904–1907
- Monroe Vayhinger, 1908–1921
- James M. Taylor, 1921–1922
- John H. Paul, 1922–1931
- Robert L. Stewart, 1931–1945
- Clyde W. Meredith, 1945–1951
- Evan H. Bergwall, 1951–1959
- B. Joseph Martin, 1960–1965
- Milo A. Rediger, 1965–1975; 1979–1981
- Robert C. Baptista, 1975–1979
- Gregg O. Lehman, 1981–1985
- Jay Kesler, 1985–2000
- David Gyertson, 2000–2005
- Eugene Habecker, 2005–2016
- Lowell Haines, 2016–2019
- Paige Comstock Cunningham, 2019–2021
- D. Michael Lindsay, 2021–present

== Gallery ==
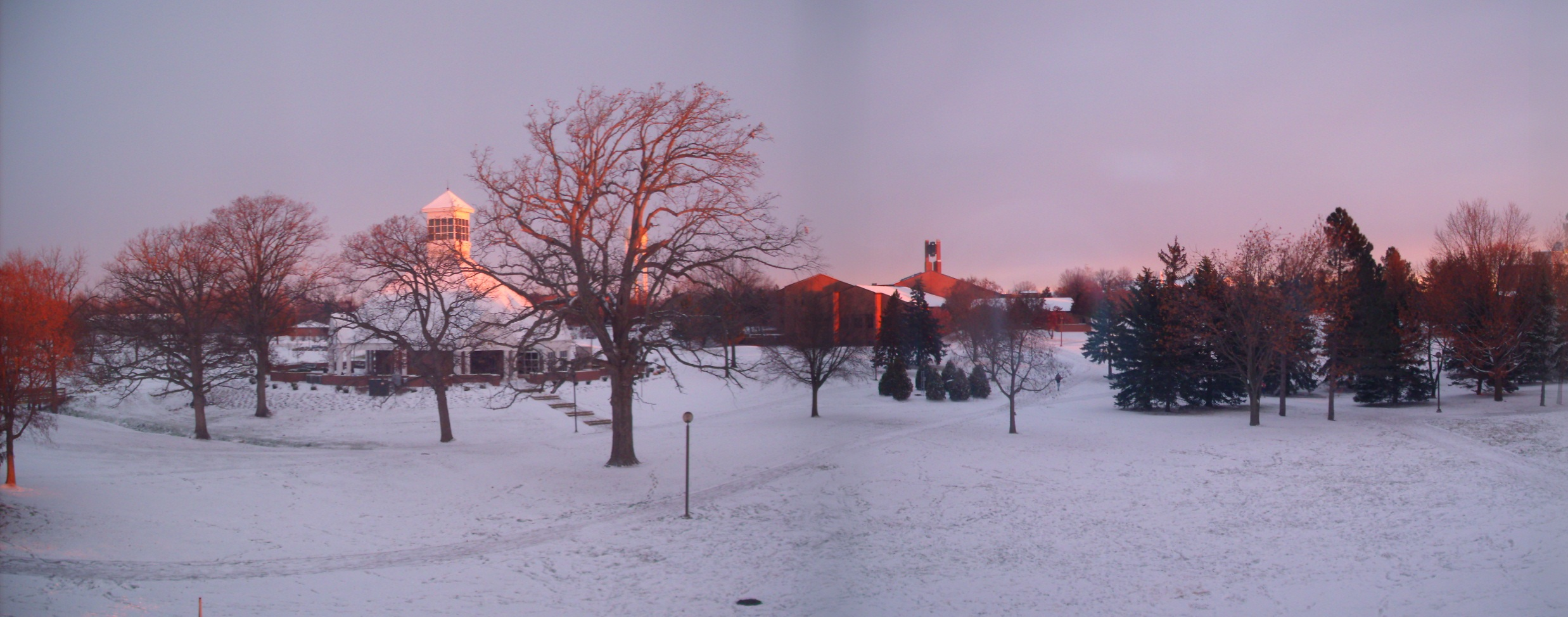
View of the prayer chapel and Zondervan Library from Wengatz during sunrise

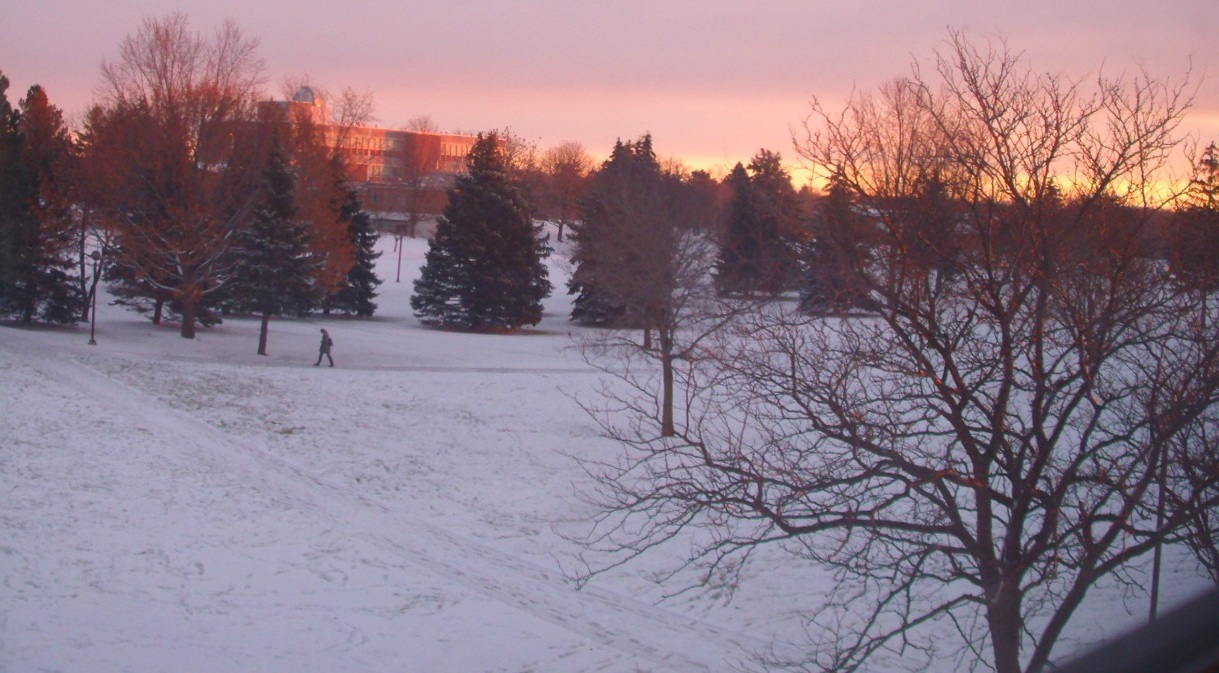
View of Nussbaum from Wengatz during sunrise

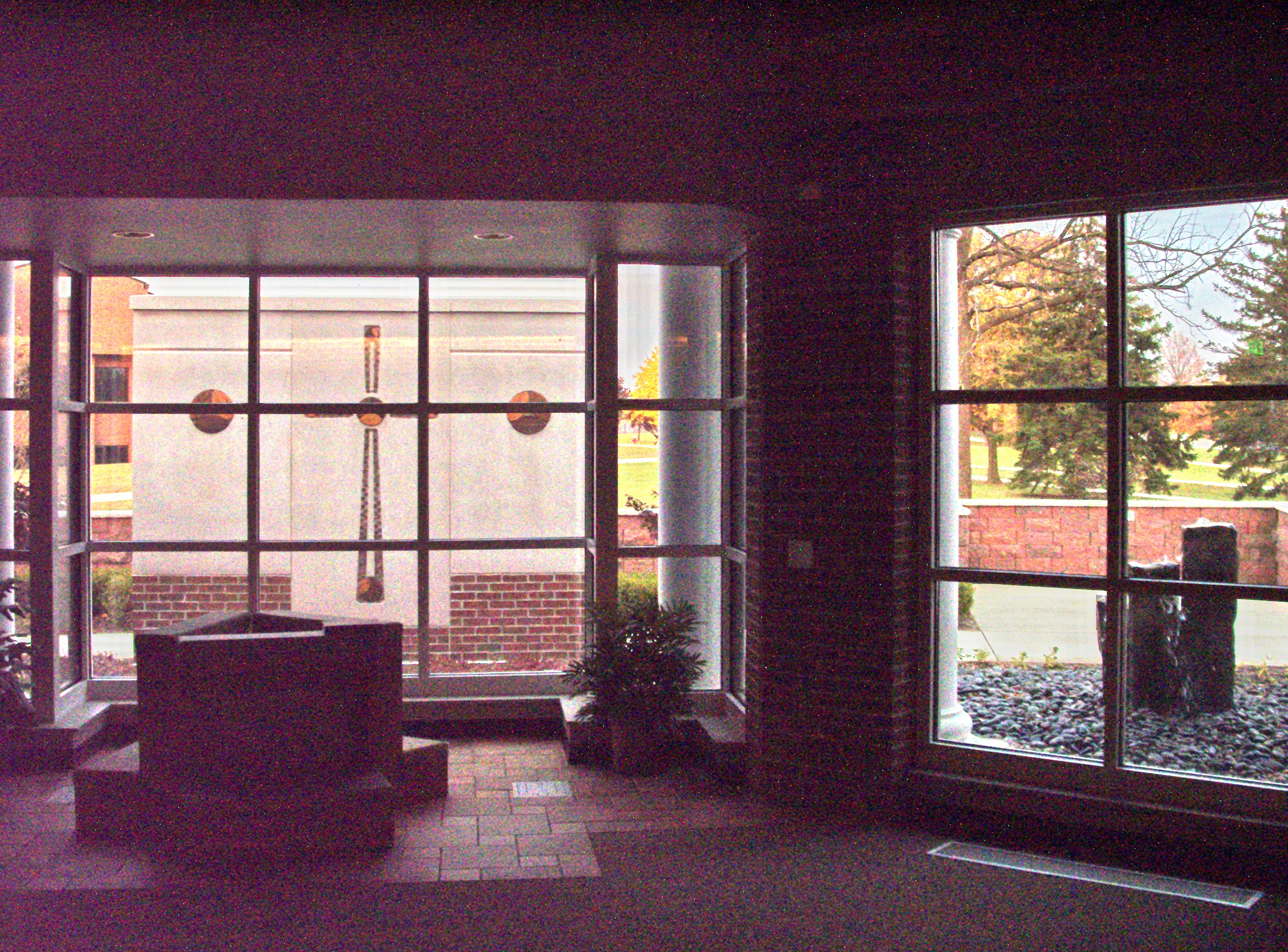
The Taylor University Memorial Prayer Chapel

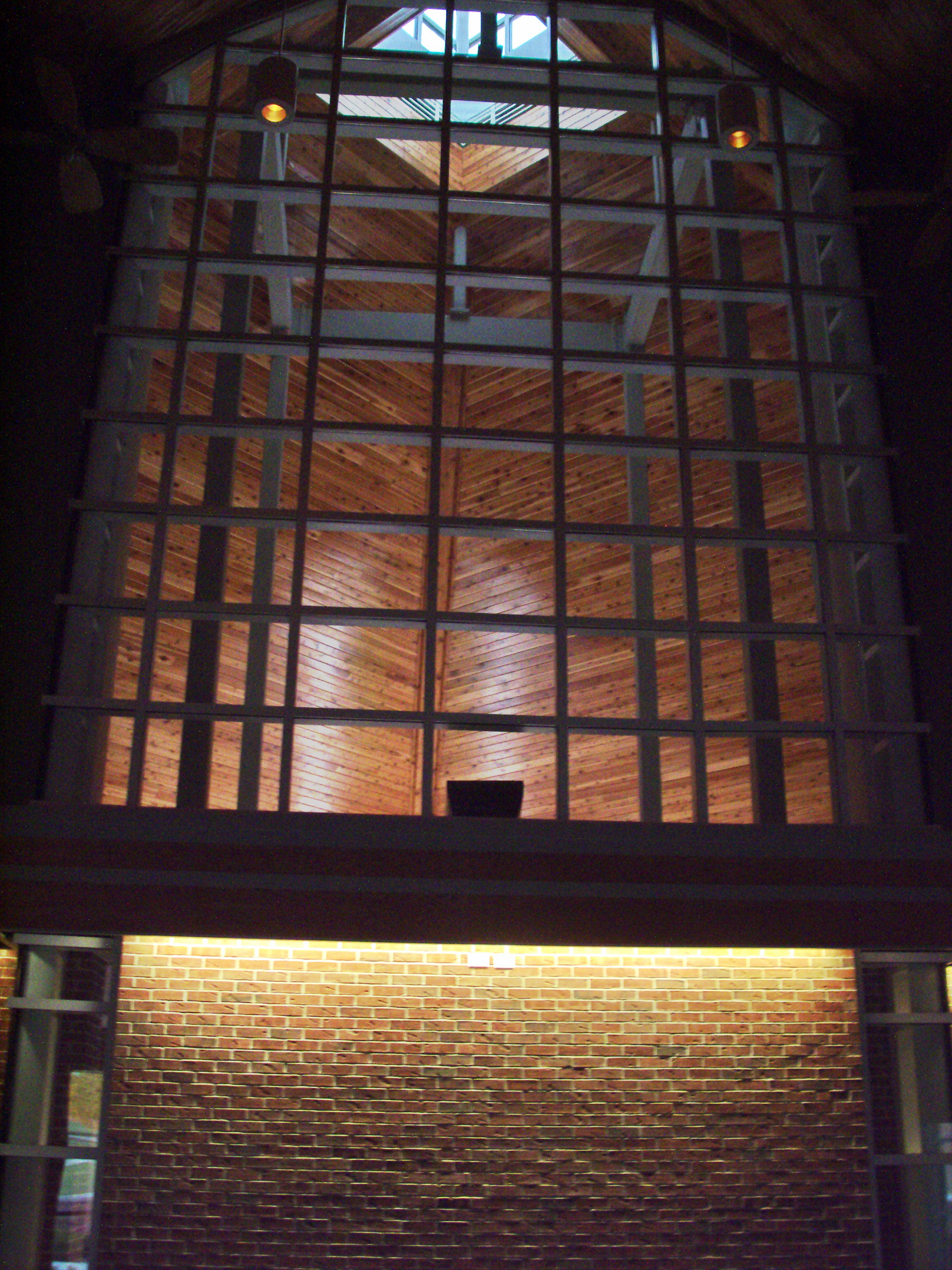

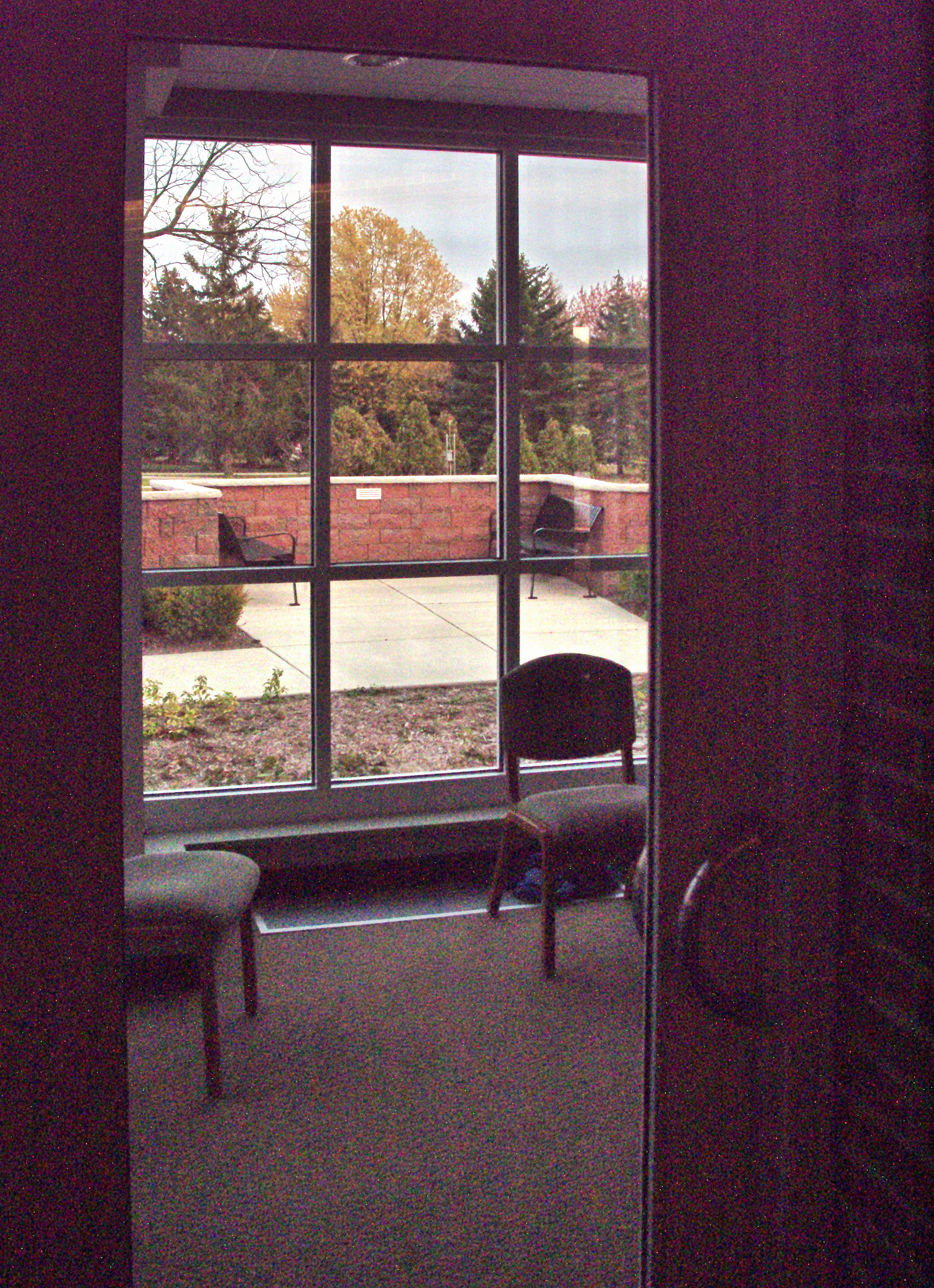

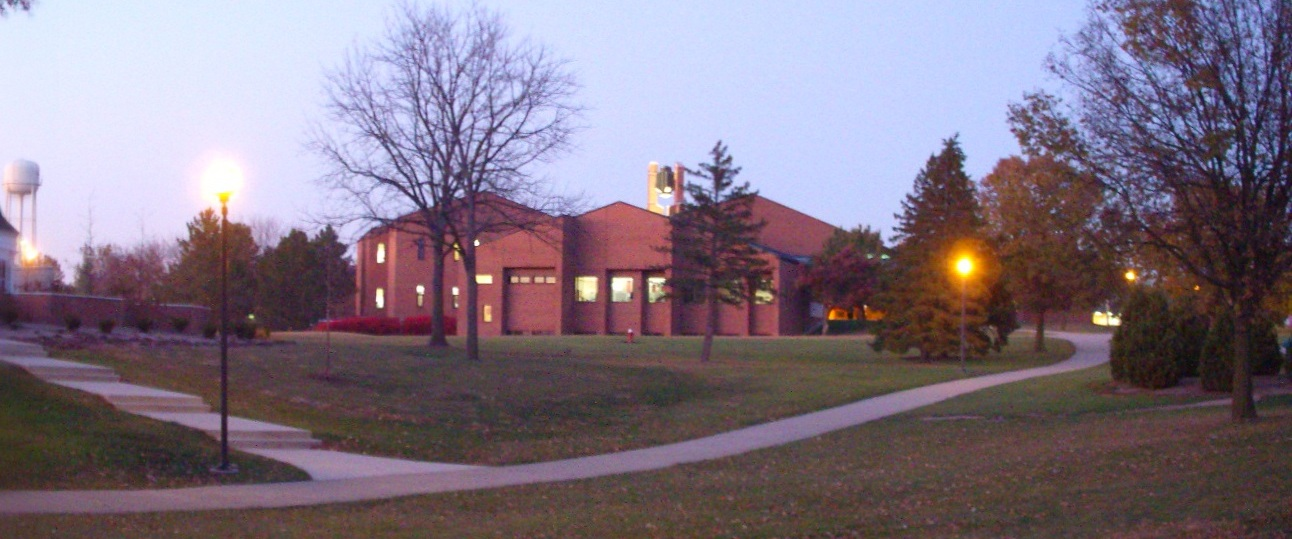
Zondervan Library
