= Mia Chung =

American pianist (born 1964)

- Born: October 1964 (age 61); Madison, Wisconsin, U.S.
- Education: Harvard College; Yale University; Juilliard School
- Occupations: Pianist; educator; writer
- Musical career
- Genres: Classical music, chamber music
- Instrument: Piano
- Years active: 1980–present
- Labels: Channel Classics Records; Tzadik Records; CAG Records
- Website: miachung.com

Mia Chung (born October 1964) is a concert pianist, educator and writer based in Philadelphia, Pennsylvania. She is also the Professor of Musical Studies and Performance at the Curtis Institute of Music in Philadelphia. Chung is the recipient of the Avery Fisher Career Grant and the winner of the Concert Artists Guild Award.

== Early life and education ==
Chung was born in Madison, Wisconsin, in 1964 and grew up in the Washington D.C. She started studying the piano at age of 8. She attended Harvard College in Cambridge, Massachusetts where she received a bachelor's degree in music in 1986. She also attended Yale School of Music and received a master's degree in 1988. In 1991, Chung received a doctoral degree in music from the Juilliard School. Her mentors have included Peter Serkin, Jacob Lateiner, Boris Berman, Leon Kirchner, Raymond Hanson, Anne Koscielny, Ilana Vered, and George Manos.

== Career ==
Chung began her performance career in the early 1980s. In 1981, she won International Johann Sebastian Bach Competition (junior division) in Washington, D.C. As a solo artist, Chung has performed with the Baltimore Symphony, National Symphony, Alabama Symphony, New Haven Symphony, Corpus Christi Symphony, Harrisburg Symphony, Boston Pops, Mainly Mozart Festival Orchestra, KBS Symphony Orchestra in Seoul, Seoul Philharmonic, Fort Collins Symphony, Cascade Festival Orchestra, Mostly Mozart Festival at Lincoln Center, Billings Symphony Orchestra, Pensacola Symphony Orchestra, West Michigan Symphony, and many others. Apart from that, she has played in many major concert halls around the world, including the John F. Kennedy Center for the Performing Arts in Washington, D.C., Symphony Hall in Boston, Jordan Hall in Boston, Sejong Center in Seoul, Korea, the Concertgebouw in Amsterdam, Weill Recital Hall at Carnegie Hall, Carnegie Hall (Pittsburgh), Krannert Center for the Performing Arts (University of Illinois), the Orange County Performing Arts Center, La Jolla Music Society, Yokohama Festival in Japan and Alice Tully Hall at Lincoln Center.

In 1993, Chung's debut recording, Beethoven: Sonatas and Bagatelles, Vol. I, was released on Channel Classics Records. The recording received positive reviews from several music outlets including Gramophone. In 1996, her second recording, Robert Schumann, consisting of Robert Schumann's works, was released on Channel Classics Records. The recording won the Critics Association of Korea Award in the Best Keyboard Recording of the Year category. In 1997 and 1999, Channel Classics released two more recordings of Chung's work, Beethoven: Sonatas and Bagatelles, Vol. II and Goldberg Variations featuring Johann Sebastian Bach's works. Later in 2000, Chung recorded and released a work by the composer Lee Hyla called Riff and Transfiguration on Tzadik Records. Her debut DVD recording, A Composer's Response to Crisis: Beethoven's Pianos Sonatas, Op. 53 and Op.110: Analysis, Demonstration, and Performance was released in 2008 which included her performances and analyses of Ludwig van Beethoven’s Piano Sonatas, Op. 53 and Op. 110. In 2013, Chung collaborated with Alina Polyakov and released Sync Op.: 20th Century Dance Tunes, a collection of works by Samuel Barber, Maurice Ravel and Sergei Rachmaninoff. In 2015, CAG Records recorded and released Chung's seventh recording, Brahms Piano Trios, featuring Soo Bae and Elizabeth Larson.

Over her forty years of professional career, Chung has collaborated with several notable artists such as Bernard Greenhouse, William Preucil, Philip Setzer, Ani Kavafian, Ida Kavafian, David Shifrin, Carol Wincenc, Paul Neubauer and Hillary Hahn. In 1993, Chung was chosen as an Artistic Ambassador by the United States Information Agency and toured Thailand, Singapore, Tonga and the former Soviet Union. She was also a member of the Chamber Music Society of Lincoln Center between 1996 and 1998. Chung is also the winner of the Concert Artists Guild Award in 1993 and the recipient of the Avery Fisher Career Grant in 1997.

Chung has also appeared on radio as the first Young Artist in Residence for National Public Radio's Performance Today in 1996. This led to her nomination as NPR's Debut Artist of the Year in 1997. She later served as Artist-in-Radio, WGMS-FM (Washington, D.C.) and WCRB (Boston) from 1996-1997.

From 1991 to 2011, Chung was Artist-in-Residence and Professor of Music at Gordon College in Wenham, Massachusetts. She is currently serving as the Professor of Musical Studies and Performance at the Curtis Institute of Music. In 2020, Chung founded the Octet Collaborative, a non-profit that promotes human flourishing at MIT.

== Discography and publication ==
Albums
| Year | Title | Label | Notes |
|---|---|---|---|
| 1993 | Beethoven: Sonatas and Bagatelles, Vol. I | Channel Classics Records | - |
| 1996 | Robert Schumann | Channel Classics Records | Collection of Robert Schumann's work |
| 1997 | Beethoven: Sonatas and Bagatelles, Vol. II | Channel Classics Records | - |
| 1999 | Bach, J.S.: Goldberg Variations, BWV 988 | Channel Classics Records | Featuring Johann Sebastian Bach's works |
| 2000 | Lee Hyla: Riff and Transfiguration | Tzadik Records | Collection of works by Lee Hyla |
| 2013 | Sync Op.: 20th Century Dance Tune | - | Featuring Alina Polyakov |
| 2017 | Brahms Piano Trios | CAG Records | Featuring Soo Bae and Elizabeth Larson |

DVD
| Year | Title | Production |
|---|---|---|
| 2008 | A Composer's Response to Crisis: Beethoven's Pianos Sonatas, Op. 53 and Op.110: Analysis, Demonstration, and Performance | Mallozzi Productions |

Publications
| Year | Title | Publisher | Notes |
|---|---|---|---|
| 2015 | The World of the String Quartet | Coursera | Co-written with Arnold Steinhardt |
