= Samuel Kaboo Morris =

Liberian-American preacher

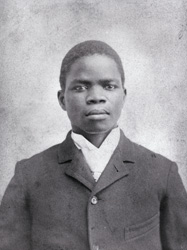
- Samuel Kaboo Morris
- Born: 1873; Liberia
- Died: May 12, 1893 (aged 19–20); United States
- Education: Taylor University

Samuel Kaboo Morris (1873 – May 12, 1893) was a Liberian prince who converted to evangelical Christianity around the age of 14. He left Liberia for the United States of America to achieve an education at around the age of 18. He arrived at Taylor University in December 1891. A residence hall at Taylor bearing his name now exists. He died on May 12, 1893 after contracting pneumonia.

Morris's life has been the subject of five novels, a number of biographies, a film, and a documentary. Taylor University dedicated three on-campus bronze statues depicting key moments in Samuel Morris's life and has named numerous buildings, scholarships, and a society in his honor. His story has helped to inspire others to go to Africa to preach the Gospel.

== Early life ==
Samuel Kaboo Morris was born in Liberia in 1873. Little is recorded of his early life. Kaboo was a prince in the Kru tribe. When he was 14 years old, his tribe, the Kru, was attacked by the Grebos. Kaboo was captured and used as a "pawn." The Grebos forced the Kru to pay each month in order to be able to see Kaboo and ensure his safety. Kaboo's father, the chief, came each time, but the Grebos consistently refused what he brought. Finally, the Kru could bring no more and Kaboo began to be tortured every day.

During one of his beatings, there was a flash of light, and a voice told Kaboo to flee. The ropes that bound him fell off, and his sick body gained strength. He fled to the jungle, where he wandered for days, living off snails and mangos, until he came to a coffee plantation. Kaboo began to work for the owner of the plantation, and a former slave who had come to Liberia.

While living on the plantation, he began to attend church, where he was taught by missionaries. After hearing the Biblical narrative of Saul's conversion, where a man encountered a blinding light, Kaboo converted to Christianity. He was baptized and took the name Samuel Morris after a mentor of one of the missionaries.

Morris was motivated to travel to America as he learned more about God, whom he had encountered. The missionaries told him about Stephen Merritt, a Christian teacher in New York. Morris declared "I am going to New York."

After waiting at the docks for several days, Morris eventually found passage on a ship to New York in exchange for work. On board, he was abused and beaten again, but he endured with patience and forgiveness. The crew saw Morris pray frequently, even during dangerous storms. Their curiosity piqued by the profound peace that Morris exuded, the crew were attracted to Christianity. Many converted, and by the end of the five-month journey across the Atlantic, the crew was radically different.

== Life in the United States ==
In the States, Morris found Stephen Merritt. Impressed by his anointing and confidence, Merritt invited Morris to stay at his house. In a time where racism against Africans was widely accepted, the community which encountered Morris instead saw that God was working in him and created the Samuel Morris Missionary Society to collect funds to send Morris to college so he could study the Bible. He enrolled at Taylor University, in Fort Wayne, Indiana.

While at Taylor University, Morris encouraged many people in their faith. Students frequently asked to pray with him. People from around the world would come to hear him speak. He was known to spend hours in prayer with God, from late at night to early in the morning. Newspapers printed stories of "the boy from Africa who was charging Fort Wayne with the electric power of God." Morris was an active member of Berry Street Methodist Episcopal Church and regularly attended East Wayne Street Methodist Episcopal Church.

== Death ==
Morris desired to be educated in Biblical literature in order to return to Liberia as a missionary. However, late in 1892, he suffered a case of pneumonia that would eventually end his life. Samuel is reported to have said, "It is not my work [to go to Liberia]. It is His. I have finished my job. He will send others better than I to do the work in Africa." On May 12, 1893, at approximately 20 years of age, Samuel Morris, died. Fellow students served as pallbearers at his funeral. After his funeral, many of them said they felt led to go to Africa to be missionaries in Samuel's place.

At the time, it was customary to bury Blacks in the "Negro" section of the cemetery. However, Samuel's body was later moved to the center of the cemetery, linking Blacks and Whites in death like he did in life. A memorial is placed at his gravesite that reads:

Samuel Morris
1873-1893

Prince Kaboo
Native of West Africa
Apostle of Simple Faith
Exponent of the Spirit-filled life

Student at Taylor University 1892-3
Fort Wayne, now located at Upland,
Indiana. The story of his life
a vital contribution to the
development of Taylor University.
The erection of this memorial
was sponsored by the 1928 class
Taylor University and funds
were contributed by Fort Wayne
citizens.
