= Eugene Habecker =

Dr. Eugene B. Habecker is the President Emeritus of Taylor University and chairman of Christianity Today. Previously, Habecker served as the 30th president of Taylor University, as well as president of the American Bible Society. He is also the author of several books, two coauthored with his wife, Marylou Habecker. He was inaugurated in a ceremony on Friday, April 28, 2006, in Odle Arena on the Upland campus, only two days after a tragic fatal car accident involving several students and employees.

Habecker was born on June 17, 1946, near Hershey, Pennsylvania. He earned a B.A. from Taylor University in 1968, a M.A. from Ball State University in 1969, a law degree from Temple University in 1973, and a Ph.D. from the University of Michigan in 1981. He has served in administrative positions at Huntington, George Fox University (Newberg, Ore.) and Eastern University (St. Davids, Pa., 1970–74), as assistant dean of student affairs, assistant athletic director and the men's cross-country team coach. From 1981 through 1991 Habecker served as the President of Huntington College in Huntington, Indiana. From 1991 through 2005 he served as the president and CEO of the American Bible Society in New York City. Habecker served as president of Taylor University from August 2005 until May 2016. In June 2016, Habecker was named president emeritus of Taylor University.

== See also ==
- Rediscovering the Soul of Leadership, ISBN 1-56476-536-9
- Affirmative action in the independent college: A practical planning model, ASIN: B0006CVUXS
- Stand in the Gap: a sacred assembly of men, commemorative edition new testament ASIN: B000BNZOBG
- The Other Side of Leadership ISBN 0-89693-341-5
- Government financial assistance, religious colleges, and the First Amendment: A call for a new constitutional alliance, ASIN: B0007274NM
- Private religious colleges and the state: The search for a constitutional alliance, ASIN:B0007AS30W
