= Marvin R. Wilson =

American biblical scholar

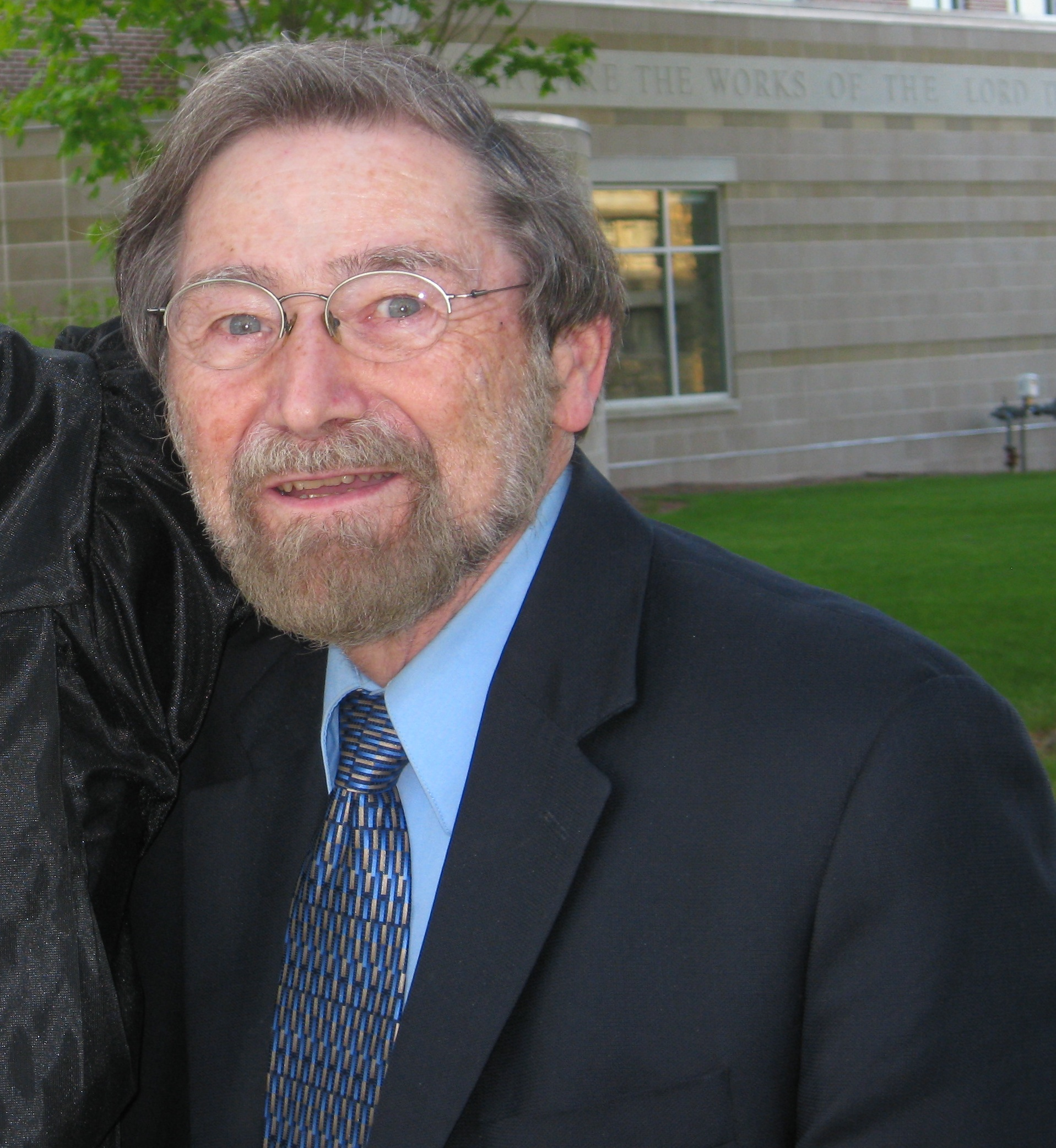
Dr. Marvin R. Wilson at Gordon College's 2010 Baccalaureate.

Marvin R. Wilson is an American evangelical Biblical scholar, and was the Harold J. Ockenga Professor of Biblical and Theological Studies at Gordon College in Wenham, Massachusetts until his 2018 retirement.

== Education ==
Wilson graduated from Wheaton College (A.B., cum laude), Gordon-Conwell Theological Seminary (M.Div., summa cum laude) and Brandeis University (M.A., Ph.D.).

== Career ==
Wilson taught at Barrington College and chaired its Department of Biblical Studies. He become a professor at Gordon in 1971, a position he held until his retirement in 2018. He taught Old Testament, Hebrew, Jewish history and culture, and modern Judaism. He also served as an Old Testament translator and editor of the New International Version Bible as well as contributing notes to two of the Old Testament books in the NIV Study Bible. Apart from writing over 200 articles or reviews Wilson is also a frequent speaker in synagogues, conferences, and on TV and radio. One of Wilson's most notable contributions is his textbook Our Father Abraham: Jewish Roots of the Christian Faith which is in its 29th printing. Foreign translations include French, Italian, Czech, Chinese, Japanese and Korean. Wilson has also co-edited 3 books on Jewish-Christian relations: Evangelicals and Jews in Conversation, Evangelicals and Jews in an Age of Pluralism, and A Time to Speak: The Evangelical-Jewish Encounter. He also served as primary scholar for the award-winning, two-hour national public TV documentary Jews & Christians: A Journey of Faith.

Wilson joined Edwin Yamauchi (Professor of History emeritus, Miami University) as co-editor and author of the four-volume reference work Dictionary of Daily Life in Biblical and Post-biblical Antiquity (Hendrickson Publishers, 2014–16).

A collection of twenty essays written by Christian and Jewish scholars was presented as a surprise to Wilson at a Gordon College commencement. This Festschrift is titled Perspectives on Our Father Abraham in Honor of Marvin R. Wilson (ed. Steven A. Hunt, Grand Rapids: Wm. B. Eerdmans Publishing Co., 2012).

== Personal life ==
Wilson is married to Polly, a pianist.

== Selected books ==
- Evangelicals and Jews in Conversation, Baker Book House, 1978. Co-edited with Marc H. Tanenbaum and A. James Rudin.
- Evangelicals and Jews in an Age of Pluralism, Baker Publishing Group, 1984. Co-edited with Marc H. Tanenbaum and A. James Rudin.
- A Time to Speak: The Evangelical-Jewish Encounter, Eerdmans, 1987. Co-edited with A. James Rudin
- Our Father Abraham: Jewish Roots of the Christian Faith, Eerdmans, 1989.
- A Workbook for New Testament Greek: Grammar and Exegesis in First John, Hendrickson, 1998. Co-edited with Chris A. Vlachos.
- Exploring Our Hebraic Heritage: A Christian Theology of Roots and Renewal, Eerdmans, 2014.
- Dictionary of Daily Life in Biblical & Post-biblical Antiquity, 4 volumes, Hendrickson, 2014–16.
- Our Father Abraham: Jewish Roots of the Christian Faith, 2nd ed., Eerdmans, 2021.
