= D. Michael Lindsay =

American sociologist and administrator

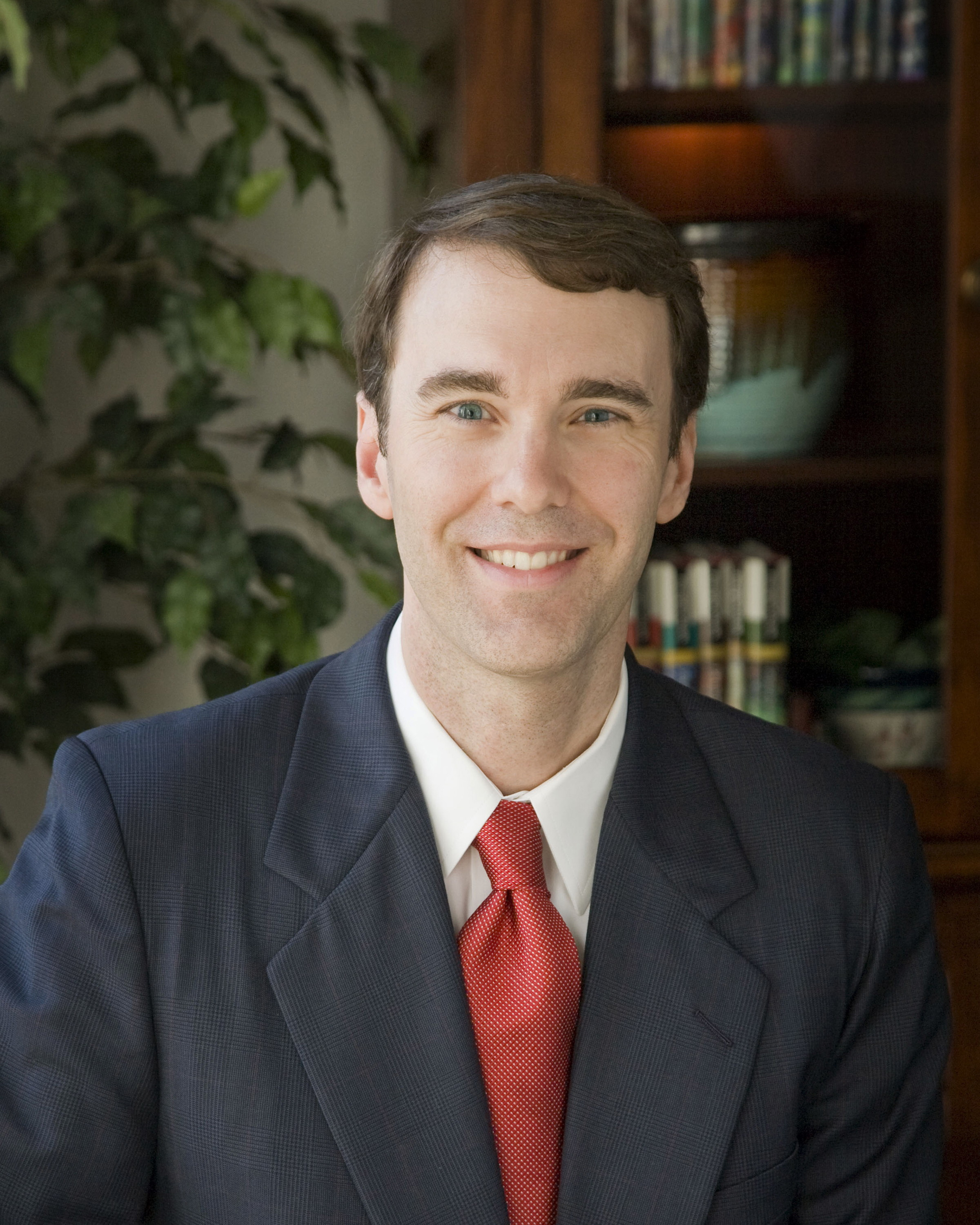
- Official portrait, 2011

President of Taylor University
- Incumbent
- Assumed office 2021
- Preceded by: Paige Comstock Cunningham

President of Gordon College
- In office 2011–2021
- Preceded by: R. Judson Carlberg
- Succeeded by: Michael D. Hammond

Personal details
- Born: 16 November 1971 (age 54) Jackson, Mississippi, U.S.
- Education: Baylor University (BA); Princeton Theological Seminary (MDiv); Wycliffe Hall, Oxford (PgD); Princeton University (PhD)
- Profession: Sociologist, university president

David Michael Lindsay (born November 16, 1971) is an American sociologist and the president of Taylor University. He was also president of Gordon College, a private, evangelical Christian liberal arts college on Boston's North Shore from 2011 to 2021. Before arriving at Gordon, Lindsay was on faculty for five years at Rice University and the James A. Baker III Institute for Public Policy. He studies leadership, elites, evangelicalism, and higher education.

== Early life and family ==
David Michael Lindsay was born in Jackson, Mississippi, on November 16, 1971, as an only child. He graduated from Jackson Preparatory School in 1990 as a National Merit Scholar, where his mother, Susan Lindsay, is now the head of school. Along with his mother, Lindsay converted from Catholicism to Southern Baptist Evangelicalism as a child. His father, Ken Lindsay, was the president of the PGA from 1997 to 1998 and was one of the officials in golf before his retirement in 2008.

== Education and career ==
Lindsay graduated from Baylor University, summa cum laude and Phi Beta Kappa, with a B.A. in English and Speech in 1994. In 2000, Lindsay graduated from Princeton Theological Seminary with a Master of Divinity. He then obtained a postgraduate diploma from Wycliffe Hall at Oxford University in 2001. Following a period in England, Lindsay enrolled in a doctoral program at Princeton University in sociology, completing his Ph.D. in 2006.

Professionally, Lindsay worked as a consultant for religion and culture for the George H. Gallup International Institute from 1998 to 2003, and following his graduation from Princeton, was hired at Rice University as an assistant professor of sociology in 2006. While at Rice, he became a Rice Scholar at the James A. Baker III Institute for Public Policy. He held additional appointments with Leadership Rice and the Center on Race, Religion, and Urban Life. In 2010, he founded and directed the Program for the Study of Leadership, which sought to create leadership salons - dialogues with senior leaders such as Robert L. Clarke, former U.S. Comptroller of the Currency. Additionally, several undergraduate fellows were selected to participate in this program. Dr. Lindsay also completed his PLATINUM Study of leadership at the end of July 2011. The PLATINUM Study is the world's largest interview-based study of leadership and his subjects included top institutional leaders from the business, government, and non-profit sector. Some participants include: Jeff Immelt, CEO of General Electric, Edward Whitacre, former CEO of AT&T and former Chairman of General Motors, Tom Daschle, former Senate majority leaders, and Derek Bok, former president of Harvard. Upon his departure from Rice University, the program evolved into the Gateway Study of Leadership program.

=== Presidency of Gordon College ===
On March 28, 2011, Michael Lindsay was announced as the eighth president of Gordon College and began his tenure on July 1 later that year. At age 39, when he assumed his position, Lindsay was the second youngest college president of any college or university nationally then ranked by U.S. News & World Report.

When he was announced as the president, Lindsay received support from individuals such as Mark Noll, Myron Ullman, and Neil Clark Warren. He stated his intention to use his inaugural year to raise awareness about Gordon College around the country. He was inaugurated on September 16, 2011, in a ceremony that featured Nathan Hatch, the president of Wake Forest University. As part of the inaugural ceremonies, a worship service was performed with John Ortberg as the speaker. In his inaugural address, titled "Faithful Leadership for the Common Good," Lindsay set out three principles which he titled "The Gordon Commission": to "stretch the minds" of students, to "deepen the faith", and to "elevate the contribution."

In 2014, Lindsay came under fire for signing a letter addressed to President Obama expressing his support for religious institutions to continue to seek federal funding while maintaining the right to discriminate against those who did not follow a religious institution’s policy on sexuality. As a result, Lynn, MA, public schools elected to end their partnership with the college. The City of Salem also terminated its contract with Gordon College for management of the Old Town Hall.

In 2017, Gordon college professor Margaret Deweese-Boyd sued President Lindsay and Gordon College for claims of workplace discrimination. Gordon sought to use the ministerial exception in the school’s defense, claiming Deweese-Boyd should be considered a minister in her social work professor role. Lindsay said that there were no “non-sacred roles” at the institution. Ultimately, the Massachusetts Supreme Court struck down this attempted use of the ministerial exception. Gordon College later settled with Deweese-Boyd.

On October 21, 2020, Lindsay announced that he would be stepping down as President of Gordon College.

=== Presidency of Taylor University ===
On March 16, 2021, Taylor University announced Lindsay as President-Elect of the university. Lindsay was inaugurated as the 18th president of the university on October 8, 2021.

During his introductory State of the university and a town hall with students and faculty, Lindsay laid out three priorities that he hoped to focus on: refinancing the university's long-term debt, raising the level of diversity across campus, and making Taylor University globally minded.

== Research ==
Lindsay's first research projects focused on evangelicals in leadership positions in America, which formed the basis for his dissertation, Faith in the Corridors of Power. The dissertation drew upon over 350 interviews with evangelical leaders in business, government, cultural institutions, and religion. In 2007, the dissertation was published by Oxford University Press as Faith in the Halls of Power: How Evangelicals Joined the American Elite. Faith in the Halls of Power met with mostly positive critical reviews. It was listed in Publishers Weekly's "Best Books of 2007." However, Alan Wolfe of The New York Times criticized the work by saying that "too much of the book is uncritical." The Economist, by contrast, called it "an impressive and admirably fair-minded book: anybody who wants to understand the nexus between God and power in modern America should start here." Christianity Today gave it first place among the Christianity and Culture category in their annual book awards.

Following the publication of the book, Lindsay began research on senior leaders in general, launching the largest interview-based study of senior American leaders ever done. The PLATINUM study, an acronym for Public Leaders in America Today and the Inquiry into their Networks, Upbringings, and Motivations, aims to look at leaders in corporate, government, and non-profit life. He completed the research in the summer of 2011, having interviewed a total of 550 American leaders. His work has given him interviews with people such as Jimmy Carter, Colin Powell, Vernon Jordan, Robert Diamond, and Condoleezza Rice. Overall, Lindsay is the author of 24 scholarly papers, book chapters, and other peer-reviewed articles. His work has also been profiled in media outlets ranging from CNN to The Wall Street Journal. He also has written pieced published by The Huffington Post and The Washington Post.

On May 5, 2014, Lindsay, along with co-author M.G. Hager, published View From the Top: An Inside Look at How People in Power See and Shape the World based on the work done in the PLATINUM study. In all, Lindsay interviewed 550 of America's top leaders, surpassing "The American Leadership Study", done by a group of researchers at Columbia University, which interviewed 545 people, as the largest-interview based study ever conducted.

== Personal life ==
Lindsay married his wife, Rebecca, in 1996, and is the father of three daughters.

== Selected works ==
- Gallup, George Jr., and D. Michael Lindsay. Surveying the Religious Landscape: Trends in U.S. Belief (Morehouse, 2000) ISBN 978-0-8192-1796-7
- Gallup, George Jr., and D. Michael Lindsay. The Gallup Guide: Reality Check for 21st Century Churches (Gallup, 2002) ISBN 978-0-7644-2397-0
- Lindsay, D. Michael. Faith in the Halls of Power (Oxford, 2007) ISBN 978-0-19-532666-6
- Lindsay, D. Michael, and M.G. Hager. View From the Top: An Inside Look at How People in Power See and Shape the World (Wiley, 2014) ISBN 978-1-1189-0110-6
