= Joel Sonnenberg =

American motivational speaker (born 1977)

- Born: November 1977 (age 47)
- Occupation: Motivational speaker

Joel Sonnenberg (born November 1977) is a Christian motivational speaker. He is a graduate of Taylor University as well as Columbia International University's seminary program.

On September 15, 1979, when Sonnenberg was 22 months old, he was involved in a devastating accident that left him with burns over 85% of his body. Sonnenberg was burned after a tractor trailer crashed into the car he was in, resulting in the rupturing of its fuel tank. Sonnenberg was rescued from the burning car by a stranger. The tissue damage suffered included the loss of the fingers on his right hand, his left hand entirely, his ears, and damage to his skull.

It took Sonnenberg many years to recover from the burn injuries. He endured 45 surgeries and the emotional pain of dealing with disfigurement, but through the support of faith, family, and friends, he went on to become a student leader, all-conference athlete and internationally sought speaker.

Sonnenberg completed studies toward a master of theology degree and has been on speaking tours throughout the United States and many other countries.

Sonnenberg has become an active international speaking minister, with particular interest in persons with disabilities.

== Books and film ==
- Joel, Joel Sonnenberg and Gregg Lewis, Zondervan, ISBN 0-310-24693-8
- Race for Life : The Joel Sonnenberg Story, Janet Sonnenberg, Zondervan ISBN 0-310-25930-4
- Scarred Hero: The Story of Joel Sonnenberg (film) ISBN 1-56364-601-3
- Sue Thomas: F.B.Eye (TV) 2004 Episode "Skin Deep"
- Public Eye with Bryant Gumbel (TV) 1998 Segment "Joel Sonnenberg"
