= Jay Kesler =

American academic (born 1935)

Jay Kesler (born September 15, 1935) is the former president, Chancellor and current President Emeritus of Taylor University in Upland, Indiana. Kesler graduated in 1958 from Taylor University and is notable for his writings and radio work. Most recently, he served as the Preaching Pastor of Upland Community Church, in Upland, Indiana. Dr. Kesler was President of Youth for Christ from 1973–1985 and President of Taylor University from 1985-2000. Dr. Kesler is also the author of nearly 30 books.

== Publications ==
- The Strong Weak People ISBN 0-88207-739-2
- Emotionally Healthy Teenagers ISBN 0-8499-4069-9
- Family Forum ISBN 0-88207-820-8
- Restoring A Loving Marriage ISBN 1-55513-666-4
- Grand parenting - The Agony and the Ecstasy ISBN 0-340-61249-5
- Challenges for the College Bound ISBN 0-8010-5262-9
- Being Holy, Being Human. ASIN: B000GSLRMQ
