= Julienne Johnson =

American artist

- Occupation: Artist
- Awards: Grammy Award nomination Dove Award nomination

Julienne Johnson is an American artist, poet, and singer-songwriter.

== Music career ==
Johnson was the front woman for the country rock band Sandusky, and was nominated for both a Grammy Award and Dove Award as a songwriter. Her band, Sandusky was named after her birthplace in Michigan of the same name. Johnson was also a songwriter for the track "Evermore" on the Take 6 album So Cool. Her poetry has also been published.

== Artistic career ==
She attended Taylor University in Indiana prior to her musical career, continuing with her study of art at Wayne State and Oakland Universities in Michigan. After relocating to California, began to study fine art in 2005 at the ArtCenter College of Design until 2009. She had painted on a part-time basis for ten years, focusing on still life, landscape and seascape paintings. Johnson became a fulltime artist in 2010 creating interdisciplinary artworks that include paintings, assemblage sculpture, installation, video and performance art.

A retrospective exhibition of her work entitled Passion and Structure: Julienne Johnson 2008 – 2014 was held in 2014 at the Metcalf Gallery of Taylor University. Other exhibitions of her work have taken place in California, Illinois, Michigan, Qatar, Armenia, Italy, China, Japan, and Thailand. Her works have appeared in three books: Ashes for Beauty in 2012, Touched in 2013, and Passion and Structure: 2008-2014.

Johnson’s work is included in the permanent collection of the Arab American National Museum, the Ratachadamnoen Museum and the Thaksin University Museum in Thailand. She was honored with a solo museum exhibition at the Southern Nevada Museum of Fine Art in Las Vegas, and has exhibited at the Fukuo Museum in Japan, Richard Nixon Presidential Library and Museum in California, Kitakyushu Municipal Museum of Art in Japan, Blue Roof Art Museum in China, Prince of Songkla University Museum in Thailand, and the Pacific Asia Museum in California.
