= Bruce Herman =

- Born: 1953 (age 72–73); Montclair, New Jersey, USA
- Education: B.F.A. and M.F.A. Boston University: School for the Arts under Philip Guston, James Weeks, David Aronson, Reed Kay, and Arthur Polonsky.
- Movement: Figurative Painting
- Spouse: Meg Matthews
- Website: www.bruceherman.com

Bruce Herman (born 1953) is an artist, author, and educator who formerly held the Lothlórien Distinguished Chair of Fine Arts in the art department of Gordon College. He earned both a Bachelor of Fine Arts, and a Master of Fine Arts from the College of Fine Arts at Boston University, where he studied under Philip Guston, James Weeks, David Aronson, Reed Kay, and Arthur Polonsky. He joined the faculty at Gordon College in 1984, and founded the art department and gallery there. His work has been exhibited nationally and internationally. He has received numerous awards, including Distinguished Alumnus of the Year, Boston University College of Fine Arts 2006; Artist in Residence, Duke University School of Divinity, 2016; and Lifetime Achievement Award, Gordon College, 2022. Herman's art is housed in the Vatican Museum of Modern Religious Art, the Cincinnati Museum of Fine Arts, The Grunewald Print Collection of the Armand Hammer Museum, LA, and the DeCordova Museum. Between 1983 and 2026 his work has been exhibited in more than 150 exhibitions, including a world tour of his "QU4RTETS" project with artist Makoto Fujimura, composer Christopher Theofanidis, and theologian Jeremy Begbiea—a collaborative enterprise in response to T. S. Eliot's magnum opus, "Four Quartets".
