= Christian College Consortium =

The Christian College Consortium is an affiliation of 13 Christian colleges and universities in the United States. Member schools provide each other with mutual support through scholarships, conferences, and exchange programs.

== History ==
The Consortium was founded in 1971 with an original membership of ten evangelical colleges. In 1976, it established a sister organization, the Christian College Coalition (now called the Council for Christian Colleges and Universities) for the purpose of representing the interests of Christian colleges to policymakers in Washington, D.C. The two organizations shared facilities in Washington until 1982, when the Consortium relocated its headquarters to St. Paul, Minnesota. The offices of the Consortium have subsequently moved to Wenham, Massachusetts.

== Member schools ==
The Consortium includes 13 member institutions:

- Asbury University
- Bethel University
- George Fox University
- Gordon College
- Greenville College
- Houghton College
- Malone University
- Messiah University
- Seattle Pacific University
- Taylor University
- Trinity International University
- Westmont College
- Wheaton College

== Consortium activities ==
The consortium facilitates access by consortium students to academic programs and offerings of the other consortium schools through its student visitor program, which allows study for at least one semester at any of the other consortium schools, including many of their external programs, with no separate application process.
