= Gordon College (Massachusetts) =

Christian college in Wenham, Massachusetts, US

- Former name: List: Boston Missionary Training Institute (1889–1891); Boston Missionary Training School (1891–1895); Gordon Missionary Training School (1895–1916); Gordon Bible College (1916–1921); Gordon College of Theology and Missions (1921–1962); Gordon College and Divinity School (1962–1970)
- Motto: Ίησοῦς Χριστός, Θεοῦ Υἱός, Σωτήρ" (Greek)
- Motto in English: Jesus Christ, Son of God, Savior
- Type: Private college
- Established: 1889; 137 years ago
- Accreditation: NECHE
- Religious affiliation: Non-denominational Christian
- Academic affiliations: Annapolis Group; CCCU; CCC
- Endowment: $105.6 million (2020)
- President: Michael D. Hammond
- Students: 1,595 (fall 2024)
- Undergraduates: 1,314 (fall 2024)
- Postgraduates: 281 (fall 2024)
- Location: Wenham, Massachusetts, U.S. 42.5898°N 70.8229°W
- Campus: 485 acres (196 ha); Suburban
- Colors: Navy blue & white
- Nickname: Fighting Scots
- Sporting affiliations: NCAA Division III – CCC, ECAC
- Mascot: Scottish Lion Rampant
- Website: gordon.edu
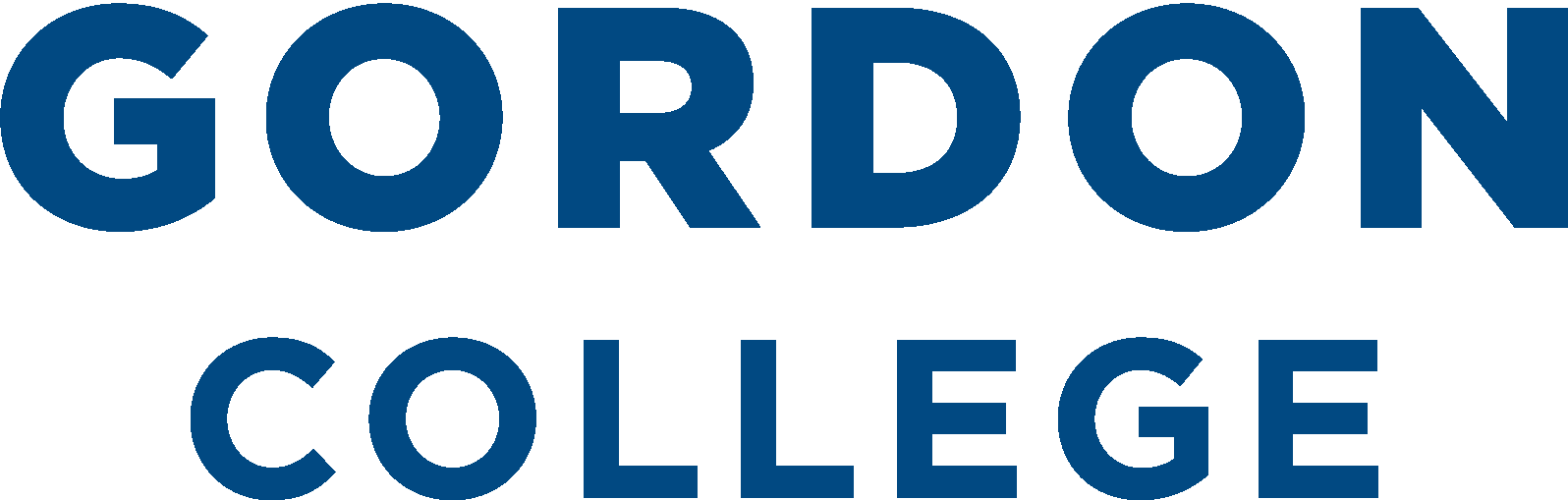

Gordon College is a private Christian college in Wenham, Massachusetts, United States. The college offers 44 majors, 55 concentrations, and 30 interdisciplinary and pre-professional minors as well as graduate programs in education, music education, public health and leadership. Gordon has an undergraduate enrollment of 1,610 (2024) students representing more than 50 Christian denominations.

== History ==
In 1889 Adoniram Judson Gordon founded the school, Boston Missionary Training Institute, in the Fenway–Kenmore neighborhood of Boston at the Clarendon Street Baptist Church to train Christian missionaries for work in what was then the Congo Free State. Progressive at its inception in 1889, the school admitted both men and women of various ethnicities. It was renamed Gordon Bible College in 1916 and expanded to Newton Theological Institution facilities along the Fenway, into a facility donated by Martha Frost in 1919. Frost, a widowed Bostonian with several properties in the city, provided a significant philanthropic gift. In 1921, the school was renamed Gordon College of Theology and Missions.

In the early 1950s, a Gordon student named James Higginbotham approached Frederick H. Prince about selling his 1,000-acre (4.0 km^{2}) estate to the college after learning of recent property viewings by the United Nations and Harvard University. In 1955, Gordon developed into a liberal arts college with a graduate theological seminary and moved to its present several-hundred-acre Wenham campus north of Boston. Gordon sold its Boston campus on Evans Way to Wentworth Institute of Technology. The Prince Memorial Chapel on the Wenham campus (since replaced) was named for Frederick Prince, and the Prince residence was named Frost Hall after Martha Frost.

In 1958, Gordon College instituted a core curriculum. In the 1950s it launched its first study-abroad program, European Seminar.

In 1962, the school changed its name to Gordon College and Divinity School. In 1970, the Gordon Divinity School separated from the college to merge with the Conwell School of Theology, once part of Temple University, to form the Gordon–Conwell Theological Seminary in Hamilton, Massachusetts.

Barrington College, founded in 1900 as the Bethel Bible Institute in Spencer, Massachusetts, later relocated to Dudley, Massachusetts, and then to Providence, Rhode Island. It took the name Barrington after the campus was moved to Barrington, Rhode Island, in 1959. Barrington merged with Gordon College in 1985, forming a United College of Gordon and Barrington.

=== 2014 discrimination controversy ===
On July 1, 2014, Gordon College President D. Michael Lindsay was one of fourteen leaders of religious and civic organizations who signed a letter to U.S. President Barack Obama about an executive order he was contemplating that would prohibit federal contractors from discriminating on the basis of sexual orientation and gender identity. The letter asked the president to include language that would exempt religious organizations from the executive order's requirements, suggesting he "find a way to respect diversity of opinion . . . in a way that respects the dignity of all parties". They suggested the exemption be based on language the U.S. Senate had recently added as an amendment to the Employment Non-Discrimination Act (ENDA). Obama did not use the ENDA amendment's language when he issued his order on July 21 but left in place a narrower exemption established with respect to federal contractors in 2002 by President George W. Bush's Executive Order 13279.

In response, on July 9, Salem, Massachusetts, Mayor Kimberley Driscoll ended Gordon College's contract to manage and maintain the city's Old Town Hall, citing a city ordinance that prohibits Salem from contracting with entities that discriminate on the basis of sexual orientation. Gordon's contract with the city would otherwise have expired on September 1. For similar reasons, in August, the Lynn Public Schools ended its relationship with the college, which had provided students to work without pay in the schools as part their training toward degrees in education and social work.

In late July, the Peabody Essex Museum ended its academic relationship with the Gordon museum studies program, later withdrawing its support for Gordon's grant application to the National Endowment for the Humanities that aimed at funding an expansion of its museum studies program. In mid-September the New England Association of Schools and Colleges gave the college a year to report on how its non-discrimination policies met the organization's standards for accreditation. At its April 2015 meeting, the New England Association of Schools and Colleges affirmed that Gordon's accreditation remained in good standing, with no further action required by the Commission at that time.

Conservative legal organizations have offered to represent the college in lawsuits that would argue that severing ties to the school constituted retaliation for the exercise of free speech and the practice of religion. Lindsay declined those offers and later said he would not have signed the letter had he anticipated the reaction and the impact on Gordon. The school subsequently reviewed its code of conduct, which, in addition to banning sex outside of marriage, bans homosexual practice. Based on that review, Lindsay announced that "its policy barring student or faculty sex out of heterosexual marriage will remain as is." In addition, Gordon College rolled out several initiatives aimed at preventing bullying of gay, lesbian, transsexual, and bisexual students.

=== Lawsuits ===
In 2015, Lauren Barthold, associate professor in the department of philosophy, filed a lawsuit against the college for retaliating against her because she publicly disagreed with the college's President D. Michael Lindsay who sought to allow federal contractors, on the basis of religion, to discriminate against LBGTQ individuals in hiring. The lawsuit contends that the college violated state laws protecting against retaliation. As part of a joint resolution, Prof. Barthold resigned in 2016.

In 2017, the college was sued by Margaret DeWeese-Boyd, associate professor in the department of sociology and social work. DeWeese-Boyd filed a complaint in Essex Superior Court claiming that the college's President Lindsay and Provost Janel Curry discriminated against her because of her gender and denied her promotion to full professorship for advocating against the school's LGBTQ policies. The college filed a motion seeking a summary judgment to determine whether the ministerial exception clause barred DeWeese-Boyd from suing. In November 2019, both parties appeared before the court for a hearing and DeWeese-Boyd argued that she never worked as a minister with the college. On April 2, 2020, Judge Jeffrey T. Karp of the Massachusetts Superior Court ruled against the ministerial exception defense. This decision was appealed to the Massachusetts Supreme Judicial Court (SJC) based on the July 2020 Supreme Court decision handed down in Our Lady of Guadalupe School v. Morrissey-Berru. The SJC upheld the Superior Court decision in an opinion authored by Justice Scott L. Kafker. The United States Supreme Court declined a request to review the SJC's decision.

=== 2020 tuition decrease ===
In the October 2020, Gordon College announced a 33% reduction in tuition from $56.7k sticker price to $37.9k, joining two other CCCU schools in bringing tuition costs more in line with what a typical family would consider 'affordable.' The college notes that this reduction is made possible due to its Faith Rising capital campaign, which has expanded its base endowment by $125 million in the past year (250%), coupled with 24% debt reduction. Scholarships will be adjusted accordingly, with current students allowed to choose which arrangement they prefer. The reduction took effect in the fall semester of 2021.

Previously, in the fall of 2019, Gordon received the largest donation in its history, an anonymous gift of $75.5 million, with additional commitments of an additional $50 million, substantially increasing an endowment of $50 million and resulting in a 15% increase in college-funded student financial aid.

=== Presidents ===
Presidents of the college have included:

- A. J. Gordon (Adoniram Judson) (1889–1895)
- Nathan R. Wood (1919–1944)
- T. Leonard Lewis (1944–1959)
- James Forrester (1960–1968)
- Harold John Ockenga (1969–1976)
- Richard Gross (1976–1992)
- R. Judson Carlberg (1992–2011)
- D. Michael Lindsay (2011–2021)
- Mike Hammond (2021-present)

== Academic associations ==
Gordon College is accredited by the New England Commission of Higher Education. The music program is accredited by the National Association of Schools of Music (NASM) and the social work program is accredited by the Council on Social Work Education (CSWE). The Department of Education of the Commonwealth of Massachusetts recognizes Gordon College's teacher-education program under the Interstate Service Compact. Gordon is a member of the Annapolis Group and of the Christian College Consortium. It is also a member of the Council for Christian Colleges and Universities (CCCU).

== Academics ==
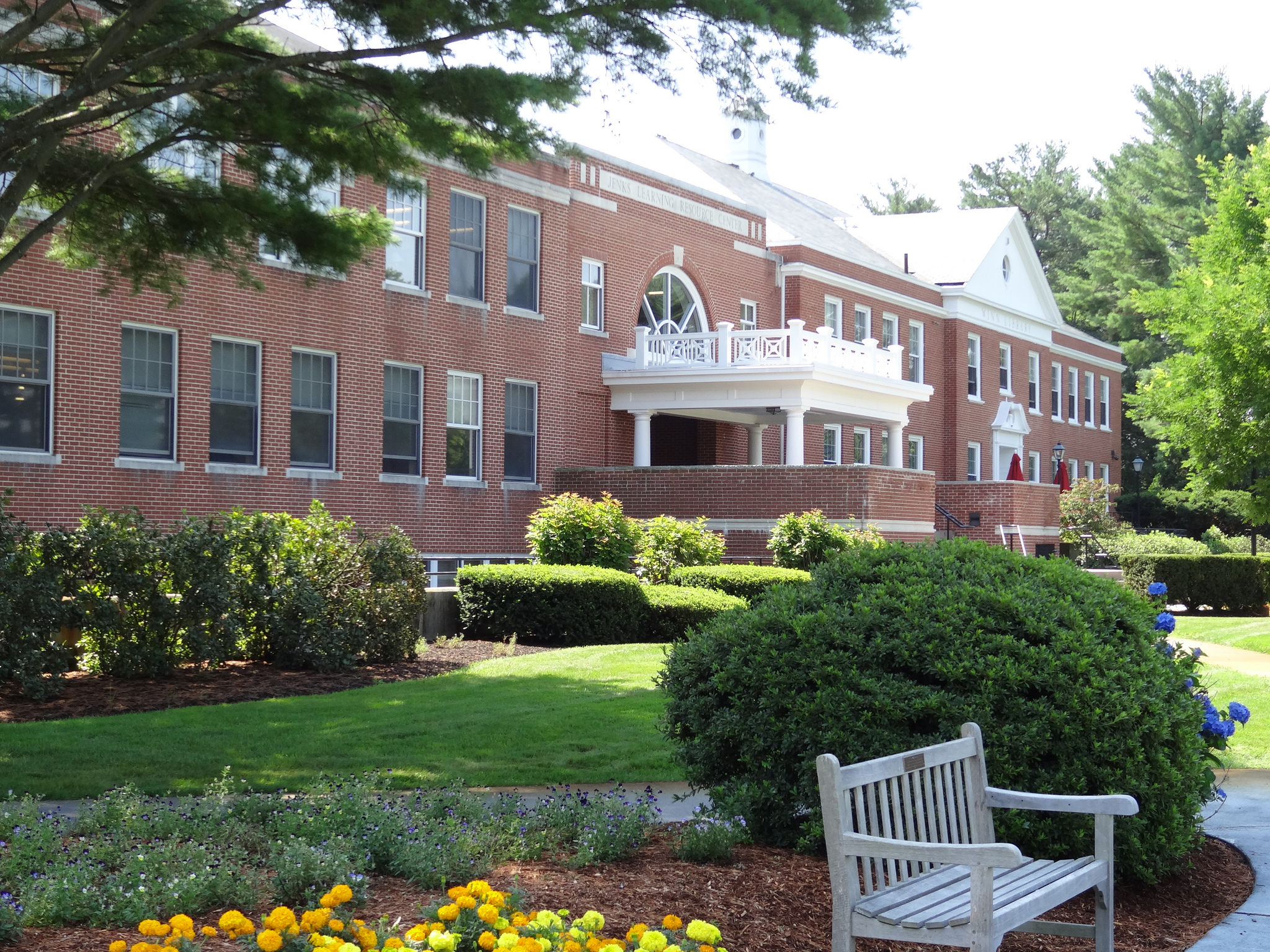
Jenks Library

Gordon College offers BA, BM, BS, MEd, MMEd, MA, and MS degrees. It offers undergraduate degrees from 27 majors, 42 concentrations and 11 interdisciplinary and preprofessional minors. Gordon offers both a graduate degree in education and music. The Graduate Education program offers the MEd degree. The Graduate Music program offers an MMEd degree, licensure-only options, and workshops.

== Student life ==
As of 2013 a total of 2,109 students were enrolled at Gordon College, 1,707 of them undergraduates.

A Christian multidenominational college, Gordon requires students to sign the school's Statement of Faith, though the religious conclusions and commitments among students and faculty remain diverse. Catholics do not teach at Gordon College although some students are Catholic. All students must also sign a Life and Conduct Statement agreeing to the standards of behavior that Gordon values. Gordon College prohibits sexual relations outside marriage, homosexual practice, alcohol, tobacco, and narcotic or hallucinogenic drugs on campus and continues to uphold a dorm-visitation policy that allows for male-female visitation only during particular hours. Chapel services take place on Mondays and Wednesdays, and an academic convocation takes place on Fridays; attendance of chapel, convocation or other events (lectures, debates, presentations, films, exhibitions, etc.) is required to graduate. All full-time students must obtain 30 "Christian Life and Worship Credits" per semester.

=== Student body and demographics ===
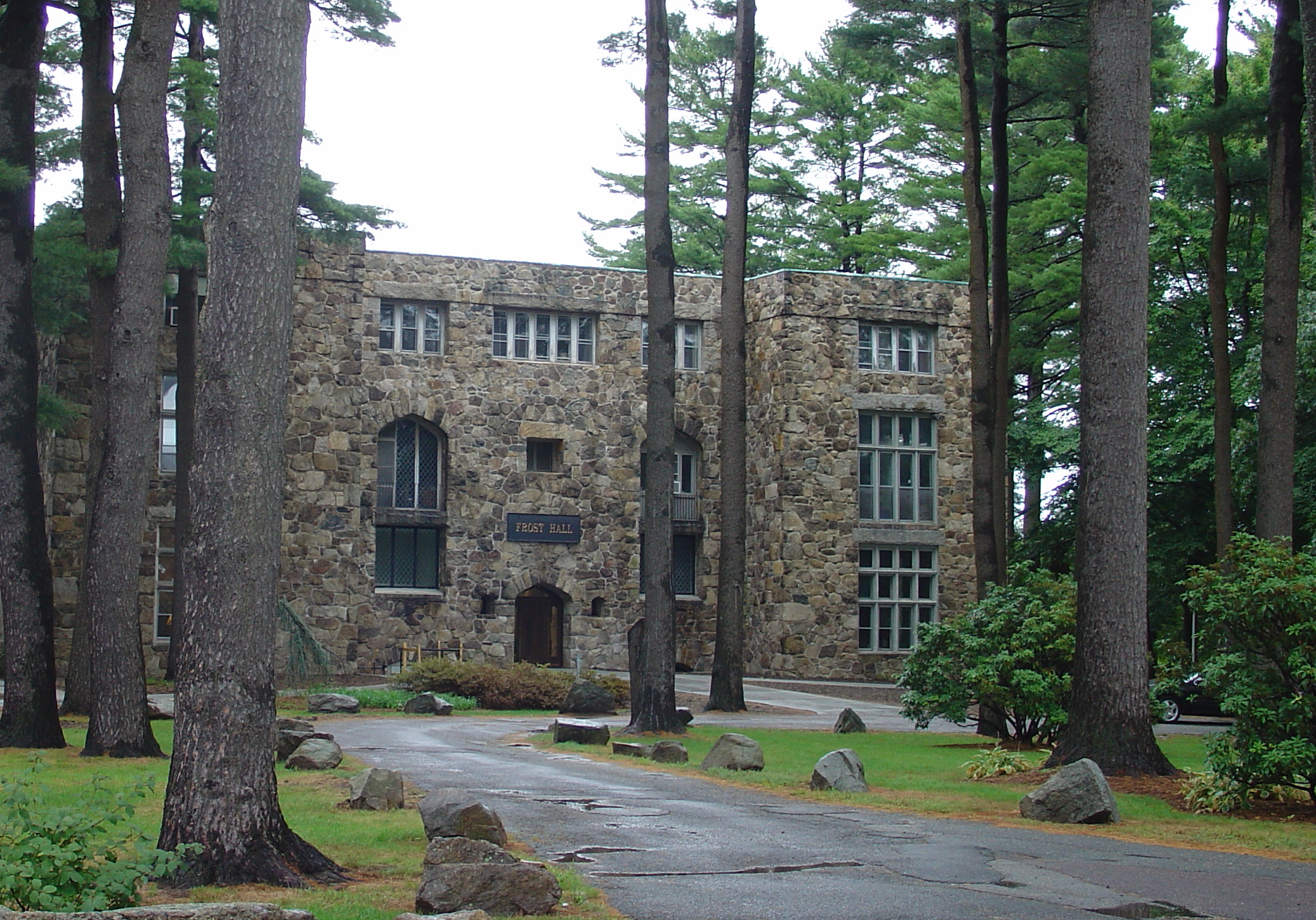
Frost Hall

In the fall of 2013 the college drew its undergraduate enrollment of 1,707 from 43 states and 41 foreign countries. Approximately 22 percent of enrollment—including international students—were of Asian, African American, mestizo, Native American, or other non-Caucasian descent.

=== Extracurriculars ===
Gordon College has a student association, student ministries, intramural sports, and a Campus Events Council. There are student-led community-service and outreach organizations ranging from drama troupes to Big Brothers Big Sisters and Habitat for Humanity.

Many other Gordon College outreach programs are based at other sites, such as Lynn, Massachusetts, where the school has partners for community development. Several student-led groups organize spring-break, winter-break and summer-break community-service trips and mission trips to different sites around the country and the globe.

== Athletics ==
Gordon Fighting Scots wordmark

Gordon College's varsity sports compete in the NCAA Division III, primarily in the Conference of New England. Gordon College's 30 teams compete in baseball, basketball, cross-country, field hockey, lacrosse, rowing, soccer, softball, swimming, tennis, track & field (indoor and outdoor) and volleyball. Athletes are called "The Fighting Scots".

Men's basketball head coach Tod Murphy, who became head coach in 2009, had led the Fighting Scots to five Commonwealth Coast Conference tournament appearances as of 2015. One of these five years he led the team to an NCAA tournament appearance. Eric Demers, a 2020 graduate, led the nation in points per game averaging 33.3 points, including a 42-point performance against University of Hartford (Division 1).

== Campus ==
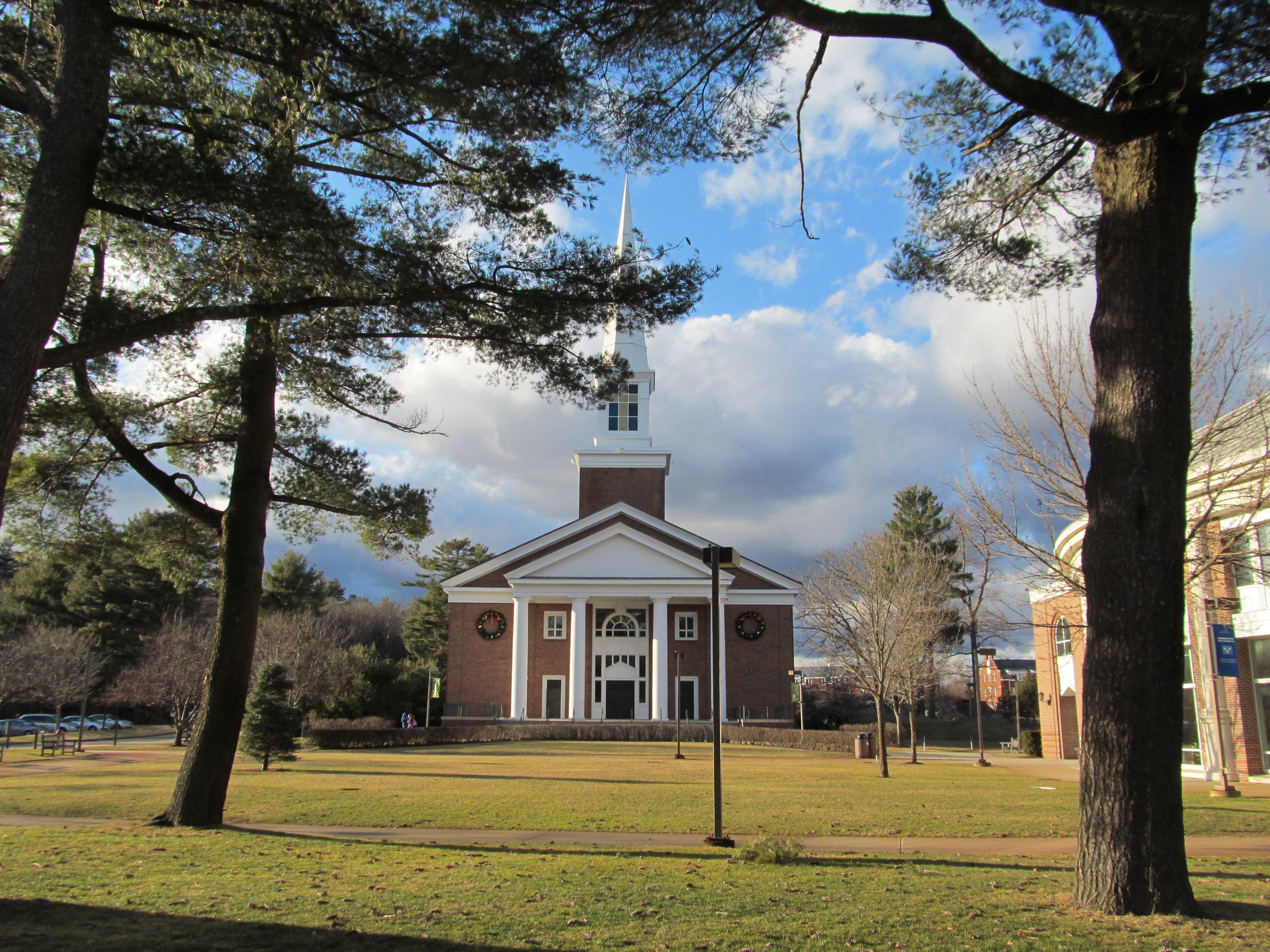
A. J. Gordon Memorial Chapel

In 2007, Gordon College dedicated its 450-acre (180 ha) campus property in the name of benefactors Dale E. and Sarah Ann Fowler following an unrestricted endowment promise of $60 million from their estate, which the college would receive at an undetermined future date. As of 2007, the Fowler gift (once received) was projected to triple the current endowment for Gordon College. In 2014 the Gordon endowment was $44,008,437. The Dale E. and Sarah Ann Fowler Campus at Gordon College is 25 miles north of Boston. The campus is situated on 450 acres (180 ha) of wooded property.

The Gordon College Bennett Center is a 78,000 square feet (7,200 m^{2}) athletics and recreational sports facility. The Bennett Center is a gift to the Gordon community from the George and Helen Bennett family. The $8 million center was completed in October 1996 and in 1997 won the Athletics Business Magazine Top Ten New Facilities Award for its design and usability.

The Ken Olsen Science Center, named for the founder of Digital Equipment Corporation and long-time Gordon College Board member, Ken Olsen, is an 80,000 square feet (7,400 m^{2}) science and technology center.

=== Gordon Global Programs ===
Gordon's Global Education Office has programs in Orvieto, Italy, Hong Kong, Oxford, Belize, Croatia, the Balkans, New Zealand, Latin America, and Uganda. Students enrolled in Gordon's Global program may use financial aid towards a study abroad semester.

== Notable alumni ==
- John-Manuel Andriote, journalist
- Edwin David Aponte, cultural historian, author, and Presbyterian minister
- Roy A. Clouser, professor of philosophy and religion
- Jonathan Draper, Anglican priest and theologian
- Rob Graves, songwriter and producer
- Pete Holmes, comedian
- James Davison Hunter, sociologist
- Meredith G. Kline, theologian and Old Testament scholar
- George Eldon Ladd, Baptist minister and professor of New Testament exegesis and theology
- Thomas Lake, reporter
- Ted Malloch, author, consultant, and television producer
- John Muether, author and librarian
- Kenneth Lee Pike, linguist and anthropologist
- Gary D. Schmidt, author
- Hillary Scholten, politician
- Jen Simmons, web developer, graphic designer and educator
- Christian Smith, sociologist
- Katrina Smith, politician
- Merrill C. Tenney, professor of New Testament at Wheaton College
- Doug Worgul, novelist

== Notable faculty ==
- Mia Chung - Artist-in-Residence and Professor of Music
- Bruce Herman – Professor of art, visual artist and author
- Marvin R. Wilson – Emeritus, Harold John Ockenga Professor of Biblical & Theological Studies
