= Buckeye gasoline buggy =

America's first practical gasoline automobile

Buckeye Gasoline Buggy
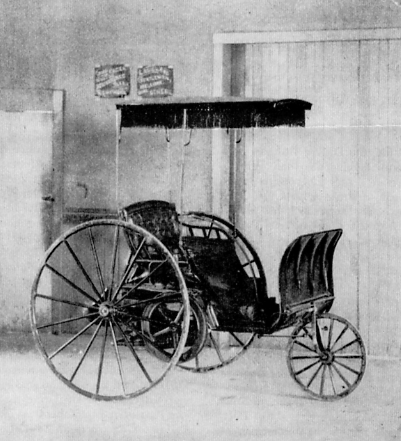
- The 1891 Buckeye Gasoline Buggy

Overview
- Also called: Lambert Gasoline Buggy
- Production: 1890
- Model years: 1891
- Assembly: Ohio City, Ohio
- Designer: John William Lambert, inventor

Body and chassis
- Body style: Phaeton
- Layout: Rear Engine, RWD

Powertrain
- Engine: 104 cubic inches (1,700 cc; 1.70 L) Single
- Power output: 15 brake horsepower (15 PS; 11 kW); 18 pound force-feet (24 N⋅m)
- Transmission: Single-Speed

Dimensions
- Curb weight: 1,275 pounds (578 kg)

Chronology
- Successor: Union

The Buckeye Gasoline Buggy, also known as the Lambert gasoline buggy, was an 1891 gasoline automobile, the first made in the United States. It was also the first automobile made available for sale in the United States. It was initially a three-wheel horseless carriage, propelled by an internal combustion gasoline engine; it was later developed into a four-wheel automobile with a gearless transmission, and was mass-produced during the first part of the twentieth century. The platform was later expanded into a line of trucks and fire engines.

== Creation ==
John William Lambert built the United States' first gasoline internal combustion engine automobile, according to a five-year study by L. Scott Bailey (an automobile historian, editor, and publisher) which found substantial evidence to enter the claim on Lambert's behalf. In 1891, Lambert successfully designed and built the automobile, and drove it on the streets of Ohio City, Ohio. Henry Ford and Duryea Brothers would not construct automobiles of their own until several years later.

In Europe, Carl Benz and Gottlieb Daimler produced the first gasoline automobiles in 1885–1886. The Duryea brothers made their first American automobile in 1893, and three years later started mass-producing cars at Duryea Motor Wagon Company; Henry Ford started mass-producing cars in 1899 at the Detroit Automobile Company.

== Initial model ==
Lambert initially worked on an internal combustion three-cylinder gasoline engine in 1890. He successfully tested it in January 1891, inside an 80-foot (24 m) farm equipment showroom he owned and managed in Ohio City, Ohio. He did his first outside driving in late February of that year, on the main street of the city. It had a four-stroke engine. It had a forward center small wheel for steering, which was operated by foot with a stirrup-type device.

== Subsequent development ==
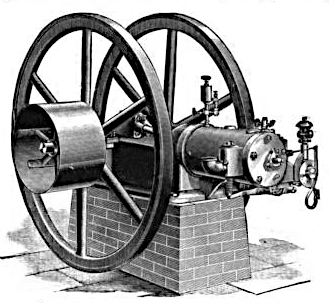
Lambert Gas and Gasoline Company stationary engine of 1895 for farm and industrial factory use.

In 1892, Lambert decided to begin manufacturing stationary gasoline engines for farm and industrial use. In that year he moved to Anderson, Indiana, and incorporated the Lambert Gas and Gasoline Engine Company. He formed the Buckeye Manufacturing Company in 1893 to make automobiles. He experimented further with drive-train technology, and devised the Lambert friction gearing disk drive transmission, which became a key feature on all of his future automobiles. The three-wheel gasoline buggy design from 1891 was eventually modified and developed into the four wheel Union automobile, which was first sold in 1902. It was tiller-steered and about 300 cars were made which came with the friction disk drive transmission.

A second factory was constructed in 1905, for the manufacture of the Union car. At that time, the company changed its name to the Lambert Automobile Company, and the buggy was redesigned into a higher-quality vehicle suitable for mass production. In addition to gasoline-powered street cars, the company made commercial trucks, fire-engine vehicles, railroad inspection vehicles, and tractors for farmers.

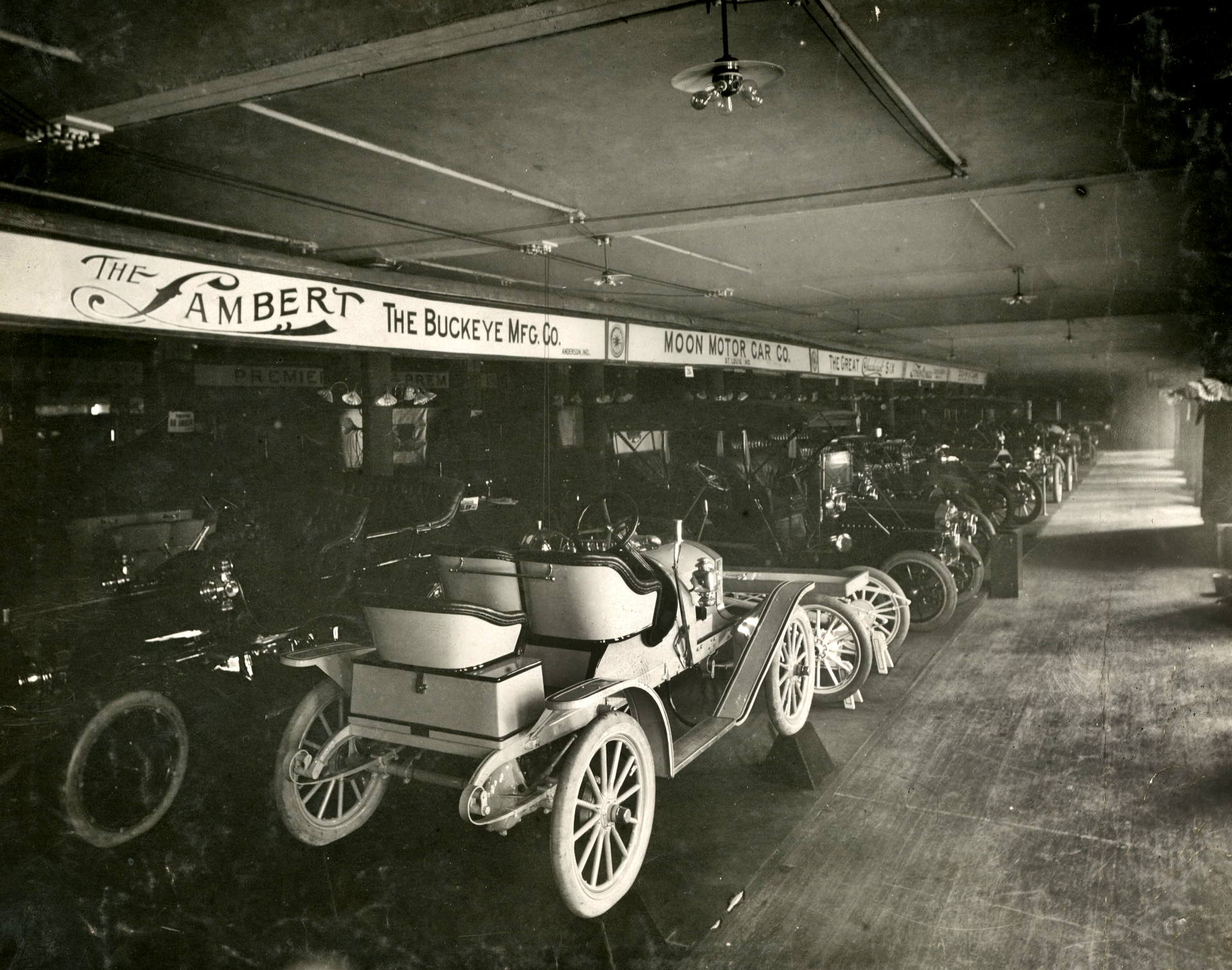
Buckeye Manufacturing Company manufacturing the Lambert automobiles in mass-production assembly line.

The Lambert Automobile Company belonged under the umbrella of the Buckeye Manufacturing Company conglomerate group. It produced an average of 2,000 vehicles per year between 1906 and 1910, with 500 employees (and hiring more workers each year). The company employed over a thousand workers by 1910, and production increased to an average of around 3,000 vehicles per year until 1916. In that year, only about a thousand vehicles were manufactured. In 1917, when the United States entered into World War I, the plant retooled to make equipment for the war. They then made projectiles, ammunition, wheels, and special-purpose engines.

Lambert produced only a few vehicles after the war was over. He realized that, for automobile manufacturing to be profitable, cars had to be mass-produced in high numbers to enable economies of scale. By 1922, the Buckeye Manufacturing Company had stopped manufacturing vehicles and automobile parts altogether. In the time of their production, however, automobiles had been the company's main enterprise. The company designed its own bodyworks and vehicle motors; sometimes these parts were made to order by third parties and manufactured to Buckeye's specifications. The automobile interiors were of high-quality upholstery, and the exterior paint was applied in fifteen layers.

== See also ==
- Lambert automobile
- Union Automobile Company

== Sources ==
- Bailey, L. Scott (1960). Historic Discovery: 1891 Lambert, New Claim for America's First Car (PDF). Vol. 24. Heuss Printing.
- Batchelor, Ray (1994). Henry Ford, mass production, modernizing, and design. Manchester, Maryland: Manchester University Press. ISBN 9780719041747.
- Benton, William, ed. (1983). "John William Lambert". The New Encyclopedia Britannica. Vol. 2. New York City: Encyclopedia Britannica.
- Clymer, Floyd (1950). Treasury of early American automobiles, 1877-1925. New York City: McGraw-Hill. OCLC 1004934361.
- Forkner, John La Rue (1914). History of Madison County, Indiana. Chicago, Illinois: Lewis Publishing Company.
- Lucendo, Jorge (2019). Cars of Legend. McFarland & Company.
- Madden, W. C. (2003). Haynes-Apperson and America's First Practical Automobile. Jefferson, North Carolina: McFarland & Company. ISBN 0-7864-1397-2.
- Scharchburg, Richard P. (1993). Carriages Without Horses. Chicago, Illinois: Society of Automotive Engineers. ISBN 9781560913801.
- Wise, David Burgess (2000). The New Illustrated Encyclopedia of Automobiles. Edison, New Jersey: Quantum Publishing. ISBN 0-7858-1106-0.
