= Lambert House =

Lambert House may refer to:

- Lambert House (Monticello, Arkansas), listed on the National Register of Historic Places (NRHP) in Drew County
- David Lambert House, Wilton, Connecticut, listed on the NRHP in Fairfield County, Connecticut
- Furr-Lambert House, Clarkesville, Georgia, listed on the NRHP in Habersham County, Georgia
- Lambert House (Convent, Louisiana), listed on the NRHP in St. James Parish, Louisiana
- Thomas Lambert House, Rowley, Massachusetts, listed on the NRHP in Massachusetts
- Lambert-Parent House, Union City, Ohio, listed on the NRHP in Ohio
- Lambert House (Seattle, Washington) Non-profit LGBTQ+ Youth Community Center in Seattle since 1981
