= Hotchkiss House =

Hotchkiss House may refer to:

- Hotchkiss House (Monticello, Arkansas), listed on the NRHP in Arkansas
- David Hotchkiss House, Prospect, Connecticut, listed on the NRHP in New Haven County, Connecticut
- Fyler-Hotchkiss Estate, Torrington, Connecticut, listed on the NRHP in Connecticut
- Jedediah Hotchkiss House, Windsor, New York, listed on the NRHP in New York
