= WBOI =

Public radio station in Fort Wayne, Indiana

Coordinates: 41.104°N 85.179°W

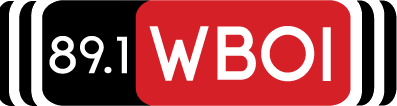
- Fort Wayne, Indiana; United States
- Broadcast area: Fort Wayne, Indiana
- Frequency: 89.1 MHz (HD Radio)
- Branding: 89.1 WBOI

Programming
- Format: Public radio
- Subchannels: HD2: Radio reading service

Ownership
- Owner: Northeast Indiana Public Radio

History
- First air date: June 5, 1978 (as WIPU)
- Former call signs: WIPU (1978–82); WBNI (1982–90); WBNI-FM (1990–2004)

Technical information
- Licensing authority: FCC
- Facility ID: 53745
- Class: B
- ERP: 50,000 watts
- HAAT: 184 meters (604 ft)

Links
- Public license information: Public file; LMS
- Webcast: Listen live
- Website: wboi.org

WBOI is an FM radio station located in Fort Wayne, Indiana. The station operates on the FM radio frequency of 89.1 MHz. It is a National Public Radio member station, owned and operated by Northeast Indiana Public Radio, a non-profit organization. The station has studios and a 604-foot transmitter tower on Clairmont Court in Fort Wayne's Centennial Park. Effective radiated power is 50,000 watts, covering northeast Indiana, northwest Ohio and extreme southern Michigan.

== History ==
=== Establishment ===
WBOI began broadcasting on June 5, 1978, as WIPU on the campus of Indiana Purdue Fort Wayne (IPFW) with a very limited schedule using university staff and students. The station acquired enough of a following that by 1981, The Friends of WIPU was incorporated as a support organization.

In 1981, Purdue University, which held the license, announced that if new funding sources could not be found, it would have to close the station. The Friends of WIPU incorporated as Public Broadcasting of Northeast Indiana (now known as Northeast Indiana Public Radio), and bought the station in an effort to save public radio in the area. PBNI officially took control on March 16, 1982; changing the call letters to WBNI.

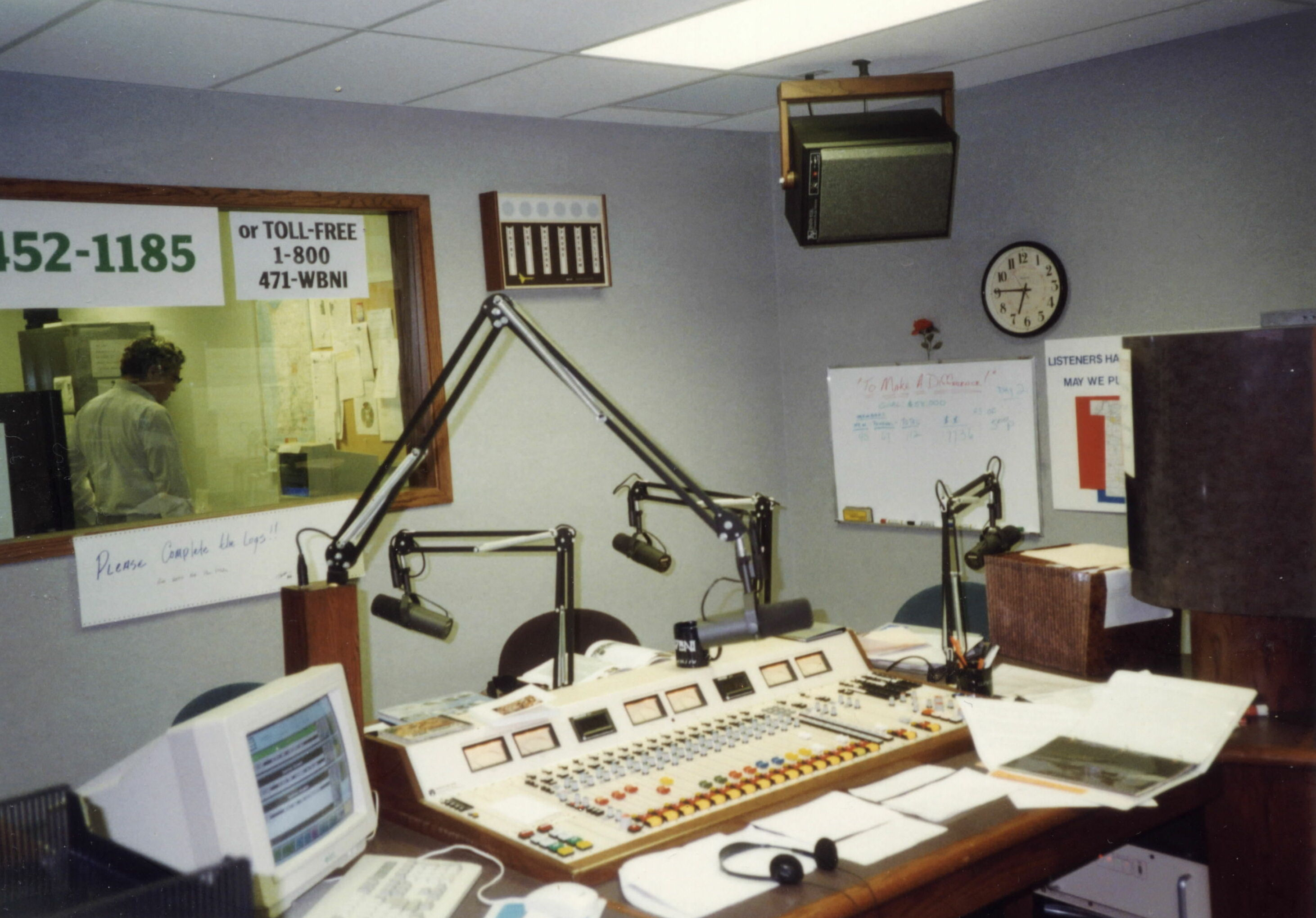
WBNI's original broadcast studio during a pledge drive. This studio is now used by WBOI.

The day the call sign and ownership change took place, the WBNI studios at IPFW flooded. Within ten days, the station relocated to the historic YWCA facility on North Wells Street. The schedule was gradually expanded and effective radiated power was also increased. Programming was mostly classical music, jazz, and folk music; in 1985, the station joined the Corporation for Public Broadcasting and added A Prairie Home Companion and All Things Considered, with Morning Edition following in 1988. The station began airing occasional tapes of local concerts, including the Fort Wayne Philharmonic Orchestra.

In 1993, Northeast Indiana Public Radio's 600-foot (180 m) transmitter tower was erected in Centennial Park and effective radiated power was raised from 31,000 watts to 34,000 watts, greatly expanding the coverage area in northeast Indiana, southern Michigan, and northwest Ohio. A new broadcasting facility was dedicated in the spring of 1994. Programming remained much the same until early 2002, when a sister station, WBOI, began broadcasting from the same building using WBNI's old tower in Orland; a 10-watt translator was set up in Fort Wayne to repeat WBOI's programming at 88.7 FM.

=== Growth to two services ===
With WBOI's sign-on, it took all NPR news, jazz and folk music programming from WBNI, which became a 24-hour classical music station. In 2004, the two stations swapped frequencies, with WBOI moving to the stronger 89.1 and WBNI moving to 91.3, which allowed the classical music service to air uninterrupted without major NPR news programming.

In 2007, NIPR acquired WCKZ (94.1 FM) in Roanoke, then a commercial rock music station, and added it to the classical service. However, a downturn in financial support during the Great Recession prompted the station to announce in 2009 that it would sell off the Orland and Roanoke stations. In 2010, it sold the Orland station and Fort Wayne translator to Star Educational Radio Network, owner of Fort Wayne's WLAB (88.3 FM). The Roanoke station was eventually pulled off the market; it was sold in 2021 to Taylor University.

Some of WBOI's programs, especially the evening jazz programs, are produced by local, volunteer program hosts. The station carries Morning Edition, All Things Considered and other nationally broadcast public radio programs. There is a small, local news staff which covers local, state, and regional news.

The station operates 24 hours a day, utilizing some computer automation during the late night hours. Programs can be heard on the World Wide Web at www.wboi.org.

In July 2016, Peter Dominowski announced that Northeast Indiana Public Radio had purchased a two-story building on Jefferson Boulevard in downtown Fort Wayne to serve as the future headquarters for WBOI. Fundraising would continue to cover the costs of major renovations. Dominowski said it would probably be two to three years before the building could be occupied. However, the move to the downtown building is currently "on hold."

General manager Terra Brantley announced on May 19, 2022, that a new classical music program, "Classical Connection," would begin airing on June 25 from 6 to 8 p.m. on WBOI. This program is heard on Saturday evenings on WBOI. It is hosted by longtime WBNI announcer Rob Nylund, who has produced the "Classical Mornings" and "Symphonically Yours" programs on WBNI.

=== HD Radio programming ===
On October 13, 2005, WBOI became the first FM station in northeast Indiana to broadcast using the HD Radio format and the first public radio station in Indiana to offer multicasting on a digital signal. With an HD Radio tuned to 89.1 FM, two program services are available:

- WBOI-HD1 --- NPR News and Jazz Music (simulcast of WBOI's analog signal)
- WBOI-HD2 --- The Audio Reading Service from the Allen County Public Library

The classical music service primarily featured programming from ClassicalWorks in Bloomington and Classical Music Indy from Indianapolis. Classical music on WBNI ended on June 25, 2022, with the sale of WBNI to Taylor University.

== Management and finances ==
The station is supported entirely by contributions from corporations, businesses, foundations and listeners. There are pledge drives each year in spring and fall.

In 2008, Joan Baumgartner Brown was selected as president and general manager of Northeast Indiana Public Radio (NIPR). The veteran local nonprofit leader oversaw operations at WBOI and WBNI. Brown replaced Bruce Haines beginning August 4, 2008. Haines became the president and general manager of WFWA, Fort Wayne's PBS television station.

On January 20, 2009, in a letter to NIPR members, Brown announced that the board had decided to sell WBNI's three analog signals as soon as possible. Financial concerns, caused by the "weak economy" and insufficient contributions from underwriters and members failed to cover the substantial costs of acquiring and upgrading the transmitter towers in Orland and Roanoke. WBNI's programming, however, continued at 94.1 on the Roanoke tower (which was withdrawn from sale), on WBOI-HD2 and over the Internet at www.nipr.fm.

In November 2010, Brown resigned as president and general manager, prompting a search for a new NIPR executive. On December 10, 2010, NIPR announced that Will Murphy, who had been general manager of WFHB in Bloomington, Indiana, would become NIPR's president and general manager in January 2011. Murphy resigned in December 2012; a search for a new general manager was begun and on January 29, 2013, NIPR's board announced the selection of Peter Dominowski as president and general manager of NIPR. He has four decades of experience in broadcasting, mostly in public radio.

In December 2021, NIPR announced that its new president and general manager would be Terra Brantley, a former news anchor for WANE-TV. Peter Dominowski retired at the end of 2021. Terra Brantley resigned in November 2022 to return to television as a news anchor on WFFT, beginning December 12, 2022. A search began for a new president and general manager for WBOI. Meanwhile, Tim Roesler served as Interim General Manager. Travis Pope, who had been manager of Marfa Public Radio in Texas, became President and General Manager of WBOI in March 2024.

== External sources ==
- Official website
- Facility details for Facility ID 53745 (WBOI) in the FCC Licensing and Management System
- WBOI in Nielsen Audio's FM station database
