= Union (automobile) =

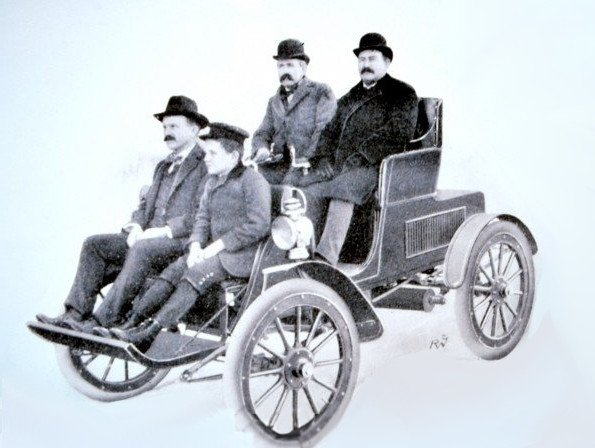
- John Lambert and brothers in 1902 'Union' automobile

Overview
- Manufacturer: Union Automobile Company
- Production: 300
- Model years: 1902–1905
- Assembly: Buckeye Manufacturing
- Designer: John William Lambert

Dimensions
- Wheelbase: 72 in (1,829 mm)
- Width: 56 in (1,422 mm)

Chronology
- Predecessor: Buckeye gasoline buggy
- Successor: Lambert automobile

The Union automobile was a vehicle manufactured by the Union Automobile Company from 1902 until 1905. It was designed by John William Lambert, who had developed the three-wheel Buckeye gasoline buggy in 1891. Over the next decade, Lambert substantially refined the vehicle, with modifications including an additional wheel, a more powerful engine, and a new transmission system. The Union Automobile Company was formed as a subsidiary of Lambert's Buckeye Manufacturing Company solely to manufacture the Union, which took its name from Union City, Indiana, the city where it was built and which endorsed its production. In total, the company built over three hundred Union automobiles, before development shifted to the Lambert automobile, the Union's successor.

== Development ==
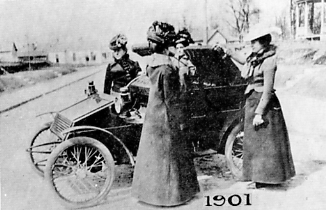
Lambert Union experimental car

The Union automobile was a modified design of a previous single-cylinder vehicle that John William Lambert had started producing in 1891 in Union City, Ohio. Experimental models were produced in 1898, 1900, and 1901; the 1900 model was the first to feature Lambert's new transmission system. Lambert, who had over six hundred patents for automobile-related parts, secured favorable concessions from the Union City chamber of commerce, in return for the vehicle being named after the city. It would be produced there by the Union Automobile Company from 1902 until 1905.

Manufactured from parts made by the Buckeye Manufacturing Company in Anderson, Indiana, the Union had entered full production by 1902, but improvements to the design were made yearly. In 1903, the motor, which consisted of a pair of opposed 6 x 4-inch (100 mm) cylinders, was moved from the front, where it had been initially placed, to the rear. In 1904 and 1905, five-seater tonneau models were produced; while the 1904 model had a 10-horsepower engine, the company produced 12 and 16 horsepower versions the following year.

Manufacturing of the automobile was moved from Union City to Anderson in 1905. Late that year, the car was redesigned, and production was started again under a new name: the Lambert automobile, while production of the union stopped entirely. In total, the company had manufactured 325 vehicles between 1902 and 1905 (25 in 1902, 50 in 1903, 100 in 1904, and 150 in 1905).

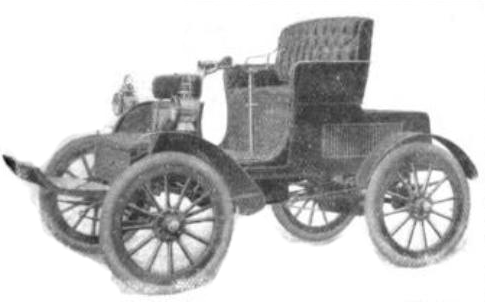
1902 Touring car

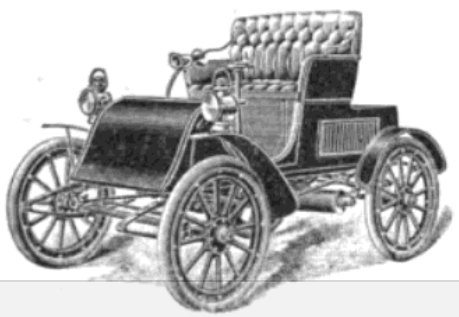
1904 Runabout

Both images are of Union brand automobiles manufactured in Union City, Indiana.

== Vehicle specifications ==
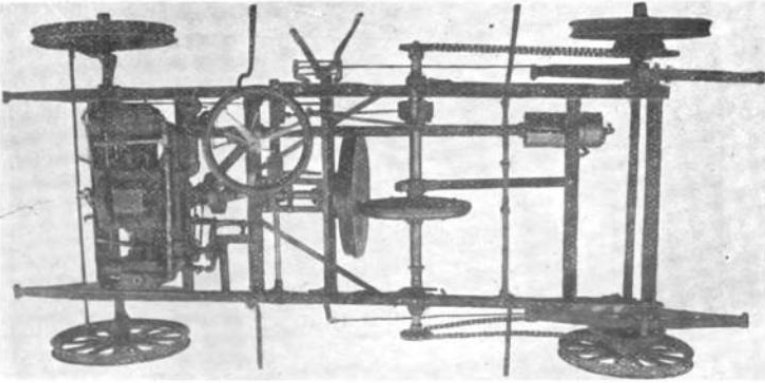
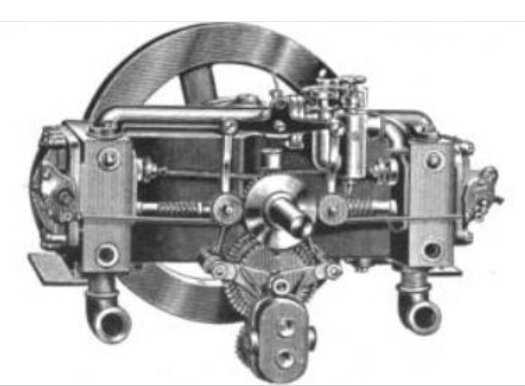
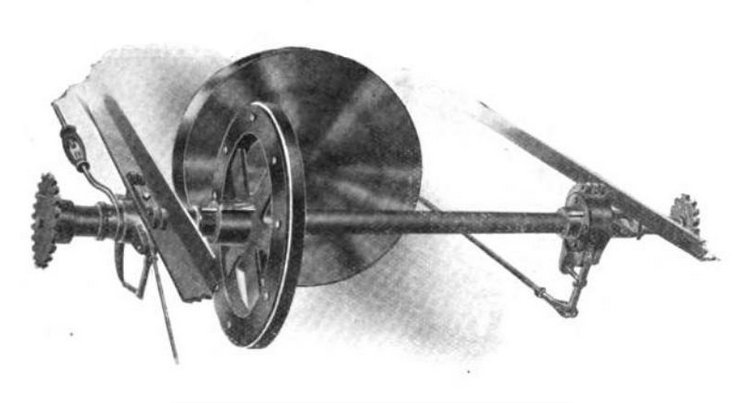
From top: the chassis; the motor; and the transmission system

The operator of the Union automobile controlled the steering wheel with his right hand and the speed-changing lever, which allowed two speeds for forward movement and one for reversing, with his left. The variation in speed was permitted by the motor, which could be varied from 150 to over 1,500 revolutions per minute. The top speed of the automobile was 20 miles per hour (32 km/h). The gasoline tank, which was hidden in the back of the seat, had a capacity sufficient to run the automobile for 125 miles (201 km) to 150 miles (240 km). The left foot controlled the handbrake; by throwing the transmission system into reverse, it operated as an emergency brake. This novel transmission system, which was connected by double chain to the rear wheels, was gearless, eliminating the jarring movements then associated with gear changes.

The automobile's motor was devised by Lambert. Started by dry cell batteries, the four-cycle gasoline engine had two opposed cylinders that produced an initial eight horsepower. Both cylinders acted on one crankshaft, producing a balanced engine. After the engine was started, an electric magneto generator sparked the combustion of the gasoline in the cylinders to keep the motor in operation. A gear from the camshaft drove a circulating pump which water-cooled the engine by means of a large radiator coil.

The automobile, which had a 6-foot (1.8 m) wheelbase and a 56-inch (1,400 mm) axle track, was equipped with 34-inch (860 mm) wheels and 3.5-inch (89 mm) wide pneumatic tires and enameled sheet steel mud guards; kerosene oil lamps were additionally provided for evening travel. In 1902 and 1903, a front seat was provided for two people, which could be closed up and the vehicle then used as a four-person runabout vehicle. It cost $1,250 ($46,514 in 2025), with the option of a $25 dos-à-dos (rear-facing) seat which converted the car into a six-passenger vehicle.

The final model produced by the Union Automobile Company was a 1905 Model E. Fitted with a detachable side entrance tonneau body, which sat three people, the car was upholstered to a high standard: genuine leather was used in combination with a soft insulation material and springs in both the seat cushions and the back. It could hold up to five passengers, and was equipped with two oil lamps, a horn, and necessary maintenance tools, for a total price of $1200 ($43,000 in 2025) ($1125 without the tonneau).

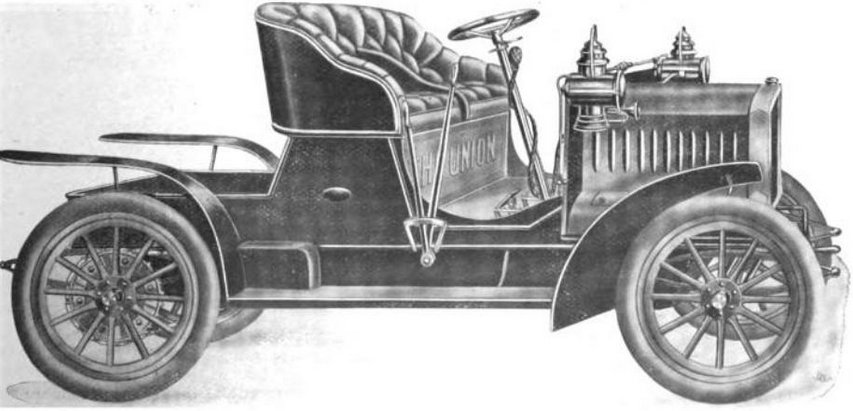
Union model E without tonneau

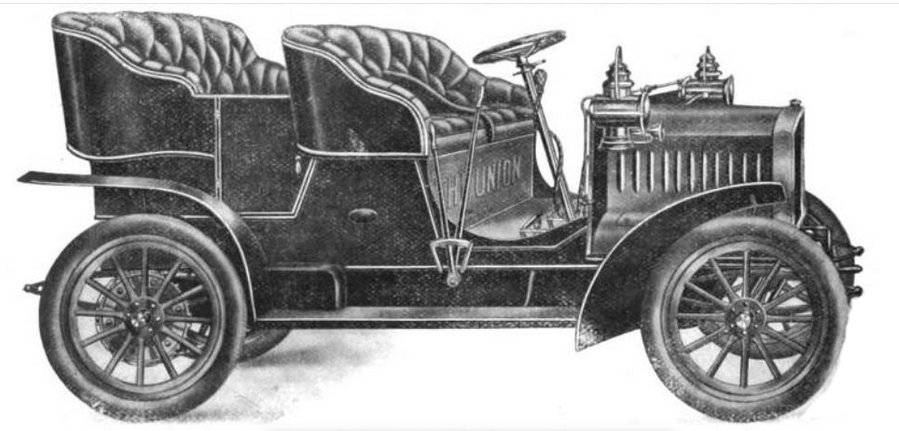
Union model E with a tonneau

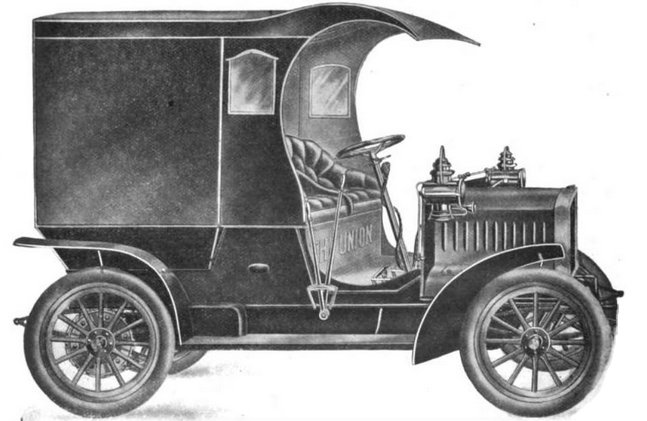
Union model E delivery wagon

Union automobile Model E at different stages of style development.

== See also ==
- Lambert Automobile Company
- Lambert Gas and Gasoline Engine Company

== Sources ==
- Georgano (V1), G.N. (2000). Beaulieu Encyclopedia of Automobile, Volume 1. Fitzroy Dearborn Publishers. ISBN 9781579582937.
- Georgano (V2), G.N. (2000). Beaulieu Encyclopedia of Automobile, Volume 2 (M-Z). Fitzroy Dearborn Publishers. ISBN 1-57958-293-1.
- Kimes, Beverly Rae (1996). Standard Catalog American Cars, 1804-1942. Krause Publications. ISBN 9780873414289.
