= WRNP =

Radio station in Roanoke–Fort Wayne, Indiana

Coordinates: 40°58′54.7″N 85°16′40.7″W

Roanoke, Indiana; United States
- Broadcast area: Fort Wayne, Indiana
- Frequency: 94.1 MHz
- Branding: Rhythm & Praise 94.1

Programming
- Format: Urban gospel

Ownership
- Owner: Taylor University Broadcasting, Inc.
- Sister stations: WBCL

History
- First air date: December 17, 1990
- Former call signs: WHOR (1989); WQTX (1989–1993); WGL-FM (1993–1997); WYSR (1997–2001); WCKZ (2001–2007); WBNI-FM (2007–2021)
- Former frequencies: 105.1 MHz (1990–1992)
- Call sign meaning: "Rhythm and Praise"

Technical information
- Licensing authority: FCC
- Facility ID: 46434
- Class: A
- ERP: 3,400 watts
- HAAT: 97 meters (318 ft)

Links
- Public license information: Public file; LMS
- Webcast: Listen live
- Website: rnp941.org

WRNP (94.1 FM) is a non-commercial FM gospel radio station licensed to Roanoke, Indiana, serving the Fort Wayne area. It is owned by Taylor University Broadcasting, and airs an urban gospel radio format, known as "Rhythm & Praise 94.1".

Taylor University also operates a network of contemporary Christian music stations in the region led by WBCL (90.3 FM). Prior to being WRNP, 94.1 operated as a commercial radio station from 1990 to 2007 and as WBNI-FM, a classical radio station owned by Northeast Indiana Public Radio, from 2007 to 2021.

== History ==
=== Commercial years ===
The station began broadcasting as news/talk outlet WQTX on 105.1 MHz on December 17, 1990. It was leased from original owner Judith Selby by the Kovas family, owners of WGL (1250 AM), and simulcast that station. The station did not remain on 105.1 long; it was ordered to move to 94.1 MHz in 1991 to make way for an upgrade to WQTZ, which had been at 92.7 MHz.

By mid-1992, however, Selby had taken WQTX silent. It was acquired for $100,000 by Frank Kovas, making it an outright sister to WGL, and became WGL-FM from its present 94.1 MHz dial position at the start of 1993, resuming the simulcast of the AM station.

In 1997, WGL-FM moved to 102.3 MHz, and 94.1 relaunched as adult contemporary WYSR "Star 94.1". It then flipped to rhythmic oldies in 1999 as "Y-94". Another shuffle of formats in the Kovas cluster changed WYSR to urban adult contemporary WCKZ "The Wiz", previously on 102.3 in 2001; this was revised further to classic rock as "Z-94" by 2007.

=== Classical years ===
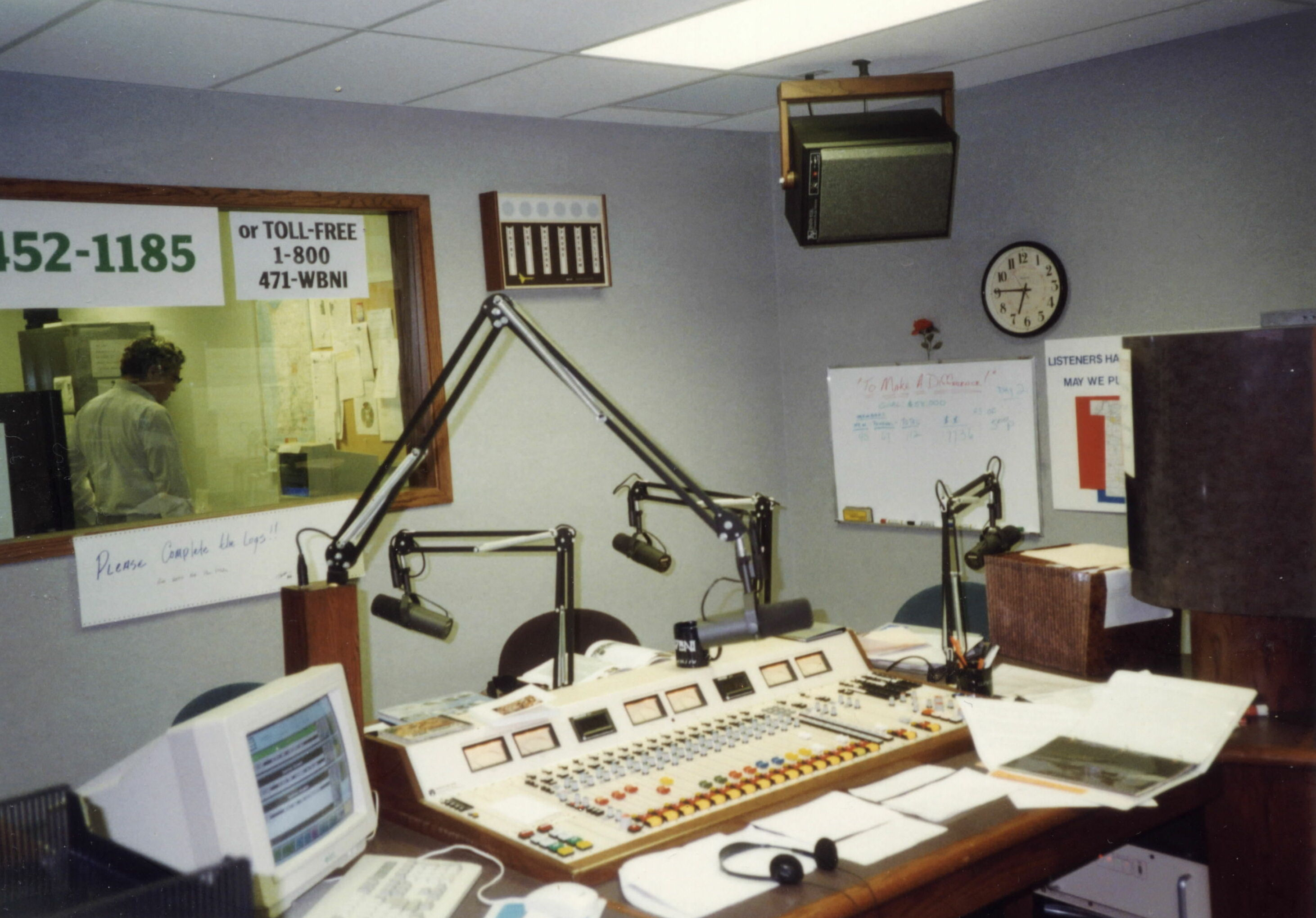
WBNI's original broadcast studio during a pledge drive. WBNI broadcasts later moved to another studio in the same building.

In February 2007, Northeast Indiana Public Radio (NIPR) announced plans to acquire WCKZ for $2.5 million and a fundraising drive to make the change possible. The change took place on May 1, 2007, providing a stronger signal for the classical music programming that had been carried only on a transmitter in Orland (which took the WCKZ call sign, with 94.1 becoming WBNI-FM) and a translator in Fort Wayne.

On January 20, 2009, citing low financial support, the Great Recession and the debt load on the 2007 purchase of the former WCKZ, NIPR announced its intention to sell the transmitters associated with the classical service and move it exclusively to HD Radio and streaming.

On April 15, 2010, NIPR announced the sale of WCKZ and the 10-watt Fort Wayne translator to Star Educational Media Network, owner of WLAB (88.3 FM), which was concluded in June.

In July 2016, NIPR purchased a two-story building on Jefferson Boulevard in downtown Fort Wayne to serve as the future headquarters for WBNI and WBOI, with fundraising to cover the costs of major renovations.

=== Sale to Taylor University ===
In June 2021, NIPR announced its sale of WBNI-FM to Taylor University, owner of contemporary Christian music station WBCL in Fort Wayne, with the $350,000 proceeds going to fund digital equipment upgrades; as had been planned a decade prior, the classical service would continue on HD radio and streaming. The new frequency would carry the "Rhythm & Praise" gospel format that had been on WBCL's HD2 subchannel. The sale closed on September 1, at which time 94.1 became WRNP and began broadcasting the gospel music programming.
