= Lambert (automobile) =

American automobile manufacturing company

- Industry: Automotive
- Founded: 1906; 120 years ago
- Founder: John William Lambert
- Defunct: 1918; 108 years ago
- Headquarters: Anderson, Indiana, United States

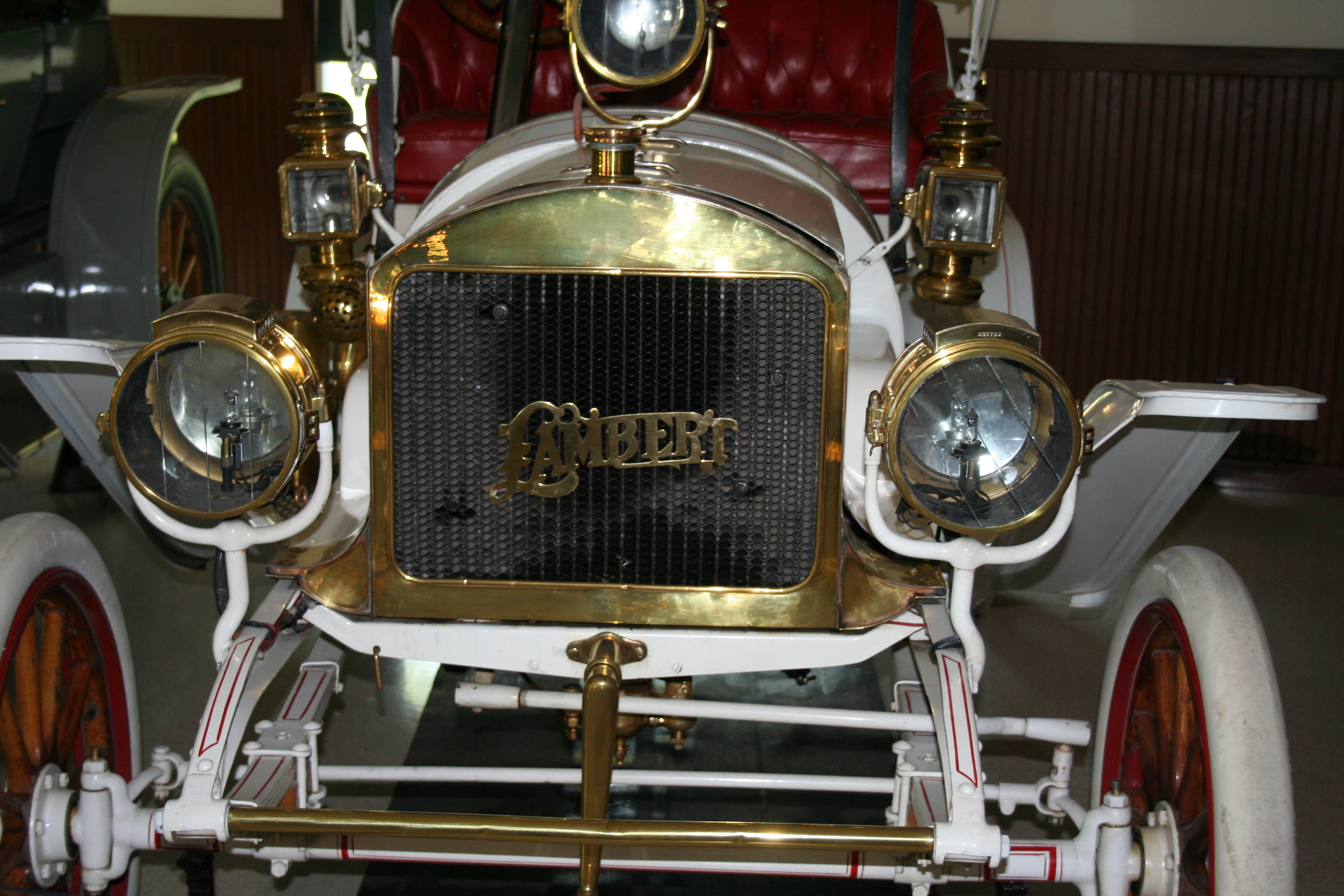

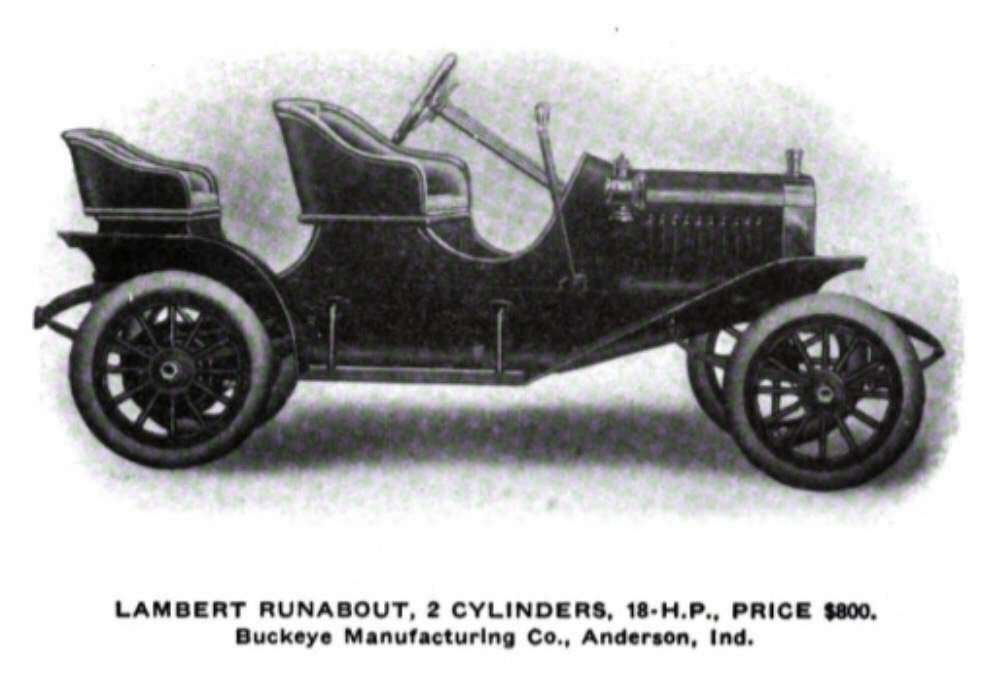
Lambert Runabout (1908)

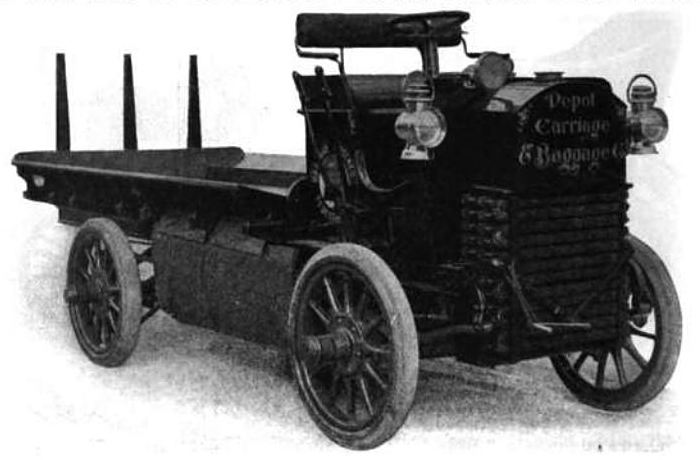
1906 Lambert model A truck

Lambert advertisement Model A (1907)

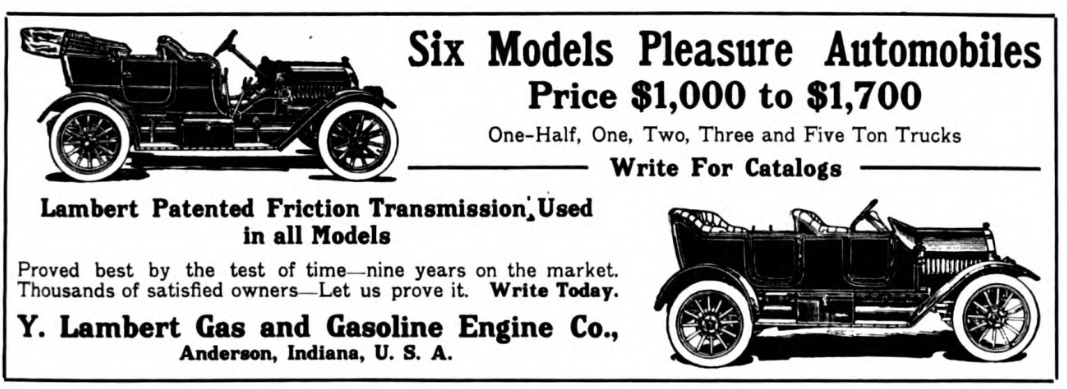
Lambert advertisement (1911)

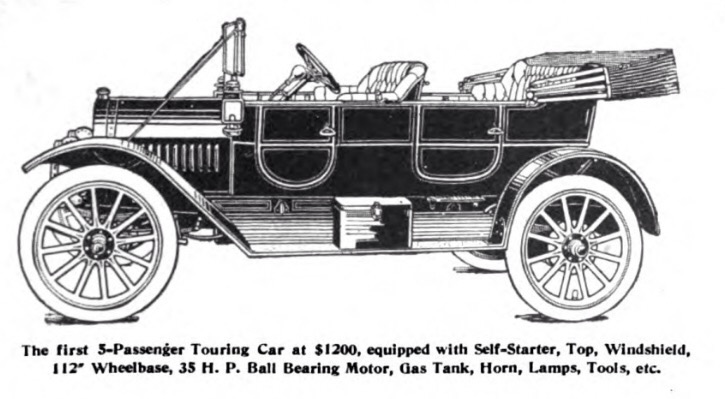
Lambert Model 66 (1912)

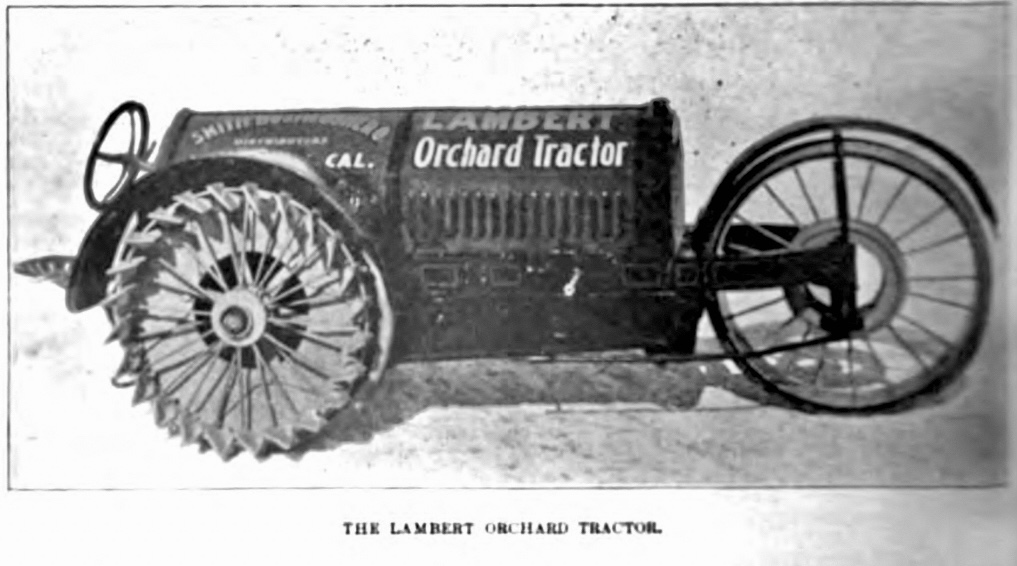
Lambert Orchard (1912–1916)

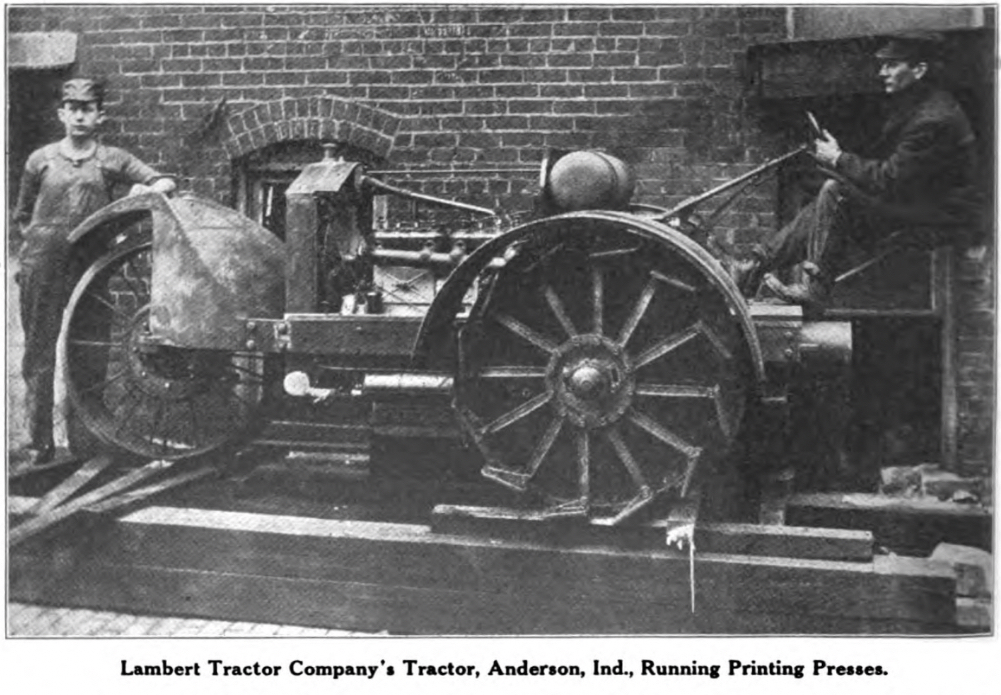
Lambert (1913)

The Lambert Automobile Company was a United States automobile manufacturing company which produced the Lambert automobile from 1905 to 1916. The company was founded by automotive pioneer John William Lambert and was based in Anderson, Indiana.

In 1891, John Lambert successfully tested and drove a three-wheeled, surrey topped, gasoline powered runabout of his own design. Despite the success of the car, the vehicle was a marketing failure. Priced at $550, not a single party was interested. Undaunted, Lambert turned his attention to the manufacture of stationary gasoline engines. He selected Anderson, Indiana as the site for his Buckeye Manufacturing Company. During this time he developed the friction transmission that would be a feature on all of his cars. He made an unsuccessful attempt to buy out a model called the Buckeye in 1895. Lambert's first automobile marketing success was a model called the Union which was released in 1902. In 1906, he produced the first Lambert. With this line Lambert established himself as one of the more successful automobile manufacturers of the era. In addition to cars, Lambert produced auto fire engines, trucks, gasoline engines and Steel-hoof farm tractors. The Buckeye Manufacturing Company produced the Lambert automobile through 1917, with the maximum production from 1907 to 1910, when the firm produced an average of 2,000 cars a year.

== See also ==
- Buckeye gasoline buggy
- Buckeye Manufacturing Company
- John William Lambert
- Lambert Automobile Company
- Union Automobile Company
- Union (automobile)

== Sources ==
- "Trucks and Car Motor Car made by Lambert". Anderson Daily Bulletin. Anderson, Indiana. 28 December 1967. p. 5 – via Newspapers.com.
- Dolnar, Hugh (1906). "The Lambert, 1906 Line of Automobiles". Cycle and Automobile Trade Journal. 10 (7): 225–229.
- Lucendo, Jorge (2019). Cars of Legend. Jorge Lucendo Publications.
- Naldrett, Alan (2016). Lost Car Companies of Detroit. Arcadia Publishing Incorporated. ISBN 9781625856494.
- Kimes, Beverly Rae (1996). Standard Catalog American Cars, 1805–1942. Krause Publications. ISBN 0-87341-428-4.
- Wise, David Burgess (2000). The New Illustrated Encyclopedia of Automobiles. Edison, New Jersey: Quantum Publishing. ISBN 0-7858-1106-0.
