= WCVM =

Coordinates: 41.742°N 85.243°W

Simulcast of WBCL, Fort Wayne
- Bronson, Michigan; United States
- Frequency: 94.7 MHz
- Branding: The WBCL Radio Network

Programming
- Format: Contemporary Christian

Ownership
- Owner: Taylor University Broadcasting

History
- First air date: June 26, 1996

Technical information
- Licensing authority: FCC
- Facility ID: 41670
- Class: A
- ERP: 4,000 watts
- HAAT: 123 meters (404 ft)

Links
- Public license information: Public file; LMS
- Website: www.wbcl.org

WCVM (94.7 FM) is a radio station licensed to Bronson, Michigan. The station rebroadcasts WBCL, the contemporary Christian music station owned and operated by Taylor University in Fort Wayne, Indiana. The station's transmitter is located near the corner of County Roads E700N and N950E, southwest of Greenfield Mills, Indiana.

Prior to being purchased by Taylor University, the station had aired the Christian modern rock format of Calvary Chapel (originally known as "Effect Radio" and then "Radio X").

== Sources ==
- Michiguide.com - WCVM History
