= Sylvester Hotchkiss =

American architect

Sylvester Hotchkiss, also known as S. C. Hotchkiss, was a Chicago-based architect who also worked in Arkansas.

Works by Hotchkiss include:

- Lambert House (Monticello, Arkansas), a Colonial Revival house at 204 W. Jackson Street in Monticello, built in 1905 and listed on the National Register of Historic Places in 1983
- Hotchkiss House (Monticello, Arkansas), at 577 N. Boyd St., Monticello, Arkansas, also NRHP-listed
- Allen House (Monticello, Arkansas), designed and built by Hotchkiss, at 705 North Main, Monticello
