= WBCW =

Simulcast of WBCL, Fort Wayne
- Upland, Indiana; United States
- Broadcast area: Taylor University campus and surrounding community
- Frequency: 89.7 MHz

Programming
- Format: Christian adult contemporary

Ownership
- Owner: Taylor University; (Taylor University Broadcasting, Inc.)

History
- First air date: 1995
- Former call signs: WTUR (1995–2014)

Technical information
- Licensing authority: FCC
- Facility ID: 64659
- Class: A
- ERP: 150 watts
- HAAT: 34.0 meters (111.5 ft)
- Transmitter coordinates: 40°25′2.1″N 85°29′30.9″W

Links
- Public license information: Public file; LMS

WBCW (89.7 FM) is a radio station broadcasting a Christian adult contemporary format that is licensed to Upland, Indiana, United States. The station is owned by Taylor University. It operates as a simulcast of WBCL 90.3 FM in Fort Wayne, Indiana.

WBCW was assigned the WTUR call letters by the Federal Communications Commission (FCC) on August 11, 1995. On November 28, 2014, the station's call sign changed to the current WBCW.
