= WJYW =

Coordinates: 40°11′32″N 84°47′58″W

Repeater of WLAB Fort Wayne
- Union City, Indiana; United States
- Broadcast area: Union City, Greenville, Winchester and surrounding area.
- Frequency: 88.9 MHz
- Branding: "Star 88.3"

Programming
- Format: Contemporary Christian music

Ownership
- Owner: Star Educational Media Network, Inc.

Technical information
- Licensing authority: FCC
- Class: A (non commercial)
- ERP: 4,100 watts
- HAAT: 285 feet (87 meters)

Links
- Public license information: Public file; LMS
- Webcast: Listen Live
- Website: star883.com

WJYW ("Star 88.3") is a local radio station licensed to Union City, Indiana and broadcasting from neighboring Union City, Ohio at 88.9 MHz.

WJYW also operates the following FM translator in the Richmond, Indiana area:

Call sign	Frequency	City of license	FID	ERP (W)	HAAT	Class	FCC info
W247DN	97.3 FM	Richmond, Indiana	140566	55	75 m (246 ft)	D	LMS
