= Duryea Brothers =

American automotive pioneers

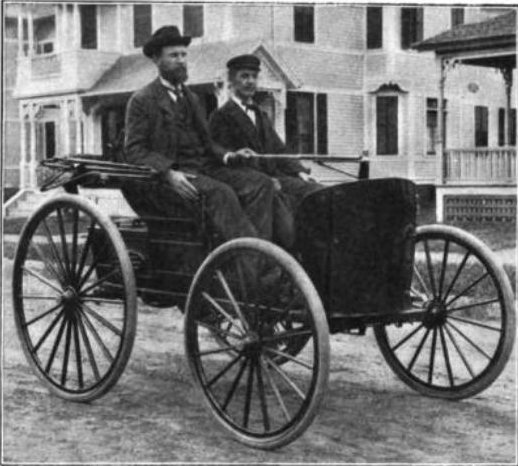
J. Frank Duryea (right) with Charles Duryea

The Duryea brothers, Charles Duryea (December 15, 1861 – September 28, 1938) and J. Frank Duryea (October 8, 1869 – February 15, 1967) were early pioneers in the automobile industry. The brothers grew up in the town of Wyoming, Illinois. They are known for winning the Chicago Times-Herald race, the first automobile race in United States history.

== Main articles ==
- Charles Duryea
- J. Frank Duryea

== See also ==
- Duryea Motor Wagon Company
- Duryea Power
- Duryea Motor Wagon
- Stevens-Duryea
- Sylph (bicycle brand)
