= Buckeye Manufacturing Company =

Defunct American motor vehicle manufacturer

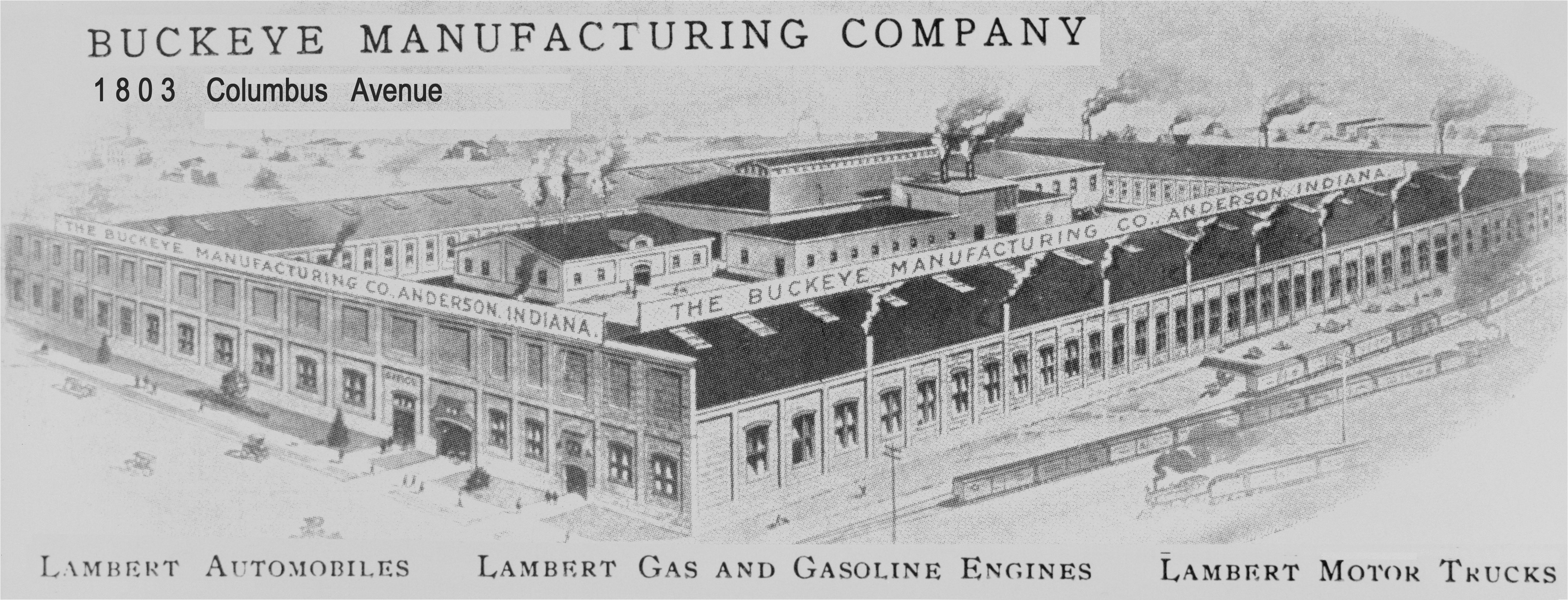
- circa 1915
- Company type: Automobile Manufacturing
- Industry: Automotive
- Founded: 1884
- Founder: John William Lambert
- Defunct: 1917
- Headquarters: 1801-1809 Columbus Ave, Anderson, Indiana, United States
- Area served: United States
- Products: Vehicles; Automotive parts

The Buckeye Manufacturing Company was a company noted for manufacturing gasoline engines and farm implements. It manufactured the engines for its sister company, the Union Automobile Company.

In time the Lambert founded automobile related subsidiary companies such as the Union Automobile Company, the Lambert Automobile Company, and the Lambert Gas and Gasoline Engine Company. Buckeye Manufacturing Company manufactured the components of the cars assembled by these subsidiaries. The company later produced automobiles and it continued until 1917.

== History ==
A single Buckeye gasoline buggy automobile was built by the company in 1890, and offered for sale in 1891, though none were produced.

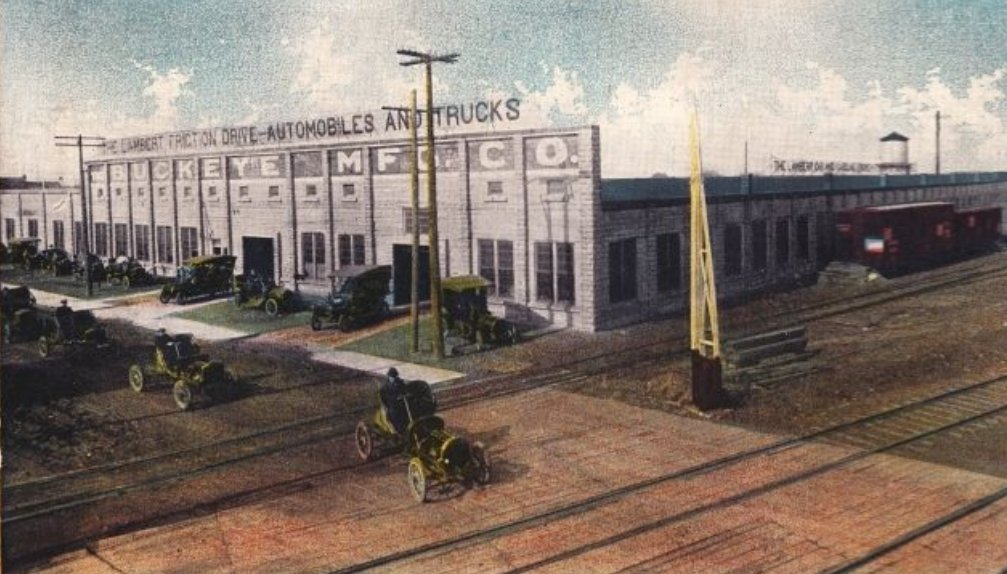
Buckeye Manufacturing Company in Anderson, Indiana (1910)

== See also ==
- Union automobile
- Lambert automobile

== Sources ==
- Forkner, John L. (1914). History of Madison County, IN. The Lewis Publishing Company.
