= WBCL =

Radio station at Taylor University in Fort Wayne, Indiana

Coordinates: 41.104°N 85.196°W

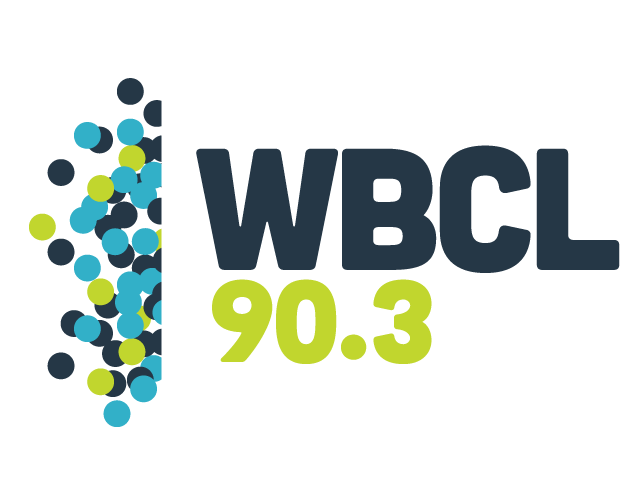

Fort Wayne, Indiana; United States
- Broadcast area: Fort Wayne, Indiana
- Frequency: 90.3 MHz (HD Radio)

Programming
- Format: Christian adult contemporary
- Subchannels: HD2: Urban gospel (WRNP simulcast)

Ownership
- Owner: Taylor University; (Taylor University Broadcasting, Inc.)

History
- First air date: January 8, 1976
- Call sign meaning: We Broadcast Christ's Love

Technical information
- Licensing authority: FCC
- Facility ID: 64658
- Class: B
- ERP: 26,000 watts
- HAAT: 211 meters (692 ft)

Links
- Public license information: Public file; LMS
- Webcast: Listen live; HD2: Listen live
- Website: www.wbcl.org; HD2: rnp941.org

WBCL is an FM radio station located in Fort Wayne, Indiana, United States. The station operates on the FM radio frequency of 90.3 MHz. WBCL is owned by Taylor University in Upland, Indiana with its studios located at the university's Fort Wayne campus.

Its current programming consists of Christian adult contemporary music.

== Repeaters and translators ==
WBCL maintains a network of repeaters and translators that extends its reach into Eastern Indiana, Northwest Ohio and Southern Michigan.

- WBCW 89.7 FM in Upland, Indiana
- WBCJ 88.1 FM in Spencerville, Ohio
- WBCY 89.5 FM in Archbold, Ohio
- WCVM 94.7 in Bronson, Michigan
- WTPG 88.9 in Whitehouse, Ohio
- W291AH 106.1 FM in Muncie, Indiana
- W249BT 97.7 in Adrian, Michigan
- W258CE 99.5 in Findlay, Ohio
- W267BN 101.3 in Marion, Indiana
