= WEAX =

Radio station in Angola, Indiana

Coordinates: 41.6867°N 84.9980°W

- Angola, Indiana; United States
- Frequency: 88.3 MHz
- Branding: Star 88.3

Programming
- Format: Christian Contemporary

Ownership
- Owner: Star Educational Media Network, Inc.
- Sister stations: WCKZ, WLAB

History
- First air date: September 1979

Technical information
- Licensing authority: FCC
- Facility ID: 67795
- Class: A
- ERP: 570 watts
- HAAT: 91 meters (299 ft)

Links
- Public license information: Public file; LMS
- Webcast: Listen Live
- Website: https://star883.com/

WEAX (88.3 FM) is a Christian contemporary radio station in Angola, Indiana, and is owned by Star Educational Media Network, Inc.

WEAX began broadcasting in September 1979. It was formerly the student run station Trine University and aired an Indie/Alternative radio format. On July 15, 2019, Trine University shut down FM broadcasting of WEAX, and the station was sold to Star Educational Media Network, Inc. for $40,000; the sale was consummated on January 17, 2020. However, the station remained silent, because the tower that had used by Trine University was on property owned by the City of Angola, and the city refused to allow the tower to be used by a Christian broadcaster. The station resumed operations on July 13, 2020.
