= WBCY =

Simulcast of WBCL, Fort Wayne
- Archbold, Ohio; United States
- Frequency: 89.5 MHz
- Branding: The WBCL Radio Network

Programming
- Format: Christian adult contemporary

Ownership
- Owner: Taylor University; (Taylor University Broadcasting, Inc.)

History
- First air date: November 30, 1992

Technical information
- Licensing authority: FCC
- Facility ID: 64657
- Class: B1
- ERP: 20,000 watts
- HAAT: 96 meters (315 ft)
- Transmitter coordinates: 41°28′59.2″N 84°16′57.8″W
- Translators: 97.7 W249BT (Adrian); 99.5 W258CE (Findlay)

Links
- Public license information: Public file; LMS
- Webcast: Listen live
- Website: www.wbcl.org

WBCY (89.5 FM) is a radio station licensed to Archbold, Ohio. The station rebroadcasts WBCL, the Christian adult contemporary music station owned and operated by Taylor University in Fort Wayne, Indiana. The station's transmitter is located near the corner of County Roads W and 22, southeast of Archbold.
