= Lambert House (Monticello, Arkansas) =

Historic house in Arkansas, United States

- U.S. National Register of Historic Places
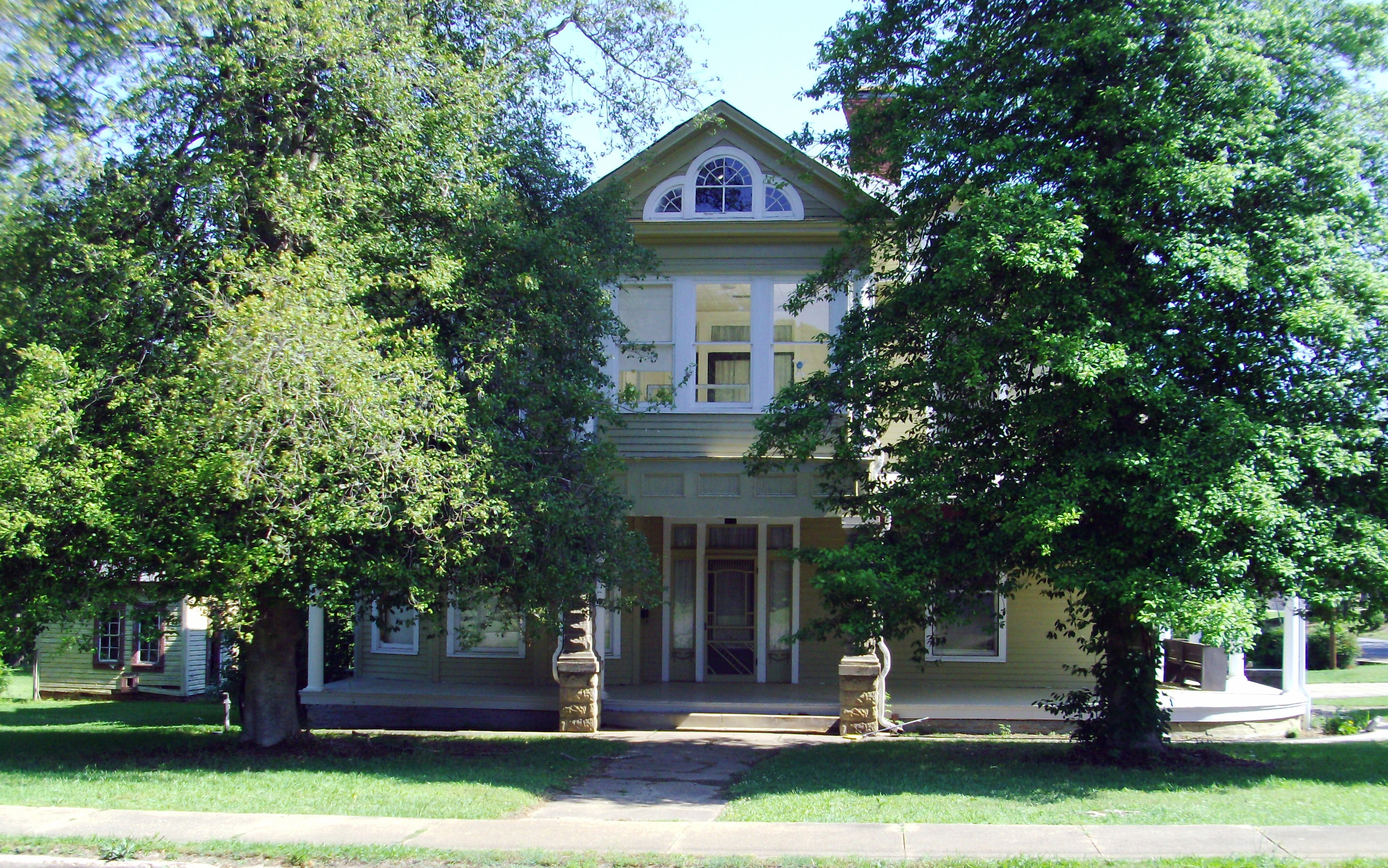

- Location within Arkansas Location within the United States
- Location: 204 W. Jackson St., Monticello, Arkansas
- Coordinates: 33°37′35″N 91°47′34″W
- Built: 1905
- Architect: S.C. Hotchkiss
- Architectural style: Colonial Revival
- NRHP reference No.: 83003545
- Added to NRHP: December 22, 1983

The Lambert House is a historic house at 204 West Jackson Street in Monticello, Arkansas. The Colonial Revival house was built in 1905 to a design by noted local architect S.C. Hotchkiss. It was built for Walter Lambert, who owned one of Monticello's first grocery stores. The two-story wood-frame house is roughly rectangular in shape, with projecting gable sections and a rear ell. Its main facade is dominated by a two-story portico, whose second story has been enclosed as a sunroom. The lower portion of the portico is supported by granite columns, and the entablature is supported by Ionic columns, which are still visible despite the sunroom conversion.

Also known as Miles House, it was listed on the National Register of Historic Places in 1983.

== See also ==
- National Register of Historic Places listings in Drew County, Arkansas
