= Union Automobile Company =

Defunct American motor vehicle manufacturer

- Type: Manufacturing
- Industry: Gasoline engine automobiles
- Founded: 1901
- Founder: John William Lambert
- Defunct: 1905
- Headquarters: Union, Ohio, United States
- Area served: United States
- Products: Commercial gasoline engine automobiles

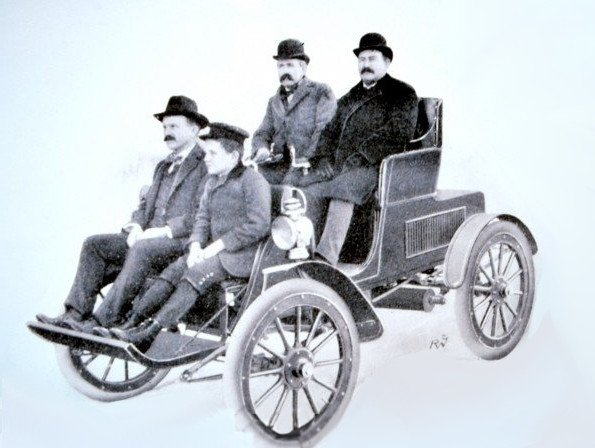
Lambert and brothers in 1902 'Union' automobile

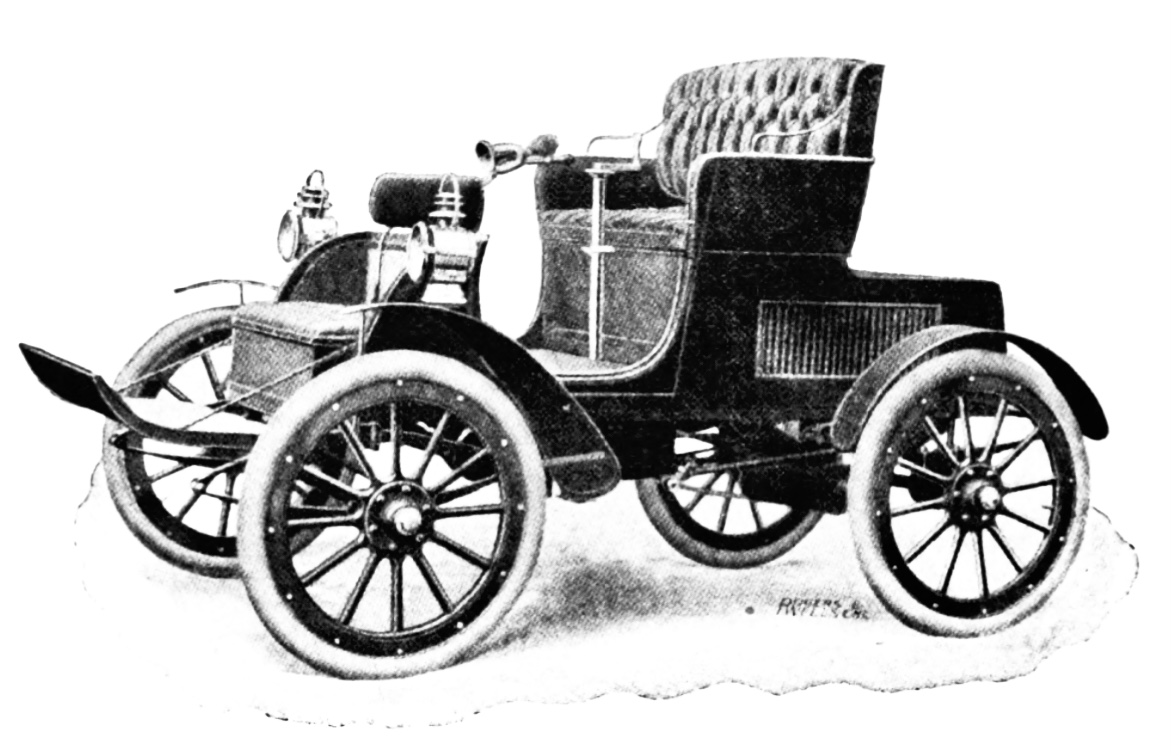
The Union Type A (1903).

The Union Automobile Company was an automobile factory to manufacture the Union automobile through the Buckeye Manufacturing Company. It began manufacturing automobiles in 1902 and produced them through 1905. The company was located in Union City, Indiana.

== History ==
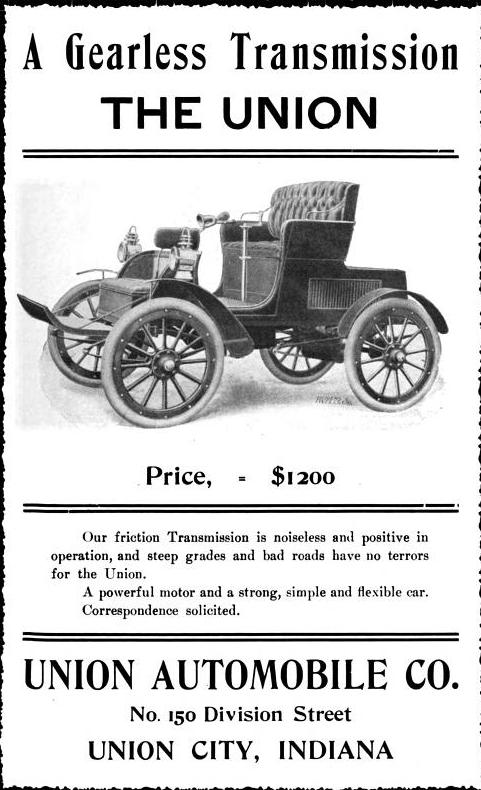
1903 Union Automobile Ad

The money pooled together for the founding of the Union Automobile Company was $50,000 ($1.94 million in 2025). The company started constructing buildings in Union City in January 1901 for the assembly of automobiles.

== Models ==
The Union Automobile Company production started in 1902. It manufactured in 1903 a gasoline runabout automobile.
