= WLAB =

Contemporary Christian radio station in Fort Wayne, Indiana

WLAB-FM (STAR 88.3)
- Fort Wayne, Indiana; United States
- Frequency: 88.3 MHz
- Branding: STAR 88.3

Programming
- Format: Contemporary Christian

Ownership
- Owner: STAR Educational Media Network

History
- First air date: August 23, 1976

Technical information
- Licensing authority: FCC
- Facility ID: 28467
- Class: B1
- ERP: 7,500 watts
- HAAT: 185 meters (607 ft)
- Transmitter coordinates: 41.104°N 85.191°W
- Translators: 89.7 W209BA (Kendallville); 90.9 W215BB (Warsaw); 99.9 W260BR (Auburn)
- Repeater: 91.3 WCKZ (Orland)

Links
- Public license information: (STAR 88.3) Public file; LMS
- Webcast: Listen live
- Website: star883.com/whats-playing/

WLAB (88.3 FM) is a non-commercial radio station licensed to Fort Wayne, Indiana, United States. It is owned by the Star Educational Media Network and broadcasts a contemporary Christian format.

In addition to its main transmitter at 88.3, it is simulcast over WCKZ (91.3 FM) in Orland, Indiana, which expands the station's coverage area to include Angola and LaGrange, Indiana, and into Coldwater and Sturgis, Michigan. The station is also relayed over low-power translators W209BA (89.7 FM) in Kendallville, W260BR (99.9 FM) in Auburn, W215BB (90.9 FM) in Warsaw, and W247DN (97.3 FM) Richmond all in Indiana.

== History ==
WLAB began in 1976 as WLHI-FM as an educational tool for students at Concordia Lutheran High School in Fort Wayne. In 1979, the FCC placed new requirements upon educational stations such that the high school could not continue operating the station. The Lutheran Association for Broadcasting was organized for the purpose of continuing the radio station. The call letters were changed to WLAB and a statement of purpose was outlined.

Concordia Theological Seminary, a seminary of the Lutheran Church – Missouri Synod (LCMS) in Fort Wayne, provided space for the studio and the Indiana District of the LCMS provided a loan so that basic FCC-required equipment could be purchased. But that, along with the lack of part-time help and programming, was not enough to attract a large audience or financial support.

In April 1987, the Indiana District assumed responsibility for the station. At its direction, the leadership at the station was asked to raise all of its own support to cover normal operating expenses. This was done through changes in programming, staffing, and fund-raising efforts. By 2001, WLAB's listeners and other partners were providing the entire operating budget of the station, and the long-term debt to the district was completely retired.

The station was also able to expand coverage into other communities and by 1998 could be heard in the communities of Kendallville and Warsaw.

In March 2000, Jim Zix submitted his resignation as general manager. The board later appointed Melissa Montana as the new general manager. She immediately appointed Don Buettner as Program Director. In November 2002, consultant John Frost was brought in to help the station identify opportunities for further growth. Through changes in staffing, programming, and a branding change, WLAB became STAR 88-3 and within three years, the station's audience size nearly doubled.

While the Indiana District knew the potential for the station's growth, it also recognized the opportunity to increase support for its missions programs, so after 25 years, it decided to sell the station. The STAR 88-3 leadership team formed a new company and began the work of buying the station.

STAR Educational Media Network, under the direction of Melissa Montana, Don Buettner, and Richard Cummins (Executive VP-Development) became the new owners of the station in November 2009. A new board of directors was also formed.

== STAR 88.3 ==
After five hours of broadcasting construction sound effects on Friday October 3, 2003, WLAB relaunched as STAR 88.3 at 5:00 pm Eastern time, kicking off the new era of the station with "Live Out Loud" by Steven Curtis Chapman. At that time the station also eliminated the few remaining daily talk programs being broadcast, opting for 24 hours of Adult Contemporary Christian music.

== Awards ==
In 2009, STAR 88.3 was awarded Station of the Year (Small Market) by the Gospel Music Association as well as the Rob Gregory Award for Community Service. STAR has gone on to win the Christian Music Broadcasters annual Station of the Year (Medium Market) Award in 2013, 2017, and 2022.

== Acquisitions ==
In 2010, STAR purchased WCKZ-FM, licensed to Orland at 91.3 FM, which covers the Angola area (commonly referred to as "The Lakes" area.). In 2015, STAR acquired WJYW-FM, licensed to Union City, Ohio, at 88.9 FM whose primary coverage is in Darke County. Since 1996, repeater signals (translator sites) in Kendallville, Warsaw, Auburn, and Richmond complement the network. In 2020, STAR was able to purchase WEAX-FM, licensed to Angola at 88.3 FM from Trine University. Since that station operates on the same 88.3 FM frequency as WLAB, it was an opportunity for STAR so that it could more easily expand its reach in Northern Indiana on that frequency.

== Programming ==
The Brant Hansen Show airs daily from 6:00 am to 10:00 am and is produced and distributed by the Christian-FM network.

Josh & Friends airs daily from 10:00 am to 1:00 pm and is hosted by Josh Raines, the station's vice president of culture and strategy. The program features a regular schedule of local guests who co-host the show with Raines discussing relevant topics and encouraging STAR's audience.

Melissa Montana is also the afternoon personality from 3:00 pm to 7:00 pm. Her regular feature "Conversations" airs daily at 4:30 pm. Topics generally include issues pertaining to local concerns in the area. Local events are also featured as well as artist interviews and national authors and speakers.

Keep The Faith is hosted by Penny and is heard weeknights from 7:00 pm to 12:00 am. Penny was a former evening personality at the now-defunct WFSH "The Fish" in Atlanta, Georgia. This is a daily version of the nationally syndicated show that airs on Sundays and features "contagious encouragement" with content featuring national guests of all walks of life targeted to appeal to listeners no matter what stage they are at in their faith journey. The weekend version of "Keep the Faith" is co-hosted by Keith Stevens, morning personality at KTIS-FM in Minneapolis, Minnesota, and national voice talent Donna Cruz, both of whom have other 30 years of Christian radio experience.
