= Sylph (bicycle brand) =

19th century bicycle brand

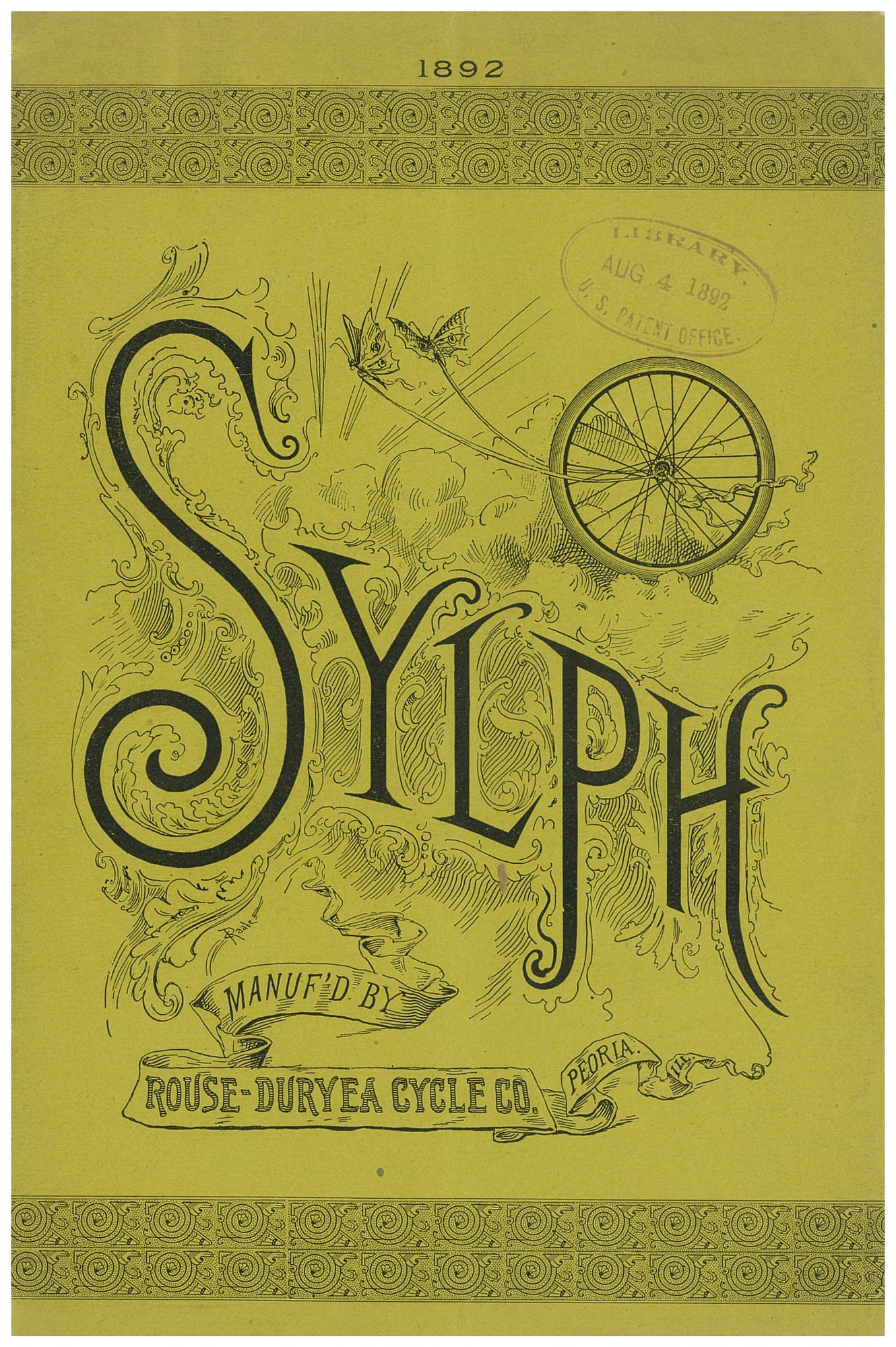
Sylph Bicycle Brand Advertisement

Sylph was a brand of bicycle designed by Charles Duryea in the late 1800s. They were initially manufactured by Ames Manufacturing Company, in Chicopee, Massachusetts, starting in 1890, and then by Rouse and Hazard, in Peoria, Illinois, from 1892 to 1898.

== Notoriety ==
- One Sylph model had a smaller wheel in front and handlebars mounted below the seat that came up on either side of it.
- A photograph of a "Duryea Sylph springframe safety bicycle" was used by David V. Herlihy for his 'Bicycle, The History'.
- Rouse and Hazard manufactured 200,000 Sylph bicycles between 1894 and 1898
- The Sylph brand won "top honors" at the Chicago World's Fair in 1893.
- The Sylph model A incorporated a spring suspension it the frame.

== Gallery ==
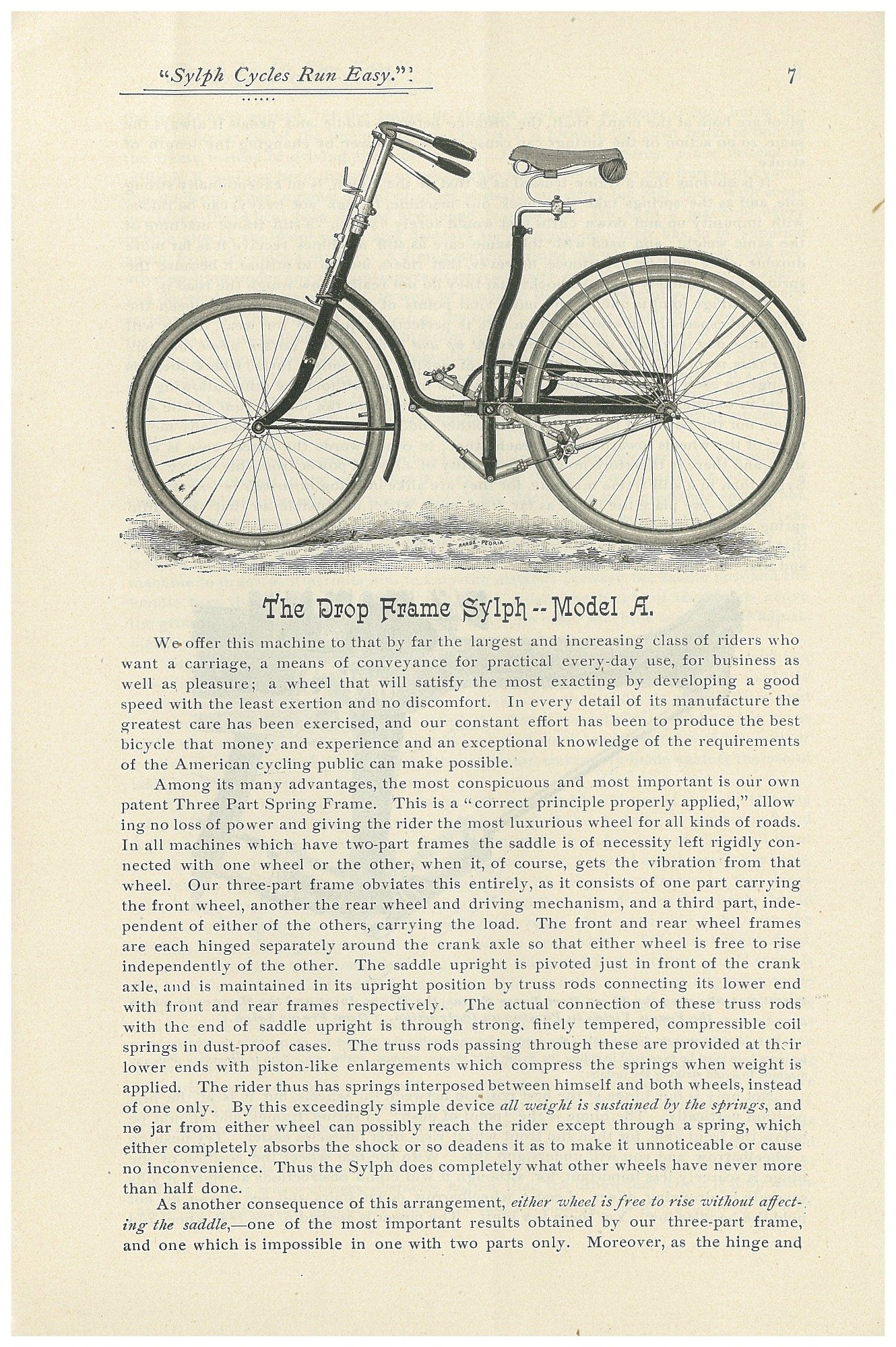
Sylph Model A. Drop Frame Bicycle Advertisement

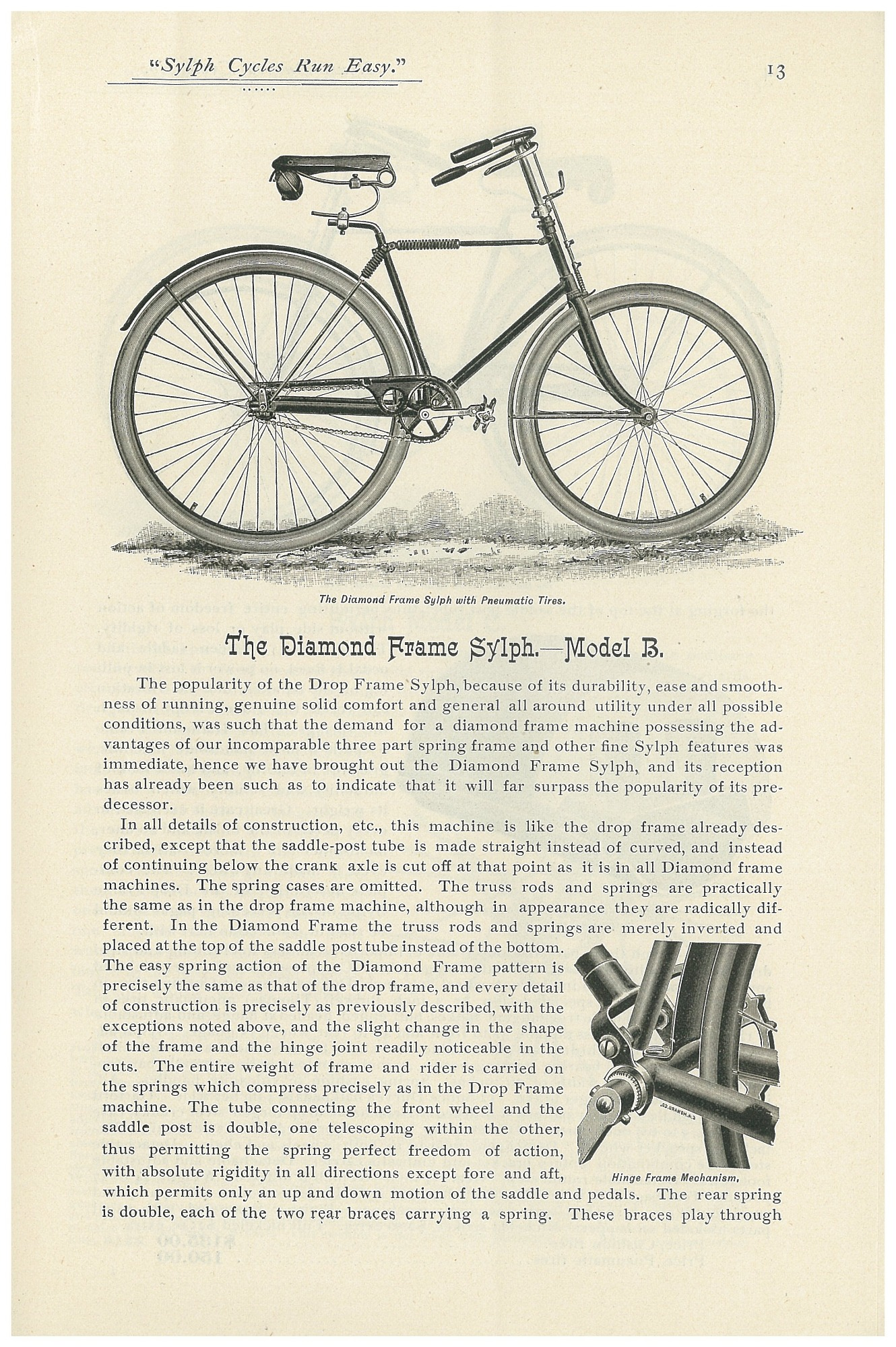
Sylph Model B. Diamond Frame Bicycle Advertisement
