= David Hotchkiss House =

Historic house in Connecticut, United States

- U.S. National Register of Historic Places
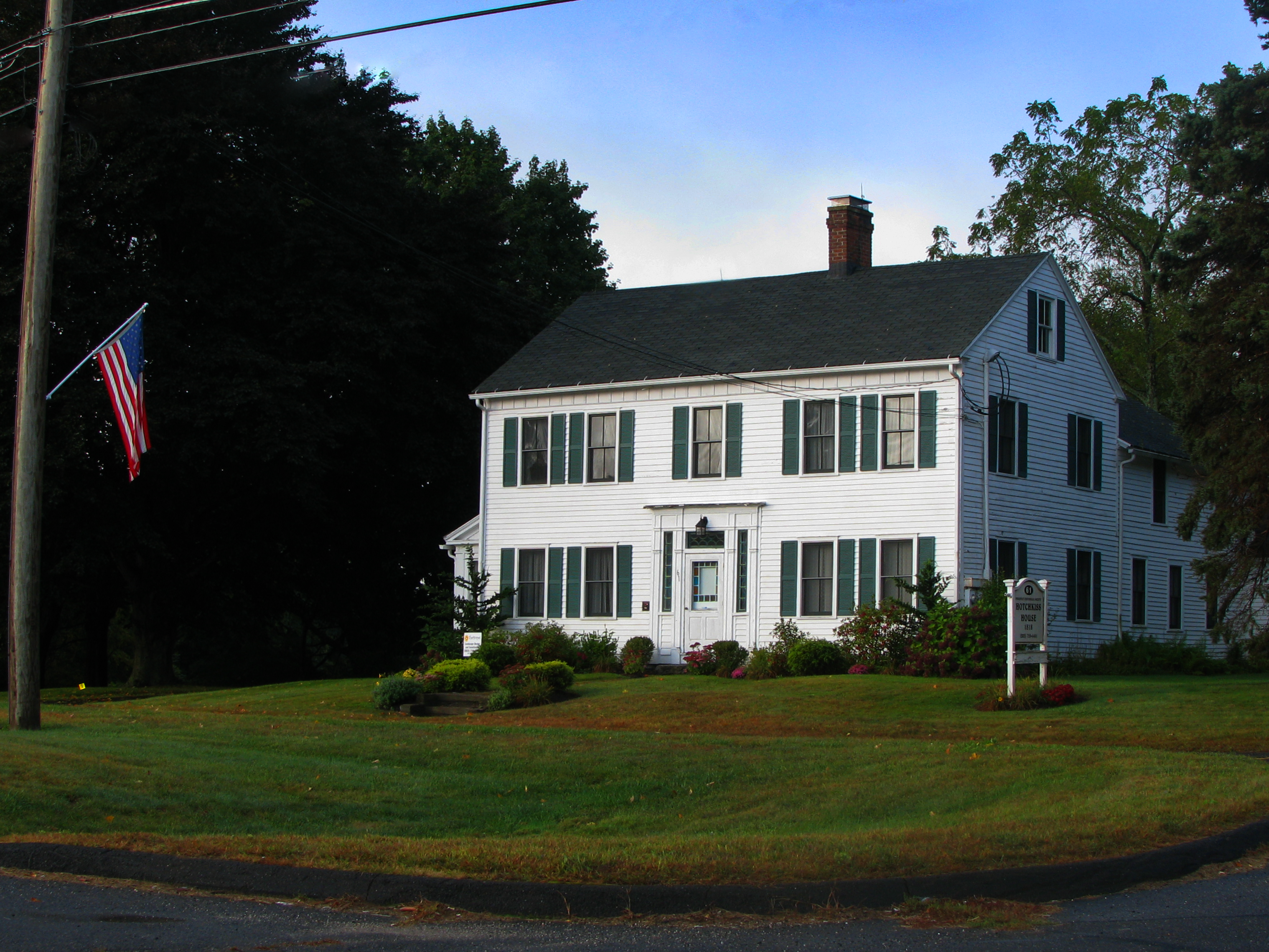

- Location within Connecticut Location within the United States
- Location: 61 Waterbury Road, Prospect, Connecticut
- Coordinates: 41°30′44″N 72°59′05″W
- Area: 2 acres (0.81 ha)
- Built: 1818
- Built by: Root, Enos S.
- Architectural style: Federal, Federal Vernacular
- NRHP reference No.: 81000617
- Added to NRHP: May 1, 1981

The David Hotchkiss House is a historic house museum at 61 Waterbury Road CT 69 in Prospect, Connecticut. Built in 1820, it is a well-preserved example of Federal period architecture. Owned for 160 years by a single family, it has subsequently served as the headquarters of the local historical society. It was listed on the National Register of Historic Places in 1981.

== Description and history ==
The David Hotchkiss House is located in what is now a mainly commercial area northwest of the town center, on the West Side of Waterbury Road (CT 69) North of its Junction with Scott Road. It is a 2 1/2-story wood-frame structure, with a gabled roof, off-center chimney, and clapboarded exterior. Its main facade is five bays wide, with sash windows arranged symmetrically around the main entrance. The entrance is flanked by sidelights that have slender pilasters on either side, and is topped by a corniced entablature. The interior follows a regionally characteristic but unusual center chimney plan, with an elongated rear kitchen that gave the house a T shape at its time of construction. Its front rooms retain fireplace surrounds and paneling despite the removal of the original chimney stack and fireplaces.

The house was built in 1820 by Enos Root for Frederick Hotchkiss, as a present for his son David. The Hotchkisses were a prominent local family who were among its first settlers. They kept extensive records on the construction and maintenance of the house in their 160 years of ownership, which now form part of the Prospect Historical Society's collections. The family sold the house to the town in 1978, and it now serves as the society's headquarters and museum.

== See also ==
- National Register of Historic Places listings in New Haven County, Connecticut
