= Lambert-Parent House =

Historic house in Ohio, United States

- U.S. National Register of Historic Places
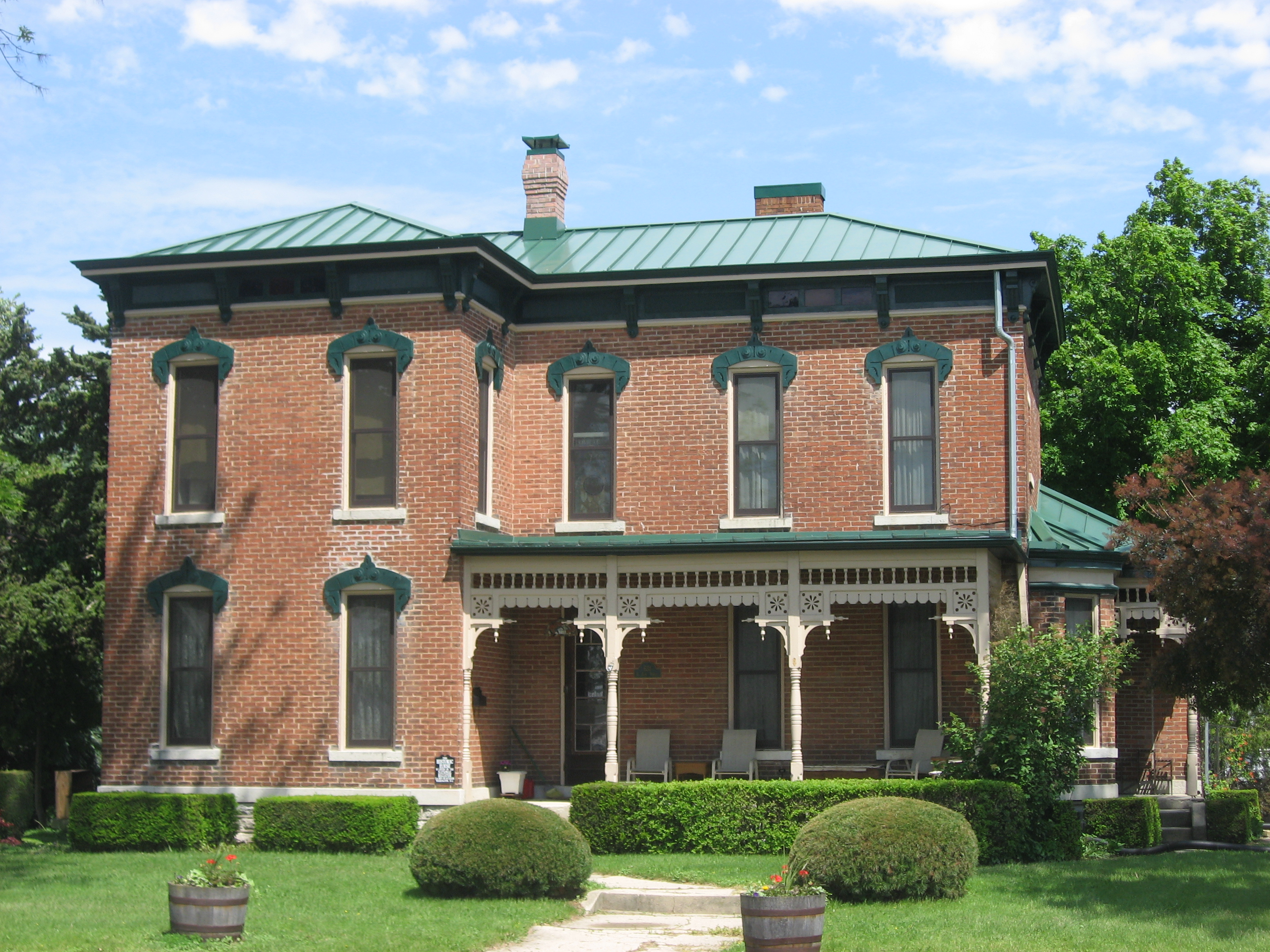
- Front of the house

- Location within Ohio Location within the United States
- Location: 631 E. Elm St., Union City, Ohio
- Coordinates: 40°12′3″N 84°47′57″W
- Area: less than one acre
- Built: 1881
- Architectural style: Italianate
- NRHP reference No.: 80002987
- Added to NRHP: May 23, 1980

The Lambert-Parent House is a historic house in the village of Union City, Ohio, United States. Built in 1881, it was initially the home of George Lambert, who founded multiple major businesses in Union City and participated in the automobile manufacturing firm founded by his brother John. Built of brick on a stone foundation and topped with a slate roof, it is a fine example of the Italianate style of architecture and one of the most prominent structures in Union City. Among its most distinctive architectural elements are its ornate cornices and its tall, narrow windows.

In 1980, the house was listed on the National Register of Historic Places both because of its well-preserved architecture and its connection to George Lambert. The name "Lambert-Parent" is derived from its builder and from the Parent family, who were business associates and his relatives by marriage.
