= Hotchkiss House (Monticello, Arkansas) =

Historic house in Arkansas, United States

- U.S. National Register of Historic Places
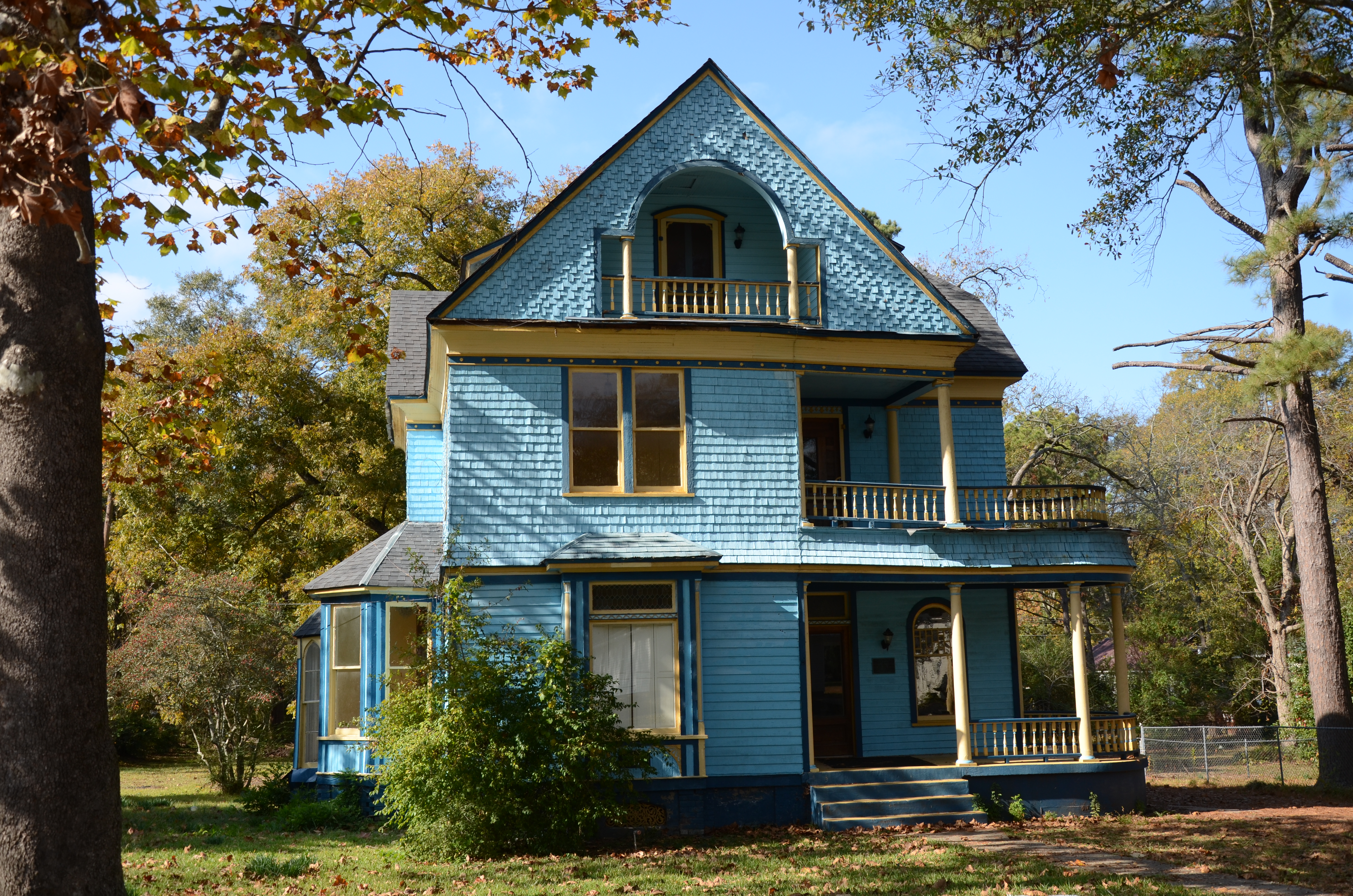

- Location within Arkansas Location within the United States
- Location: 509 N. Boyd St., Monticello, Arkansas
- Coordinates: 33°37′53″N 91°47′39″W
- Area: less than one acre
- Built: 1895
- Architect: Hotchkiss, S.C.
- Architectural style: Eclectic
- NRHP reference No.: 76000404
- Added to NRHP: December 12, 1976

The Hotchkiss House in Monticello, Arkansas was designed by architect Sylvester Hotchkiss and was built in 1895. It was listed on the National Register of Historic Places in 1976.

It is not far from the Allen House, at 705 North Main, Monticello, also designed by Hotchkiss.

Although the National Register application listed 1895 as the year of construction, the house was actually completed in 1903. Hotchkiss did not purchase the land for the house until 1901. As a former owner of the property (from 1989 to 2004) we had the complete chain of title given to us. When the Davis family applied for listing on the National Register they based the year of construction on receipts found in the house for building materials. Since Hotchkiss was a designer and builder, he had receipts for materials from a variety of projects.

== See also ==
- National Register of Historic Places listings in Drew County, Arkansas
