= Union City, Ohio =

- Village
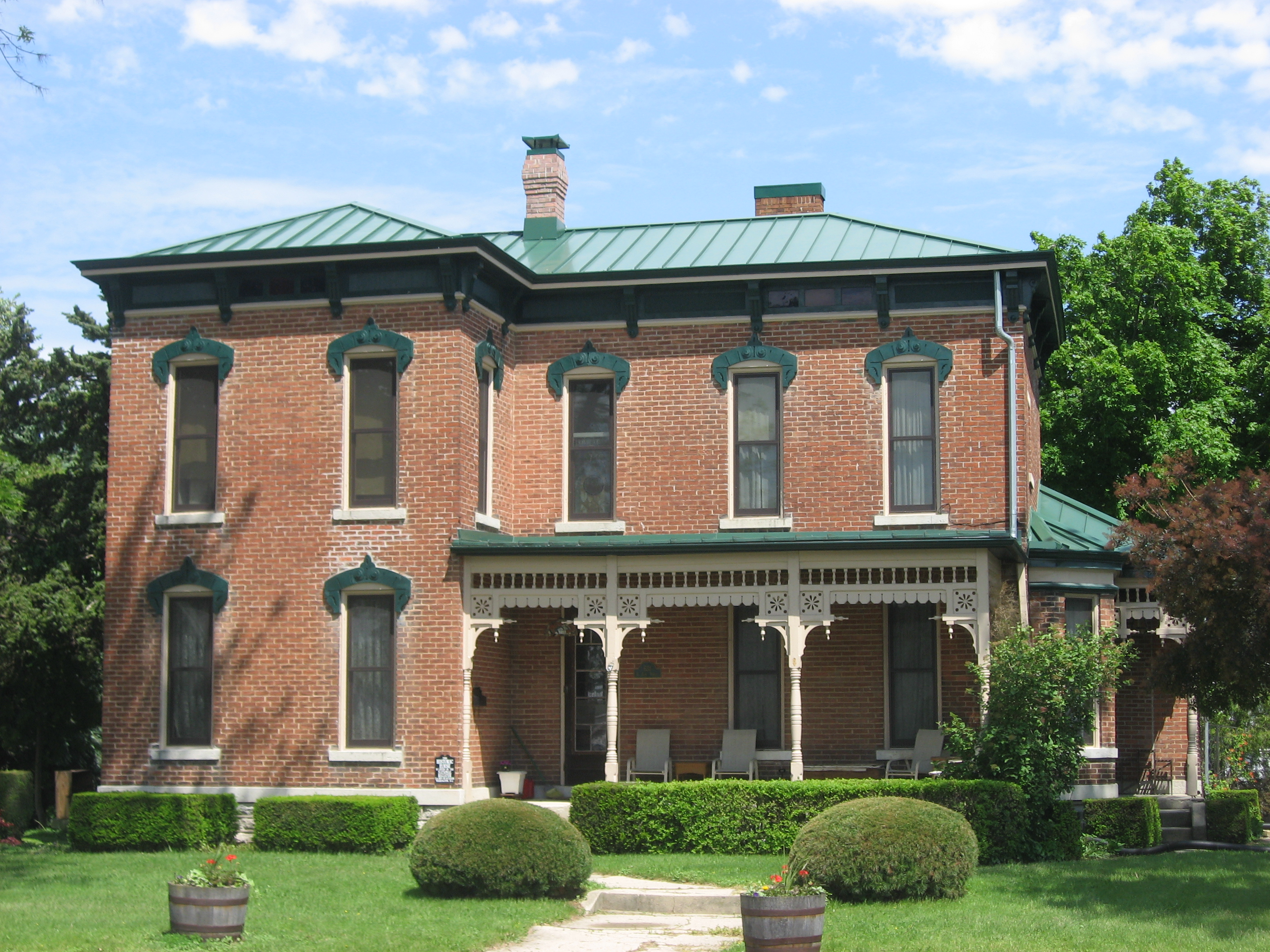
- The Lambert-Parent House, a historic house in the community
- Motto: "The Hub of Two States"
- Location in Darke County and the state of Ohio
- Coordinates: 40°11′59″N 84°47′39″W
- Country: United States
- State: Ohio
- County: Darke
- Township: Jackson

Government
  - Mayor: Duane Pouder

Area
  - Total: 0.97 sq mi (2.50 km^{2})
  - Land: 0.92 sq mi (2.38 km^{2})
  - Water: 0.046 sq mi (0.12 km^{2})
- Elevation: 1,093 ft (333 m)

Population (2020)
  - Total: 1,582
  - Density: 1,723.1/sq mi (665.31/km^{2})
- Time zone: UTC-5 (Eastern (EST))
  - Summer (DST): UTC-4 (EDT)
- ZIP code: 45390
- Area codes: 937, 326
- FIPS code: 39-78624
- GNIS feature ID: 2400022

Union City is a village in Darke County, Ohio, United States. The population was 1,582 at the 2020 census. It is directly across the state line from its twin city of Union City, Indiana.

== History ==
Union City was platted in 1838 and incorporated on December 6, 1853. Incorporation came during a period of growth occasioned by the opening of a line of the Greenville and Miami Railroad through the town on December 12, 1852.

One house in Union City, the Lambert-Parent House, is listed on the National Register of Historic Places.

== Geography ==
According to the United States Census Bureau, the village has a total area of 0.97 square miles (2.51 km^{2}), of which 0.92 square miles (2.38 km^{2}) is land and 0.05 square miles (0.13 km^{2}) is water.

== Demographics ==
Historical population
Census	Pop.	Note	%±
1870	792		—
1880	1,127		42.3%
1890	1,293		14.7%
1900	1,282		−0.9%
1910	1,595		24.4%
1920	1,534		−3.8%
1930	1,305		−14.9%
1940	1,497		14.7%
1950	1,622		8.4%
1960	1,657		2.2%
1970	1,808		9.1%
1980	1,985		9.8%
1990	1,984		−0.1%
2000	1,767		−10.9%
2010	1,666		−5.7%
2020	1,582		−5.0%
U.S. Decennial Census

=== 2010 census ===
As of the census of 2010, there were 1,666 people, 657 households, and 422 families living in the village. The population density was 1,810.9 inhabitants per square mile (699.2/km^{2}). There were 754 housing units at an average density of 819.6 per square mile (316.4/km^{2}). The racial makeup of the village was 93.1% White, 0.9% African American, 0.2% Native American, 0.4% Asian, 2.9% from other races, and 2.5% from two or more races. Hispanic or Latino of any race were 6.1% of the population.

There were 657 households, of which 35.3% had children under the age of 18 living with them, 39.7% were married couples living together, 18.3% had a female householder with no husband present, 6.2% had a male householder with no wife present, and 35.8% were non-families. 31.4% of all households were made up of individuals, and 12.5% had someone living alone who was 65 years of age or older. The average household size was 2.41, and the average family size was 2.97.

The median age in the village was 38.3 years. 26.6% of residents were under the age of 18; 8.9% were between the ages of 18 and 24; 22.5% were from 25 to 44; 26.6% were from 45 to 64, and 15.2% were 65 years of age or older. The gender makeup of the village was 47.4% male and 52.6% female.

=== 2000 census ===
As of the census of 2000, there were 1,767 people, 690 households, and 445 families living in the village. The population density was 1,919.0 inhabitants per square mile (740.9/km^{2}). There were 780 housing units at an average density of 847.1 per square mile (327.1/km^{2}). The racial makeup of the village was 94.91% White, 1.36% African American, 0.40% Native American, 0.17% Asian, 2.15% from other races, and 1.02% from two or more races. Hispanic or Latino of any race were 4.64% of the population.

There were 690 households, out of which 32.8% had children under the age of 18 living with them, 46.1% were married couples living together, 13.9% had a female householder with no husband present, and 35.4% were non-families. 29.0% of all households were made up of individuals, and 14.5% had someone living alone who was 65 years of age or older. The average household size was 2.42, and the average family size was 2.95.

In the village, the population was spread out, with 26.8% under the age of 18, 9.4% from 18 to 24, 26.9% from 25 to 44, 19.6% from 45 to 64, and 17.3% who were 65 years of age or older. The median age was 35 years. For every 100 females, there were 86.2 males. For every 100 females age 18 and over, there were 80.6 males.

The median income for a household in the village was $26,442, and the median income for a family was $30,603. Males had a median income of $28,684 versus $19,211 for females. The per capita income for the village was $14,906. About 18.8% of families and 20.8% of the population were below the poverty line, including 30.4% of those under age 18 and 6.4% of those age 65 or over.

== Media ==
- KISS-TV is a local-access television channel in Union City operated through the K.I.S.S. (Kable Independent Study Seminar) program at Union City High School. The program was established in 1972 and provides students with vocational broadcasting experience, producing programming for local cable and online platforms.
- WJYW 88.9 "Joy FM" broadcasts a Contemporary Christian music format. It is licensed to the neighboring Indiana community of the same name, but has a studio on the Ohio side.
- WTGR 97.5 FM "Tiger Country" is licensed to (and transmits from) the local community with a studio in Greenville.

== Notable people ==
- Garland Anderson - composer and classical pianist
- Curtis Enis - National Football League tailback
- Chris Hawkey - Radio personality and musician
