= John William Lambert =

American automobile manufacturer

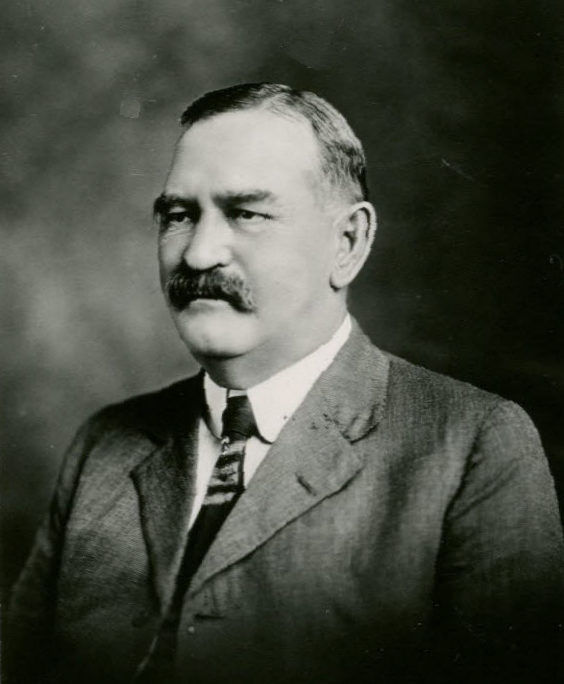
- Born: January 29, 1860; Mechanicsburg, Ohio
- Died: May 20, 1952 (aged 92); Anderson, Indiana
- Resting place: East Maplewood Cemetery
- Occupation: Mechanical Engineer
- Known for: America's First Successful Gasoline Automobile and the Father of the Gradual Transmission
- Spouse(s): Mary (Minnie) F. Kelley married 1885
- Children: Alvin Ray and Ethel Mae
- Parent(s): George Lambert; Anna Lambert parents from Pennsylvania

John William Lambert (January 29, 1860 – May 20, 1952) was an American automobile manufacturer pioneer and inventor. He is the inventor of the first practical American gasoline automobile. In 1891, he built a working gasoline automobile and took it on the streets of Ohio City for experimental drives. He had over 600 patents.

== Innovations and patents ==
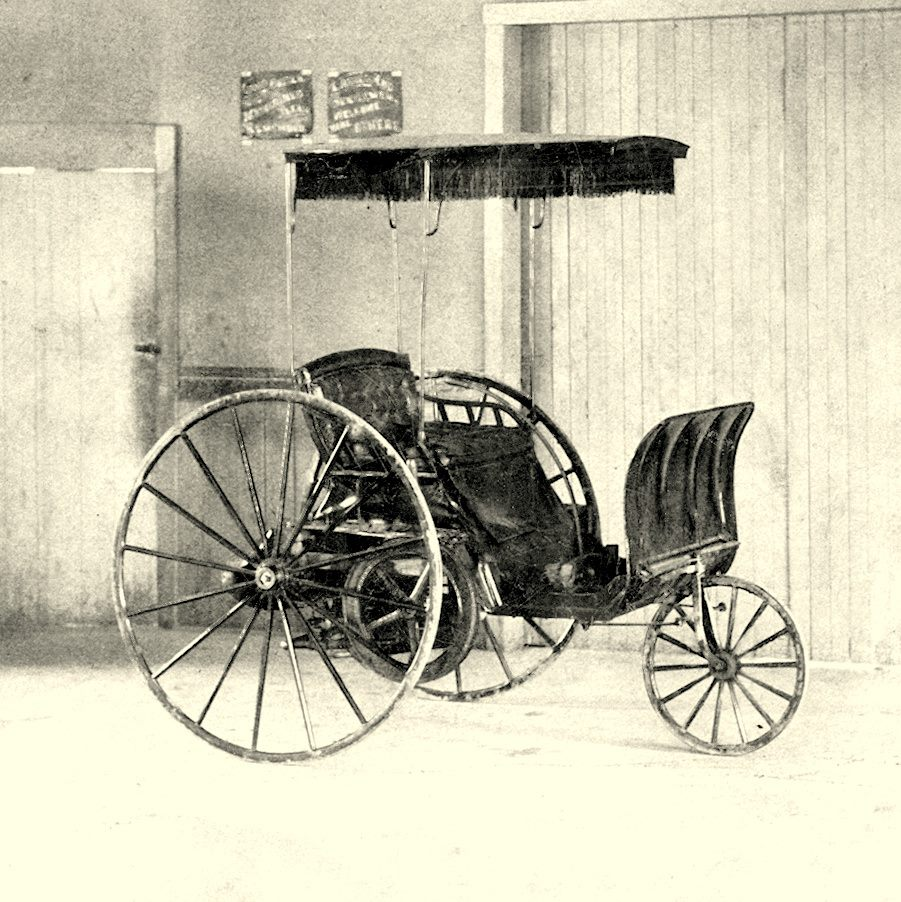
1891: the first workable American gasoline car, made by John W. Lambert

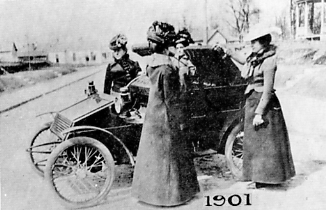
Lambert 1901 experimental automobile

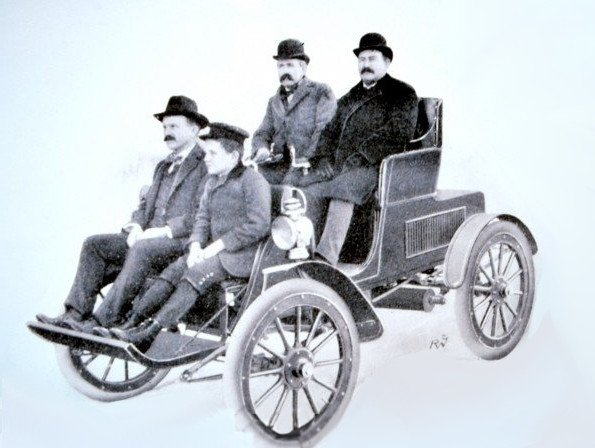
John Lambert and his brothers in 1902 in a Union Automobile

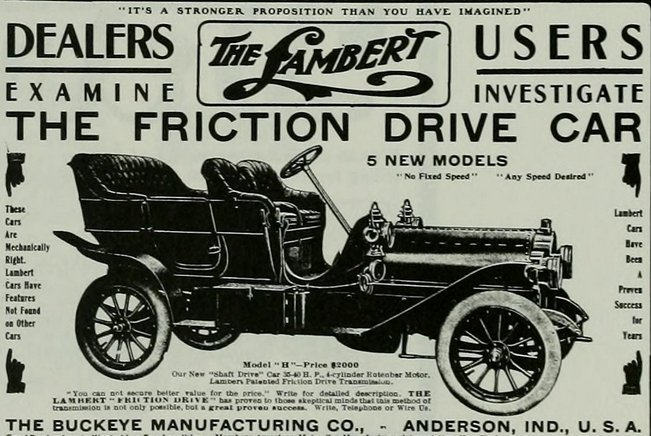
Lambert 1907 automobile advertisement with the friction transmission featured in it.

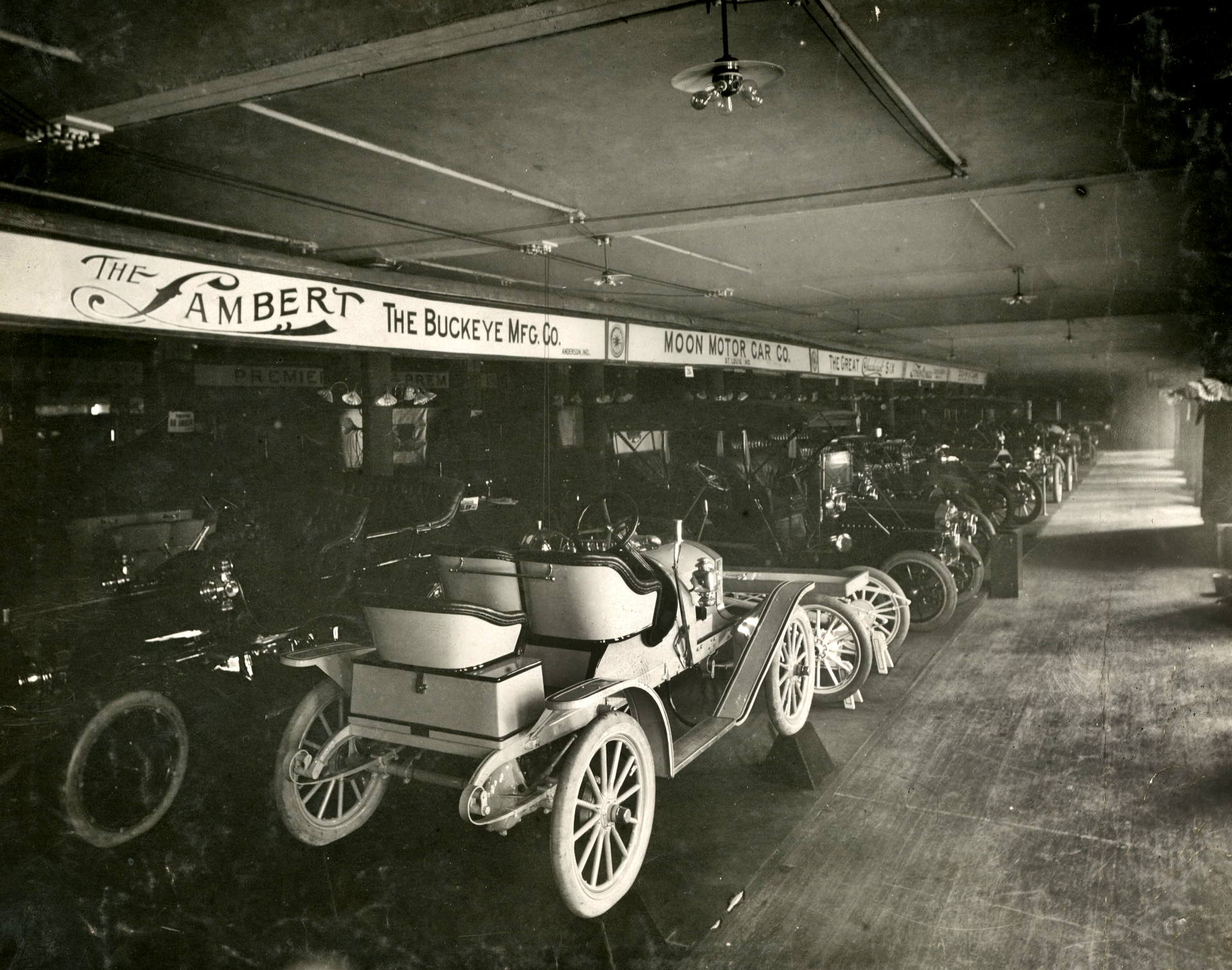
Lambert Automobile Company, 1908

Lambert had more than 600 inventions.

== Later life and legacy ==
Lambert died in Anderson, Indiana, on May 20, 1952.

Lambert Days is celebrated in Ohio City.

== See also ==
- Buckeye Manufacturing Company
- Lambert Automobile Company
- Lambert automobile
- Lambert-Parent House
- Union automobile
