= Fritz W. Alexander II =

American judge

Associate Judge of the New York Court of Appeals
- In office January 2, 1985 – February 6, 1992
- Appointed by: Mario Cuomo
- Preceded by: Hugh R. Jones
- Succeeded by: George Bundy Smith

Deputy Mayor of New York City
- In office 1992–1993
- Appointed by: David Dinkins
- Preceded by: Randy Daniels

Personal details
- Born: Carl Bernard Zanders; April 24, 1926 Apopka, Florida
- Died: April 22, 2000 (aged 73) Manhattan, New York City, New York
- Party: Democratic

Fritz Winfred Alexander II (born Carl Bernard Zanders Jr., April 24, 1926 – April 22, 2000) was an American judge who served as an Associate Judge of the New York Court of Appeals from 1985 to 1992, and a deputy mayor of New York from 1992 to 1993. Alexander was the first black judge to serve a full term on the Court of Appeals. Fritz Alexander was a part of the Harlem Clubhouse headed by J. Raymond Jones

He died of cancer on April 22, 2000, in Manhattan at age 73.

== See also ==
- Harlem Clubhouse
