= Jack T. Conway =

American labor unionist

Jack Conway

Administrator of the Housing and Home Finance Agency
- Acting
- In office January 20, 1961 – February 11, 1961
- President: John F. Kennedy
- Preceded by: Albert M. Cole
- Succeeded by: Robert C. Weaver

Personal details
- Born: 1918 Detroit, Michigan, U.S.
- Died: January 6, 1998 (aged 80) Sarasota, Florida, U.S.
- Party: Democratic
- Education: University of Chicago (BA); University of Washington (attended)

Jack T. Conway (1918 – January 6, 1998) was an American labor unionist. He left his job as a labor leader for the AFL-CIO to run the Community Action Program in 1965. The program was an initiative of President Lyndon B. Johnson's administration established to give grants to over 250 communities around the US as part of Johnson's War on Poverty program. As the director Conway arranged financing for the Job Corps and Head Start programs. He later resigned over political battles between congressional liberals and conservatives over the programs.

== Early life and education ==
Conway was born and grew up in Detroit and received a BA in sociology from the University of Chicago. He was the assistant director of the radio department at the University of Chicago, and did graduate work in sociology at the University of Washington in Seattle, and taught sociology there.

== United Auto Workers organizing ==
He first became active in the labor movement in the 1940s while working for a Buick aircraft engine plant near Chicago. He helped to organize workers for the United Automobile Workers and was the chairman of the union's bargaining committee. He was a UAW representative from 1946 to 1961, and became an administrative assistant to union president Walter Reuther.

== Kennedy administration work ==
Conway first came to Washington DC in 1960 during the administration of John F. Kennedy as the deputy administrator of the Housing and Home Finance Agency. He helped write the Omnibus Housing Act of 1961 which created the Department of Housing and Urban Development.

== Work for the Democratic party ==
In 1968 Conway was chairman of the national committee of Americans for Democratic Action, at a time when the organization was in a heated debate whether to support Johnson or Eugene J. McCarthy as the Democratic presidential candidate.

== Robert Kennedy, Cesar Chavez and Ted Watkins ==
Conway enlisted the help of Robert Kennedy to aid the migrant farm workers under Cesar Chavez and to support Ted Watkins and his Watts Labor Community Action Committee.

He was a trustee of Urban America Inc., a Washington-based non-profit organization that worked to improve physical and social conditions in urban areas.

== President of Common Cause ==
He was the first president of Common Cause from 1970 to 1975, a group that opposed the Vietnam War and lobbied for campaign finance reform. He was the executive director of the American Federation of State, County and Municipal Employees and then was the senior vice president of the United Way of America.

He moved to Sarasota, Florida in 1982, still active in politics. He made an unsuccessful bid for the House of Representatives in Florida's 13th Congressional District in 1988. At this time he worked as an unpaid chief executive of the Community Housing Corp which built houses for low-income families in Florida.

Conway died at his home in Sarasota, Florida, at the age of 80 on January 6, 1998 from respiratory failure. He was married and had three children, five grandchildren and one great-grandchild at the time of his death.

Political offices
Preceded by Albert M. Cole	Administrator of the Housing and Home Finance Agency; Acting; 1961	Succeeded by Robert C. Weaver
