= Edward Richard Dudley =

American lawyer, judge, civil rights activist and diplomat (1911-2005)

Edward R. Dudley

Borough President of Manhattan
- In office January 31, 1961 – January 4, 1965
- Preceded by: Hulan E. Jack
- Succeeded by: Constance Baker Motley

United States Ambassador to Liberia
- In office May 6, 1949 – June 15, 1953
- President: Harry Truman; Dwight Eisenhower
- Preceded by: Himself (as Minister)
- Succeeded by: Jesse D. Locker

United States Minister to Liberia
- In office October 18, 1948 – March 2, 1949
- President: Harry Truman
- Preceded by: Raphael O'Hara Lanier
- Succeeded by: Himself (as Ambassador)

Personal details
- Born: Edward Richard Dudley; March 11, 1911 South Boston, Virginia, U.S.
- Died: February 8, 2005 (aged 93) New York, New York, U.S.
- Party: Democratic
- Spouse: Rae Oley
- Children: 1
- Education: Johnson C. Smith University (B.S.); Howard University; St. John's University School of Law (LL.B.)

Edward Richard Dudley (March 11, 1911 – February 8, 2005) was an American lawyer, judge, civil rights activist and the first African American to hold the rank of Ambassador of the United States, as ambassador to Liberia from 1949 to 1953.

== Life and career ==
Dudley was born on March 11, 1911, in South Boston, Virginia, to Edward Richard and Nellie (nee Johnson) Dudley. He graduated with a bachelor of science degree from Johnson C. Smith College in 1932 where he became a member of Alpha Phi Alpha fraternity, and then taught school in Gainsboro, Virginia. He studied dentistry for a year on a scholarship at Howard University, and then moved to New York City.

In New York, Dudley worked in odd jobs including stage manager for Orson Welles at a public works theater project. In 1938, he enrolled at St. John's University School of Law, graduating with an LL.B. in 1941. For a brief period he practiced law, entered Democratic politics in Harlem, and was an assistant New York State attorney general in 1942. This position ended when Thomas E. Dewey was elected governor. In 1942, he married Rae Oley. They had a son, Edward R. Dudley III.

=== N.A.A.C.P. and ambassadorship ===
In 1943, he joined the N.A.A.C.P. legal team with the encouragement from Thurgood Marshall. As an assistant special counsel, he wrote briefs and prepared cases seeking the admission of black students to Southern colleges, equal pay for black teachers and an end to discrimination in public transportation. He was executive assistant to the governor of the Virgin Islands from 1945 to 1947 while still in his position at the N.A.A.C.P.

In 1948, Dudley was appointed by President Harry S. Truman as minister to Liberia. This position was one of the few that African Americans were sent to. At this time, virtually all Black employees of the State Department were sent to and revolved through certain hardship posts derisively called the "Negro Circuit." These positions were always in majority Black areas like Monrovia, Ponta Delgada, and Madagascar. The mission in Monrovia was elevated to an embassy in 1949, making Dudley the first Black ambassador.

In May 1949, Dudley and his staff put together a memorandum which documented the statistics related to African Americans in the State Department, compared to white employees in similar positions. They found that white employees had been transferred more times and to fewer hardship positions. After a meeting with Undersecretary of State, Dean Acheson, Black employees began to be transferred out of Africa.

=== Later career ===
Returning home in 1953, he practiced law and directed the N.A.A.C.P.'s Freedom Fund. In 1955, New York City's mayor, Robert F. Wagner, Jr., appointed him as justice of the Domestic Relations Court.

Dudley was the borough president of Manhattan from 1961 to 1964. In the New York state election of 1962, he was the Democratic and Liberal candidate for attorney general but was defeated by the Republican incumbent, Louis Lefkowitz. He was a delegate to the 1964 Democratic National Convention. J. Raymond Jones was influential in helping Dudley in New York politics.

In November 1964, Dudley was elected as a justice of the New York State Supreme Court for the First Judicial District (Manhattan and the Bronx), a post he held from 1965 until his retirement in 1985.

== Death ==
Dudley died of prostate cancer in St. Luke's Hospital in Manhattan on February 8, 2005, aged 93. He was survived by his widow, their son, two brothers (Dr. Calmeze Dudley and Dr. Hubert Dudley) and three grandchildren (Kevin, Kyle and Alexandra Dudley).

The Dudley family summered in the SANS community, buying their lot during the 1950s expansion into Sag Harbor Hills. The community is a historically upper- and middle-class Black neighborhood. The Dudley family still lived in the cottage in 2023.

In 2022, Dudley was featured in The American Diplomat, a PBS documentary that explores the lives and legacies of three African-American ambassadors during the Cold War.

== See also ==
- Harlem Clubhouse
- African Americans in foreign policy

Diplomatic posts
Preceded by Raphael Lanier	United States Minister to Liberia; 1948–1949	Succeeded by Himself as Ambassador to Liberia
Preceded by Himself as Minister to Liberia	United States Ambassador to Liberia; 1949–1953	Succeeded by Jesse D. Locker
Party political offices
Preceded by Hulan E. Jack	Borough President of Manhattan; 1961–1964	Succeeded by Constance Baker Motley
Preceded by Peter J. Crotty	Democratic Nominee for New York State Attorney General; 1962	Succeeded by Frank Sedita
