= Robert C. Weaver =

American government official (1907–1997)

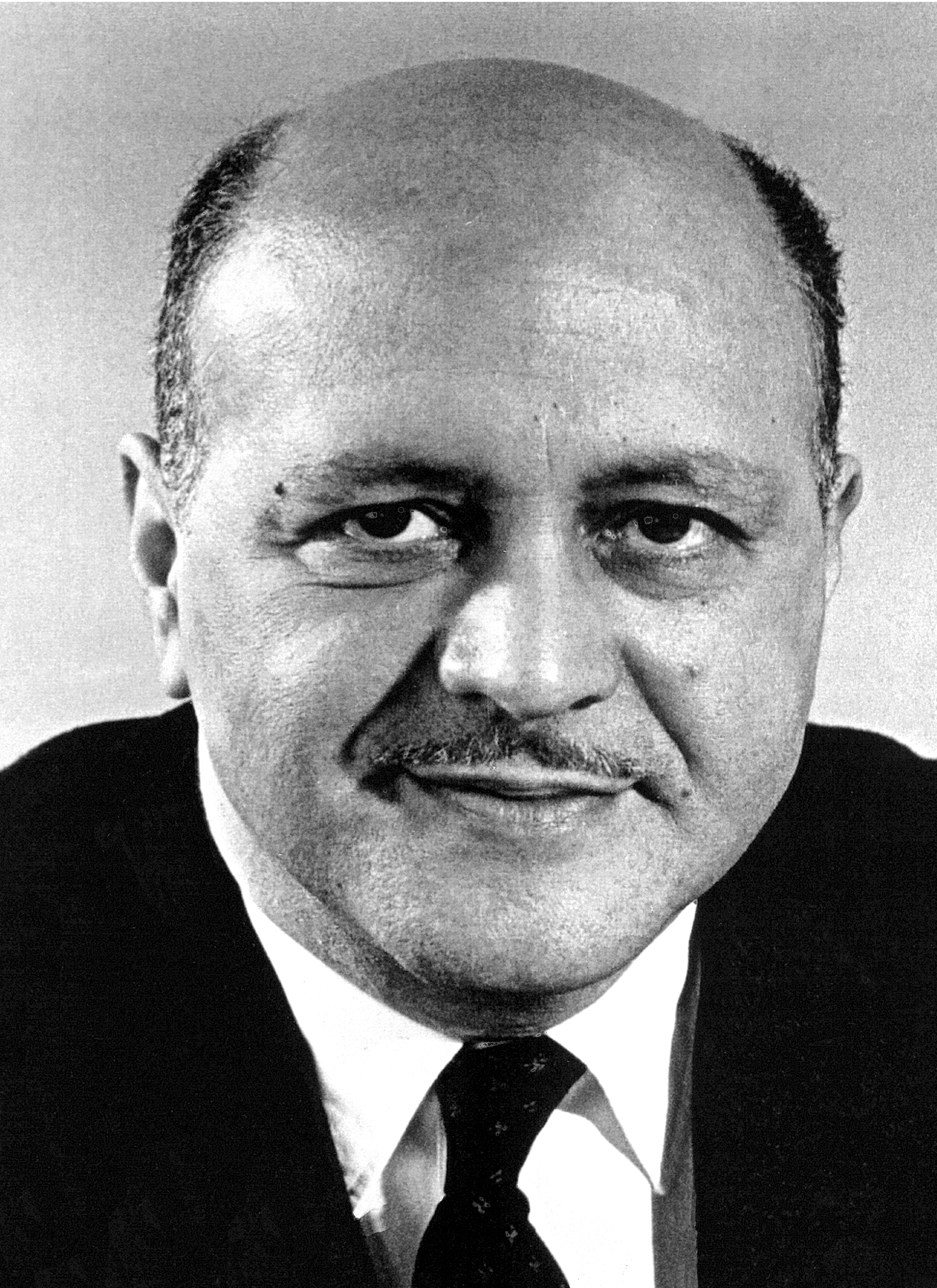

1st United States Secretary of Housing and Urban Development
- In office January 18, 1966 – December 18, 1968
- President: Lyndon B. Johnson
- Preceded by: Himself (HHFA Administrator)
- Succeeded by: Robert Coldwell Wood

Administrator of the Housing and Home Finance Agency
- In office February 11, 1961 – January 18, 1966
- President: John F. Kennedy; Lyndon B. Johnson
- Preceded by: Jack T. Conway (acting)
- Succeeded by: Himself (HUD Secretary)

Chair of the National Association for the Advancement of Colored People
- In office 1960–1961
- Preceded by: Channing Heggie Tobias
- Succeeded by: Stephen Gill Spottswood

Personal details
- Born: Robert Clifton Weaver; December 29, 1907 Washington, D.C., U.S.
- Died: July 17, 1997 (aged 89) New York City, U.S.
- Party: Democratic
- Spouse: Ella Haith (m. 1935; died 1991)
- Education: Harvard University (BS, MA, PhD)

Robert Clifton Weaver (December 29, 1907 – July 17, 1997) was an American economist, academic, and political administrator who served as the first United States Secretary of Housing and Urban Development from 1966 to 1968, when the department was newly established by President Lyndon B. Johnson. Weaver was the first African American to be appointed to a US Cabinet-level position.

Prior to his appointment as cabinet officer, Weaver had served in the administration of President John F. Kennedy. In addition, he had served in New York State government, and in high-level positions in New York City. During the Franklin D. Roosevelt administration, he was one of 45 prominent African Americans appointed to positions and helped make up the Black Cabinet, an informal group of African American public policy advisers. Weaver directed federal programs during the administration of the New Deal, at the same time completing his doctorate in economics in 1934 at Harvard University.

== Background ==
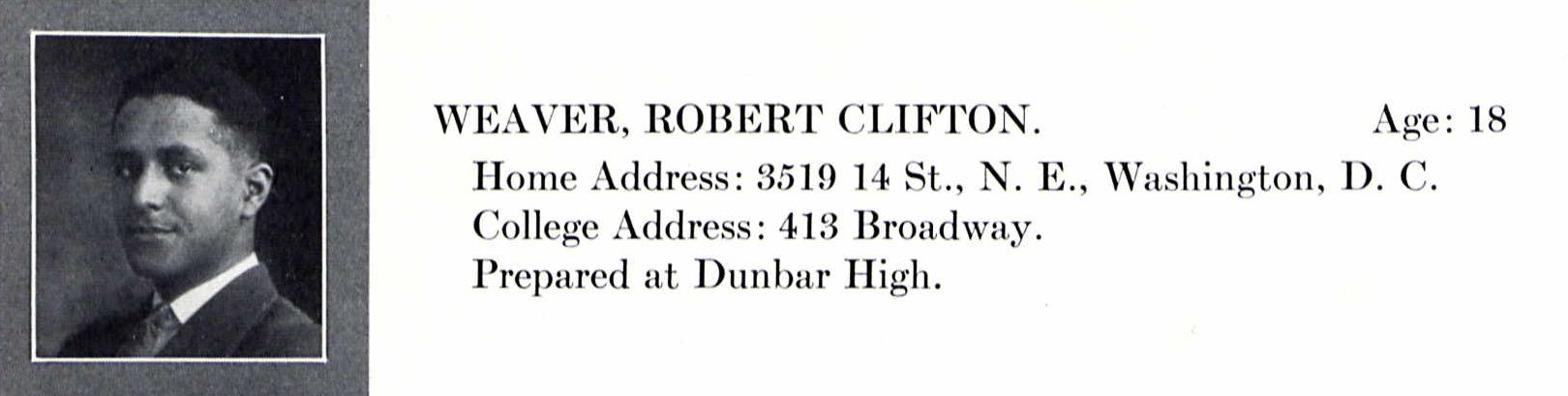
Weaver in the Harvard University yearbook, 1929

Robert Clifton Weaver was born on December 29, 1907, into a middle-class family in Washington, D.C. His parents were Mortimer Grover Weaver, a postal worker, and Florence (Freeman) Weaver. They encouraged him in his academic studies. His maternal grandfather was Dr. Robert Tanner Freeman, the first African American to graduate from Harvard in dentistry.

The young Weaver attended the M Street High School, now known as the Dunbar High School. The high school for Blacks at a time of racial segregation had a national reputation for academic excellence. Weaver went on to Harvard University, where he earned a Bachelor of Science and Master of Arts degree. He also earned a Doctor of Philosophy degree in Economics, completing his doctorate in 1934.

== Career ==
=== Government ===
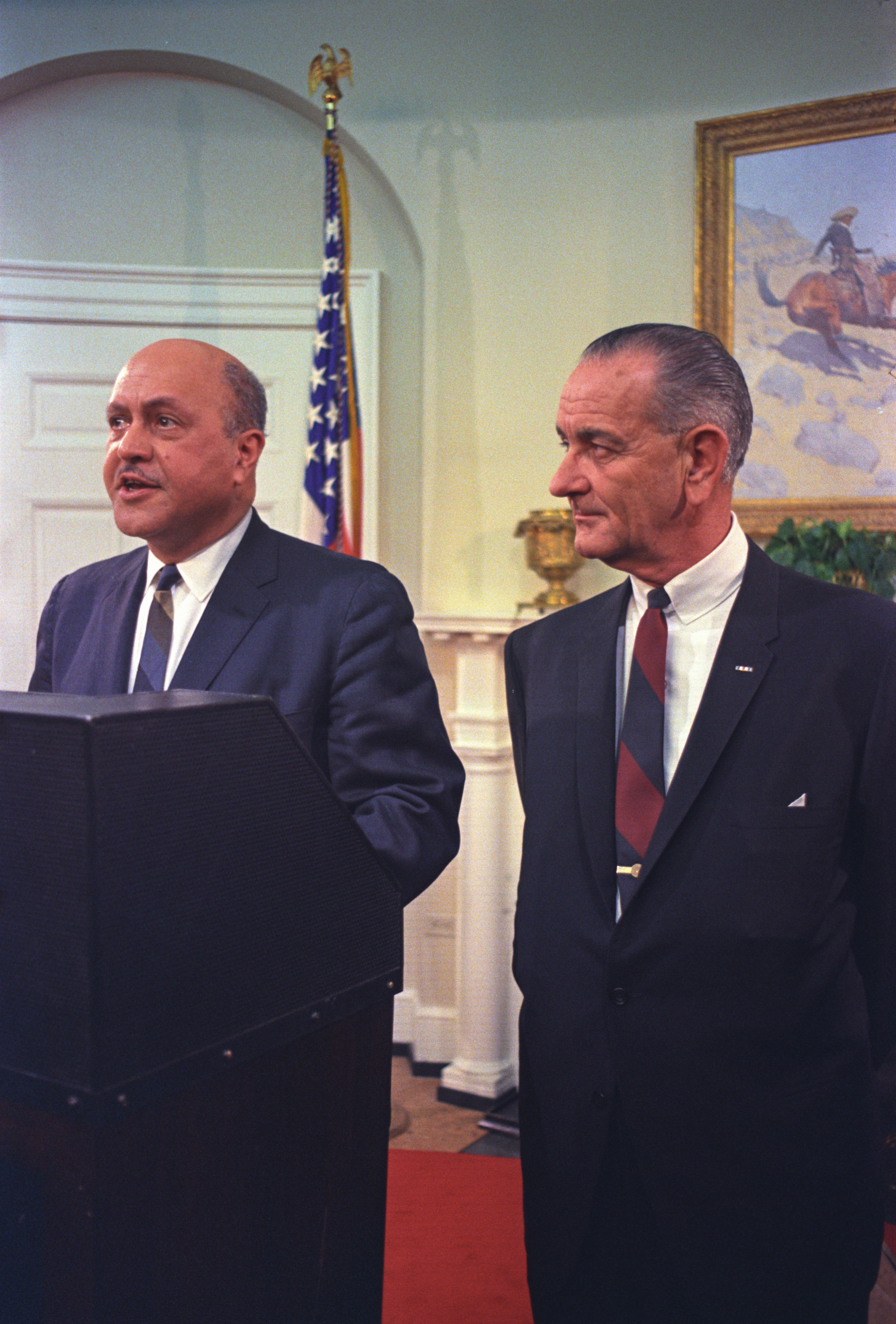
Weaver with Lyndon Johnson at the White House for his swearing-in ceremony (1966)

==== Washington ====
In 1934, Weaver was appointed as an aide to United States Secretary of the Interior Harold L. Ickes. In 1938, he became special assistant to the US Housing Authority. In 1942, he became administrative assistant to the National Defense Advisory Commission, the War Manpower Commission (1942), and director of Negro Manpower Service.

With a reputation for knowledge about housing issues, in 1934 the young Weaver was invited to join President Franklin D. Roosevelt's Black Cabinet. Roosevelt appointed a total of 45 prominent blacks to positions in executive agencies, and called on them as informal advisers on public policy issues related to African Americans, the Great Depression and the New Deal.

Weaver drafted the US Housing Program under Roosevelt, which was established in 1937. The program was intended to provide financial support to local housing departments, as a subsidy toward lowering the rent poor African Americans had to pay. The program decreased the average rent from $19.47 per month to $16.80 per month. Weaver claimed the scope of this program was insufficient, as there were still many African Americans who made less than the average income. They could not afford to pay for both food and housing. In addition, generally restricted to segregated housing, African Americans could not necessarily take advantage of other subsidized housing.

==== Chicago ====
In 1944, Weaver became director of the Commission on Race Relations in the Office of the Mayor of Chicago. In 1945, he became director of community services for the Chicago-based American Council on Race Relations through 1948.

==== New York ====
In 1949, Weaver become director of fellowship opportunities for the John Hay Whitney Foundation. In 1955, Weaver the first Black State Cabinet member in New York when he became New York State Rent Commissioner under Governor W. Averell Harriman. In 1960, he became vice chairman of the New York City Housing and Redevelopment Board.

==== Washington: HUD ====
In 1961, Weaver became administrator of the United States Housing and Home Financing Agency (HHFA).

After election, Kennedy tried to establish a new cabinet department to deal with urban issues. It was to be called the Department of Housing and Urban Development. Postwar suburban development, following the construction of highways, and economic restructuring had drawn population and jobs from the cities. The nation was faced with a stock of substandard, aged housing in many cities, and problems of unemployment.

In 1961, while trying to create HUD, Kennedy had done everything short of promising the new position to Weaver. He appointed him Administrator of the Housing and Home Finance Agency (HHFA), a group of agencies which Kennedy wanted to raise to cabinet status.

When Dr. Weaver joined the Kennedy Administration, whose Harvard connections extended to the occupant of the Oval Office, he held more Harvard degrees – three, including a doctorate in economics – than anyone else in the administration's upper ranks.

Some Republicans and southern Democrats opposed the legislation to create the new department. The following year, Kennedy unsuccessfully tried to use his reorganization authority to create the department. As a result, Congress passed legislation prohibiting presidents from using that authority to create a new cabinet department, although the previous Republican Dwight D. Eisenhower administration had created the cabinet-level US Department of Health, Education, and Welfare under that authority.

He contributed the compilation housing bill in 1961. He took part in lobbying for the Senior Citizens Housing Act of 1962.

In 1965, Congress approved the department. At the time, Weaver was still Administrator of the HHFA. In public, President Lyndon B. Johnson reiterated Weaver's status as a potential nominee but would not promise him the position. In private, Johnson had strong reservations. He often held pro-and-con discussions with Roy Wilkins, executive director of the NAACP.

Johnson wanted a strong proponent for the new department. Johnson worried about Weaver's political sense. Johnson seriously considered other candidates, none of whom was black. He wanted a top administrator, but also someone who was exciting. Johnson was worried about how the new Secretary would interact with congressional representatives from the Solid South; they were overwhelmingly Democrat as most African Americans were still disenfranchised and excluded from the political system. This was expected to change as the federal government enforced civil rights and the provisions of the Voting Rights Act of 1965. As candidates, Johnson considered the politician Richard Daley, mayor of Chicago; and the philanthropist Laurance Rockefeller.

Ultimately, Johnson believed that Weaver was the best-qualified administrator. His assistant Bill Moyers had rated Weaver highly on potential effectiveness as the new secretary. Moyers noted Weaver's strong accomplishments and ability to create teams. Ten days after receiving the report, the president put forward the nomination, and Weaver was successfully confirmed by the United States Senate.

Weaver served as Secretary of United States Department of Housing and Urban Development from 1966 to 1968.

Weaver had expressed his concerns about African Americans' housing issue before 1930 in his article, "Negroes Need Housing", published by the magazine The Crisis of the NAACP after the Stock Market Crash. He noted there was a great difference between the income of most African Americans and the cost of living; African Americans did not have enough housing supply because of many social factors, including the long economic decline of rural areas in the South. He suggested a government housing program to enable all the African Americans the chance to buy or rent their house.

=== Academia ===
In 1945, Weaver began teaching at Columbia University.

In 1969, after serving under President Johnson, Weaver became president of Baruch College.

In 1970, Weaver became a distinguished professor of Urban Affairs at Hunter College in New York and taught there until 1978.

== Personal life and death ==
In 1935, Robert C. Weaver married Ella V. Haith. They adopted a son, who died in 1962.

Weaver served on the boards of Metropolitan Life Insurance Company (1969–1978) and Bowery Savings Bank (1969–1980). He served in advisory capacities to the United States Controller General (1973–1997), the New City Conciliation and Appeals Board (1973–1984), Harvard University School of Design (1978–1983), the National Association for the Advancement of Colored People (NAACP) Legal Defense Fund and NAACP executive board committee (1978–1997).

Robert C. Weaver died at age 89 on July 17, 1997, in Manhattan, New York.

== Honors ==
Weaver received more than 30 honorary university degrees, as well as the following:

- 1962: NAACP Spingarn Medal
- 1963: Russworm Award
- 1968:
  - Albert Einstein Commemorative Award
  - Merrick Moore Spaulding Award
- 1975: Public Service Award of the US General Accounting Office
- 1977: Frederick Douglass Award of the New York City Urban League
- 1978: Schomberg Collection Award
- 1985: Fellow, American Academy of Arts and Sciences
- 1987: Equal Opportunity Day Award of the National Urban League

== Legacy ==
- 2000: Robert C. Weaver Federal Building HUD headquarters (which Weaver had dedicated in 1968)
- 2006: "Robert Clifton Weaver Way" NE in Washington, DC
- Undated: "Robert Weaver Avenue" "Robert Weaver Circle" in Austin, Texas

== Works ==
Weaver wrote a number of books regarding black issues and urban housing, including:

- Negro Labor: A National Problem (1946)
- The Negro Ghetto (1948)
- The Urban Complex: Human Values in Urban Life (1964)
- Dilemmas of Urban America (1965)

Herbert Aptheker reviewed The Negro Ghetto in the August 1948 issue of Masses and Mainstream (successor to the New Masses magazine).

== See also ==
- List of African-American United States Cabinet members
- J. Raymond Jones
- Harlem Clubhouse

Political offices
| Preceded by Jack T. Conway; Acting | Administrator of the Housing and Home Finance Agency; 1961–1966 | Succeeded by Himself as United States Secretary of Housing and Urban Development |
| Preceded by Himself as Administrator of the Housing and Home Finance Agency | United States Secretary of Housing and Urban Development; 1966–1968 | Succeeded by Robert Wood |
