= Raphael Lanier =

American diplomat (1900–1962)

Raphael O'Hara Lanier (April 28, 1900 – December 17, 1962) was an American diplomat to Liberia.

Lanier was a member of Alpha Phi Alpha fraternity, the first inter-collegiate Greek letter organization established for African Americans.

Lanier was the first president of what is today Texas Southern University.

Preceded by Lester A. Walton	U.S. Ambassador to Liberia; 1946–1948	Succeeded by Edward R. Dudley
