= Fairview Enterprise =

The Fairview Enterprise
- Type: Weekly newspaper
- Format: Six-column, 8-page paper (originally)
- Owner: Col S. O. Grosbeck
- Editor: Col S. O. Grosbeck
- Founded: March 24, 1888
- Language: English
- Headquarters: Fairview, Kansas, U.S.

The Fairview Enterprise is a newspaper based in Fairview, Kansas. It was established in 1888.

== History ==
The Fairview Enterprise of Fairview, Kansas, was first printed on March 24, 1888. Col S. O. Grosbeck, formerly of Valley Falls, Kansas, was the owner and editor.

The first edition was a six column, eight page paper and four pages of ready print. When he started the Enterprise, he was not certain it would succeed so he did not invest his money in printing equipment. Instead the paper was printed for several years in Horton, Kansas. The first Enterprise office was just an editorial office and was part of Dr. Young’s office on Main Street. In August 1889 the office moved into another building on Main Street, opposite the Fairview Hotel, which allowed enough room for the growth of the paper. This office was large enough that there was space for the City Council and the Police headquarters to locate in the same office in 1890. It was with the March 14, 1891, issue that The Enterprise was printed in Fairview. Competition for The Enterprise was The Courier from 1893 to 1899. The Courier was published and edited by Charles Calnon. The Courier office burned in 1899 and the paper did not restart.

In the beginning a year’s subscription was only $1 and for an additional 65 cents you could also get the Topeka paper for a year. Other publications were also used in trying to get more citizens to subscribe such as Toledo Weekly Blade, Deomonest’s Family Magazine and Cosmopolitan Magazine.

At the time The Enterprise was started Fairview was two years old. The railroad was complete and furnishing incoming and outgoing business for the rapidly developing town. W. E. Moore was mayor; G. O. Grosbeck, Police judge; Thomas Gillan, Willis Scouten, J. F. Joss, W. C. Meyers and Dell McCarthy were councilmen. The town had a hotel, furniture store, dry goods store, hardware, elevator, coal yard, implements, Harness and saddlers business, two grocery stores, post office, meat market, barber shop, etc. and the town had a doctor.

In 1908 or 1909 Grosbeck sold the paper to Truman Williams. In 1911 J. R. Leonard became owner and in 1913 the paper changed hands three times—F. W. McKinnie, Drew McLaughlin and Clarence Unkefer were editors. In 1914 Charles Buck became owner and he built a building just south of the hotel for the paper office. Later it became the library, and in later years the building was moved away. Mr. Buck edited the paper until 1915 when North Worrell became owner. He was editor, owner and publisher until 1920 when he sold to Charles Ross. He kept it until 1923 when an elderly couple, Mr. and Mrs. L. A, McNeil bought it. Up to their ownership, type was set by hand. Some type setters were Charley Barnes, who was blind, and Wesley Marker, dwarf son of Ben Marker. The McNeil’s purchased the first linotype in 1927. Harold Parman was a young school teacher here and was interested in the machine, so he learned to operate it, and in 1928 he purchased the paper, and he and his wife, Helen Sawyer Parman, published it together until his death in June 1935. Mrs. Parman continued as owner and publisher until she leased the paper to Leaine Fanning in 1939, and she married Merle Fish and moved to a farm near Powhattan. Leaine bought the paper in 1945. She had been employed on the paper since September in 1935. The third linotype was purchased in time and the press was replaced by the press in use when the paper ceased publication in February 1987 because of illness of the editor. The paper resumed printing in February 1988 with a brand new method of printing—a computer, laserprinter and a copier. Leaine Fanning continued publishing the paper until her death on May 9, 1994. Leaine’s sister Louise Fanning stepped in and became editor and publisher of the paper. Louise printed the paper until her death on February 8, 2009, at which time the paper was taken over by a cousin Patsy (Schmitt) Weaver and her husband Rolland. Rolland died February 14, 2011, and Patsy on November 7, 2014, at which time the paper ceased being printed.

The paper had been published in the same building since 1931 on Commercial Street, until the death of Louise in 2009, when the building was sold and the paper relocated, at which time the old linotype equipment was donated to a local museum.

A rebirth of The Fairview Enterprise happened in March 2015 when David Floyd Lambertson of Winchester, KS and Larry Gilbert of Kansas City, KS, both having grown up in Fairview, came together to keep the paper alive. Not living in the town, they rely on local volunteers to report the current events to them. They then layout the paper with the help of David's wife, Sacie (Hooper) Lambertson. The paper is then emailed to a printer, who prints the paper on newsprint and delivers it to them, and they in turn take it to the post office and have it mailed out to their subscribers. Subscribers are located from coast to coast. The paper, once a weekly publication is now printed every other week.
