= Richard Lee Jones =

American diplomat (1893–1975)

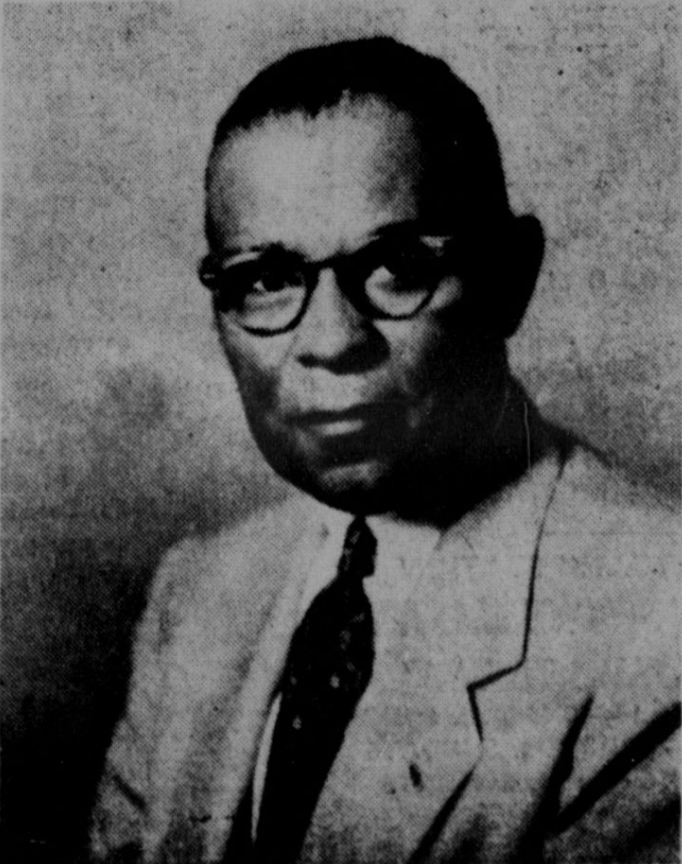

United States Ambassador to Liberia
- In office June 24, 1955 – July 24, 1959
- President: Dwight D. Eisenhower
- Preceded by: Jesse D. Locker
- Succeeded by: Elbert G. Mathews

Personal details
- Born: December 21, 1893 Albany, Georgia, U.S.
- Died: 1975 (aged 81–82)
- Party: Republican
- Spouse: Elgetha Jones
- Children: Richard L. Jones III
- Education: University of Cincinnati

Richard Lee Jones (December 21, 1893 – 1975) was an American diplomat.

== Early life ==
Jones was born on December 21, 1893, in Albany, Georgia. He was of African ancestry. He studied at the University of Cincinnati in Ohio, where he received a Bachelor of Science. He later studied law at the University of Illinois until World War I began, in which he enlisted.

== Diplomatic career ==
Jones was appointed by President Dwight D. Eisenhower to the position of United States Ambassador to Liberia on May 31, 1955. The presentation of his credentials occurred on June 24, 1955. He remained in this position until July 24, 1959.

== Personal life ==
At some point in his life, Jones lived in Illinois.

== Death ==
Jones died in 1975.
