= Archie Owen Dawson =

American judge (1898-1964)

Judge of the United States District Court for the Southern District of New York
- In office April 27, 1954 – August 3, 1964
- Appointed by: Dwight D. Eisenhower
- Preceded by: Henry W. Goddard
- Succeeded by: Constance Baker Motley

Personal details
- Born: Archie Owen Dawson; October 9, 1898 Pomfret, Connecticut
- Died: August 3, 1964 (aged 65)
- Education: Columbia University (A.B.); Columbia Law School (LL.B.)

Archie Owen Dawson (October 9, 1898 – August 3, 1964) was a United States district judge of the United States District Court for the Southern District of New York.

== Education and career ==
Born in Pomfret, Connecticut, Dawson received an Artium Baccalaureus degree from Columbia University in 1921 and a Bachelor of Laws from Columbia Law School in 1923. He was in private practice in New York City, New York from 1923 to 1954, interrupted by service as a private in the United States Army during World War II. He was a Delegate to the New York State Constitutional Convention in 1933. He served as President of The New York Young Republican Club from 1933 to 1934.

== Federal judicial service ==
On April 6, 1954, Dawson was nominated by President Dwight D. Eisenhower to a seat on the United States District Court for the Southern District of New York vacated by Judge Henry W. Goddard. Dawson was confirmed by the United States Senate on April 23, 1954, and received his commission on April 27, 1954. Dawson served in that capacity until his death on August 3, 1964.

== Sources ==
Legal offices
Preceded by Henry W. Goddard	Judge of the United States District Court for the Southern District of New York; 1954–1964	Succeeded by Constance Baker Motley
