= William P. Lambertson =

American politician

William Purnell Lambertson
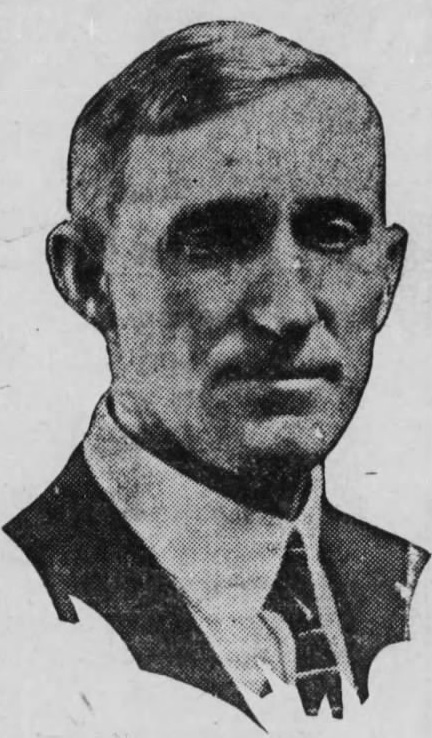
- Lambertson, c. 1922

Member of the U.S. House of Representatives from Kansas's 1st district
- In office March 4, 1929 – January 3, 1945
- Preceded by: Daniel Read Anthony Jr.
- Succeeded by: Albert M. Cole

Member of the Kansas House of Representatives
- In office 1909-1911; 1919-1921

Member of the Kansas Senate
- In office 1913-1915

Personal details
- Born: March 23, 1880 Fairview, Kansas, U.S.
- Died: October 26, 1957 (aged 77) Fairview, Kansas, U.S.
- Party: Republican

William Purnell Lambertson (March 23, 1880 – October 26, 1957) was a U.S. representative from Kansas.

Born in Fairview, Kansas, Lambertson attended the public schools, Ottawa (Kansas) University, and the law school of the University of Chicago, Chicago, Illinois. He engaged in agricultural pursuits. He served as a member of the State house of representatives 1909-1911 and 1919–1921, serving as speaker pro tempore in 1911 and as speaker in 1919. He served in the State senate 1913–1915. He served as chairman of Kansas State Efficiency and Economy Commission in 1917. He served as a member of Kansas State Board of Administration 1923–1925. He was an unsuccessful candidate for nomination for governor in 1922 and for Congress in 1924 and 1926.

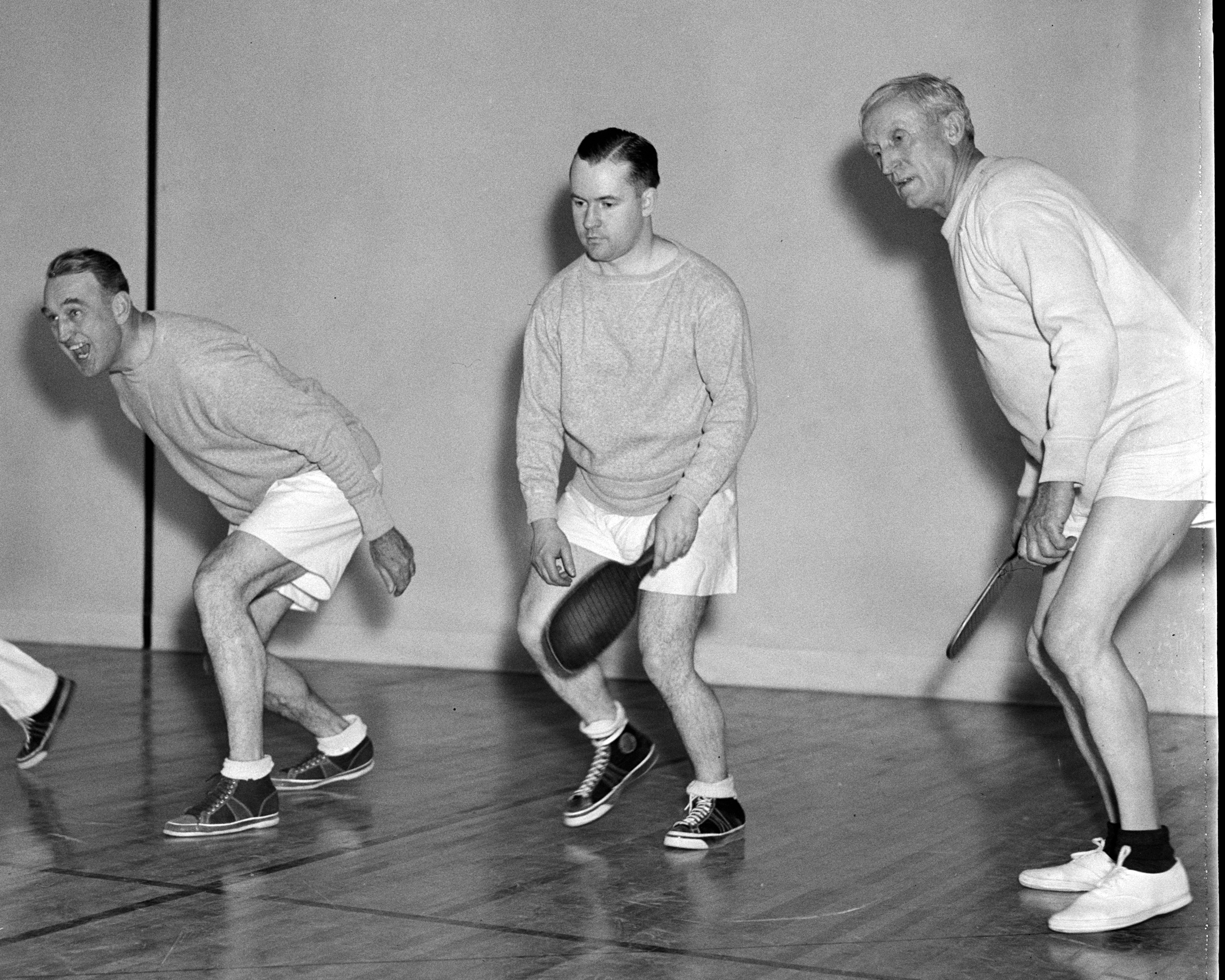
William P. Lambertson (right) during a joint unit in a sports gymnasium of the Capitol complex with members James M. Mead (left) from New York and Elmer Ryan from Minnesota.

Lambertson was elected as a Republican to the Seventy-first and to the seven succeeding Congresses (March 4, 1929 – January 3, 1945). He was an unsuccessful candidate for renomination in 1944. He returned to his farm near Fairview, Kansas. He was defeated for the Republican nomination to Congress in 1946. He served as mayor of Fairview from April 1949 until he resigned in December 1952. He served as chairman of the Board of County Commissioners of Brown County, Kansas from 1953 to 1956. He died in Fairview, Kansas, October 26, 1957. He was interred in Sabetha Cemetery, Sabetha, Kansas.

U.S. House of Representatives
Preceded by Daniel Read Anthony Jr.	Member of the U.S. House of Representatives from Kansas's 1st congressional district 1929–1945	Succeeded by Albert M. Cole
