= Housing and Home Finance Agency =

Responsible for the housing programs of the United States from 1947–1965

Agency overview
- Formed: July 24, 1947
- Preceding agency: National Housing Agency
- Dissolved: September 9, 1965
- Superseding agency: Housing and Urban Development Department

The Housing and Home Finance Agency (HHFA) was responsible for the principal housing programs of the United States from 1947 to 1965. It was superseded by the U.S. Department of Housing and Urban Development and preceded by the National Housing Agency. The HHFA was led by former Federal Housing Administration Commissioner, Raymond M. Foley, from its inception in 1947 to 1953 and by former Kansas Congressman Albert M. Cole from 1953 to 1959 where he oversaw the Housing Act of 1954. In 1960 Jack T. Conway became the Deputy Administrator and acting Administrator until Robert C. Weaver's appointment in February 1961 through to its dissolution in 1965 when Robert C. Weaver took over as the Secretary of the superseding Department of Housing and Urban Development.

== Organizational history ==
HHFA was established as a permanent agency by Reorganization Plan No. 3 of 1947, effective July 24, 1947, replacing the National Housing Agency. Initially consisted of Federal Housing Administration, Public Housing Administration, and Federal Home Loan Bank Board, the last of which separated from HHFA in 1955. It acquired the Federal National Mortgage Association from the Federal Loan Agency as a constituent unit in 1950. The HHFA Division of Community Facilities and Operations and HHFA Division of Slum Clearance and Urban Redevelopment were redesignated the Community Facilities Administration and Urban Renewal Administration and elevated to constituent unit status in 1954. The Federal Flood Indemnity Administration operated as a HHFA constituent unit from 1956 to 1957. HHFA was superseded by the Department of Housing and Urban Development in 1965.

=== National Housing Agency Administrators ===
| Name | Start | End | President(s) |
|---|---|---|---|
| John Blandford | February 16, 1942 | January 26, 1946 | Franklin D. Roosevelt (1933–1945) |
| John Blandford | February 16, 1942 | January 26, 1946 | Harry S. Truman (1945–1953) |
| Wilson Wyatt | January 26, 1946 | December 12, 1946 | Harry S. Truman (1945–1953) |
| Raymond Foley | December 12, 1946 | July 24, 1947 | Harry S. Truman (1945–1953) |

=== HHFA Administrators ===
Denotes acting capacity.

| Name | Start | End | President(s) |
|---|---|---|---|
| Raymond Foley | July 24, 1947 | January 20, 1953 | Harry S. Truman (1945–1953) |
| Albert M. Cole | March 11, 1953 | January 13, 1959 | Dwight D. Eisenhower (1953–1961) |
| Norman P. Mason | January 13, 1959 | January 20, 1961 | Dwight D. Eisenhower (1953–1961) |
| Jack T. Conway; Acting | January 20, 1961 | February 11, 1961 | John F. Kennedy (1961–1963) |
| Robert C. Weaver | February 11, 1961 | January 18, 1966 | John F. Kennedy (1961–1963) |
| Robert C. Weaver | February 11, 1961 | January 18, 1966 | Lyndon B. Johnson (1963–1969) |
