= Percy Sutton =

American politician (1920–2009)

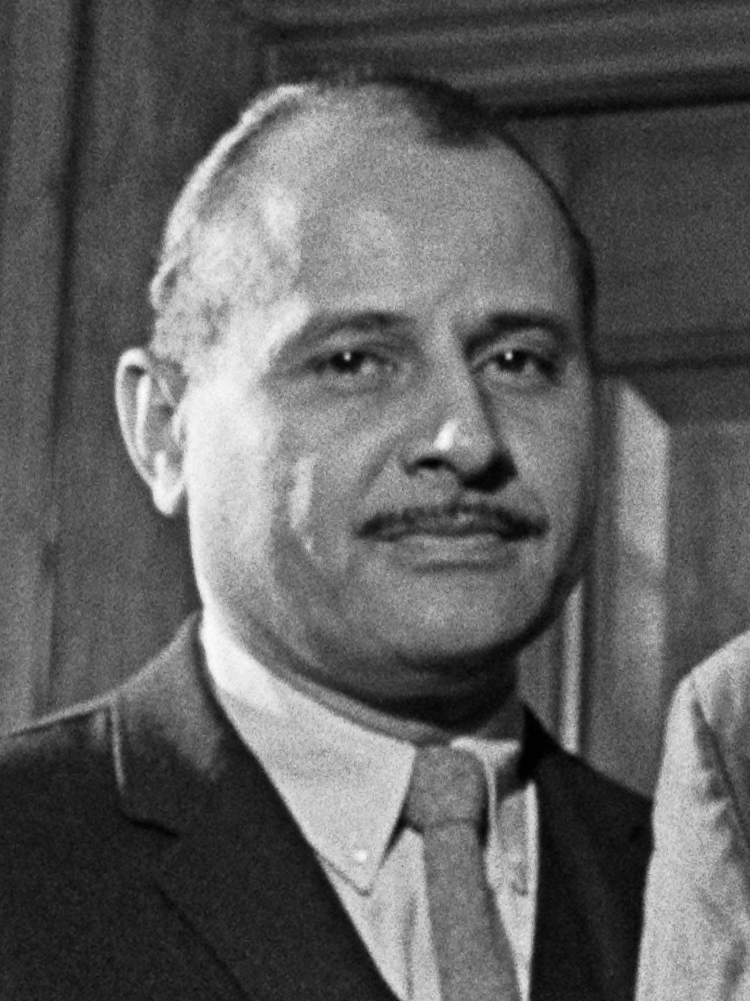
- Sutton in 1967

21st Manhattan Borough President
- In office September 13, 1966 – December 31, 1977
- Preceded by: Constance Baker Motley
- Succeeded by: Andrew Stein

Personal details
- Born: Percy Ellis Sutton; November 24, 1920 San Antonio, Texas, US
- Died: December 26, 2009 (aged 89) New York City, US
- Resting place: Gates of Heaven Memorial Cemetery, San Antonio
- Party: Democratic
- Spouse: Leatrice O'Farrel Sutton
- Education: Prairie View A&M University; Tuskegee Institute; Hampton Institute; Columbia Law School; Brooklyn Law School (LLB)
- Occupation: Activist in the Civil Rights Movement, entrepreneur, lawyer

Military service
- Branch/service: United States Army Air Corps
- Years of service: 1941–1945
- Rank: Captain
- Battles/wars: World War II

Percy Ellis Sutton (November 24, 1920 – December 26, 2009) was an American political and business leader. An activist in the Civil Rights Movement and lawyer, he was also a Freedom Rider and the legal representative for Malcolm X. He was the highest-ranking African-American elected official in New York City when he was Manhattan borough president from 1966 to 1977, the longest tenure at that position. He later became an entrepreneur whose investments included the New York Amsterdam News and the Apollo Theater in Harlem.

== Early life, military service, education, and family ==
Sutton was born in San Antonio, Texas, the youngest of fifteen children born to Samuel Johnson Sutton and his wife, Lillian.

His father, an early civil-rights activist, was one of the first black civil servants a teacher and school administrator in Bexar County, Texas, and used the initials "S.J." for fear his first name, Samuel, would be shortened to Sambo. In addition to being a full-time educator, S.J. farmed, sold real estate and owned a mattress factory, funeral home and skating rink.

Sutton's siblings included G. J. Sutton, who became the first black elected official in San Antonio, and Oliver Sutton, a judge on the New York Supreme Court.

At age twelve, Percy stowed away on a passenger train to New York City, where he slept under a sign on 155th Street in the Harlem neighborhood of the Manhattan borough of the city. His oldest sister, Lillian Sutton Taylor, who was 20 years his senior, was attending Columbia Teacher's College at the time. His oldest brother, John Sutton, a food scientist who had studied under George Washington Carver, and also in Russia, was living in New York at the time Percy arrived there. His family was committed to civil rights, and he bristled at racism. At age thirteen, while passing out leaflets in an all-white neighborhood for the National Association for the Advancement of Colored People (NAACP), he was beaten by a policeman.

He joined the Boy Scouts of America and attained the rank of Eagle Scout in 1936 and was recognized with the Distinguished Eagle Scout Award as an adult. Sutton stated that scouting was a key factor in shaping his life. Percy and Leatrice Sutton married in 1943. He later took up stunt-flying on the barnstorming circuit, but gave it up after a friend crashed.

During World War II, he served as an intelligence officer with the Tuskegee Airmen – the popular name of a group of African American pilots who flew with distinction during World War II as the 332nd Fighter Group of the U.S. Army Air Forces. He won combat stars in the Italian and Mediterranean theaters.

Sutton attended Prairie View A&M University in Prairie View, Texas; the Tuskegee Institute in Tuskegee, Alabama; and the Hampton Institute in Hampton, Virginia without receiving a degree. He went on to attend Columbia Law School and Brooklyn Law School, ultimately receiving his LL.B. from the latter institution in 1950. Shortly thereafter, he was admitted to the New York bar.

== Legal career ==
During the 1950s and 1960s, Sutton became one of America's best-known lawyers. He represented many controversial figures, such as Malcolm X. After the murder of Malcolm X in 1965, Sutton and his brother Oliver helped to cover the expenses of his widow, Betty Shabazz.

In June 1961 Sutton and Mark Lane were arrested for breach of the peace in Hawkins Field, Mississippi after they attempted to use a white-only bathroom together.

== Harlem leader ==
Sutton was a longtime leader in Harlem politics, and was a leader of the Harlem Clubhouse, also known as the "Gang of Four". The Clubhouse has dominated Democratic politics in Harlem since the 1960s. His allies in running the Clubhouse were New York City Mayor David Dinkins, U.S. Representative Charles Rangel, and New York Secretary of State Basil Paterson – whose son, David Paterson, became New York Governor in 2008. Sutton was the one who told David Paterson he should run for the State Senate. He also was a life member of the Kappa Alpha Psi fraternity.

== Political career ==
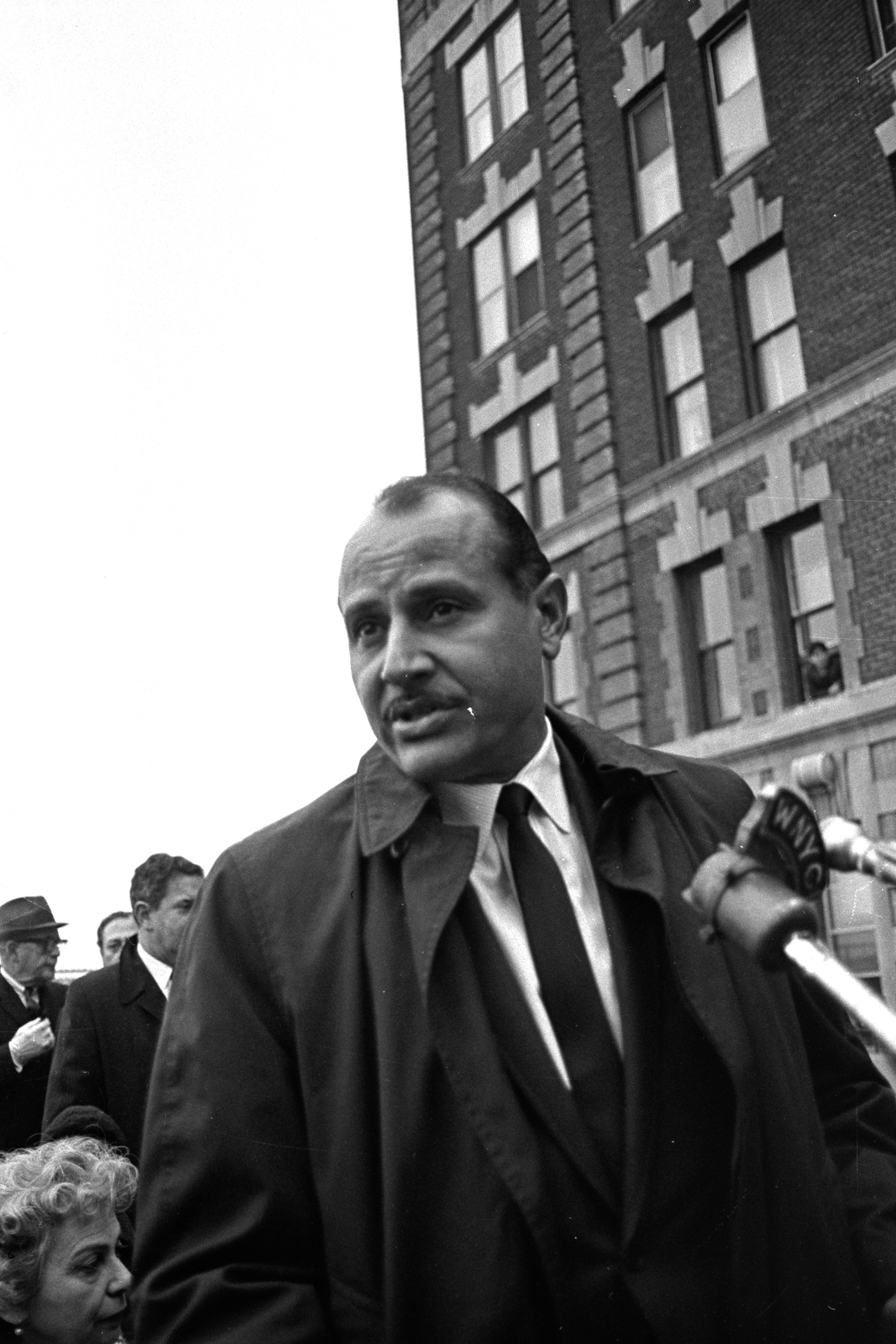
Sutton at the dedication of Freedom Place in Manhattan, named for slain civil rights activists James Chaney, Andrew Goodman, and Michael Schwerner, November 25, 1967

He was a member of the New York State Assembly in 1965 and 1966. He sponsored a bill to develop what became known as the Percy Ellis Sutton Search for Education, Elevation, and Knowledge (SEEK) Program. On September 13, 1966, he was elected Borough President of Manhattan, to fill the vacancy caused by the appointment of Constance Baker Motley to the federal bench. He served in that post until 1977, when he ran for the Democratic nomination for New York City Mayor against Bella Abzug, a former U.S. Representative; U.S. Representative Herman Badillo; incumbent New York City Mayor Abraham Beame; New York Secretary of State Mario Cuomo; and U.S. Representative Ed Koch; Koch won the nomination and the general election.

In his race for mayor, Sutton surprised his liberal political base when he turned temporarily to the right. He assailed the rising crime rate, as he termed the situation "a city turned sick with the fear of crime". He attacked criminals for "cheating, stealing, and driving away our families and our jobs." His candidacy was fatally injured by racial backlash that followed the looting and arson during the New York City blackout of 1977, directly precipitating his retrenchment from politics:

"It was an especially cruel fate for ... Sutton, a master builder of color-blind alliances, who had long been tapped most likely to become New York's first black mayor. (New York magazine titled a May 1974 Sutton profile 'Guess Who's Coming to Gracie Mansion?'")

== Private sector ==
In 1971, Sutton cofounded the Inner City Broadcasting Corporation which purchased New York City's WLIB-AM, and WBLS FM the city's first African-American-owned radio station.

Sutton served in the New York City Police Department Auxiliary Police during the late 1970s.

Sutton produced It's Showtime at the Apollo, a syndicated, music television show first broadcast on September 12, 1987.

== Awards and honors ==
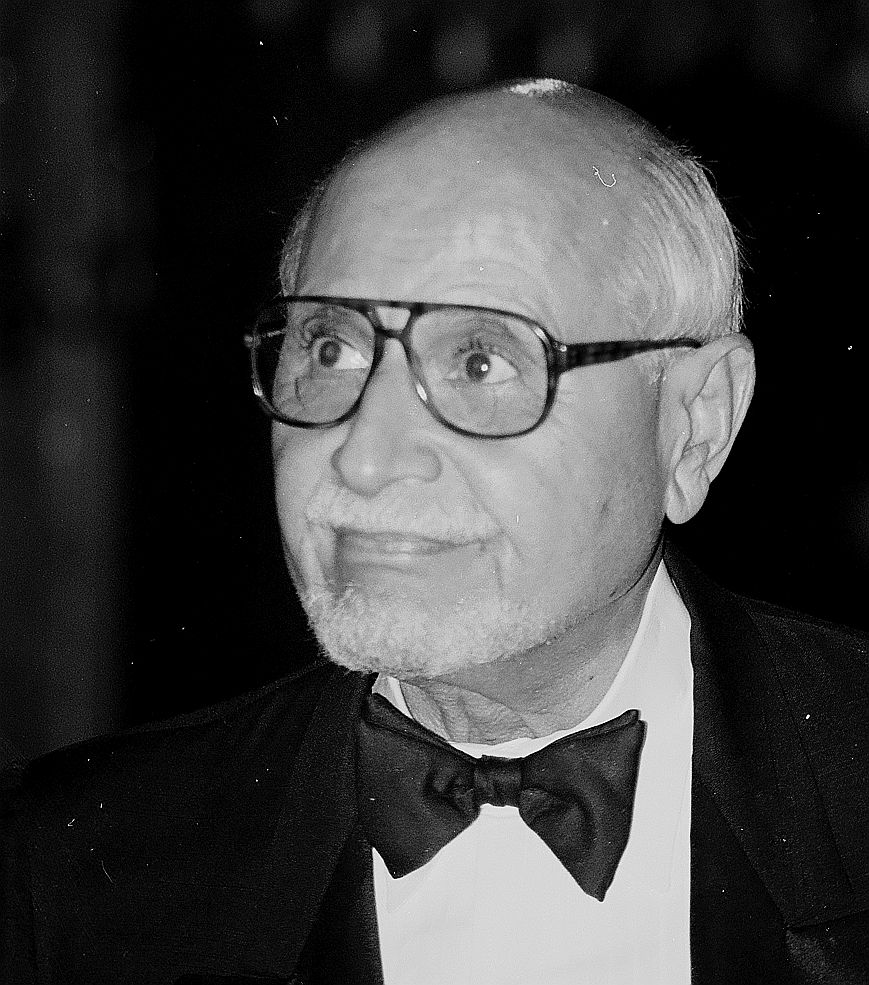
Sutton in 2001

In 1987, Sutton was awarded the Spingarn Medal, an award presented annually by the NAACP for outstanding achievement by an African American. In 1992, he received a Candace Award from the National Coalition of 100 Black Women.

In 2024, Sutton was inducted into the Radio Hall of Fame.

== See also ==
- Dogfights (TV series)
- Executive Order 9981
- Freeman Field Mutiny
- List of Tuskegee Airmen
- Military history of African Americans
- The Tuskegee Airmen (movie)
- Tuskegee Airmen
- Gang of Four (Harlem)
- David Paterson
- J. Raymond Jones
- List of people from Harlem

New York State Assembly
Preceded by Lloyd E. Dickens	New York State Assembly; New York County, 11th District; 1965	Succeeded by district abolished
Preceded by new district	New York State Assembly; 77th District; 1966	Succeeded by Robert García
Political offices
Preceded by Constance Baker Motley	Borough President of Manhattan; 1966–1977	Succeeded by Andrew Stein
