= Jesse D. Locker =

American diplomat (1891–1955)

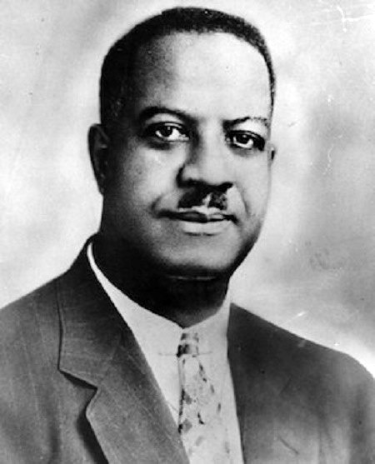

United States Ambassador to Liberia
- In office October 16, 1953 – April 10, 1955
- President: Dwight D. Eisenhower
- Preceded by: Edward Richard Dudley
- Succeeded by: Richard Lee Jones

Member of the Cincinnati City Council
- In office 1941–1953

Personal details
- Born: May 31, 1891 Cincinnati, Ohio, U.S.
- Died: April 10, 1955 (aged 63) Monrovia, Liberia
- Party: Republican
- Education: Howard University

Jesse Dwight Locker (May 31, 1891, College Hill, Cincinnati – April 10, 1955, Monrovia, Liberia) was an attorney, politician and, when he was appointed the American ambassador to Liberia, the second African American appointed as ambassador. His father, Laban Locker, was the first black minister in Ohio to be ordained in the Christian Church. Jesse graduated valedictorian of his class at College Hill High School and graduated from Howard University with a law degree in 1945. He returned to Cincinnati and spent 35 years practicing law. He was elected to the Cincinnati City Council, on the Republican ticket, in 1941, serving almost 12 years. He was the first African American elected to the council. In 1951, Locker was elected its president. Locker also was president of the segregated Hamilton County Bar Association for Negro Lawyers.

While ambassador, Locke led “the multi-faceted negotiations between the private sector (Pan American and US Airlines), the government of Liberia, and the United States, with regards to the operations of the Roberts Field airport, the first international airport in Liberia.”

Locker suffered a stroke on April 4, 1955, in Monrovia and he died there on April 10.
