= Henry W. Goddard =

American judge (1876-1955)

Senior Judge of the United States District Court for the Southern District of New York
- In office February 1, 1954 – August 26, 1955

Judge of the United States District Court for the Southern District of New York
- In office January 4, 1923 – February 1, 1954
- Appointed by: Warren G. Harding
- Preceded by: Seat established by 42 Stat. 837
- Succeeded by: Archie Owen Dawson

Personal details
- Born: Henry Warren Goddard; May 4, 1876 New York City, New York
- Died: July 26, 1955 (aged 79) Madison, Connecticut
- Education: New York Law School (LL.B.)

Henry Warren Goddard (May 4, 1876 – August 26, 1955) was a United States district judge of the United States District Court for the Southern District of New York.

Goddard was a federal judge to the United States District Court for the Southern District of New York. Goddard was nominated by President Warren G. Harding on December 28, 1922, to a new seat created by 42 Stat. 837; He was confirmed by the United States Senate on January 4, 1923, and received commission the same day. Assumed senior status on February 1, 1954. Goddard's service was terminated on August 26, 1955, due to death.

He died in Madison, Connecticut.

== Education and career ==
Born on May 4, 1876, in New York City, New York, Goddard received a Bachelor of Laws in 1901 from New York Law School. He was in private practice in New York City from 1901 to 1923. In 1911 he helped found The New York Young Republican Club.

== Federal judicial service ==
Goddard was nominated by President Warren G. Harding on December 28, 1922, to the United States District Court for the Southern District of New York, to a new seat authorized by 42 Stat. 837. He was confirmed by the United States Senate on January 4, 1923, and received his commission the same day. He assumed senior status on February 1, 1954. His service terminated on August 26, 1955, due to his death in Madison, Connecticut.

=== Notable cases ===
Civil cases heard by Goddard included a 1929 suit filed by Anne Nichols against Universal Pictures, alleging that the screenplay for the film The Cohens and Kellys was plagiarized from Nichols' Broadway play Abie's Irish Rose. Goddard's conclusion that there had been no copyright infringement was affirmed by the United States Court of Appeals for the Second Circuit in an opinion by Learned Hand. Goddard also ruled on the invasion-of-privacy case that William James Sidis filed against The New Yorker magazine, based on an article written by James Thurber; Goddard's decision to dismiss that case was affirmed by the Second Circuit in a widely cited ruling.

In still another case involving media issues, Goddard signed a consent decree in 1940 ending the practice of block booking of motion pictures into theatres. In 1948, Goddard presided over the case of Danny Gardella, who challenged the antitrust exemption for major league baseball in a dispute arising from his attempt to return to the major leagues after having played a season in the Mexican League.

In criminal matters, Goddard was best known as the judge who presided over the second perjury trial of Alger Hiss, in 1949 and 1950, after Hiss's earlier trial before Judge Samuel Kaufman resulted in a hung jury. Goddard was more lenient in his evidentiary rulings than Kaufman had been, allowing both prosecutor Thomas Murphy and Hiss's counsel, Claude Cross, to elicit testimony that Kaufman had excluded, including the opinion of a psychiatrist who had examined the government's key witness, Whittaker Chambers. Hiss was convicted at the second trial, and Goddard sentenced him to five years in federal prison. In 1952, Hiss moved for a retrial based on newly discovered evidence relating to the typewriter on which certain incriminating documents had been typed. Goddard denied the motion, finding that Hiss failed to establish that he would probably have been acquitted had the new evidence been presented to the jury.

Goddard also presided over other criminal cases ranging from violations of Prohibition in the 1920s, to espionage charges against German and German-American defendants, including Anthony Cramer, during World War II.

== Charity ==
Off the bench, Goddard was heavily involved in charity work on behalf of the blind, including appeals for public support for The Lighthouse.

== See also ==
- List of United States federal judges by longevity of service

== Sources ==
Legal offices
Preceded by Seat established by 42 Stat. 837	Judge of the United States District Court for the Southern District of New York; 1923–1954	Succeeded by Archie Owen Dawson
