= Fairview, Kansas =

City in Brown County, Kansas

- City
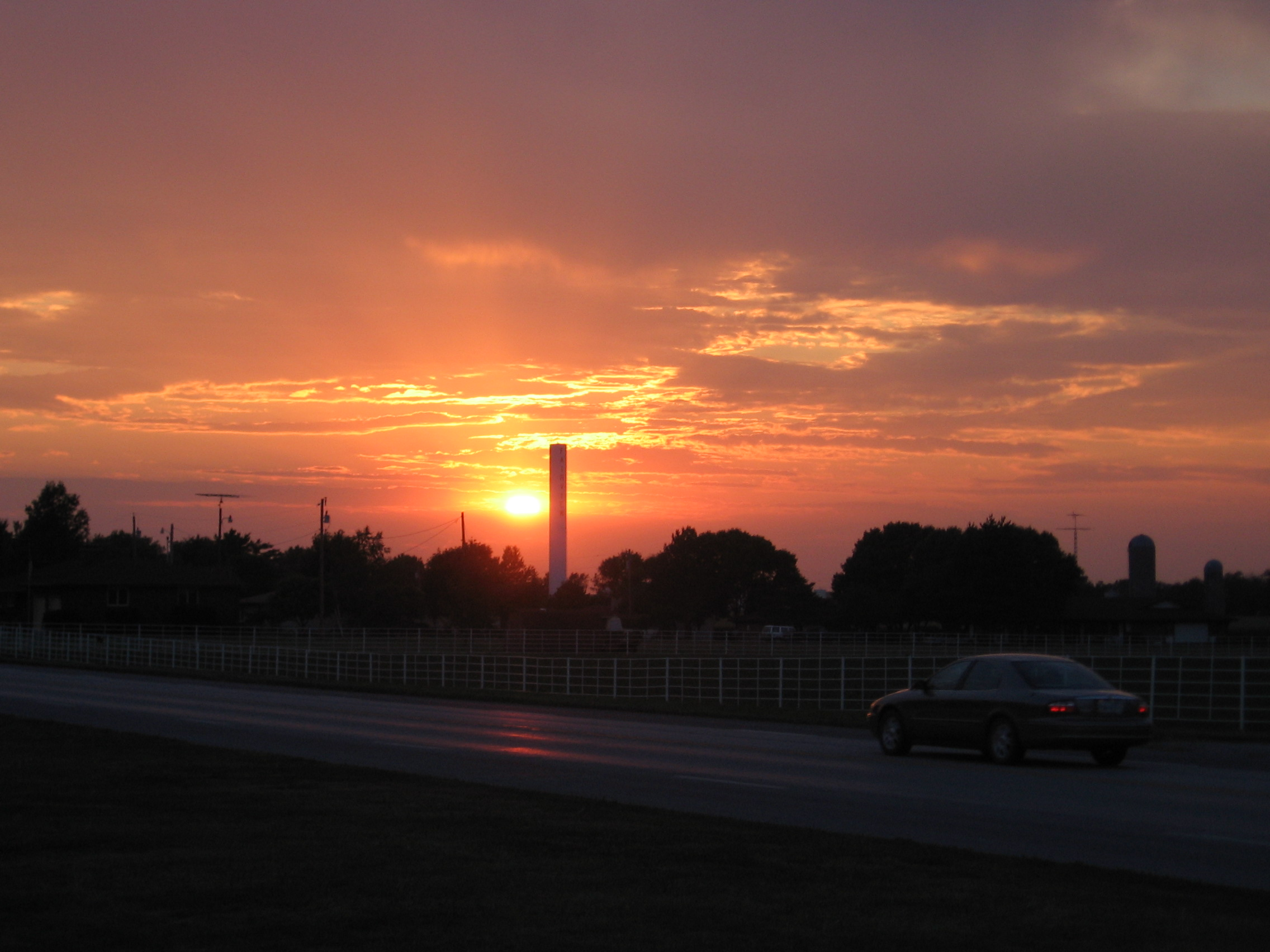
- Sunset in Fairview, looking across US 36 (2006)

- Location within Brown County and Kansas

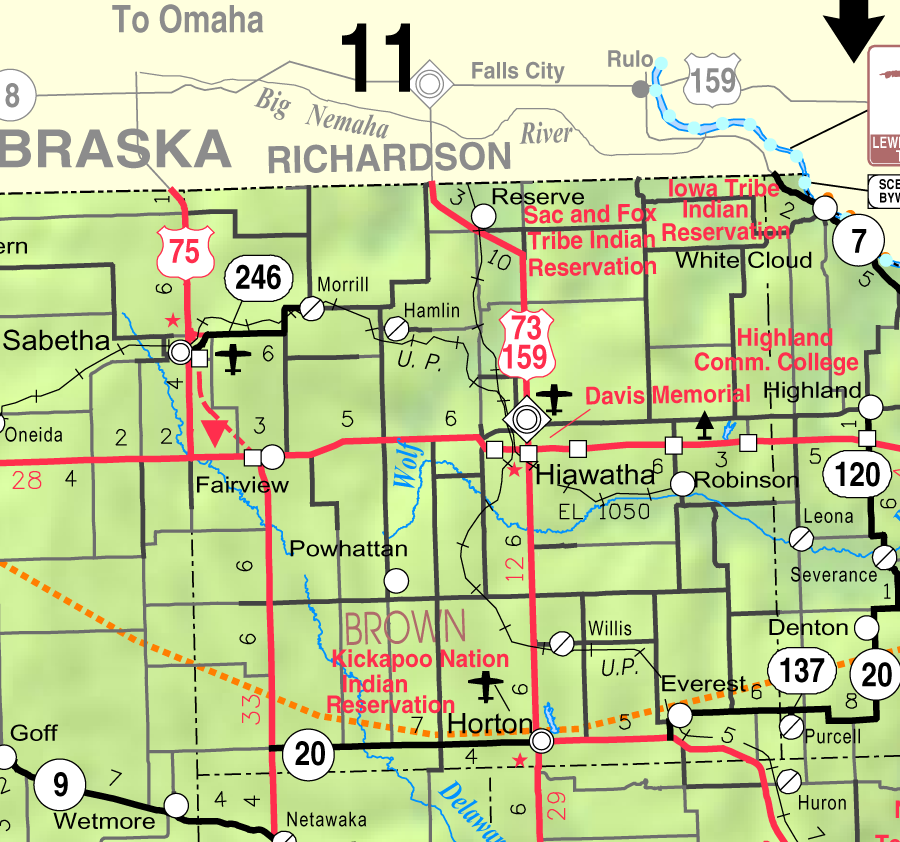
- KDOT map of Brown County (legend)
- Coordinates: 39°50′22″N 95°43′41″W
- Country: United States
- State: Kansas
- County: Brown
- Founded: 1872
- Incorporated: 1886

Area
  - Total: 0.36 sq mi (0.93 km^{2})
  - Land: 0.36 sq mi (0.93 km^{2})
  - Water: 0 sq mi (0.00 km^{2})
- Elevation: 1,221 ft (372 m)

Population (2020)
  - Total: 240
  - Density: 670/sq mi (260/km^{2})
- Time zone: UTC-6 (CST)
  - Summer (DST): UTC-5 (CDT)
- ZIP Code: 66425
- Area code: 785
- FIPS code: 20-22425
- GNIS ID: 2394736
- Website: www.fairviewkansas.com

Fairview is a city in Brown County, Kansas, United States. As of the 2020 census, the population of the city was 240.

== History ==
Fairview was founded on October 27, 1886, on land purchased in 1872 by W. F. Lambertson. It was named for its scenic setting.

== Geography ==
According to the United States Census Bureau, the city has a total area of 0.37 square miles (0.96 km^{2}), all land.

== Demographics ==
Historical population
Census	Pop.	Note	%±
1900	395		—
1910	386		−2.3%
1920	386		0.0%
1930	367		−4.9%
1940	333		−9.3%
1950	336		0.9%
1960	272		−19.0%
1970	283		4.0%
1980	258		−8.8%
1990	306		18.6%
2000	271		−11.4%
2010	260		−4.1%
2020	240		−7.7%
U.S. Decennial Census

=== 2020 census ===
The 2020 United States census counted 240 people, 118 households, and 69 families in Fairview. The population density was 699.7 per square mile (270.2/km^{2}). There were 129 housing units at an average density of 376.1 per square mile (145.2/km^{2}). The racial makeup was 91.67% (220) white or European American (91.67% non-Hispanic white), 0.42% (1) black or African-American, 0.83% (2) Native American or Alaska Native, 0.0% (0) Asian, 0.0% (0) Pacific Islander or Native Hawaiian, 2.5% (6) from other races, and 4.58% (11) from two or more races. Hispanic or Latino of any race was 3.33% (8) of the population.

Of the 118 households, 20.3% had children under the age of 18; 43.2% were married couples living together; 24.6% had a female householder with no spouse or partner present. 32.2% of households consisted of individuals and 14.4% had someone living alone who was 65 years of age or older. The average household size was 2.0 and the average family size was 2.8. The percent of those with a bachelor's degree or higher was estimated to be 9.6% of the population.

17.5% of the population was under the age of 18, 5.4% from 18 to 24, 22.5% from 25 to 44, 32.1% from 45 to 64, and 22.5% who were 65 years of age or older. The median age was 50.0 years. For every 100 females, there were 92.0 males. For every 100 females ages 18 and older, there were 92.2 males.

The 2016–2020 5-year American Community Survey estimates show that the median household income was $50,455 (with a margin of error of +/- $15,771) and the median family income was $69,167 (+/- $5,673). Males had a median income of $36,940 (+/- $3,256) versus $25,000 (+/- $7,228) for females. The median income for those above 16 years old was $35,404 (+/- $2,509). Approximately, 2.5% of families and 5.6% of the population were below the poverty line, including 0.0% of those under the age of 18 and 6.8% of those ages 65 or over.

=== 2010 census ===
As of the census of 2010, there were 260 people, 130 households, and 71 families living in the city. The population density was 702.7 inhabitants per square mile (271.3/km^{2}). There were 146 housing units at an average density of 394.6 per square mile (152.4/km^{2}). The racial makeup of the city was 93.8% White, 1.9% African American, 0.4% Native American, and 3.8% from two or more races. Hispanic or Latino of any race were 0.8% of the population.

There were 130 households, of which 16.9% had children under the age of 18 living with them, 45.4% were married couples living together, 9.2% had a female householder with no husband present, and 45.4% were non-families. 39.2% of all households were made up of individuals, and 15.4% had someone living alone who was 65 years of age or older. The average household size was 2.00 and the average family size was 2.69.

The median age in the city was 51.3 years. 17.3% of residents were under the age of 18; 5.3% were between the ages of 18 and 24; 16.1% were from 25 to 44; 36.1% were from 45 to 64; and 25% were 65 years of age or older. The gender makeup of the city was 49.6% male and 50.4% female.

=== 2000 census ===
As of the census of 2000, there were 271 people, 132 households, and 71 families living in the city. The population density was 912.0 inhabitants per square mile (352.1/km^{2}). There were 149 housing units at an average density of 501.4 per square mile (193.6/km^{2}). The racial makeup of the city was 95.20% White, 3.32% African American, and 1.48% from two or more races. Hispanic or Latino of any race were 1.11% of the population.

There were 132 households, out of which 22.7% had children under the age of 18 living with them, 47.0% were married couples living together, 6.8% had a female householder with no husband present, and 46.2% were non-families. 45.5% of all households were made up of individuals, and 27.3% had someone living alone who was 65 years of age or older. The average household size was 2.05 and the average family size was 2.93.

In the city, the population was spread out, with 20.7% under the age of 18, 4.8% from 18 to 24, 24.4% from 25 to 44, 24.7% from 45 to 64, and 25.5% who were 65 years of age or older. The median age was 45 years. For every 100 females, there were 86.9 males. For every 100 females age 18 and over, there were 90.3 males.

The median income for a household in the city was $31,250, and the median income for a family was $51,607. Males had a median income of $33,333 versus $17,917 for females. The per capita income for the city was $22,789. About 11.0% of families and 9.7% of the population were below the poverty line, including 6.8% of those under the age of eighteen and 15.3% of those 65 or over.

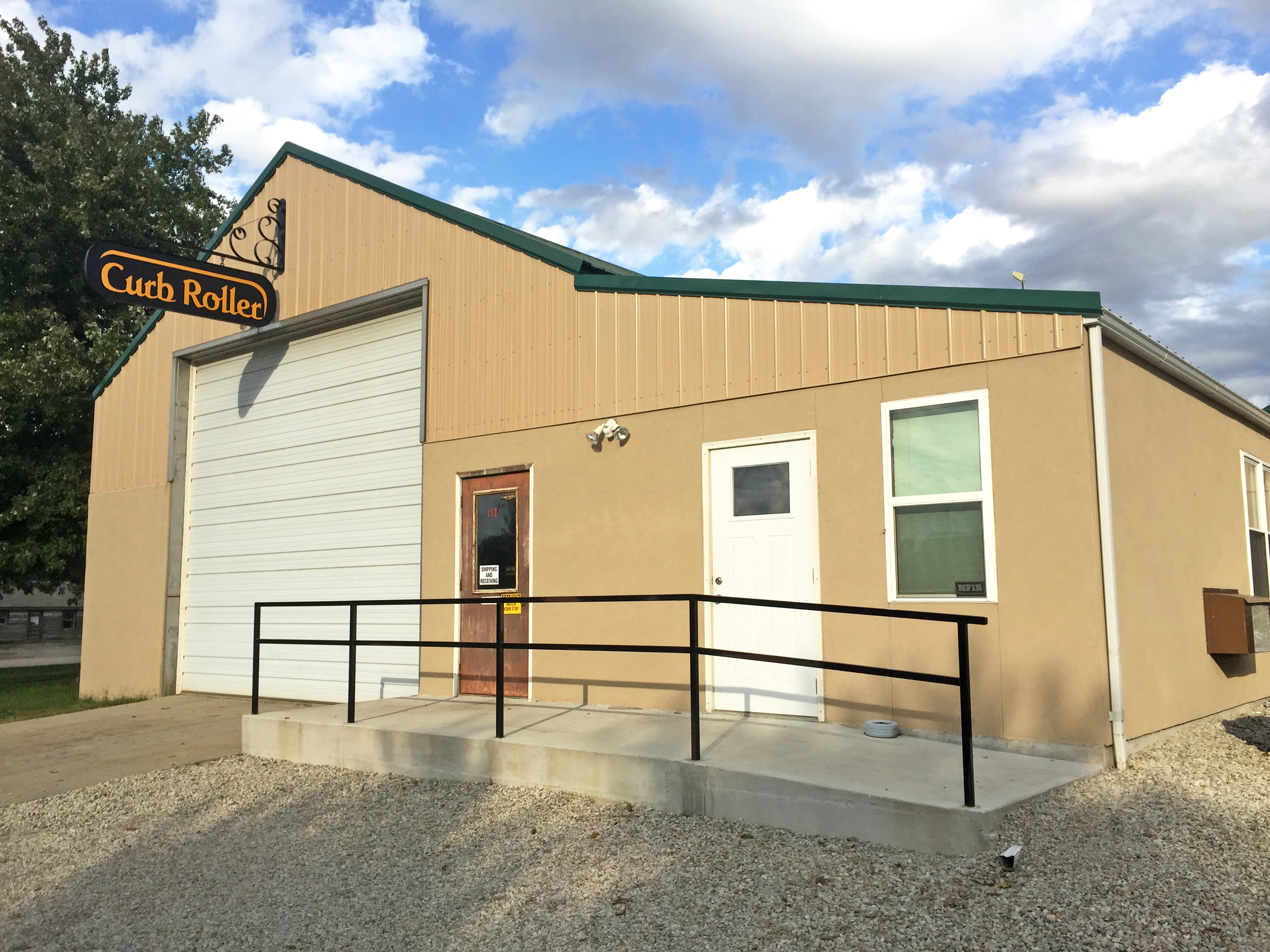
Curb Roller Manufacturing's main building, located off of Highway 36 (2016)

== Economy ==
Although Fairview is mostly a bedroom community to the employees and students of nearby Sabetha and Hiawatha, a few businesses thrive. Services available from local business owners include welding, electrical, trash collection, and plumbing. The Fairview Enterprise is the weekly paper, published in the same building since 1931. The city has also successfully maintained a post office.

Fairview is also currently home to Curb Roller Manufacturing which does business worldwide.

== Notable people ==
- David Floyd Lambertson, former United States Ambassador and Deputy Assistant Secretary of State in Southeast Asia
- William P. Lambertson, U.S. Representative from Kansas
- Bernard W. Rogers, former Supreme Allied Commander Europe (NATO)

== See also ==
- Autovon
