= J. Raymond Jones =

American politician

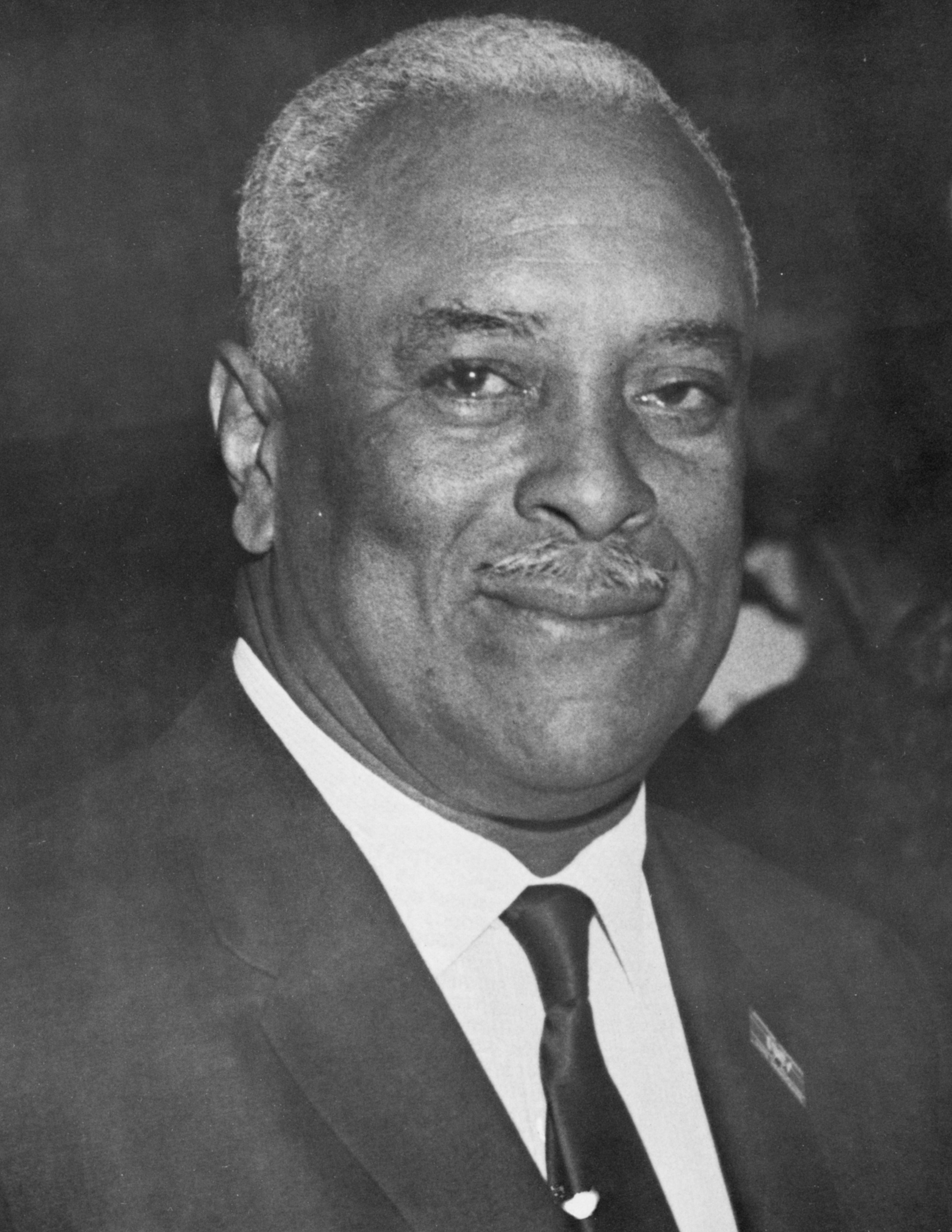
- Jones c. 1966

Grand Sachem of Tammany Hall
- In office December 3, 1964 – March 10, 1967
- Preceded by: Edward N. Costikyan
- Succeeded by: Office dissolved

New York City Councilman District 5
- In office January 1, 1966 – December 31, 1969
- Preceded by: Matthew Troy
- Succeeded by: Charles Taylor

New York City Councilman District 21
- In office March 1, 1963 – December 31, 1965
- Preceded by: Herbert Evans
- Succeeded by: Daniel Diggs

Personal details
- Born: November 19, 1899 St. Thomas, Danish West Indies
- Died: June 9, 1991 (aged 91) New York City, U.S.
- Party: Democratic
- Spouse: Ruth Holloway
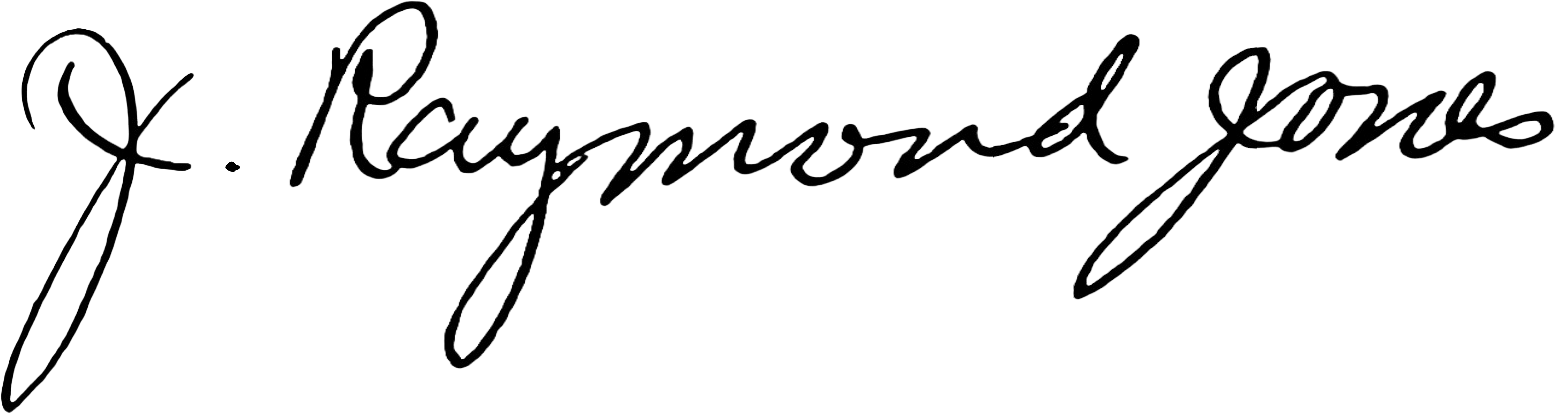
- Signature

John Raymond Jones (November 19, 1899 – June 9, 1991), known as "The Harlem Fox", was an American Democratic Party politician who served on the New York City Council from 1963 to 1969. As the founder and longtime leader of the George Washington Carver Democratic Club, the leading political machine in majority Black Harlem, Jones was a political mentor and patron to two generations of Black Harlem political leaders, including Adam Clayton Powell Jr., Constance Baker Motley, Robert C. Weaver, David Dinkins, Basil A. Paterson, Charles Rangel, and Percy Sutton. He was eventually succeeded by the "Gang of Four", consisting of Dinkins, Paterson, Rangel, and Sutton.

Though he had long been a critic of Tammany Hall under Irish-American and Italian-American leadership, Jones became Tammany's last leader from 1964 to 1967, when the organization was dissolved.

== Early life ==
John Raymond Jones was born on November 19, 1899, in St. Thomas, Danish West Indies (now the U.S. Virgin Islands). He moved to New York City in 1917.

== Political career ==
Upon his arrival in New York, Jones became involved in city politics, serving as an election inspector in 1921 and working for John Francis Hylan, the Democratic candidate for mayor. Jones was enthused by Hylan's proposal to maintain 5 cent fares for New York City subways, but his primary focus was on registering and organizing Black voters in Harlem and ensuring the appointment of Black judges.

According to Jones, he was inspired to found the George Washington Carver Democratic Club during the 1921 campaign, when he delivered voter registration books to the whites-only Cayuga Club and was told he had come to the wrong place. In 1967, a colleague reflecting on their start in politics told The New York Times, "[Jones] worked on a coal barge. ... Your only hope was to get in with the right white person because they had it all. White political leaders ran the old Chicopee Club on St. Nicholas Avenue."

In 1944, Jones was elected Democratic leader for New York's 13th State Assembly district. He worked closely with Mayor William O'Dwyer, who appointed him deputy commissioner of the New York City Department of Housing and Buildings.

In 1956, Adam Clayton Powell Jr. endorsed Eisenhower over Stevenson, breaking with Tammany Hall and the Democratic Party. The Democratic machine put up a primary challenger to Powell in the form of Earl Brown. Jones ran Powell's campaign, easily beating Brown and demonstrating to Tammany they had no power in Harlem.

At the 1960 Democratic National Convention, Jones and Powell supported Lyndon B. Johnson on the first ballot over John F. Kennedy as part of a political deal with Sam Rayburn. In exchange, Rayburn appointed Powell as chairman of the House Committee on Education and Labor. In this role, Powell secured the passage of numerous pieces of landmark legislation during the Kennedy and Johnson administrations, including a large portion of the Great Society programs. Using their influence with the Johnson administration, Powell and Jones succeeded in having allies appointed to federal offices. Constance Baker Motley became the first Black woman appointed to the federal judiciary, and Robert Clifton Weaver was appointed the first United States Secretary of Housing and Urban Development, a position created at Jones's urging. Weaver was also the first Black member of the federal cabinet.

In 1966, Jones was part of the coalition that helped make Bertram L. Baker the first Black majority whip in the history of the New York State Assembly. At the time, this was the highest state office to which any Black politician had ascended.

=== Tammany Hall ===
After Jones opposed Tammany Hall in 1961 by supporting Robert F. Wagner Jr. for re-election, Jones was elected its leader on December 3, 1964, after the ouster of Carmine DeSapio. In 1965, he supported Wagner's choice, Paul R. Screvane, for mayor.

As county chair, Jones came into conflict with U.S. senator Robert F. Kennedy, who joined reform efforts to end Tammany Hall influence and machine politics in New York City by backing an anti-machine candidate for Surrogate Court in the 1966 Democratic primary. Jones resigned as county leader and district leader on March 10, 1967 and left politics entirely. Jones supporter Stanley Ferris observed, "Harlem hasn't voted Republican in 30 years. And this was our reward. Black leaders get discouraged. You work hard, deliver the vote, get a little power, and they pull you down. I don't know, maybe if Kennedy would adopt some Negro leader and boost him up, we might get some initiative back."

He endorsed John Lindsay for re-election in 1969.

== Political legacy ==
Jones also served as a mentor to many younger black politicians who later became prominent in New York politics. His biography, "The Harlem Fox," was written by historian John C. Walter and published by State of New York University Press in 1989.

New York City mayor David N. Dinkins eulogized Jones, "Without his counsel and guidance, Percy Sutton, Constance Baker Motley, Fritz W. Alexander II, Edward R. Dudley, Charlie Rangel, Robert Clifton Weaver, and I might add, David N. Dinkins, would not have achieved as much. He was a true political pioneer and a deeply committed individual who dedicated his life to serving the people of New York."

== Later life and death ==
In 1970, after leaving politics, Jones returned to St. Thomas, where his wife, Ruth Holloway Jones, was collector of customs.

At the end of his life he lived briefly at the Greater Harlem Nursing Home. He died at the North General Hospital in Manhattan on June 9, 1991, at 91 years of age.

Preceded by Herbert Evans	New York City Council, 21st District; 1963–1965	Succeeded by Daniel Diggs
Preceded by Matthew Troy	New York City Council, 5th District; 1966–1969	Succeeded by Charles Taylor
