= Gang of Four (Harlem) =

African-American political coalition

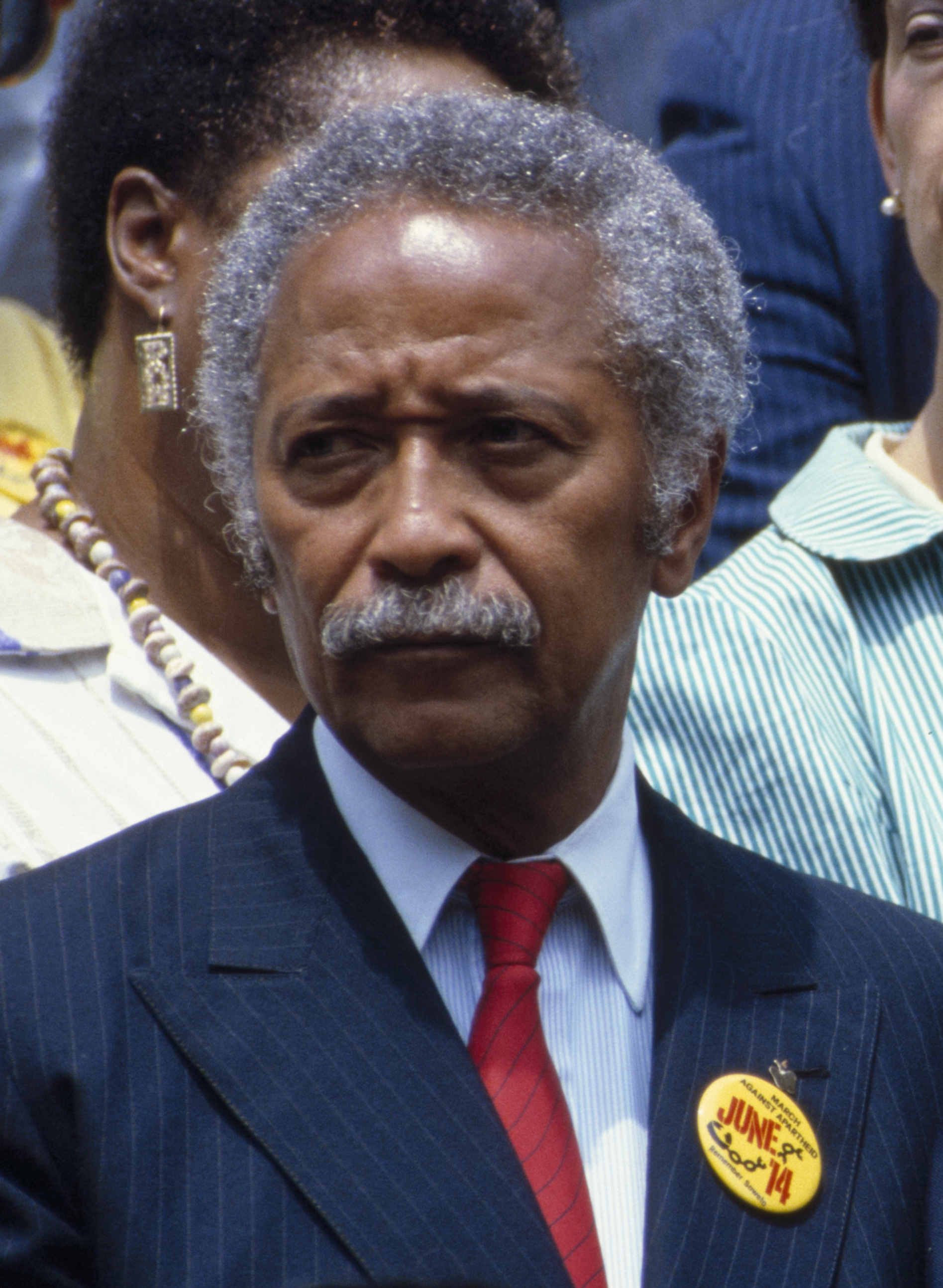
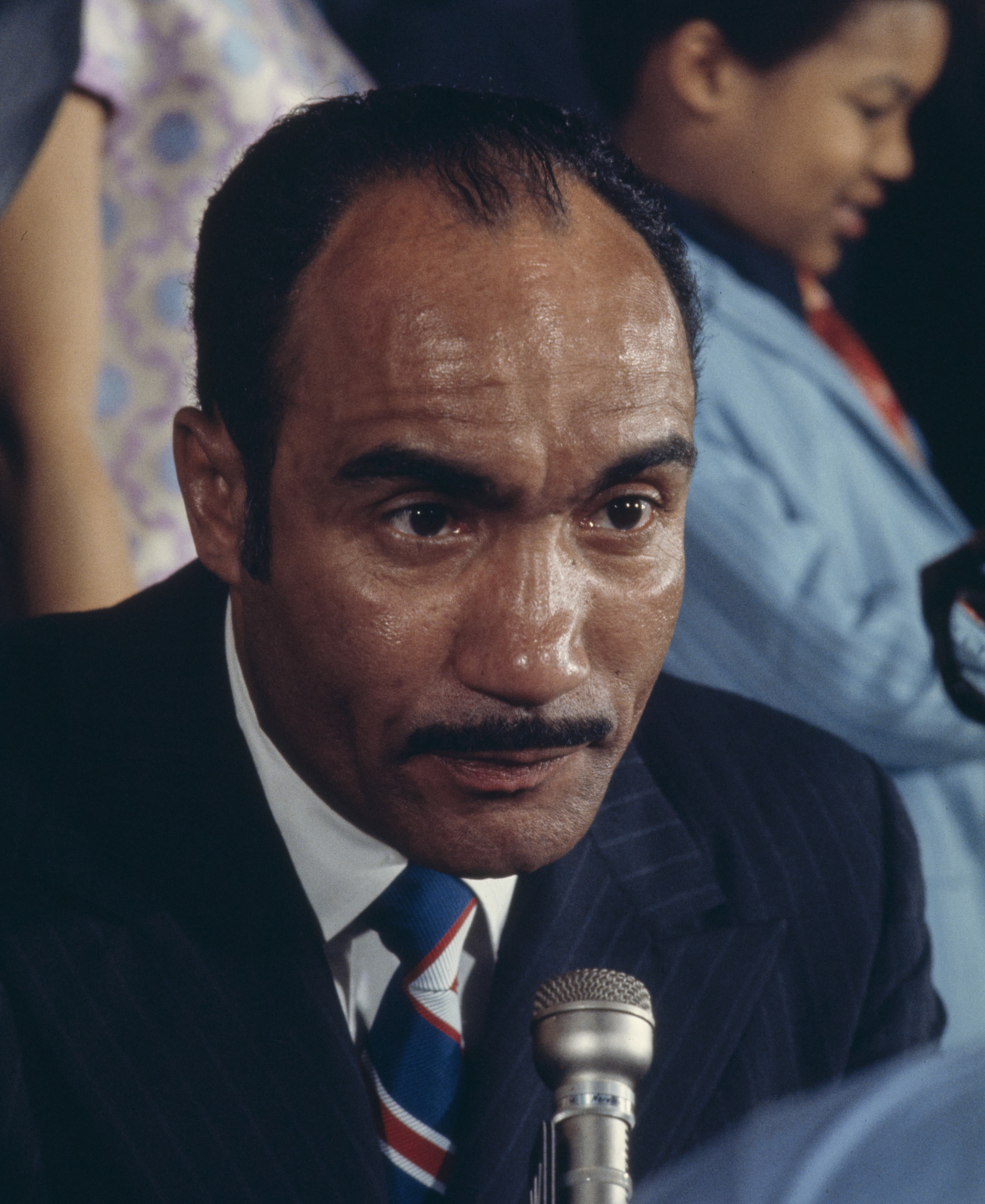
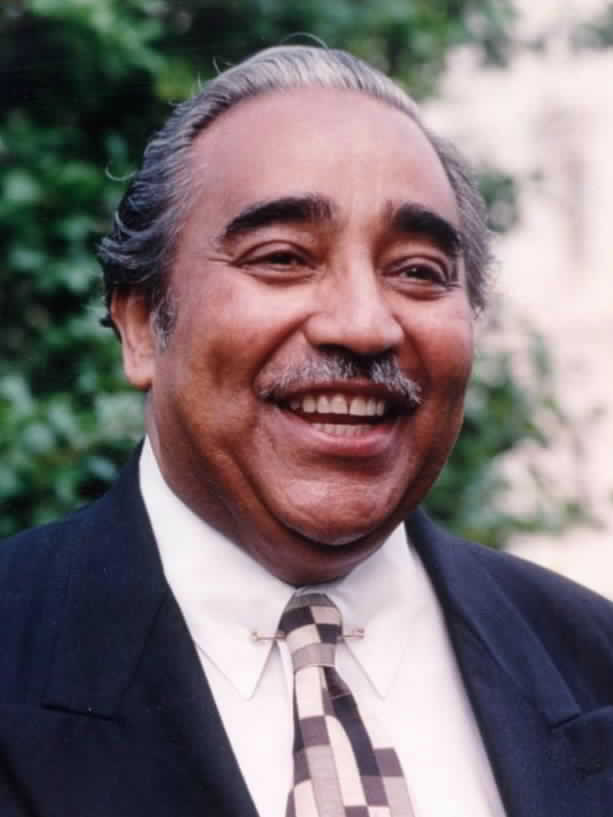
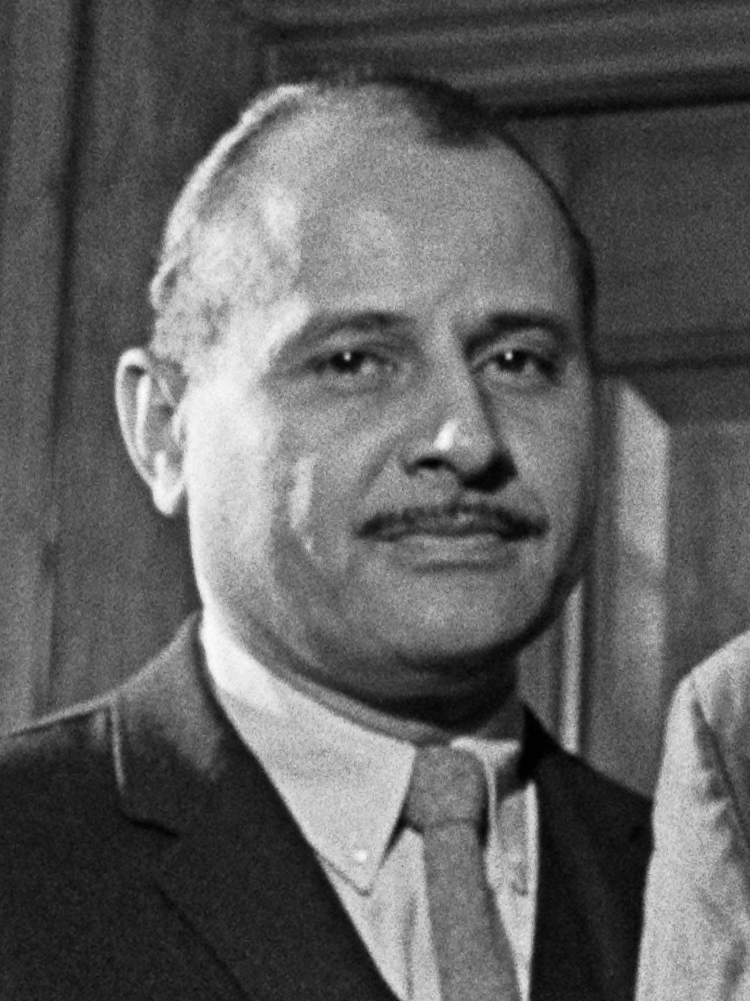
The "Gang of Four", (clockwise, from top left) David Dinkins, Basil Paterson, Percy Sutton and Charles Rangel

The Gang of Four, also known as the Harlem Clubhouse, was an African-American political coalition from Harlem whose members later ascended to top political posts. It is named after the Gang of Four of China. J. Raymond Jones was influential in helping these men obtain power.

== Members ==
The four members were:

- David Dinkins (1927–2020), state Assemblyman, City Board of Elections President, City Clerk, Manhattan Borough President (1986–1989) and Mayor of New York City (1990–1993)
- Basil Paterson (1926–2014), a New York State Senator, Deputy Mayor of New York City, and Secretary of State of New York for Hugh Carey
- Charles Rangel (1930–2025), a state assemblyman, Chairman of Ways and Means Committee from 2007 to 2010, he served in the House from (1971–2017).
- Percy Sutton (1920–2009), one-term state Assemblyman, Manhattan Borough President from 1966 to 1977

== Legacy ==
The son of Basil Paterson, David Paterson, served as Lieutenant Governor of New York from 2007 to 2008 and assumed the position Governor of New York in March 2008 following the resignation of Eliot Spitzer. He was the first African American governor of New York State. He also served as Minority Leader of the State Senate from 2003 to 2006, and in State Senate from 1985 to 2006, running at the advice of Percy Sutton.

Keisha Sutton James, the granddaughter of Percy Sutton, was the campaign manager for Alvin Bragg in his successful nomination for New York County District Attorney. In early 2022, Borough President Mark Levine appointed James as Deputy Borough President for Manhattan. In 1964, Percy Sutton defeated Lloyd Dickens for district leader. In 2023, Keisha Sutton James supported the eventual winner, Yusef Salaam, against Inez Dickens in the Democratic Primary for City Council.

Charles Rangel, the last surviving member of the gang, would maintain a legacy through the City College of New York's Charles B. Rangel Center for Public Service.

== Quotes ==
- Percy Sutton, "Harlemites are limited in the areas where they can seek power. The result is that, since we don't have mobility, those of us who think we have talent have to hustle within circumscribed areas. But Harlem runs on a basic political organization line not much different from any place else. The percentage of registered voters is low, but the average voter is very sophisticated. You can't get by here with what Bill Dawson pulls in Chicago on the South Side. And boss rule in Harlem today is impossible because days when politicians could control government services to grant or withhold favors is gone. We're like social service workers administering things like poverty programs or Haryou. All you can do is promise good government, give personal attention and project your personality."

== Bibliography ==
- John C. Walker,The Harlem Fox: J. Raymond Jones at Tammany 1920:1970, New York: State University New York Press, 1989.
- Paterson, David Black, Blind, & In Charge: A Story of Visionary Leadership and Overcoming Adversity. New York, New York, 2020
- David N. Dinkins, A Mayor's Life: Governing New York's Gorgeous Mosaic, PublicAffairs Books, 2013
- Rangel, Charles B.; Wynter, Leon (2007). And I Haven't Had a Bad Day Since: From the Streets of Harlem to the Halls of Congress. New York: St. Martin's Press.
- Baker Motley, Constance Equal Justice Under The Law: An Autobiography, New York: Farrar, Straus, and Giroux, 1998.
- Jack, Hulan Fifty Years a Democrat:The Autobiography of Hulan Jack New Benjamin Franklin House New York, NY 1983
