= Hulan Jack =

American politician (1906–1986)

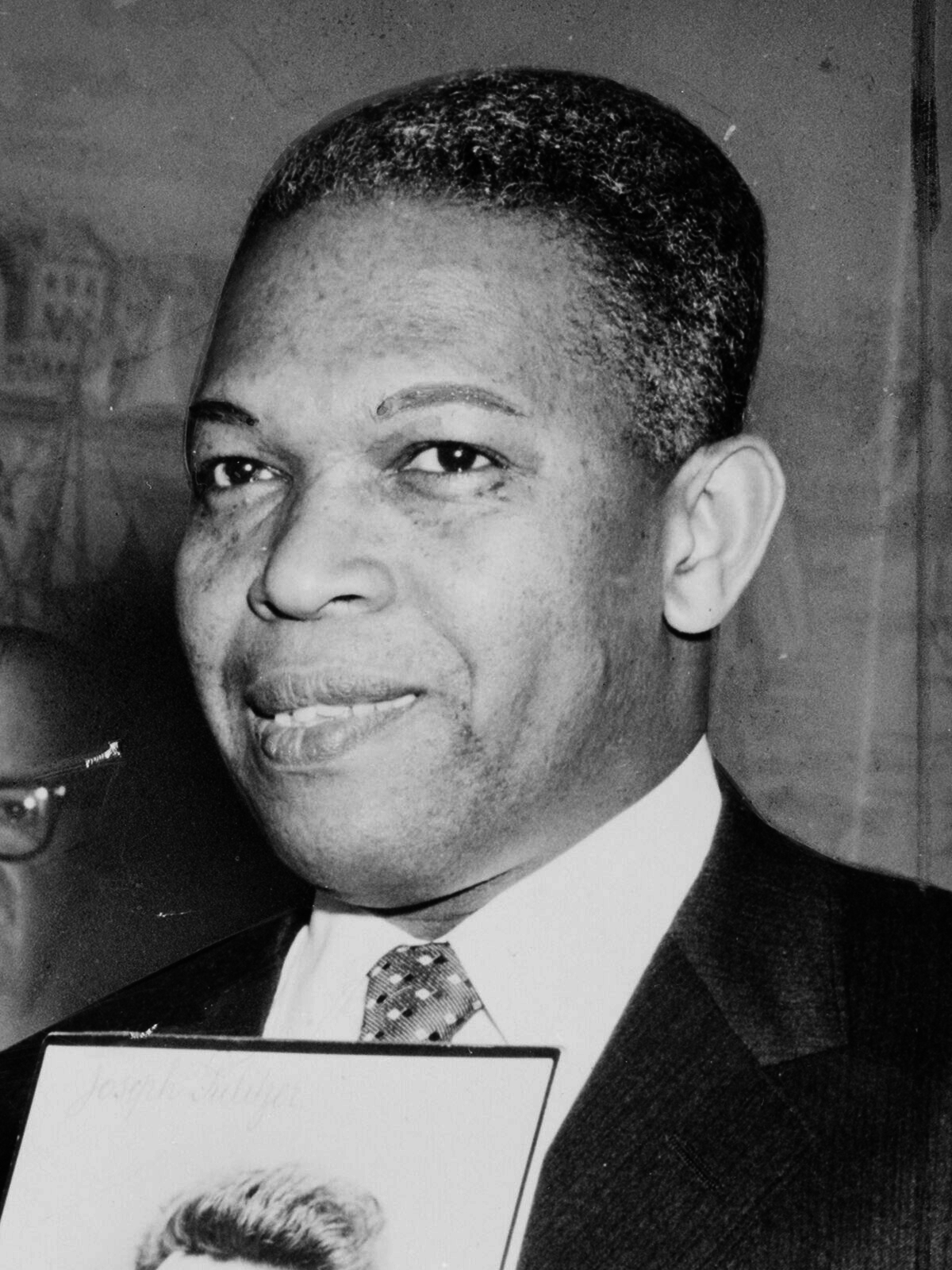
- Jack in 1956

Borough President of Manhattan
- In office January 1, 1954 – April 22, 1960
- Preceded by: Robert F. Wagner Jr.
- Succeeded by: Edward R. Dudley

Member of the New York State Assembly
- In office February 20, 1968 – April 24, 1972
- Preceded by: Jose Ramos-Lopez
- Succeeded by: Jesse Gray
- Constituency: 70th district
- In office January 1, 1941 – December 31, 1953
- Preceded by: Oscar Garcia Rivera
- Succeeded by: Kenneth M. Phipps
- Constituency: 17th district (1941–1944); 14th district (1945–1953)

Personal details
- Born: December 29, 1906 Saint Lucia
- Died: December 19, 1986 (aged 79) Manhattan, New York, U.S.
- Party: Democratic

Hulan Edwin Jack (December 29, 1906 – December 19, 1986) was a Saint Lucian-born New York politician who in 1954 became the highest ranking Caribbean American municipal official up until that time, when he was elected Borough President of Manhattan.

== Early life ==
Jack was born on December 29, 1906, in Saint Lucia, and spent his early years in British Guiana before emigrating to the United States. His father was a minister in the African Orthodox Church. The young Hulan worked as a janitor at a paper box factory, eventually rising to become a vice president of the firm.

He went on to become active in politics with Tammany Hall, winning several elections to the New York State Assembly, representing parts of Harlem in the 163rd, 164th, 165th, 166th, 167th, 168th and 169th New York State Legislatures from 1941 to 1953. As a legislator, he attempted unsuccessfully to pass legislation that would block the racial segregation in New York State public schools and in the sale of property.

== Borough President ==
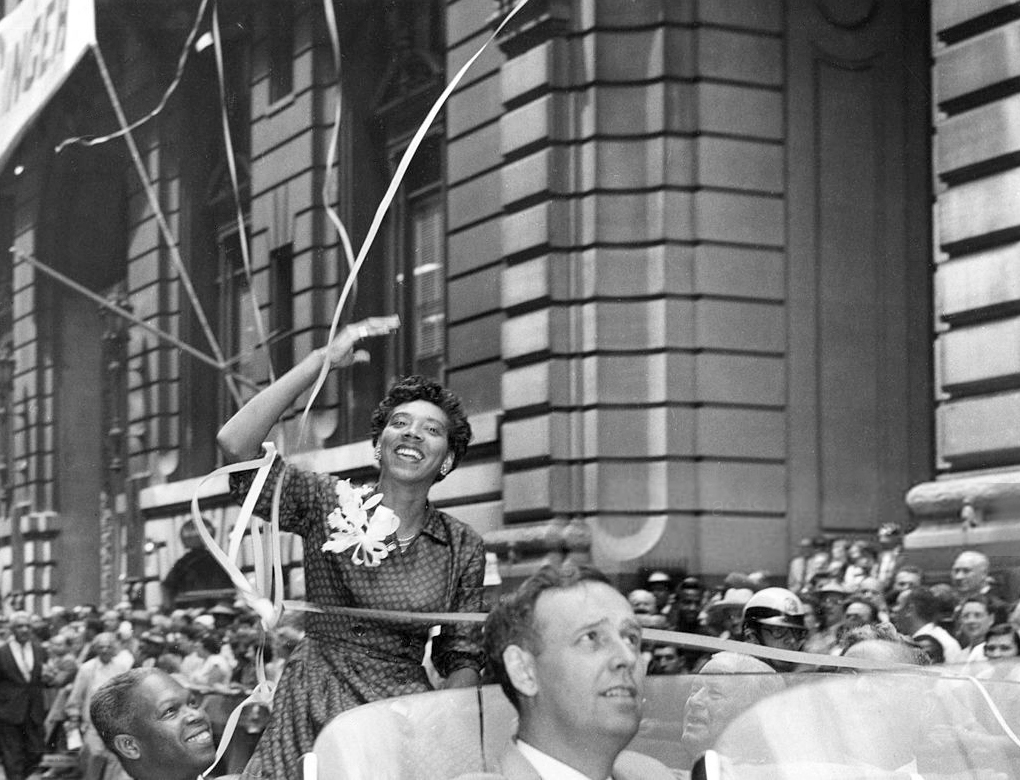
Hulan Jack, lower left, riding in a car with tennis star Althea Gibson in a ticker tape parade in New York after she won Wimbledon in 1957

In November 1953, Jack was elected Borough President of Manhattan, making him one of the nation's most important African-American elected officials.

In 1956, Jack was the featured speaker at an event called "Interracial Sunday" at Loyola University New Orleans. This caused a major controversy, and Emile Wagner, one of the founders of the New Orleans White Citizens Council, obtained material from the House Unamerican Activities Committee which suggested that Jack was a former member of subversive organizations. Jack denied the charges, accusing the White Citizens Council of a "rearguard action to disobey the decision handed-down by the Supreme Court on desegregation in schools." New York City Mayor Robert F. Wagner defended Jack, calling him "the highest grade of American that I know of."

In 1959, Jack was indicted for allowing a friend, Sidney Ungar, to pay a $4,400 bill for the remodeling of his apartment. It was charged that Ungar, a real estate developer, hoped to obtain a contract from the city in return for the favor, even though Jack voted against granting Ungar the contract. Jack was tried twice; the first trial ended with a hung jury, and in the second trial, the jury found him guilty of accepting the gift and of then conspiring to hide it. On January 16, 1961, Jack was sentenced to a suspended one-year term in prison, which had the effect of automatically removing him from the office of Borough President. Charles Rangel later stated, “He got screwed. He went to Mass every morning, and Jesus left his ass holding the bag.” He was succeeded in the Borough Presidents office by Edward R. Dudley.

== Return to Assembly ==
Jack was elected a member of the State Assembly from 1968 to 1972, representing the 70th District in the 177th, 178th and 179th New York State Legislatures. In 1972, Jack was convicted of extortion, along with five others. They were trying to force shop owners to carry a line of products manufactured by a company owned by Jack. He received a three-month prison term and a $5,000 fine. He appealed to the U.S. Supreme Court, which denied his appeal.

== LaRouche movement ==
Jack became involved with the LaRouche movement, acting as a consultant to the 1980 presidential campaign of Lyndon LaRouche. The LaRouche publishing house, New Benjamin Franklin House, published Jack's autobiography, Fifty Years a Democrat. Jack and LaRouche founded the Committee for a New Africa Policy, which lobbied for short term aid and long-term infrastructure development for Africa. In 1984, Jack became a founding member and board member of the LaRouche-affiliated Schiller Institute.

== Death ==
Jack died of cancer on December 19, 1986, in St. Luke's Hospital in Manhattan. He belonged to the Catholic Church. He was 79.

== Works ==
- Jack, Hulan Fifty Years a Democrat:The Autobiography of Hulan Jack New Benjamin Franklin House New York, NY 1983

New York State Assembly
Preceded by Oscar Garcia Rivera	New York State Assembly; New York County, 17th District; 1941–1944	Succeeded by District abolished
Preceded by Warren J. McCarron	New York State Assembly; New York County, 14th District; 1945–1953	Succeeded by Kenneth M. Phipps
Preceded by Jose Ramos-Lopez	New York State Assembly; 70th District; 1968–1972	Succeeded by Jesse Gray
Political offices
Preceded by Robert F. Wagner, Jr.	Borough President of Manhattan; 1954–1961	Succeeded by Edward R. Dudley
