= Albert M. Cole =

American politician

Albert Cole
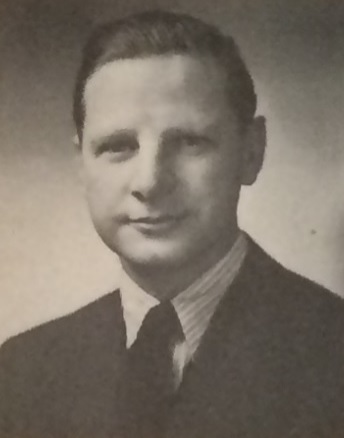

Administrator of the Housing and Home Finance Agency
- In office March 11, 1953 – January 13, 1959
- President: Dwight D. Eisenhower
- Preceded by: Raymond Foley
- Succeeded by: Norman P. Mason

Member of the U.S. House of Representatives from Kansas's 1st district
- In office January 3, 1945 – January 3, 1953
- Preceded by: William P. Lambertson
- Succeeded by: Howard Miller

Personal details
- Born: Albert McDonald Cole; October 13, 1901 Moberly, Missouri, U.S.
- Died: June 5, 1994 (aged 92) Washington, D.C., U.S.
- Party: Republican
- Education: Washburn University (BA); University of Chicago (JD)

Albert McDonald Cole (October 13, 1901 – June 5, 1994) was a U.S. representative from Kansas.

Born in Moberly, Missouri, Cole moved to Topeka, Kansas, in 1909. He attended the grade schools of Topeka, Kansas, Sabetha (Kansas) High School, and Washburn University, in Topeka. He earned his J.D. at University of Chicago Law School in 1925. He was admitted to the bar in 1926 and commenced practice in Holton, Kansas.

Cole served as county attorney of Jackson County 1927–1931. He served as member and president of the Holton School Board 1931–1943. He served as member of the Kansas Senate 1941–1945.

1954 interview

Cole was elected as a Republican to the Seventy-ninth and to the three succeeding Congresses (January 3, 1945 – January 3, 1953). He was an unsuccessful candidate for reelection in 1952 to the Eighty-third Congress. He then served as administrator for the Housing and Home Finance Agency, (now the United States Department of Housing and Urban Development) Washington, D.C., from March 1953 to January 1959. He was vice president of Reynolds Aluminum Service Corp. from 1959 to 1961, and president, Reynolds Metals Development Corp. from 1961 to 1967, and director from 1967 to 1970. Afterwards, Cole practiced law in Washington, D.C., from 1967 to 1990.

Cole was a resident of Washington, D.C., until his death there on June 5, 1994, at the age of 92.

U.S. House of Representatives
Preceded by William P. Lambertson	Member of the U.S. House of Representatives from Kansas's 1st congressional district 1945–1953	Succeeded by Howard Miller
Political offices
Preceded by Raymond Foley	Administrator of the Housing and Home Finance Agency; 1953–1959	Succeeded by Norman P. Mason
