= Constance Baker Motley =

American judge and politician (1921–2005)

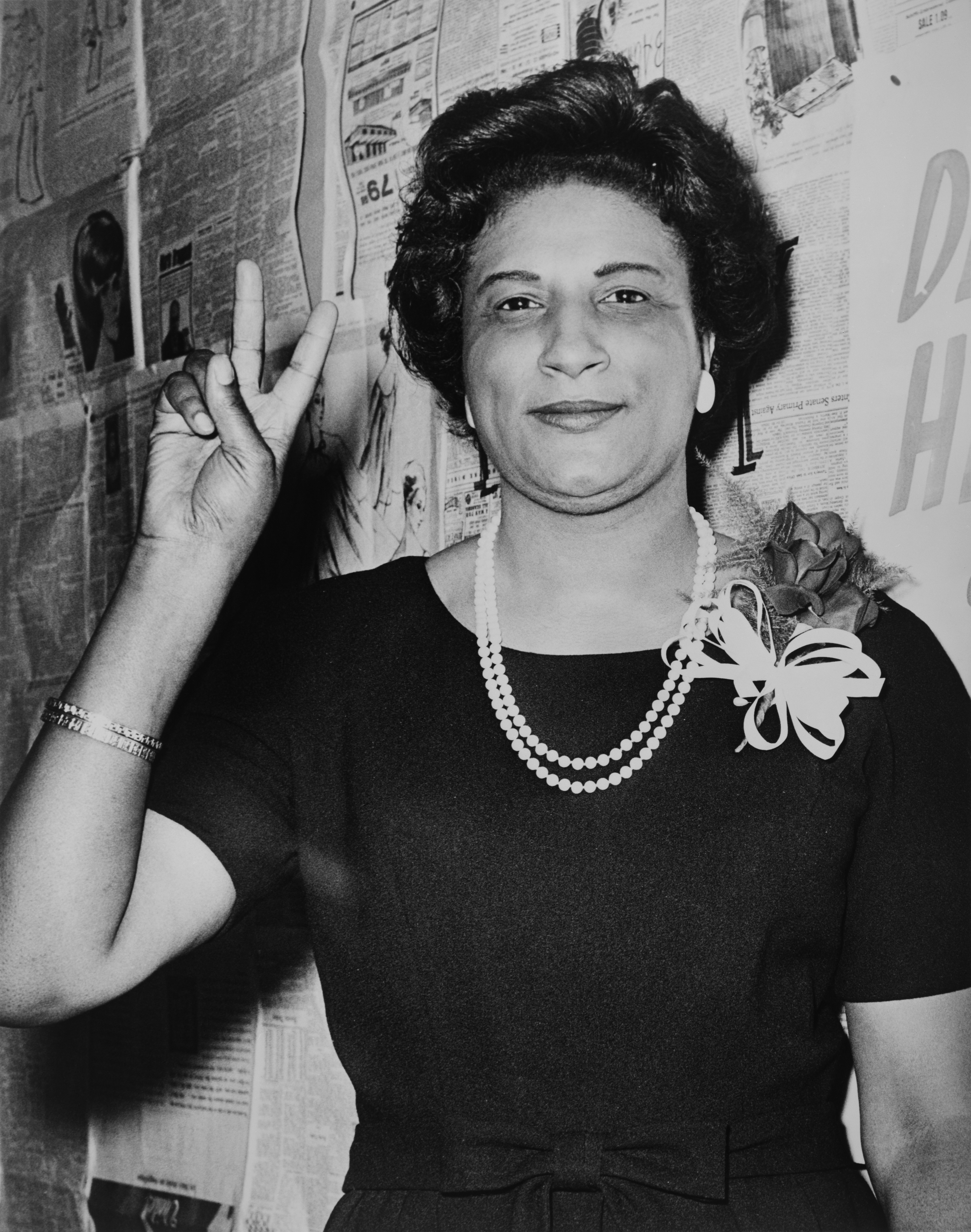
- Motley in 1964

Senior Judge of the United States District Court for the Southern District of New York
- In office September 30, 1986 – September 28, 2005

Chief Judge of the United States District Court for the Southern District of New York
- In office May 31, 1982 – September 30, 1986
- Preceded by: Lloyd Francis MacMahon
- Succeeded by: Charles L. Brieant

Judge of the United States District Court for the Southern District of New York
- In office August 30, 1966 – September 30, 1986
- Appointed by: Lyndon B. Johnson
- Preceded by: Archie Owen Dawson
- Succeeded by: Kimba Wood

Borough President of Manhattan
- In office February 23, 1965 – August 30, 1966
- Preceded by: Edward R. Dudley
- Succeeded by: Percy Sutton

Member of the New York Senate from the 21st district
- In office February 4, 1964 – February 23, 1965
- Preceded by: James Lopez Watson
- Succeeded by: Jeremiah B. Bloom

Personal details
- Born: Constance Baker; September 14, 1921 New Haven, Connecticut, U.S.
- Died: September 28, 2005 (aged 84) New York City, U.S.
- Party: Democratic
- Spouse: Joel Motley Jr. (m. 1946)
- Children: 1
- Education: New York University (BA); Columbia University (LLB)

Constance Baker Motley (née Baker; September 14, 1921 – September 28, 2005) was an American jurist and politician who served as a Judge of the United States District Court for the Southern District of New York. A key strategist of the civil rights movement, she was state senator, and Borough President of Manhattan in New York City before becoming a United States federal judge.

She obtained a role with the NAACP Legal Defense and Educational Fund as a staff attorney in 1946 after receiving her law degree, and continued her work with the organization for more than twenty years.

She was the first Black woman to argue at the Supreme Court and argued 10 landmark civil rights cases, winning nine. She was a law clerk to Thurgood Marshall, aiding him in the case Brown v. Board of Education. Motley was also the first Caribbean-American woman appointed to the federal judiciary, serving as a United States district judge of the United States District Court for the Southern District of New York.

In 1965, Motley was elected President of the Borough of Manhattan to fill a one-year vacancy. She was the first woman to hold the office. As president, she authored a revitalization plan for Harlem and East Harlem, successfully fighting for $700,000 to improve these and other underserved areas of the city.

== Early life ==
Constance Baker was born on September 14, 1921, in New Haven, Connecticut, the ninth of twelve children. Her parents, Rachel Huggins and McCullough Alva Baker, were immigrants from the Caribbean Island Nevis. Before coming to the United States, Rachel worked as a seamstress and a teacher while McCullough worked as a cobbler. After they immigrated, her mother served as a domestic worker, and her father worked as a chef for different Yale University student societies, including the secret society Skull and Bones. Motley describes her parents' education as being equivalent "to the tenth grade in the States". Her mother, Rachel Baker, served as a community activist. She founded the New Haven NAACP.

At 15, she read works by James Weldon Johnson and W.E.B. DuBois, which inspired her interest in Black history. She met a minister who taught classes in Black history that focused her attention on civil rights and the underrepresentation of black lawyers.

=== Education ===
While in high school, Motley became president of the New Haven Negro Youth Council and was secretary of the New Haven Adult Community Council. In 1939, she graduated with honors from Hillhouse High School. Although she had already formed a desire to practice law, Motley lacked the means to attend college, and instead went to work for the National Youth Administration. She also continued her involvement in community activities. Through this work she encountered local businessman and philanthropist Clarence W. Blakeslee, who, after hearing Motley speak at a New Haven community center, offered to pay for her education. With his financial help, she started college at Fisk University, a historically black college in Nashville, Tennessee, but after one year, she transferred to New York University, where she graduated with a Bachelor of Arts degree in economics in 1943. She received her Bachelor of Laws in 1946 from Columbia Law School.

In October 1945, during her second year at Columbia Law School, future United States Supreme Court Associate Justice Thurgood Marshall hired her as a law clerk. She was assigned to work on court martial cases that were filed after World War II.

== Civil rights work ==
Motley is widely acknowledged as a major figure in the Civil Rights Movement, especially its legal battles. After graduating from Columbia's Law School in 1946, she was hired by the NAACP Legal Defense and Educational Fund (LDF) as a civil rights lawyer. As the fund's first female attorney, she became Associate Counsel to the LDF, making her a lead trial attorney in a number of early and significant civil rights cases including representing Martin Luther King Jr., the Freedom Riders, and the Birmingham Children Marchers. She visited Rev. Martin Luther King Jr. while he sat in jail, as well as spent a night with civil rights activist Medgar Evers under armed guard.

In 1950, she wrote the original complaint in the case of Brown v. Board of Education. The first African-American woman to argue a case before the U.S. Supreme Court, in Meredith v. Fair she won James Meredith's case, resulting in him being the first black student to attend the University of Mississippi, in 1962.

Motley was successful in nine of the ten cases she argued before the Supreme Court. The tenth decision, regarding jury composition, was eventually overruled in her favor. She was otherwise a key legal strategist in the civil rights movement, helping to desegregate Southern schools, buses, and lunch counters.

Beyond her work with LDF, Motley continued her civil rights work as an elected official. In 1964, she was elected to the New York State Senate and devoted much of her time to advocate for housing equality for majority-Black and Latino, low-income tenants. She also endorsed urban renewal projects and looked to improve the neighborhoods in New York City that needed aid.

== Political and judicial career ==
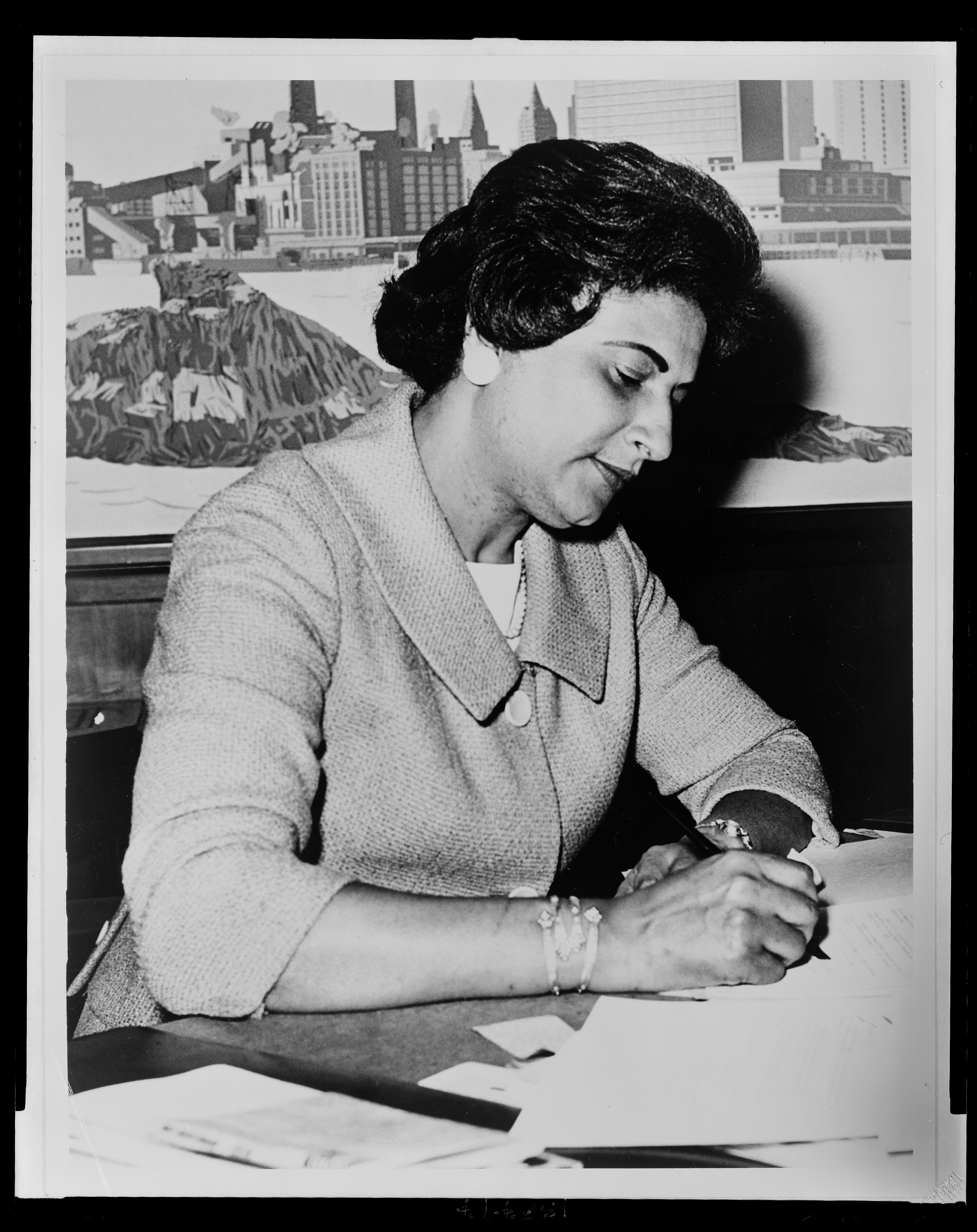
Motley, newly elected as Manhattan Borough President

Motley was elected on February 4, 1964, to the New York State Senate (21st district), to fill the vacancy caused by the election of James Lopez Watson to the New York City Civil Court. She was the first African American woman to sit in the State Senate. She took her seat in the 174th New York State Legislature, was re-elected in November 1964 to the 175th New York State Legislature, and resigned her seat when she was chosen as the first woman as Manhattan Borough President on February 23, 1965, after her predecessor was elected to a state judicial position. In November 1965, she was elected to a full four-year term. J. Raymond Jones was influential in helping her reach these positions.

== Federal judicial service ==
Motley was nominated by President Lyndon B. Johnson on January 26, 1966, to a seat on the United States District Court for the Southern District of New York vacated by Judge Archie Owen Dawson. Senator James Eastland of Mississippi delayed her confirmation process for seven months. Eastland was in opposition to her past desegregation work including Brown v. Board of Education and Meredith v. Fair. He used his influence as chair of the Senate Judiciary Committee to disrupt Motley's nomination, and went as far as accusing her of being a member of the Communist Party. Despite opposition, she was confirmed by the United States Senate on August 30, 1966, and received her commission the same day, becoming the first African American female federal judge. She served as Chief Judge from 1982 to 1986. She assumed senior status on September 30, 1986. Her service terminated on September 28, 2005, due to her death in New York City.

=== Notable cases as judge ===
Motley was the presiding judge on the case of Blank v. Sullivan & Cromwell, a landmark case for women lawyers. In Blank, the plaintiffs accused a law firm of sex discrimination. Due to the nature of this case and Motley's gender and race, there were calls for her to withdraw from the case assuming she would be biased. In response, she pointed to her history of impartial decisions, sometimes ruling against the plaintiff in discrimination cases.

In Belknap v. Leary, 427 F.2d 496 (2d Cir. 1970), archived from the original on July 28, 2020., another highly publicized case, Motley admonished the New York City police for not providing Vietnam war protesters with adequate protection against violence in the streets.

Motley ruled against the plaintiff in the case of Mullarkey v. Borglum in 1970. This case involved female tenants in New York City arguing that their male landlord was violating their First and Fourteenth Amendment rights. The defendants cited the landlord's overreach of power but failed to detail the landlord's legal failings. Motley ruled in favor of the defendant, rejecting the plaintiffs' claim of sex discrimination and going against her former advocacy for tenants during her time in the New York State Senate.

Motley handed down a breakthrough decision for women in sports reporting in 1978, when she ruled that a female reporter must be allowed into a Major League Baseball locker room. In Ludtke v. Kuhn, Melissa Ludtke filed a lawsuit against Bowie Kuhn, the Major League Baseball Commissioner; the American League President, Lee MacPhail; and three New York City officials over the New York Yankees gendered policy forbidding female sports reporters from entering the Yankees locker room.

== Honors and awards ==
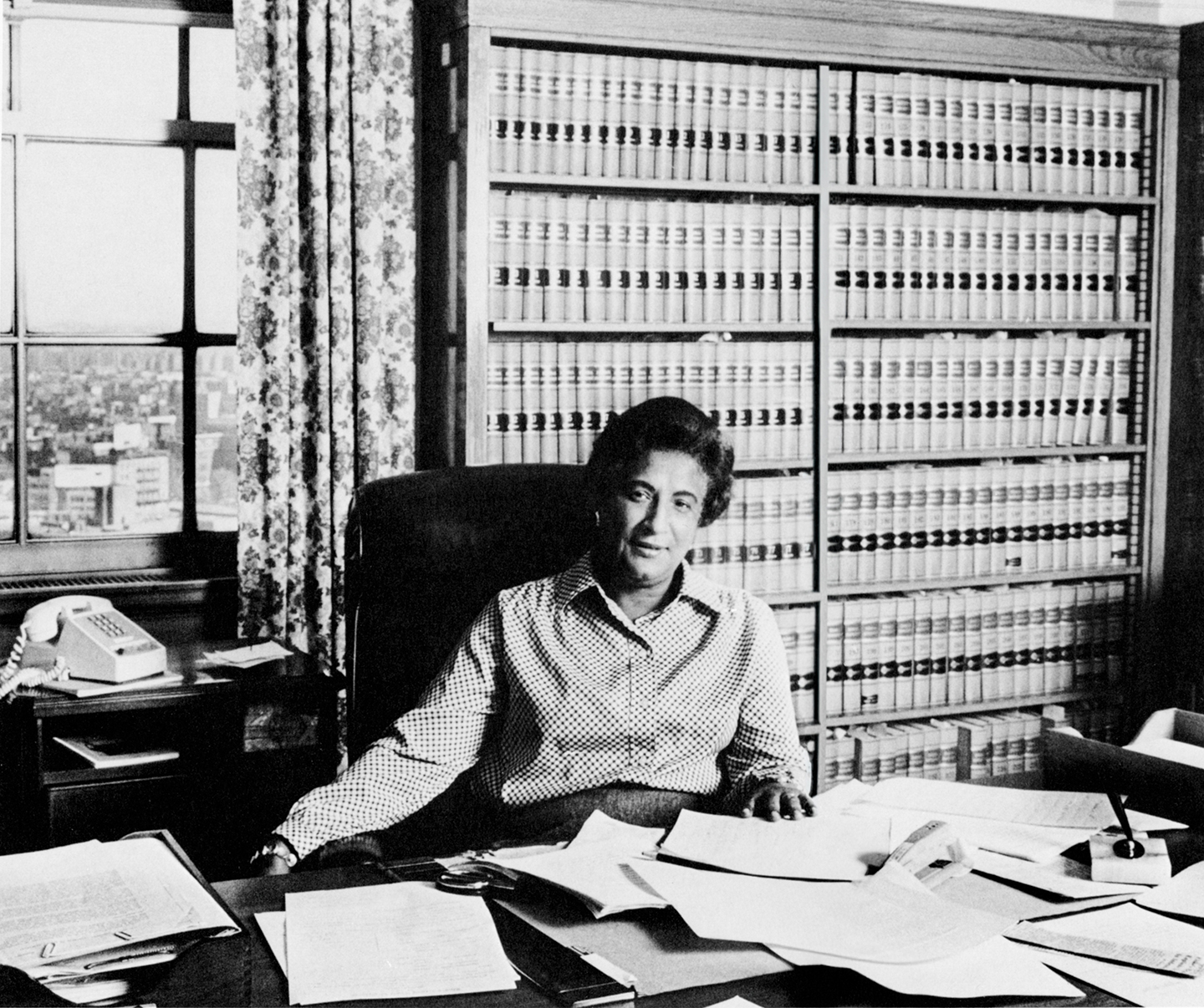
Constance Baker Motley photographed by Lynn Gilbert

Motley received a Candace Award for Distinguished Service from the National Coalition of 100 Black Women in 1984.

In 1993, she was inducted into the National Women's Hall of Fame.

In 2000, Harvard University awarded her an honorary Doctor of Laws.

In 2001, President Bill Clinton awarded her the Presidential Citizens Medal.

The NAACP awarded her the Spingarn Medal, the organization's highest honor, in 2003. Motley was a prominent honorary member of Alpha Kappa Alpha sorority.

In 2006, Motley posthumously received the Congressional Gold Medal from Congress for all of her accomplishments during her lifetime.

In 2011, she was honored posthumously with the 13th Ford Freedom Award for her accomplishments that helped disadvantaged communities.

In 2016, the Chester, Connecticut Land Trust purchased land across from her former second home. The parcel was eventually dedicated as the "Judge Constance Baker Motley Preserve". A small kiosk, picnic area, and trail are available to the public.

On October 6, 2019, her property located in Chester, Connecticut, was designated a site on the Connecticut Freedom Trail. The site is just one of 140 that honor African-Americans throughout the state.

In 2021, the New York City Parks Department renamed the 54th Street Recreation Center in honor of Motley.

The Harlem Historical Society authored a street co-naming resolution honoring Motley for her service as an American civil rights activist, lawyer, judge, state senator, and Harlem resident. The portion of Edgecombe Avenue between 159th and 160th streets was co-named "Constance Baker Motley Place".

== Personal life ==
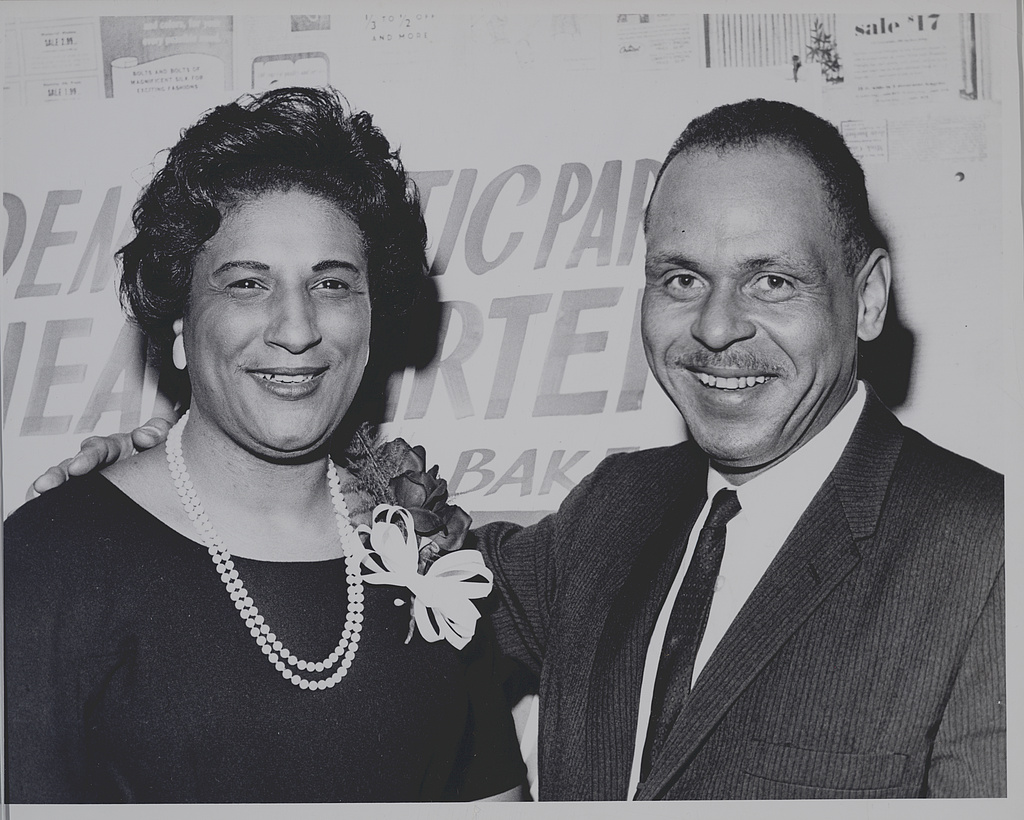
Motley with her husband Joel in 1965

Constance Baker married Joel Motley Jr., a real estate and insurance broker, in 1946 at Saint Luke's Episcopal Church in New Haven, Connecticut. They lived in Harlem, New York City and maintained a second home in Chester, Connecticut from 1965 until her death in 2005.

Baker and Motley were married for 59 years, until her death of congestive heart failure on September 28, 2005, fourteen days after her 84th birthday, at NYU Downtown Hospital in New York City. Her funeral was held at the Connecticut church where she had been married; a public memorial service was held at Riverside Church in Manhattan.

She left one son, Joel Wilson Motley III, co-chairman of Human Rights Watch, and three grandchildren. Her husband Joel died on January 29, 2007, from complications following heart surgery.

During the early twenty-first century, Motley became a part of the Just The Beginning Foundation, a foundation dedicated to preserving African American judges who improve the African American community through their work.

== Legacy ==
During her time as a federal judge for the Southern District of New York, Motley made efforts to reach out to other African-American women in her position. One of the women she reached out to was Judge Anne Elise Thompson who received a personal note from Motley on the day she was appointed to be a judge for the District of New Jersey.

In 2005, the University of Pennsylvania Law School's American Constitution Society (ACS) student chapter began to host National Writing Competitions annually in honor of Constance Baker Motley.

With her work on Ludtke v. Kuhn, Motley became a pivotal figure to Melissa Ludtke. Ludtke published an article in 2018 praising the work that Motley accomplished throughout her life despite the discrimination she experienced.

Judith Heumann, co-founder of the World Institute on Disability, credits Motley with her becoming the first licensed teacher in the state of New York who used a wheelchair.

U.S. Vice President Kamala Harris explicitly cites Motley's influence on her own political and law career on her campaign page.

Federal Judge Ketanji Brown Jackson cited Motley as an influence on her own career in a speech accepting President Joe Biden's nomination to become an associate justice of the Supreme Court. Jackson and Motley share the same birthday.

An award-winning biographical documentary, Justice is a Black Woman: The Life and Work of Constance Baker Motley, was broadcast on Connecticut Public Television in 2012. A documentary short, The Trials of Constance Baker Motley, premiered at the Tribeca Film Festival on April 19, 2015.

In 2022, Civil Rights Queen, an "immersive" biography of Motley, was published.

On January 31, 2024, the United States Postal Service issued a commemorative postage stamp to honor Motley. The first day of issue ceremony took place at the Constance Baker Motley Recreation Center in New York City and was presided over by the Honorable Anton Hajjar, member of the U.S. Postal Service Board. This stamp was the 47th in the Black Heritage series of U.S. postage stamps.

== See also ==
- List of African-American federal judges
- List of African-American jurists
- List of first women lawyers and judges in the United States
- List of People on the Postage Stamps of the United States

New York State Senate
Preceded by James Lopez Watson	Member of the New York Senate from the 21st district 1964–1965	Succeeded by Jeremiah B. Bloom
Political offices
Preceded by Edward R. Dudley	Borough President of Manhattan; 1965–1966	Succeeded by Percy Sutton
Legal offices
Preceded by Archie Owen Dawson	Judge of the United States District Court for the Southern District of New York; 1966–1986	Succeeded by Kimba Wood
Preceded by Lloyd Francis MacMahon	Chief Judge of the United States District Court for the Southern District of New York; 1982–1986	Succeeded by Charles L. Brieant
