= National Register of Historic Places listings in Randolph County, Indiana =

Location of Randolph County in Indiana

This is a list of the National Register of Historic Places listings in Randolph County, Indiana.

This is intended to be a complete list of the properties and districts on the National Register of Historic Places in Randolph County, Indiana, United States. Latitude and longitude coordinates are provided for many National Register properties and districts; these locations may be seen together in a map.

There are 14 properties and districts listed on the National Register in the county.

Properties and districts located in incorporated areas display the name of the municipality, while properties and districts in unincorporated areas display the name of their civil township. Properties and districts split between multiple jurisdictions display the names of all jurisdictions.

This National Park Service list is complete through NPS recent listings posted December 12, 2025.

== Current listings ==
	Name on the Register	Image	Date listed	Location	City or town	Description
1	Farmland Downtown Historic District	Farmland Downtown Historic District	September 8, 1994 (#94001124)	Main St. from the alley south of Henry St. to William St. 40°11′27″N 85°07′42″W	Farmland	
2	Fudge Site	Fudge Site	March 21, 2007 (#07000213)	Immediately southwest of the confluence of Sugar Creek and the White River, northwest of Winchester; 40°11′08″N 84°59′27″W	White River Township	
3	William Kerr House	William Kerr House	October 1, 1987 (#87001776)	501 N. Columbia St. 40°12′08″N 84°48′33″W	Union City	Designed by architect George Franklin Barber
4	Raphael Kirshbaum Building	Raphael Kirshbaum Building	May 24, 1990 (#90000813)	Northwestern corner of the junction of Columbia and W. Pearl Sts. 40°11′55″N 84°48′30″W	Union City	
5	Randolph County Infirmary	Randolph County Infirmary	December 3, 2018 (#100003188)	1882 S. U.S. Route 27; 40°08′15″N 84°57′56″W	White River Township	
6	Gen. Asahel Stone Mansion	Gen. Asahel Stone Mansion	March 21, 1979 (#79000040)	201 W. Orange St. 40°09′56″N 84°58′58″W	Winchester	
7	Union City Commercial Historic District	Union City Commercial Historic District	March 12, 1999 (#99000303)	Roughly bounded by W. Oak, N. Union, W. Smith, and N. Howard Sts. 40°11′56″N 84°48′30″W	Union City	
8	Union City Passenger Depot	Union City Passenger Depot	May 19, 1983 (#83000145)	Howard St. 40°11′52″N 84°48′36″W	Union City	
9	Union City Public Library	Union City Public Library	June 22, 2004 (#04000631)	408 N. Columbia St. 40°12′06″N 84°48′30″W	Union City	
10	Union City School	Union City School	June 24, 2010 (#10000379)	310 N. Walnut St. 40°11′58″N 84°48′49″W	Union City	
11	Ward Township District No. 5 School	Ward Township District No. 5 School	June 12, 2017 (#100001064)	Northwestern corner of E700N and N100E; 40°16′00″N 84°57′27″W	Ward Township	
12	Winchester Courthouse Square Historic District	Winchester Courthouse Square Historic District	August 9, 2001 (#01000405)	Roughly bounded by North St. and the alleys located to the east of Main St. 40°10′27″N 84°58′20″W	Winchester	
13	Winchester Residential Historic District	Winchester Residential Historic District	March 21, 2011 (#11000123)	Roughly both sides of Washington and Franklin Sts. from Main St. to Greenville Ave. and both sides of Meridian and Main Sts. 40°10′20″N 84°58′44″W	Winchester	
14	Windsor Mound	Windsor Mound	March 31, 2010 (#10000128)	12102 W. Windsor Rd., south of Parker City; 40°09′24″N 85°12′24″W	Stoney Creek Township	

== See also ==
- List of National Historic Landmarks in Indiana
- National Register of Historic Places listings in Indiana
- Listings in neighboring counties: Darke (OH), Delaware, Henry, Jay, Wayne
- List of Indiana state historical markers in Randolph County
