= List of Indiana state historical markers in Randolph County =

Location of Randolph County in Indiana

This is a list of the Indiana state historical markers in Randolph County.

This is intended to be a complete list of the official state historical markers placed in Randolph County, Indiana, United States by the Indiana Historical Bureau. The locations of the historical markers and their latitude and longitude coordinates are included below when available, along with their names, years of placement, and topics as recorded by the Historical Bureau. There are 5 historical markers located in Randolph County.

== Historical markers ==
Marker title	Image	Year placed	Location	Topics
Farmland Downtown Historic District		2005	106 N. Main Street in Farmland; 40°11′17″N 85°7′39″W	Historic District, Neighborhoods, and Towns, Buildings and Architecture, Agriculture, Transportation
Lee L. Driver		2009	Driver Middle School, 130 S. County Road 100E near Winchester; 40°10′19″N 84°57′27″W	Education and libraries
Randolph County Quakers		2010	124 E. Washington St. (SR 32), Winchester; 40°10′20.9″N 84°58′47.9″W	
Amanda Way		2013	West Washington St. (SR 32) just west of Meridian St., Winchester; 40°10′21.4″N 84°59′0.8″W	Women's Suffrage
Union Literary Institute		2016	8605 East 600 South, Union City 40°04′38″N 84°48′59″W	Racially integrated school

== See also ==
- List of Indiana state historical markers
- National Register of Historic Places listings in Randolph County, Indiana
