= Winchester Historic District =

Winchester Historic District may refer to:

- Winchester Historic District (Winchester, Illinois)
- Winchester Residential Historic District, Winchester, Indiana, listed on the National Register of Historic Places in Randolph County, Indiana
- Winchester Historic District (Winchester, Virginia)
