= Engine House No. 3 (Fort Wayne, Indiana) =

- U.S. National Register of Historic Places
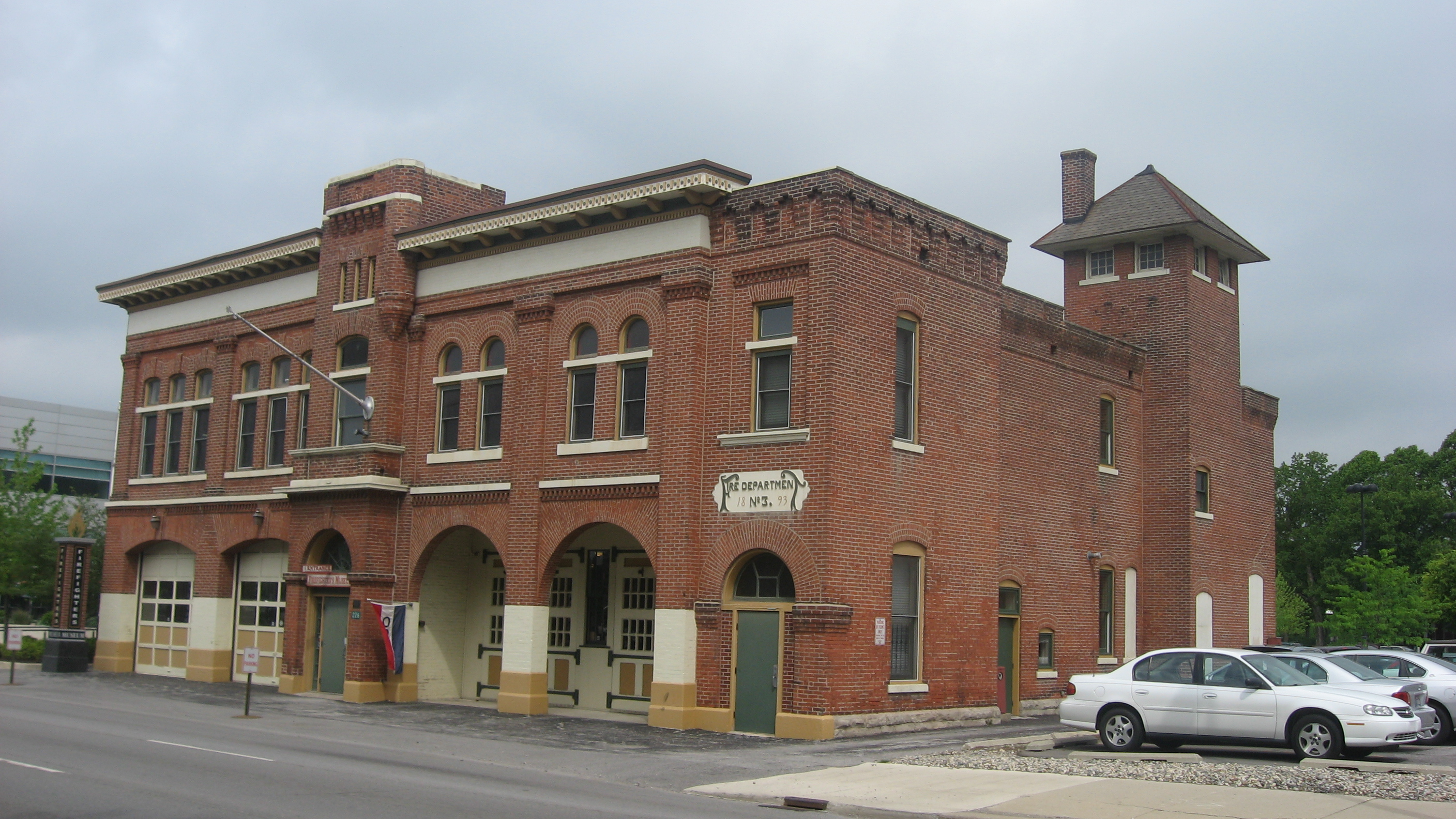
- Engine House No. 3, May 2012

- Location within Indiana Location within the United States
- Location: 226 West Washington Boulevard, Fort Wayne, Indiana
- Coordinates: 41°4′38″N 85°8′30″W
- Area: 1 acre (0.40 ha)
- Built: 1893, 1907
- Architect: Wing & Mahurin
- Architectural style: Romanesque
- NRHP reference No.: 79003772
- Added to NRHP: July 27, 1979

Engine House No. 3 is a historic fire station located in downtown Fort Wayne, Indiana. It was designed by the architectural firm Wing & Mahurin, with the original section built in 1893 and an addition built in 1907. It is a two-story, Romanesque Revival style red brick building. The building houses the Fort Wayne Firefighters Museum.

It was added to the National Register of Historic Places on July 27, 1979.

== See also ==
- Fort Wayne Fire Department
- National Register of Historic Places listings in Allen County, Indiana
- List of museums in Indiana
