= Wing & Mahurin =

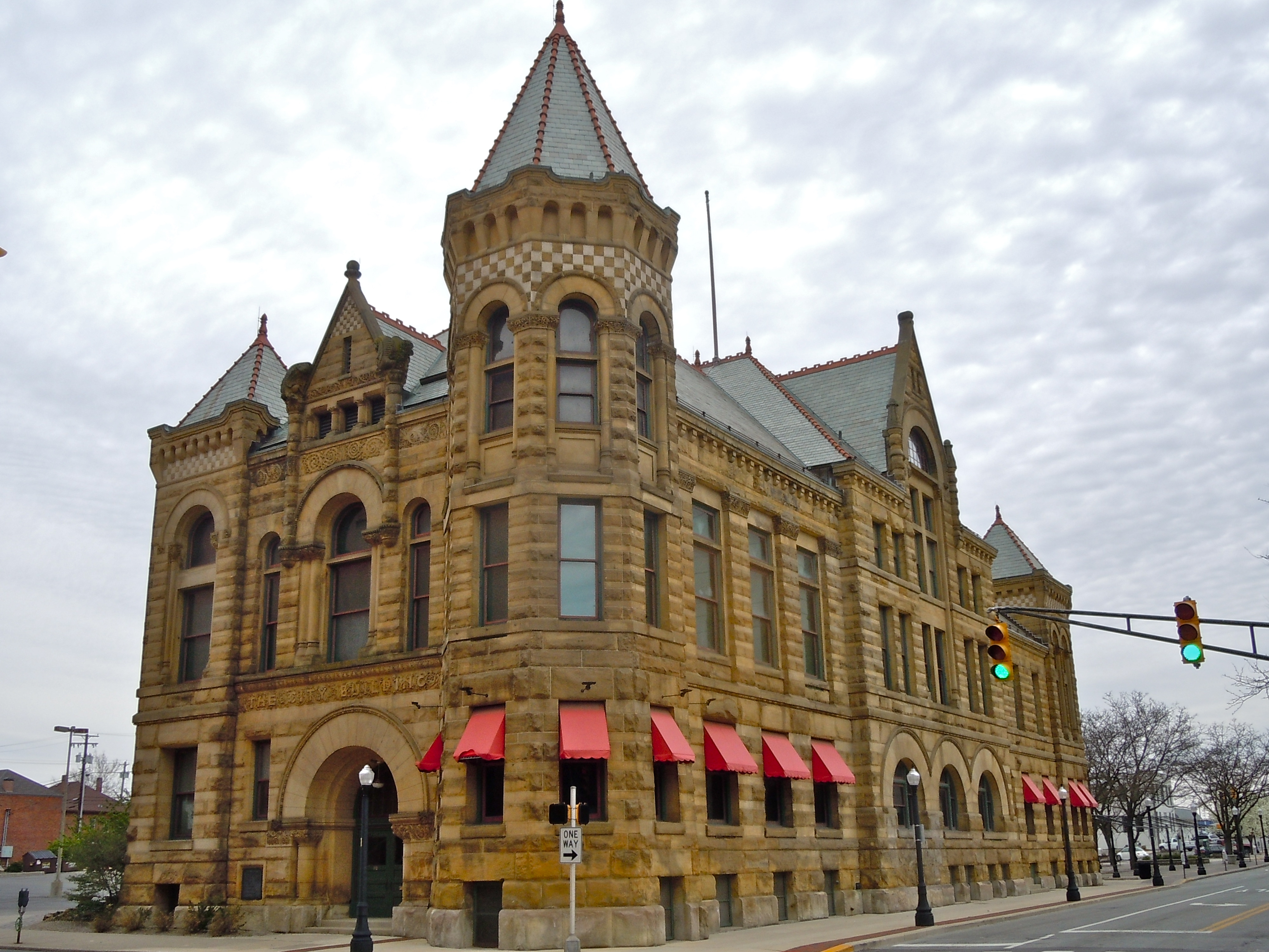
Fort Wayne City Hall

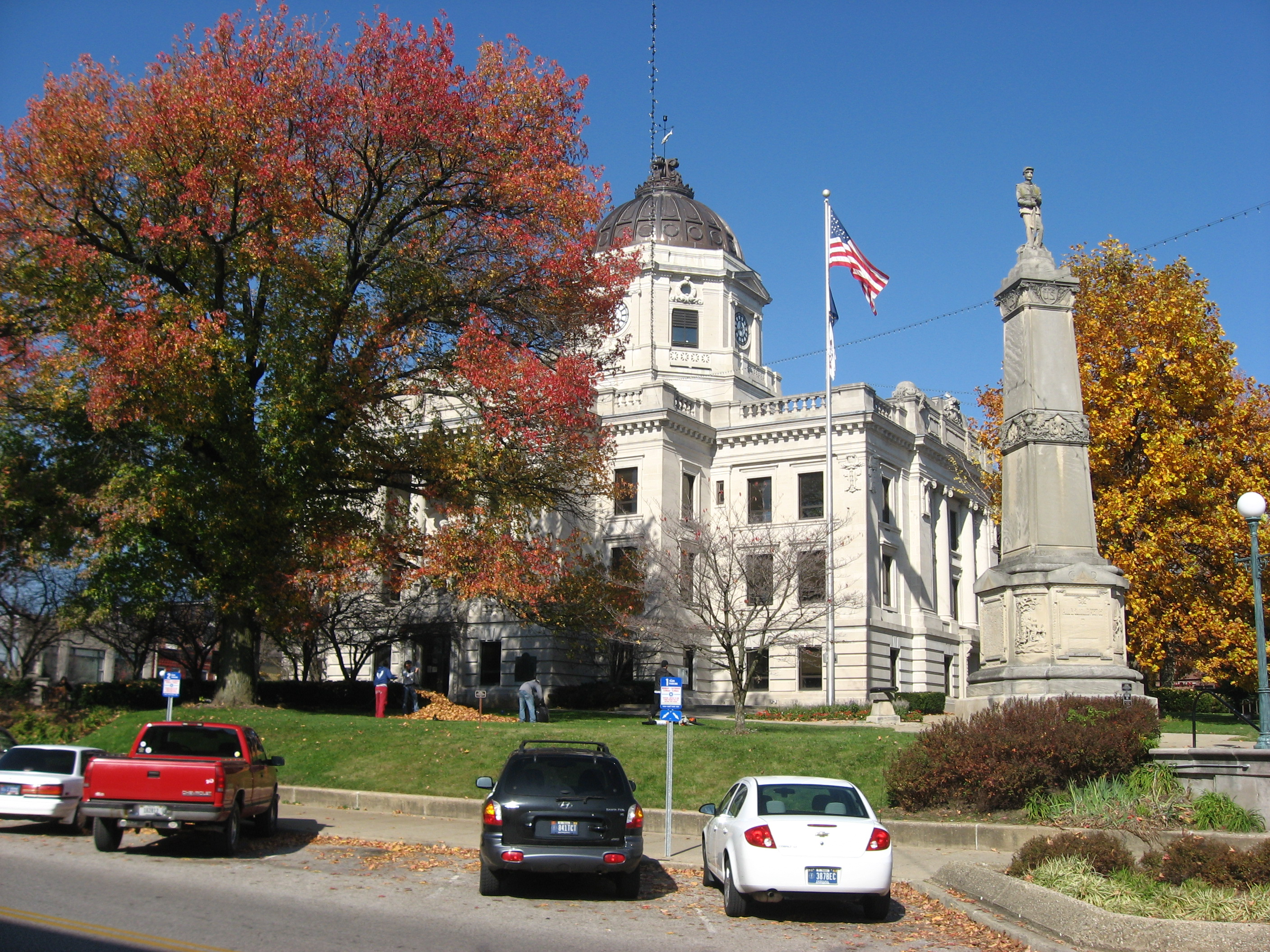
Monroe County Courthouse

Wing & Mahurin was an architectural firm of Fort Wayne, Indiana. Its principal partners were John F. Wing (1852–1947) and Marshall S. Mahurin (1857–1939), who were partners until 1907. Together with Guy M. Mahurin (1877–1941) they worked also as Mahurin & Mahurin.

A number of its works are listed on the U.S. National Register of Historic Places.

Works by these architects include (with attribution):

- Allen County Orphans' Home, Fort Wayne, Indiana
- John H. Bass Mansion, aka "Brookside," Fort Wayne, Indiana (Wing & Mahurin), NRHP-listed
- Beech Grove Cemetery, 1400 W. Kilgore Ave. Muncie, IN (Mahurin, Marshall S., et al.), NRHP-listed
- Hon. R. C. Bell Residence, Fort Wayne, Indiana
- Dr. D. S. Brown Residence, Fort Wayne, Indiana
- Carnegie Library (Muncie, Indiana) (Wing & Mahurin)
- Central Fire Station, Fort Wayne, Indiana
- Defiance Public Library, 320 Fort St. Defiance, Ohio (Mahurin, M.S.), NRHP-listed
- Charles Dugan House, 420 W. Monroe St. Decatur, Indiana (Wing & Mahurin), NRHP-listed
- Engine House No. 3, 226 W. Washington Blvd., Fort Wayne, Indiana (Wing & Mahurin), NRHP-listed
- Fort Wayne City Hall, Fort Wayne, Indianabuilt 1893, Richardsonian Romanesque-style government building, (John F. Wing and Marshall S. Mahurin), NRHP-listed
- The Fort Wayne Saengerbund Building, Fort Wayne, Indiana
- Greenfield High School, Greenfield, Indiana
- Hancock County Courthouse, Greenfield, Indiana
- The Humphrey & Hughes Block, Van Wert, Ohio
- Indiana State School for Feeble-Minded Children, Fort Wayne, Indiana
- Kokomo City Building, 221 W. Walnut St. Kokomo, IN (Wing & Mahurin), NRHP-listed
- Kosciusko County Infirmary, Warsaw, Indiana
- Lindenwood Cemetery Receiving Vault and Crematory (also a number of private vaults), Fort Wayne, Indiana
- Marshall S. Mahuin Residence, Fort Wayne, Indiana
- Marshall County Infirmary, 10924 Lincoln Highway, Plymouth, Indiana (Wing & Mahurin), NRHP-listed
- Masonic Temple, Wabash, Indiana
- The McDonald & Taylor Fire-Proof Building, Fort Wayne, Indiana
- Monroe County Courthouse, Courthouse Sq. Bloomington, IN (Wing & Guy M. Mahurin), NRHP-listed
- Monroe County Infirmary, Bloomington, Indiana
- Muncie Public Library, 301 E. Jackson St. Muncie, IN (Mahurin, Marshall S.), NRHP-listed
- Old People's Home, Avilla, Indiana
- Ottawa County Courthouse, W. 4th and Madison Sts. Port Clinton, OH (Wing & Mahurin), NRHP-listed
- J. S. Peabody Residence, Columbia City, Indiana
- Saint Paul's Evangelical Lutheran Church, 1126 S. Barr St., Fort Wayne, Indiana (Wing & Mahurin), NRHP-listed
- Starke County Courthouse, built 1897, Courthouse Sq. Knox, IN (Wing & Mahurin; Caldwell & Drake), NRHP-listed
- Sullivan County Poor Home, Sullivan, Indiana
- Union City School, 310 N Walnut St Union City, IN (Mahurin & Mahurin), NRHP-listed
- US Post Office and Courthouse, 1300 W. Harrison St., Fort Wayne, Indiana (Mahurin, Guy), NRHP-listed
- Wabash High School, Wabash, Indiana
- One or more works in West Wabash Historic District, bounded roughly by the Northfolk Southern RR and Union St., Wabash and Miami Sts., Main St., Holliday St. Wabash, IN (Wing & Mahurin), NRHP-listed
- One or more works in Williams–Woodland Park Historic District, roughly bounded by Hoagland and Creighton Aves. and Harrison and Pontiac Sts., Fort Wayne, Indiana (Mahurin, Marshall), NRHP-listed
- White National Bank, Fort Wayne, Indiana
- One or more works in Downtown Auburn Historic District, roughly bounded by E. and W. Fourth, N. and S. Cedar, E. Twelfth, and N. and S. Jackson Sts. Auburn, IN (Mahurin & Mahurin), NRHP-listed
- One or more works in Minnetrista Boulevard Historic District, 400-650 Minnetrista Blvd., Muncie, IN (Marshall S. Mahurin), NRHP-listed
- The Zion's Lutheran Church, Fort Wayne, Indiana
- Thomas & Donna Neshek Residence, Elkhorn, WI (Marshall S. Mahurin)
