= Fort Wayne Fire Department =

Fire Department of the city of Fort Wayne, Indiana

- Fort Wayne Fire Department patch

Operational area
- Country: United States
- State: Indiana
- County: Allen
- City: Fort Wayne
- Coordinates: 41.0809°N 85.1393°W

Agency overview
- Established: 1839
- Annual calls: 29,587(2022)
- Employees: 368(2023)
- Annual budget: $51,014,034(2022)
- Fire chief: Eric Lahey

Facilities and equipment
- Battalions: 4
- Stations: 18
- Engines: 18
- Trucks: 5
- Rescues: 2
- HAZMAT: 1
- Rescue boats: 3

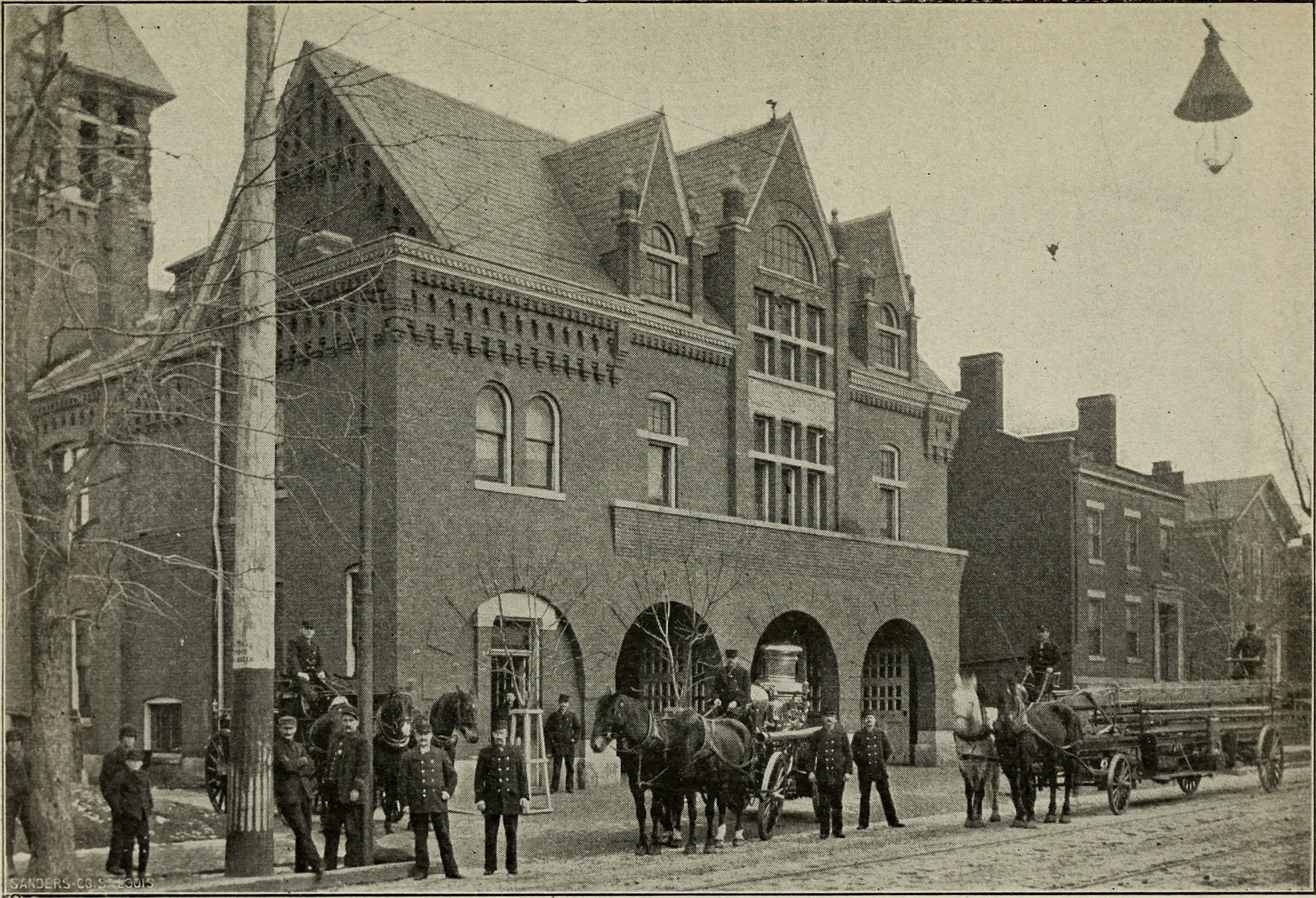
Fort Wayne Fire Department Station No. 2 (1901)

Fort Wayne Fire Department (FWFD) provides fire protection and emergency medical services to the city of Fort Wayne, Indiana.

Fort Wayne Fire Department has an Insurance Services Office (ISO) Public Protection Classification rating of 2. The department operates special operations teams that specialize in dive rescue, hazmat, search and rescue, and wildland firefighting.

Fort Wayne Fire Department currently does not run its own ambulances. Instead, the district receives ambulance services from Three Rivers Ambulance Authority (TRAA), and shares the responsibility of funding it with Allen County. The department is currently planning on taking over the operations of ambulance services for the city of Fort Wayne due to government disagreements over continued shared funding of Three Rivers Ambulance Authority.

== Fire Stations and Apparatus ==
Fort Wayne Fire Department has 18 stations spread throughout the city, as of 2018.

| Fire Station | Address | Engine Company | Ladder Company | Special Units | Supervising Units |
|---|---|---|---|---|---|
| 1 | 419 E Main St. | Engine 1 | Truck 1 | Rescue 1 SCUBA Truck HAZMAT Trailer | Battalion 1 |
| 2 | 2023 Taylor St. | Engine 2 | | | |
| 4 | 4130 Lahmeyer St. | Engine 4 | | | |
| 5 | 5801 Bluffton Rd. | Engine 5 | | SCUBA Water Raft | |
| 6 | 1500 W Coliseum Blvd. | Engine 6 | | | |
| 7 | 1622 Lindenwood Ave. | Engine 7 | | SCUBA Water Raft | |
| 8 | 6035 Rothman Rd. | Engine 8 | | | |
| 9 | 2530 E Pontiac St. | Engine 9 | | | |
| 10 | 3122 N Anthony Blvd. | Engine 10 | | Special Operations Rescue Truck SCUBA Water Raft | Battalion 10 |
| 11 | 405 E Rudisill Blvd. | Engine 11 | | | Battalion 11 |
| 12 | 6901 S Anthony Blvd. | Engine 12 | Truck 12 | Grass Rig (Brush Engine) | |
| 13 | 6727 N Clinton St. | Engine 13 | | Grass Rig (Brush Engine) | Battalion 13 |
| 14 | 2224 Reed Rd. | Engine 14 | Truck 14 | | |
| 15 | 1415 Northland Blvd. | Engine 15 | Truck 15 | | |
| 16 | 11330 Coldwater Rd. | Engine 16 | | | |
| 17 | 1910 Getz Rd. | Engine 17 | | | Battalion 17 |
| 18 | 10805 Liberty Mills Rd. | Engine 18 | | Decon Trailer | |
| 19 | 10116 Covington Rd. | Engine 19 | Truck 19 | | |
