= Defiance Public Library =

Carnegie library in Defiance, Ohio, US

- U.S. National Register of Historic Places
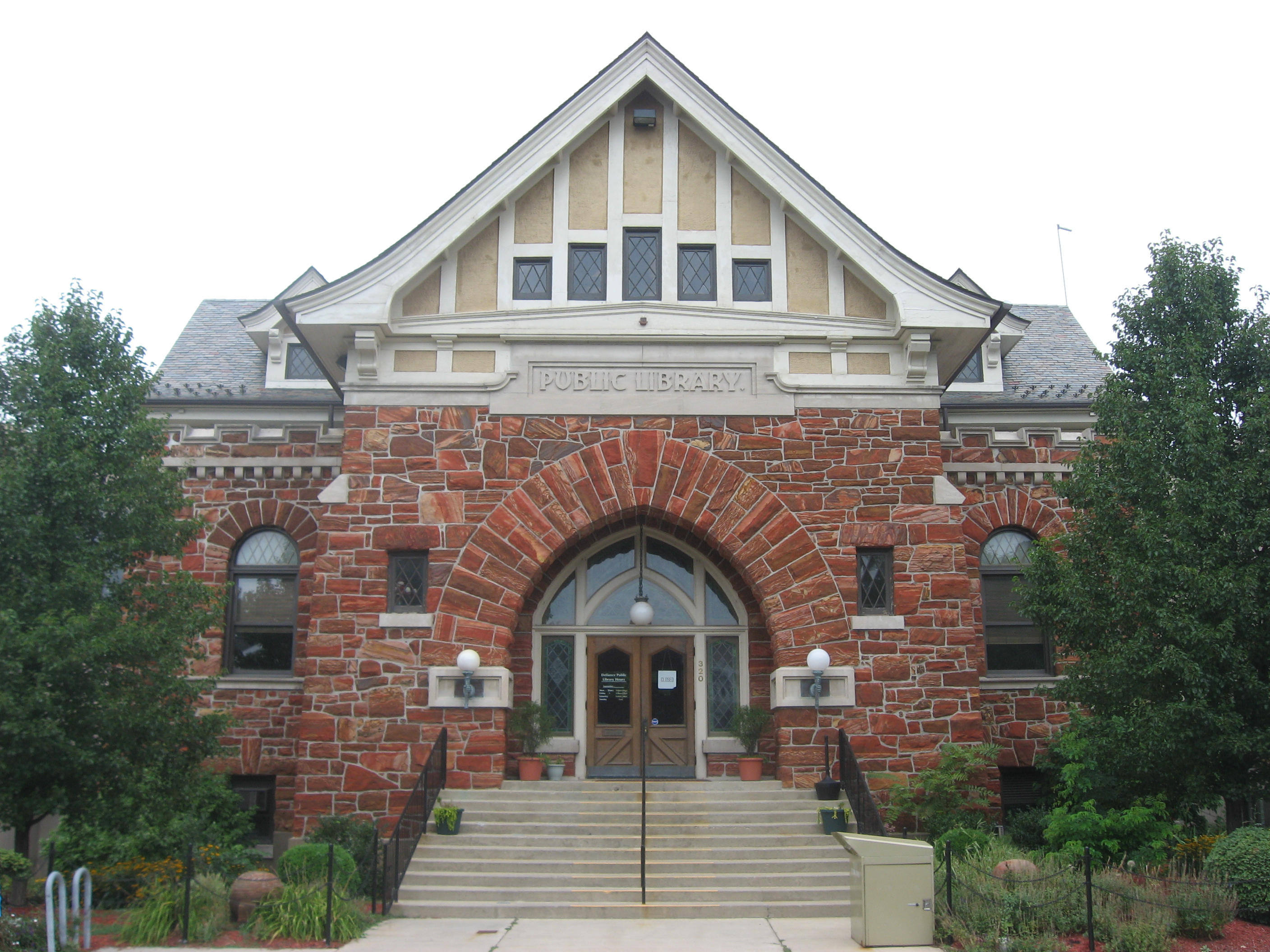

- Location within Ohio Location within the United States
- Location: 320 Fort St., Defiance, Ohio
- Coordinates: 41°17′16″N 84°21′31″W
- Area: less than one acre
- Built: 1904
- Architect: J.F. Wing, M.S. Mahurin
- Architectural style: Tudor Revival, Tudor Gothic
- NRHP reference No.: 85003446
- Added to NRHP: October 31, 1985

The Defiance Public Library is a historic Carnegie library located in Defiance, Ohio. It was built in 1904 with funds from Andrew Carnegie and was designed by architects Wing & Mahurin. The Tudor Revival-style building includes stained glass, a red sandstone façade, and picture windows overlooking the junction the Maumee and Auglaize Rivers and of the Defiance Fort Grounds. The building was listed on the National Register of Historic Places in 1985.

== History ==
The notion of a library like service was first devised by a formation of twenty-five men in 1867, determined to better the intellectual prosperity of the residents in Defiance, Ohio. While these men worked towards furthering the education of the city, official library services were not performed until the 1870s. In the year 1873, these men established what was known as the Defiance Library Association (DLA), which would begin the first ever official library services for the city of Defiance. This association would spend the next few decades providing an assortment of library services, for a summable fee, despite not possessing any sort of solid location for their collection. From this point forward, library services would be provided in a number of various local buildings and businesses for the next thirty years. With a distinct lack of security for the library’s collection, the members of the DLA wrote to the Carnegie Foundation in order to procure the funds to establish a permanent location. In 1904, the DLA was gifted the sum of $22,000 towards the building of the public library’s first permanent residence on the Fort Defiance grounds. Building began immediately and would finish, open for public use on July 4, 1905.
