= Kokomo City Building =

- U.S. National Register of Historic Places
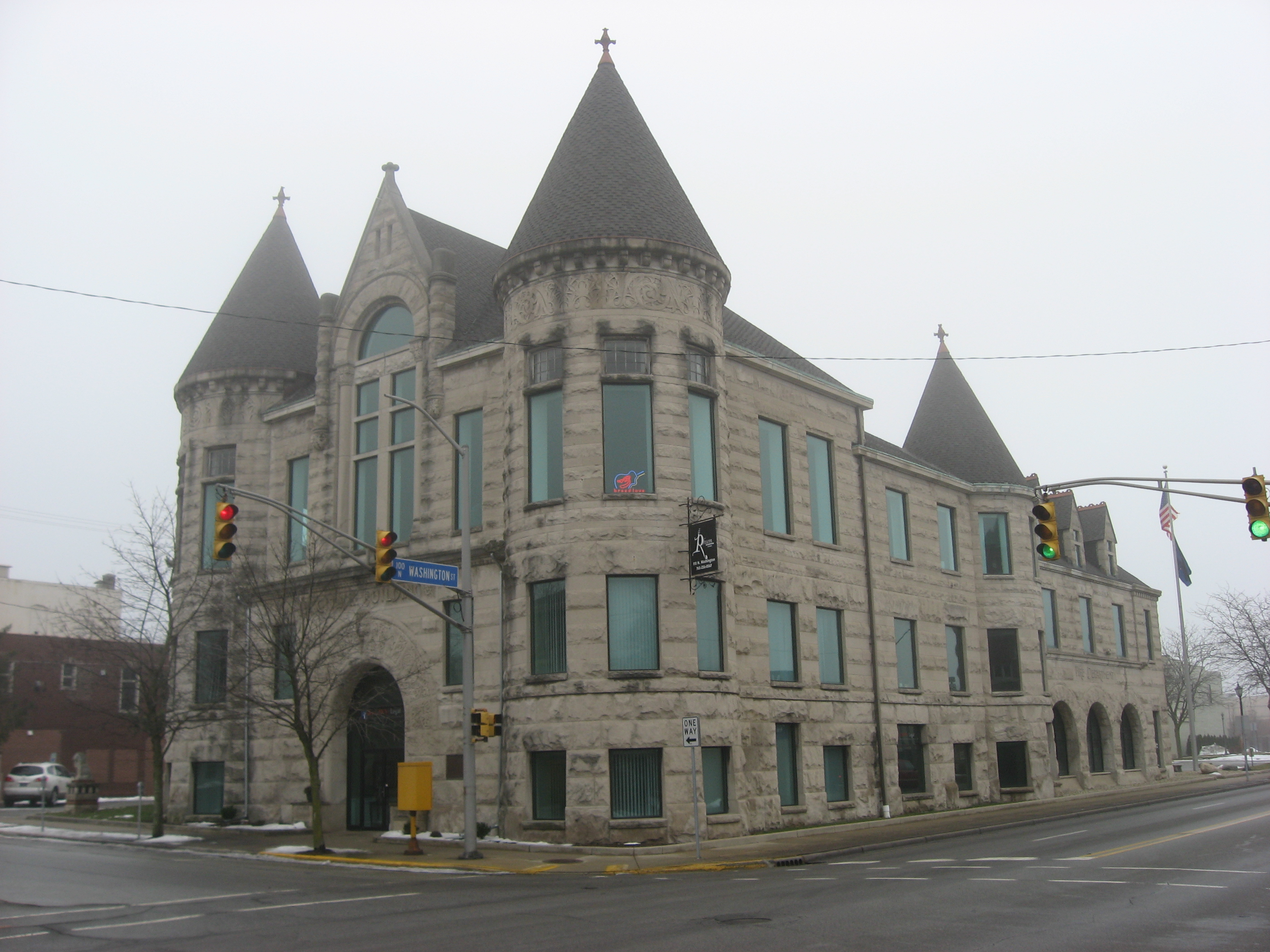
- Former Kokomo City Building, January 2010

- Location within Indiana Location within the United States
- Location: 221 W. Walnut St., Kokomo, Indiana
- Coordinates: 40°29′13″N 86°8′0″W
- Area: 0.3 acres (0.12 ha)
- Built: 1893
- Architect: Wing & Mahurin; Heinzman Brothers
- Architectural style: Romanesque, Richardsonian Romanesque
- NRHP reference No.: 81000014
- Added to NRHP: June 4, 1981

Kokomo City Building is a historic municipal building located at Kokomo, Indiana. It was designed by the architecture firm of Wing & Mahurin and built about 1893. It is a two-story, Richardsonian Romanesque style brick and limestone building on a raised basement. It features rounded corner towers topped by conical roofs and a central stone arch entrance. In the rear (Southwest corner) of the building is the former fire station used until 1979.

It was listed on the National Register of Historic Places in 1981.
