= John H. Bass Mansion =

Historic house in Indiana, United States

- U.S. National Register of Historic Places
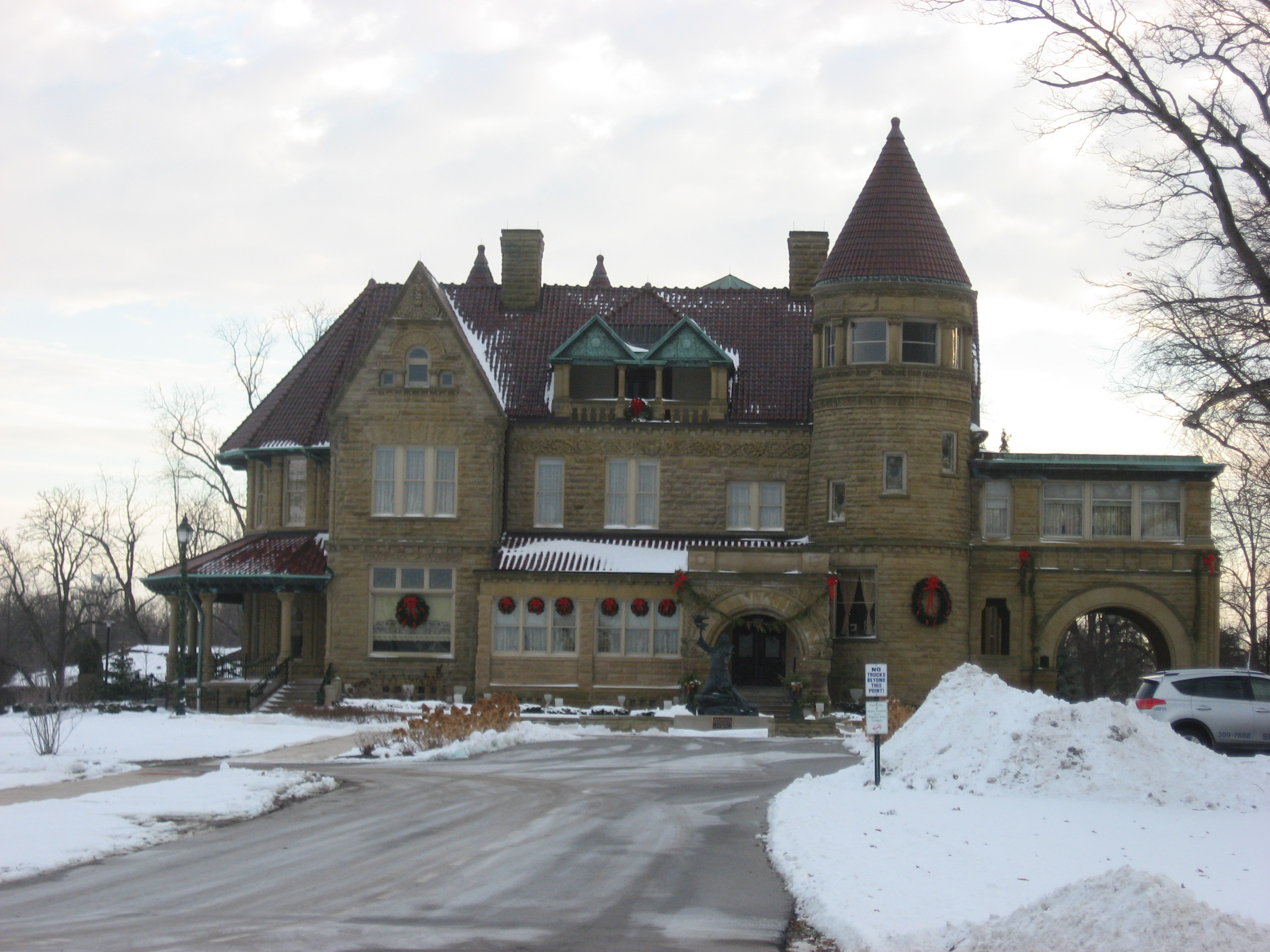
- Front of the house

- Location within Indiana Location within the United States
- Location: 2701 Spring Street; Fort Wayne, Indiana
- Coordinates: 41°5′15″N 85°10′33″W
- Area: less than one acre
- Built: 1902
- Architect: Wing & Mahurin
- Architectural style: Romanesque
- NRHP reference No.: 82000056
- Added to NRHP: June 2, 1982

The Bass Mansion, also known as Brookside, is an administrative building and historic structure at the University of Saint Francis located in Fort Wayne, Indiana. The hand-carved, sandstone mansion was the private residence of industrialist John Henry Bass from 1902 to 1944. The Sisters of Saint Francis of Perpetual Adoration bought the home and more than 65 acres of surrounding landscape from the Bass family in 1944 and relocated their college. Since 1944, the mansion served as library and residence to the college.

== History ==
=== John H. Bass ===
John Henry Bass was born November 9, 1835, in Salem, Kentucky. His brother, Sion S. Bass came to Fort Wayne in 1848 and worked for the Ewing fur-trading business. John arrived in 1852 and worked as a grocery clerk while studying bookkeeping at night school. He became an auditor for the Wabash Railroad and engaged in land speculation along the Iowa border. The brothers started a machine works doing business as Jones, Bass and Company at the site of the present-day post office on South Clinton Street. They sold the business to the railroad and started a foundry with Samuel Hanna. Sion became a colonel with the Thirtieth Regiment and died at Shiloh in 1862.

John bought out the partners and established the Bass Foundry & Machine Works along Hanna Street. The company employed over 1,000 workers. In 1869 he founded the St. Louis Car Wheel Company, and an ironworks in Chicago in 1873. He also owned iron ore mines in Alabama and Tennessee. The company was the world's leading manufacturer of railroad wheels and axles and also produced boilers, engines, and other items.

John married Laura H. Lightfoot of Kentucky on October 30, 1865. He was president of the First National Bank of Fort Wayne for thirty years.

The Brookside estate contained extensive gardens and a deer park. Bass bred Clydesdale horses and Galloway cattle; the farm supplied milk for much of Fort Wayne. Bass died in 1922 and is buried in Lindenwood Cemetery. A popular story says that Bass is still at Brookside, and someone is in the library, he will help them find the book they seek.

=== Brookside ===
In 1982, Brookside, also known as the Bass Mansion, was added to the National Register of Historic Places. In 1889, John Henry Bass (1835–1922), hired local architects Wing and Mahurin to build a Romanesque summer home named Brookside. Bass's primary home was a brick mansion at Fairfield Avenue and Berry Street.

Bass improved the landscape's aesthetic value with a man-made lake outlining the north, east and south façades of the home. In 1902, a gas explosion ignited a basement fire, destroying all but a portion of the exterior masonry. By 1903, the resurrected home incorporated a combination of stone, concrete and steel which endure to this day.

== Preserving History ==
After many years of constant use, restoration efforts began in 2009. By the end of 2010, the mansion had been completely restored. Along with the restoration, the university restored the name of the mansion to Brookside, as John Henry Bass originally planned. The restoration of this 1903 Richardsonian Romanesque masterpiece involved historic investigation of the original decorative work. Each diversely themed room presented a unique challenge in terms of existing condition, decorative style and the lack of clues left behind to guide an accurate conservation and restoration of the original decoration. The comprehensive restoration and aggressive homecoming of original and new decoration celebrates and revives the Bass Mansion's cultural legacy. Conrad Schmitt Studios' restoration of the historic Bass Mansion includes period conservation and replication of the ornate decorative painting and stencil work. Today, mural conservation, stenciling, tromp l'oeil, glazing and gilding adorn the hallowed halls of the restored Bass Mansion.
