= Charles Dugan House =

Historic house in Indiana, United States

- Charles Dugan Mansion
- U.S. National Register of Historic Places
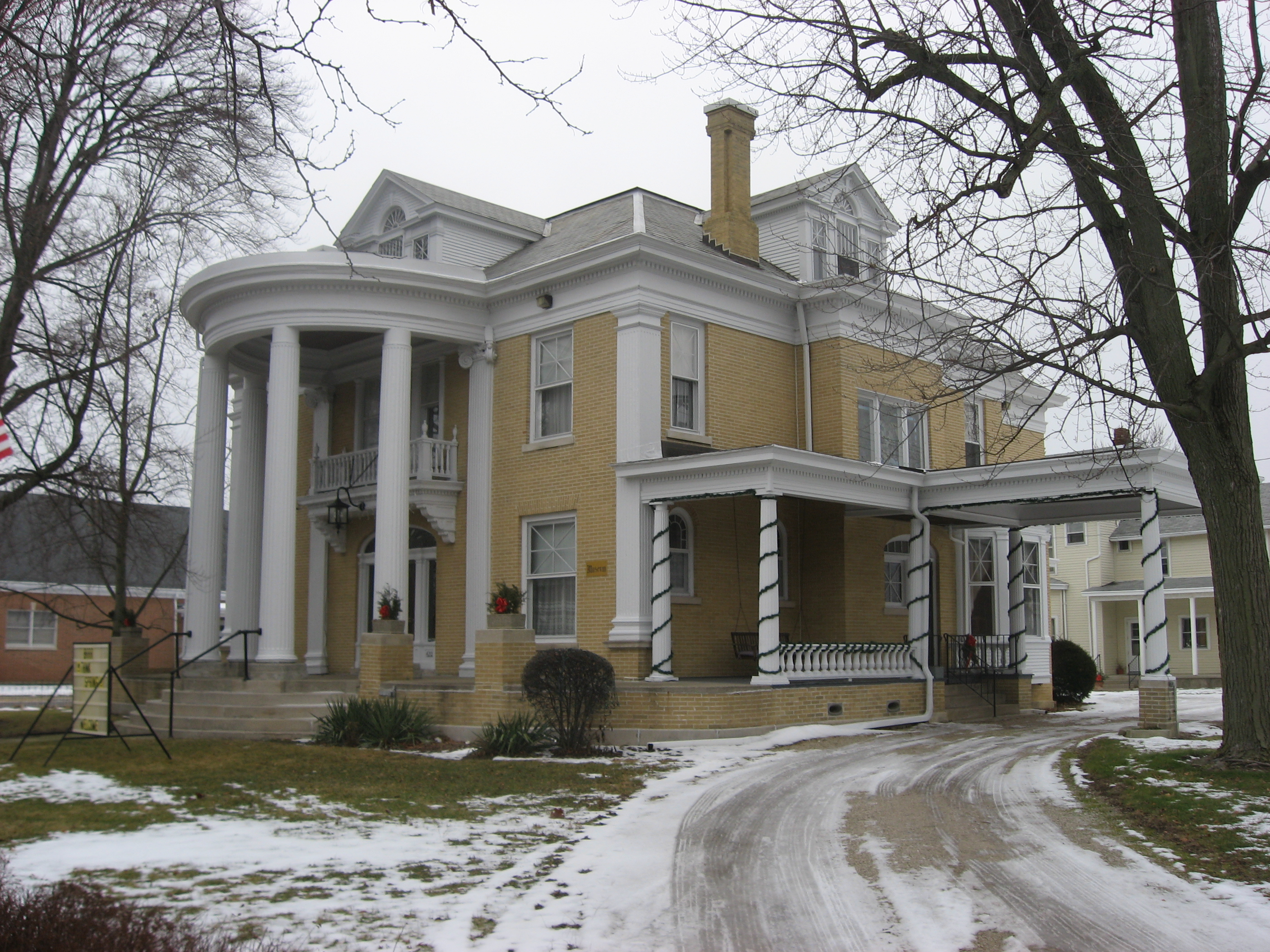
- Charles Dugan House, January 2010

- Location within Adams County, Indiana Location within Indiana Location within the United States
- Location: 420 W. Monroe St., Decatur, Indiana
- Coordinates: 40°49′52″N 84°55′40″W
- Area: less than one acre
- Built: 1902
- Built by: Moon Construction
- Architect: Wing & Mahurin
- Architectural style: Classical Revival
- NRHP reference No.: 09001124
- Added to NRHP: December 22, 2009

Charles Dugan House, also known as the Adams County Historical Society Museum, is a historic home located at Decatur, Indiana. It was designed by the prominent architectural firm of Wing & Mahurin and built in 1902. It is a two-story, Classical Revival style yellow brick dwelling with a hipped roof. The house features a semicircular portico, Doric order corner pilasters, and porte cochere. Also on the property is a contributing frame garage. It was purchased by the Adams County Historical Society Museum in 1968 for $17,250.

It was listed on the National Register of Historic Places in 2009.
