= Greenfield School (Greenfield, Indiana) =

- Greenfield High School
- Formerly listed on the U.S. National Register of Historic Places
- Location: North and Pennsylvania Sts., Greenfield, Indiana
- Area: less than one acre
- Built: 1895-1896
- Architect: Wing & Mahurin; Felt, John H.
- Architectural style: Romanesque
- NRHP reference No.: 82000039

Significant dates
- Added to NRHP: April 22, 1982
- Removed from NRHP: June 18, 1986

Greenfield High School, also known as Riley Elementary School, was a historic school building located at Greenfield, Indiana. It was designed by the architectural firm of Wing & Mahurin and built in 1895–1896. It was a 2 1/2-story, U-shaped, Romanesque Revival style stone-faced building with a 5 1/2-story central tower. It was destroyed by fire on April 30, 1985.

It was listed on the National Register of Historic Places in 1982 and delisted in 1986.
