= Sullivan County Poor Home =

- U.S. National Register of Historic Places
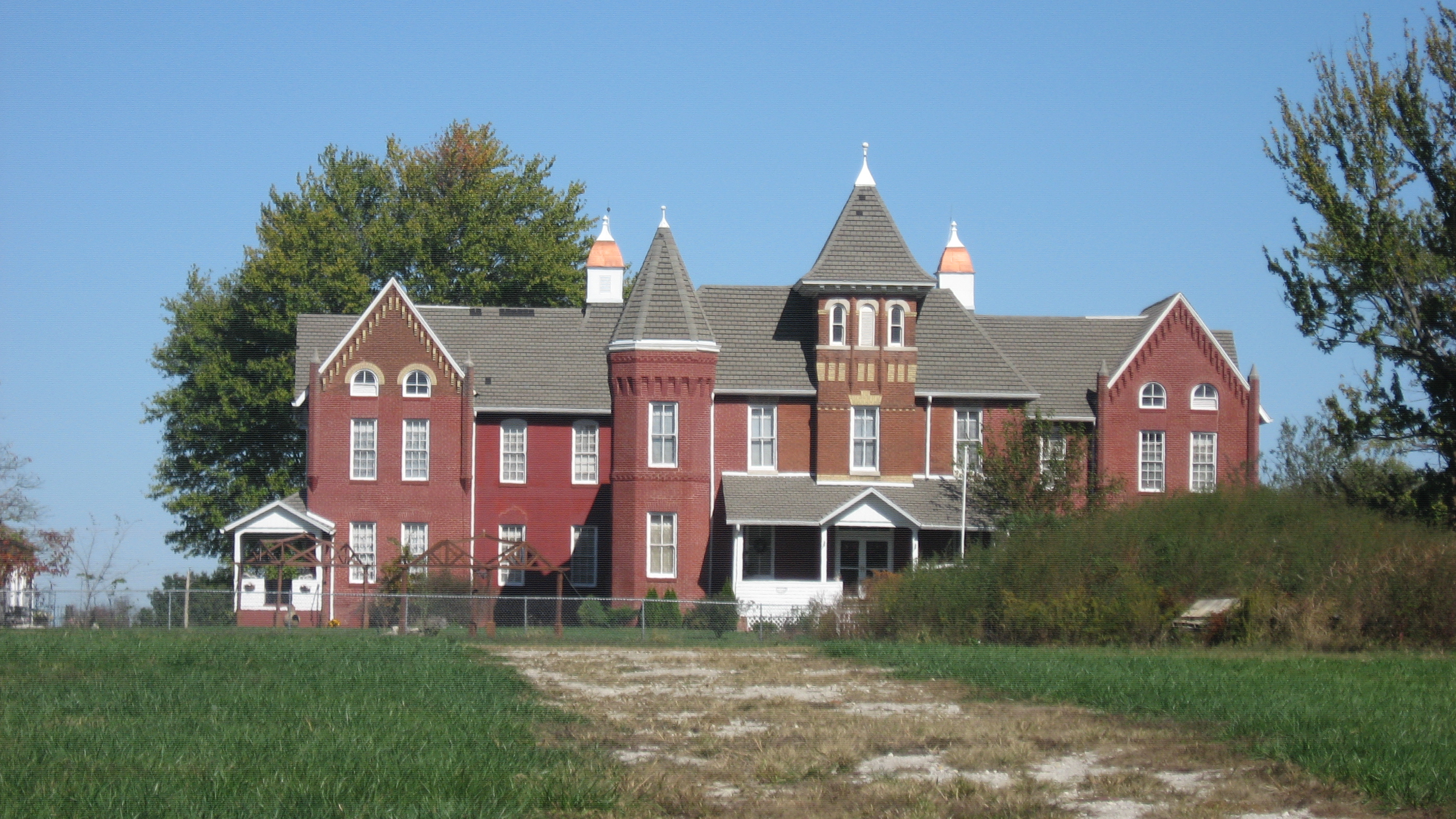
- Sullivan County Poor Home, October 2011

- Location within Indiana
- Location: 1447 Cty Rd. 75 N, east of Sullivan in Hamilton Township, Sullivan County, Indiana
- Coordinates: 39°5′51″N 87°22′57″W
- Area: 3 acres (1.2 ha)
- Built: 1896-1897
- Architect: Wing & Mahurin
- Architectural style: Queen Anne, Romanesque
- NRHP reference No.: 00000207
- Added to NRHP: March 15, 2000

Sullivan County Poor Home, also known as Lakeview Home, is a historic poorhouse located in Hamilton Township, Sullivan County, Indiana, United States. It was designed by the architecture firm Wing & Mahurin and built in 1896–1897. It is a 2 1/2-story, asymmetrical, Romanesque Revival style brick building, consisting of a central section with flanking wings. It features a projecting central tower with arched openings and a pyramidal roof and an octagonal tower. Also on the property is a contributing one-story, two-room cottage. The home was named Lakeview Home in 1947, and remained in operation until 1998.

It was listed on the National Register of Historic Places in 2000.
