= Union City, Indiana =

- City
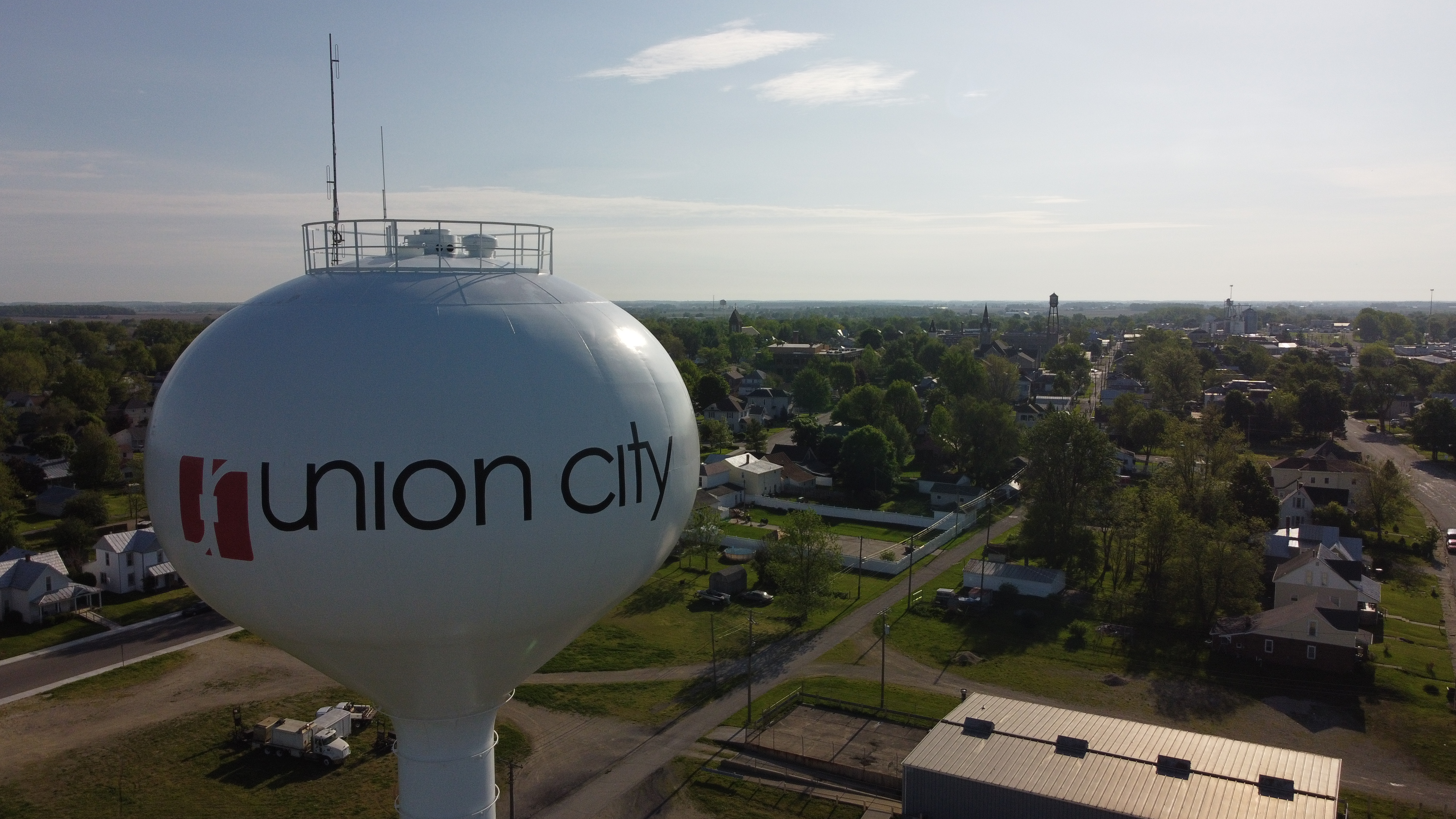
- Union City water tower and skyline

- Flag

- Location of Union City in Randolph County, Indiana.
- Coordinates: 40°11′58″N 84°49′14″W
- Country: United States
- State: Indiana
- County: Randolph
- Township: Wayne

Government
  - Mayor: Chad E. Spence (R)

Area
  - Total: 2.27 sq mi (5.87 km^{2})
  - Land: 2.26 sq mi (5.85 km^{2})
  - Water: 0.0077 sq mi (0.02 km^{2}) 0.45%
- Elevation: 1,109 ft (338 m)

Population (2020)
  - Total: 3,454
  - Estimate (2025): 3,391 ▼
  - Density: 1,530.4/sq mi (590.88/km^{2})
- Time zone: UTC-5 (EST)
  - Summer (DST): UTC-4 (EDT)
- ZIP code: 47390
- Area code: 765
- FIPS code: 18-77768
- GNIS feature ID: 2397087
- Website: www.unioncityinoh.com

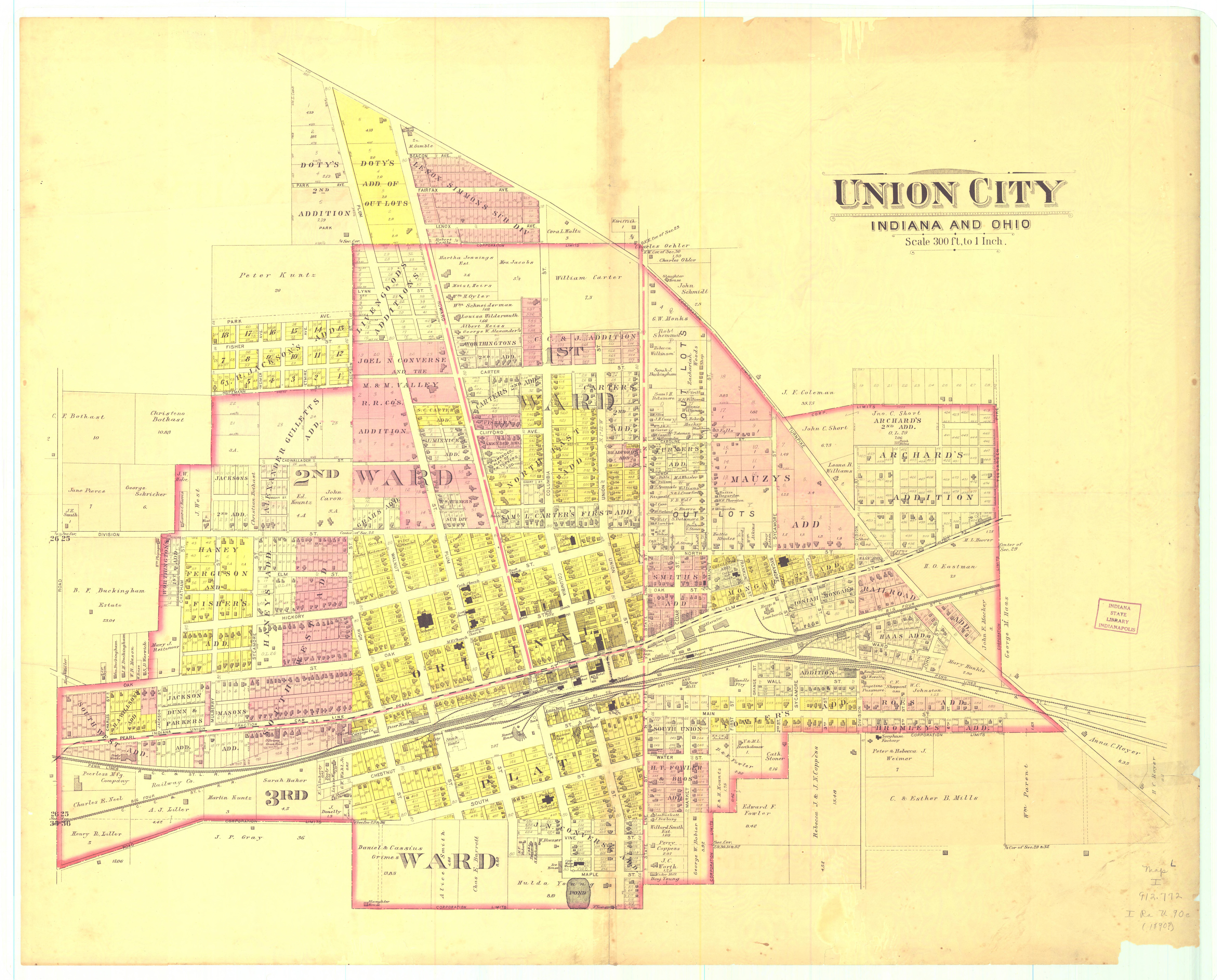
Map from around 1890 showing property owners and details of Union City Indiana and Ohio

Union City is a city in Wayne Township, Randolph County, Indiana, United States. As of the 2020 census, the city had a population of 3,454.

Union City was a stop along the Pittsburgh, Cincinnati, Chicago and St. Louis Railroad, a forerunner of the Pennsylvania Railroad that connected Pittsburgh to Chicago and St. Louis. The Cleveland, Cincinnati, Chicago and St. Louis Railway (also known as the "Big Four", a predecessor of the New York Central) had the east–west route connecting Indianapolis, Anderson and Muncie, Indiana with Sidney, Bellefontaine and Columbus, Ohio. It is believed by some area residents that the town got its nickname "The Hub City" because the two railroads intersected near the Ohio and Indiana state line.

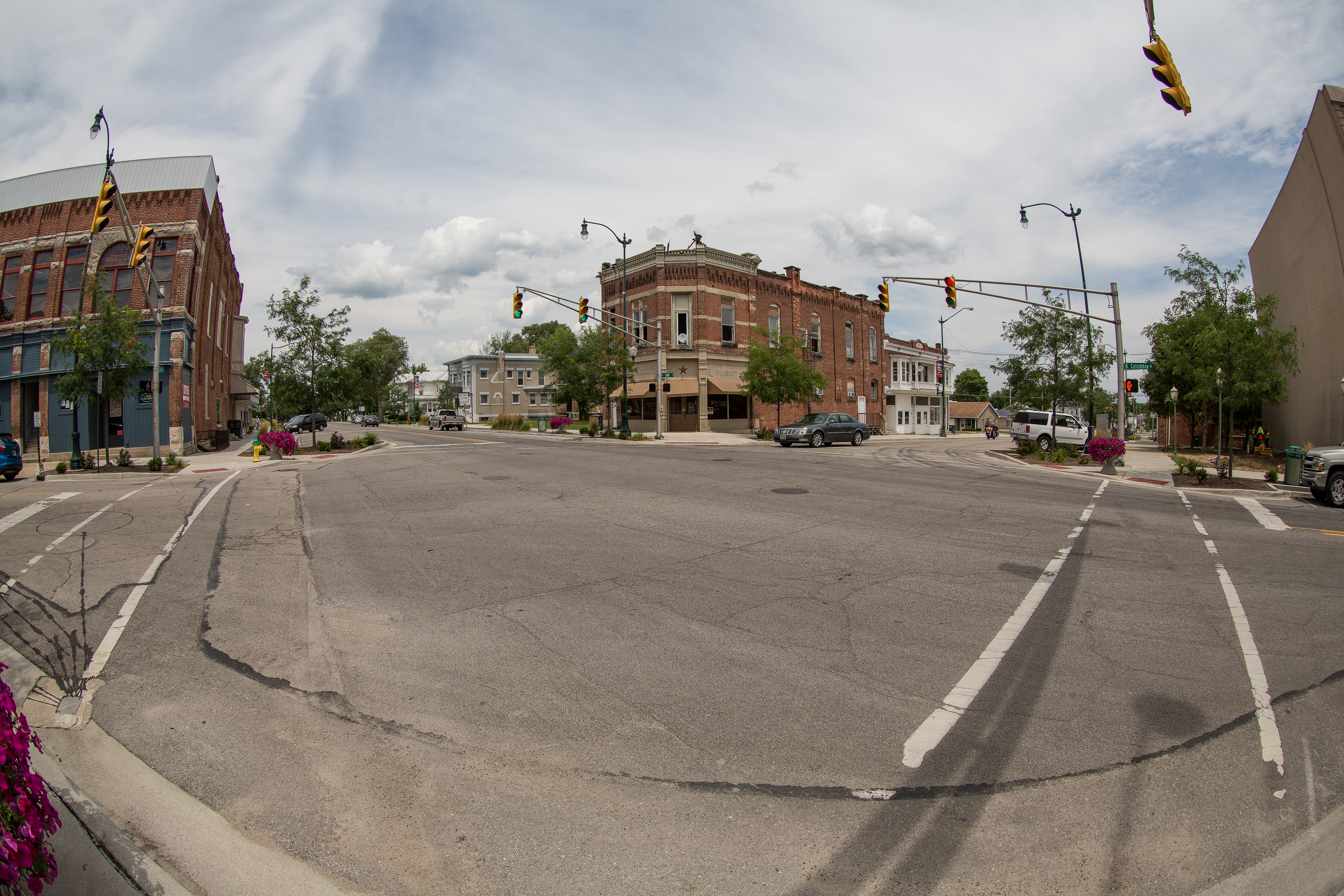
Union City, Indiana

== History ==
Union City was platted in 1849, eleven years after its twin city of Union City, Ohio. A post office has been in operation at Union City, Indiana since 1852.

The William Kerr House, Raphael Kirshbaum Building, Union City Commercial Historic District, Union City Passenger Depot, Union City Public Library, and Union City School are listed on the National Register of Historic Places.

== Geography ==
According to the 2010 census, Union City has a total area of 2.209 square miles (5.72 km^{2}), of which 2.2 square miles (5.70 km^{2}) (or 99.59%) is land and 0.009 square miles (0.02 km^{2}) (or 0.41%) is water.

== Demographics ==
Historical population
Census	Pop.	Note	%±
1870	1,439		—
1880	2,478		72.2%
1890	2,681		8.2%
1900	2,716		1.3%
1910	3,209		18.2%
1920	3,406		6.1%
1930	3,084		−9.5%
1940	3,535		14.6%
1950	3,572		1.0%
1960	4,047		13.3%
1970	3,995		−1.3%
1980	3,908		−2.2%
1990	3,612		−7.6%
2000	3,622		0.3%
2010	3,584		−1.0%
2020	3,454		−3.6%
2025 (est.)	3,391		−1.8%
U.S. Decennial Census

=== 2020 census ===
As of the 2020 census, Union City had a population of 3,454. The median age was 37.4 years. 27.2% of residents were under the age of 18 and 18.5% of residents were 65 years of age or older. For every 100 females there were 99.4 males, and for every 100 females age 18 and over there were 96.6 males age 18 and over.

98.2% of residents lived in urban areas, while 1.8% lived in rural areas.

There were 1,421 households in Union City, of which 29.3% had children under the age of 18 living in them. Of all households, 37.2% were married-couple households, 23.2% were households with a male householder and no spouse or partner present, and 30.5% were households with a female householder and no spouse or partner present. About 34.5% of all households were made up of individuals and 18.4% had someone living alone who was 65 years of age or older.

There were 1,685 housing units, of which 15.7% were vacant. The homeowner vacancy rate was 5.2% and the rental vacancy rate was 12.9%.

Racial composition as of the 2020 census
Race	Number	Percent
White	2,750	79.6%
Black or African American	34	1.0%
American Indian and Alaska Native	18	0.5%
Asian	0	0.0%
Native Hawaiian and Other Pacific Islander	0	0.0%
Some other race	430	12.4%
Two or more races	222	6.4%
Hispanic or Latino (of any race)	709	20.5%

=== 2010 census ===
As of the census of 2010, there were 3,584 people, 1,477 households, and 922 families residing in the city. The population density was 1,629.1 inhabitants per square mile (629.0/km^{2}). There were 1,733 housing units at an average density of 787.7 per square mile (304.1/km^{2}). The racial makeup of the city was 87.6% White, 1.1% African American, 0.1% Native American, 0.1% Asian, 9.2% from other races, and 1.9% from two or more races. Hispanic or Latino of any race were 12.8% of the population.

There were 1,477 households, of which 33.0% had children under the age of 18 living with them, 41.4% were married couples living together, 15.2% had a female householder with no husband present, 5.8% had a male householder with no wife present, and 37.6% were non-families. 32.8% of all households were made up of individuals, and 17% had someone living alone who was 65 years of age or older. The average household size was 2.43 and the average family size was 3.04.

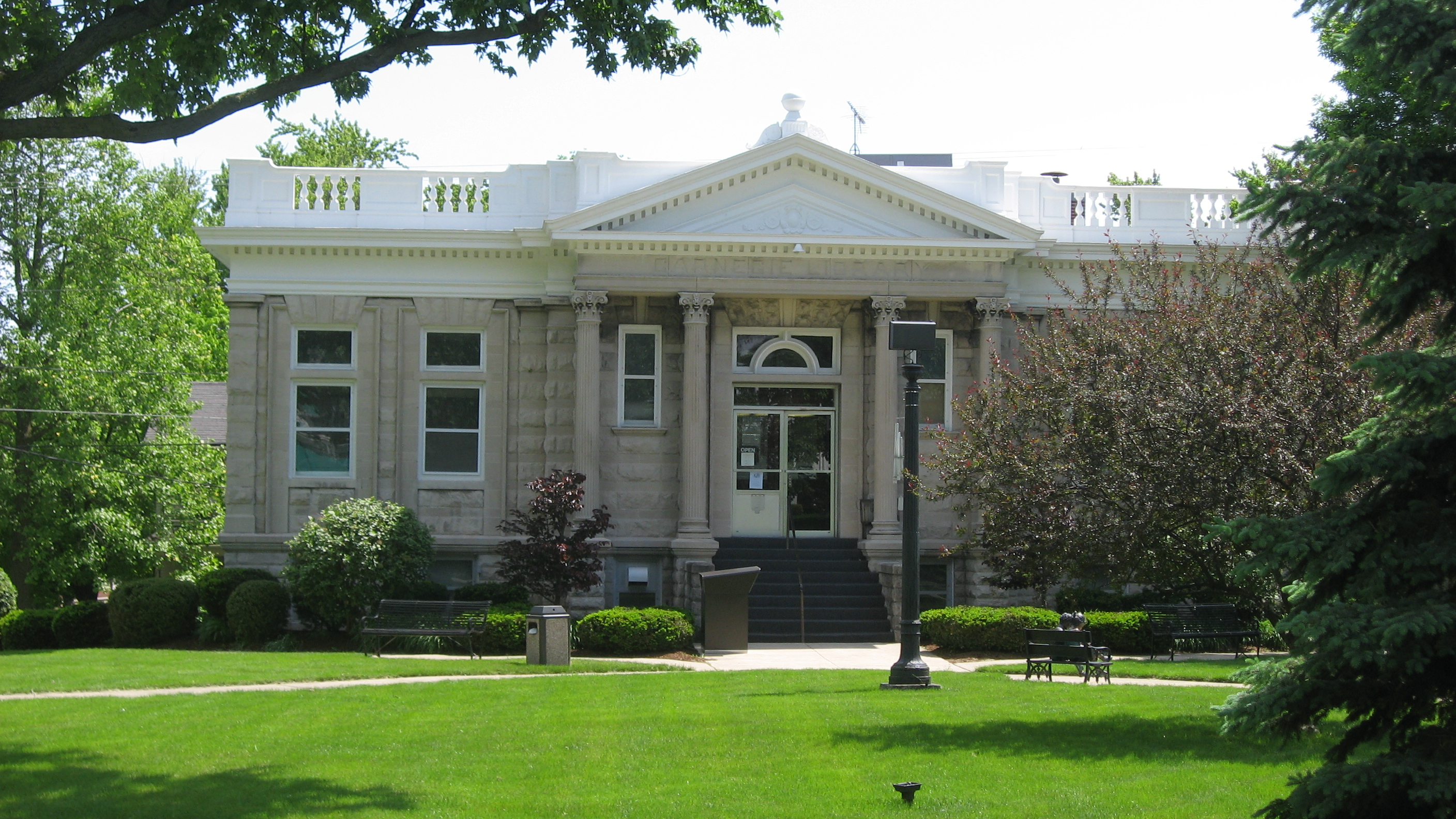
The Union City Public Library is one of six sites in Union City listed on the National Register of Historic Places

The median age in the city was 35.4 years. 28.3% of residents were under the age of 18; 8.7% were between the ages of 18 and 24; 24.7% were from 25 to 44; 21.9% were from 45 to 64; and 16.5% were 65 years of age or older. The gender makeup of the city was 48.6% male and 51.4% female.

=== 2000 census ===
As of the census of 2000, there were 3,622 people, 1,569 households, and 969 families residing in the city. The population density was 1,995.1 inhabitants per square mile (770.3/km^{2}). There were 1,738 housing units at an average density of 957.3 per square mile (369.6/km^{2}). The racial makeup of the city was 94.04% White, 1.02% African American, 0.17% Native American, 0.22% Asian, 0.08% Pacific Islander, 3.12% from other races, and 1.35% from two or more races. Hispanic or Latino of any race were 4.53% of the population.

There were 1,569 households, of which 29.3% had children under the age of 18 living with them, 46.3% were married couples living together, 11.7% had a female householder with no husband present, and 38.2% were non-families. 34.4% of all households were made up of individuals, and 17.8% had someone living alone who was 65 years of age or older. The average household size was 2.29 and the average family size was 2.91.

In the city, the population was 25.2% under the age of 18, 9.2% from 18 to 24, 25.9% from 25 to 44, 21.5% from 45 to 64, and 18.2% who were 65 years of age or older. The median age was 37 years. For every 100 females, there were 90.4 males. For every 100 females age 18 and over, there were 88.3 males.

The median income for a household in the city was $26,526, and the median income for a family was $34,250. Males had a median income of $27,877 versus $17,850 for females. The per capita income for the city was $13,981. About 14.5% of families and 19.7% of the population were below the poverty line, including 31.4% of those under age 18 and 14.1% of those age 65 or over.

== Education ==
The Randolph Eastern School Corporation serves Union City through two schools: North Side Elementary School and Union City Community High School. They are housed in adjoining buildings on the northwest side of the town.

The town has a lending library, the Union City Public Library.

== Media ==
UnionCityNow.com is a locally owned online media outlet that focuses on current events and news stories in the community. The site also contains discussion forums focused on Union City history and local genealogy.

KISS TV is a local-access television station run by the school corporation. It broadcasts on the local Time Warner Cable feed, as well as online. The school's DECA chapter also runs two school businesses: "The TeePee", a school store where students and staff can buy snacks during lunch periods, and "Apache Design", a T-shirt printing business where students record and produce orders for school functions and for organizations in the community and surrounding area.

WJYW 88.9 "Joy FM" broadcasts a Contemporary Christian music format.

WTGR 97.5 FM "Tiger Country" is licensed to neighboring Union City, Ohio, with a studio in Greenville and a new studio to be built in Winchester.

== Flag ==
The flag of Union City was adopted on January 20, 2021, by vote of the people of Union City.

The design features a red background with a blue stripe, surrounding a white skinny stripe. The colors represent the United States. On the center is a big blue star on the center of the state outlines of Indiana and Ohio, which represent the city's location and ties to both states.

Mayor Chad E. Spence said in January 2021 that he supported the flag's design.

== Notable people ==
- Donald R. Atkinson, educator and writer
- Rick Derringer, guitarist and founding member of The McCoys.
- Isaac P. Gray, 18th and 20th governor of Indiana and Minister to Mexico in the second Cleveland administration.
- Chris Hawkey, country music artist, producer of the Power Trip Morning Show on KFAN Radio in Minneapolis/St. Paul, MN.
- Earle Raymond Hedrick, mathematician and vice president of University of California.
- Randy Jo Hobbs (1948–1993), Bassist and founding member of The McCoys.
- Henry Jackson (1861–1932), born in Union City, was a major-league baseball player for the Indianapolis Hoosiers in 1887.
- Haleloke Kahauolopua, a Hawaiian-born singer who retired to Union City.
