= Gen. Asahel Stone Mansion =

Historic house in Indiana, United States

- U.S. National Register of Historic Places
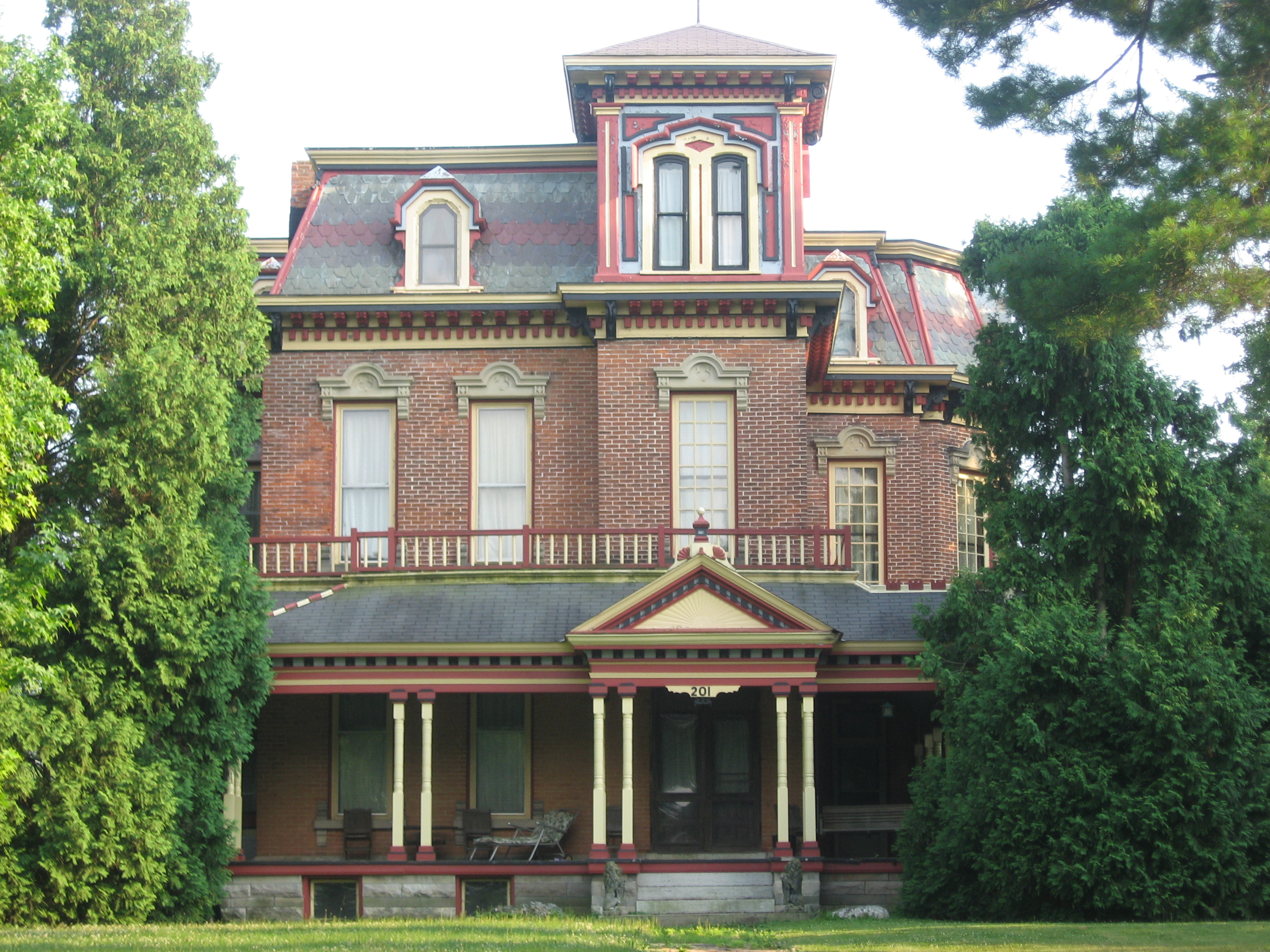
- General Asahel Stone Mansion, July 2011

- Location within Indiana Location within the United States
- Location: 201 W. Orange St., Winchester, Indiana
- Coordinates: 40°9′56″N 84°58′58″W
- Area: 2.5 acres (1.0 ha)
- Built: 1872
- Architectural style: Second Empire
- NRHP reference No.: 79000040
- Added to NRHP: March 21, 1979

Gen. Asahel Stone Mansion is a historic home located at Winchester, Indiana. It was built in 1872, and is a 2 1/2-story, Second Empire style brick dwelling. It has a mansard roof and wraparound porch. It features a three-story, square tower with a low hipped roof.

It was added to the National Register of Historic Places in 1978.

On March 14, 2024, the Stone Mansion was damaged by a tornado which impacted Winchester.
