= Union City School =

- U.S. National Register of Historic Places
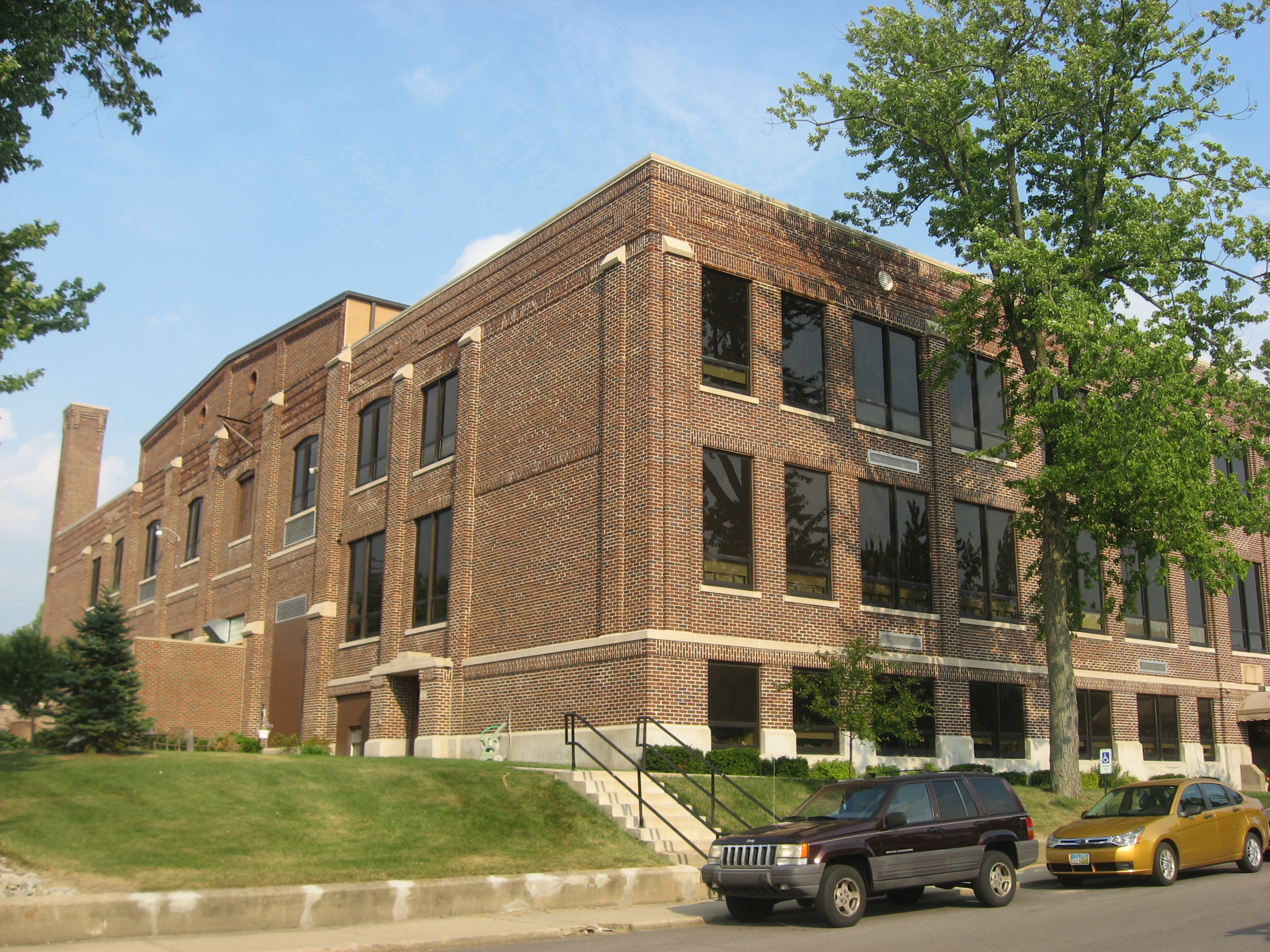
- Union City School, July 2011

- Location within Indiana Location within the United States
- Location: 310 N Walnut St, Union City, Indiana
- Coordinates: 40°11′58″N 84°48′49″W
- Area: less than one acre
- Built: 1920-1921
- Architect: Mahurin & Mahurin; English brothers
- Architectural style: Bungalow/craftsman
- MPS: Indiana's Public Common and High Schools MPS
- NRHP reference No.: 10000379
- Added to NRHP: June 24, 2010

Union City School, also known as West Side Middle School, is a historic school building located at Union City, Indiana. It was designed by the architecture firm of Mahurin & Mahurin and built in 1920–1921. It is a two-story, brick building with Bungalow / American Craftsman design elements. It has a U-shaped plan that surrounds a central auditorium. It simple classical ornamentation including round arches with and multi-coursed brick work. It remained in use as a school until 2003.

It was added to the National Register of Historic Places in 2010.
