= Raphael Kirshbaum Building =

- U.S. National Register of Historic Places
- U.S. Historic district – Contributing property
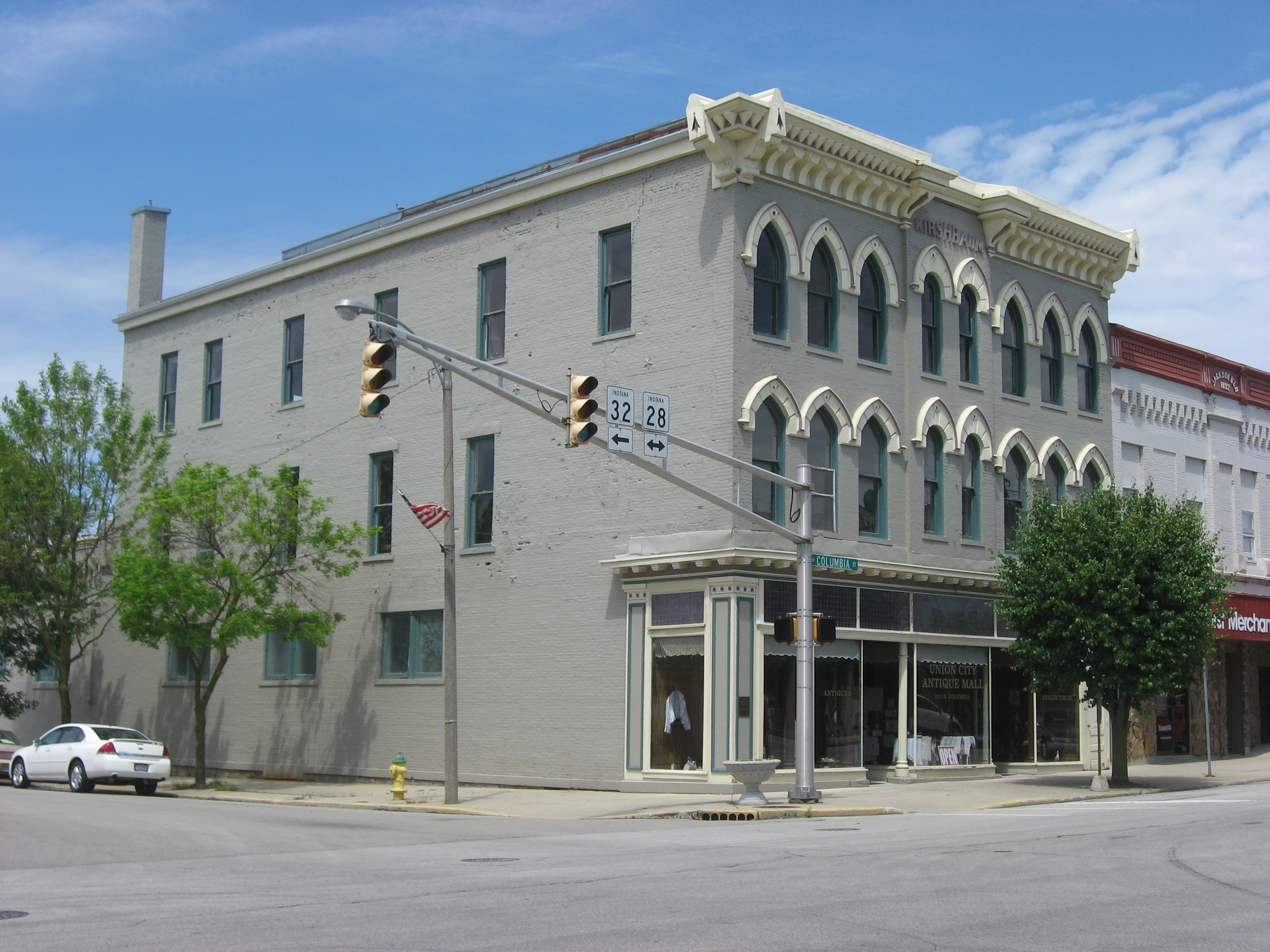
- Raphael Kirshbaum Building, May 2010

- Location within Indiana Location within the United States
- Location: NW corner Columbia and W. Pearl Sts., Union City, Indiana
- Coordinates: 40°11′55″N 84°48′30″W
- Area: less than one acre
- Built: 1876
- Architectural style: Italianate
- NRHP reference No.: 90000813
- Added to NRHP: May 24, 1990

Raphael Kirshbaum Building, also known as the R. Kirshbaum Company, is a historic commercial building located at Union City, Indiana. It was built in 1876, and is a three-story, rectangular, Italianate style brick building. It features rounded arch openings with pressed tin hoodmolds and a metal cornice with a wide overhang supported by brackets.

It was added to the National Register of Historic Places in 1990. It is located in the Union City Commercial Historic District.
