= Union City Public Library =

- U.S. National Register of Historic Places
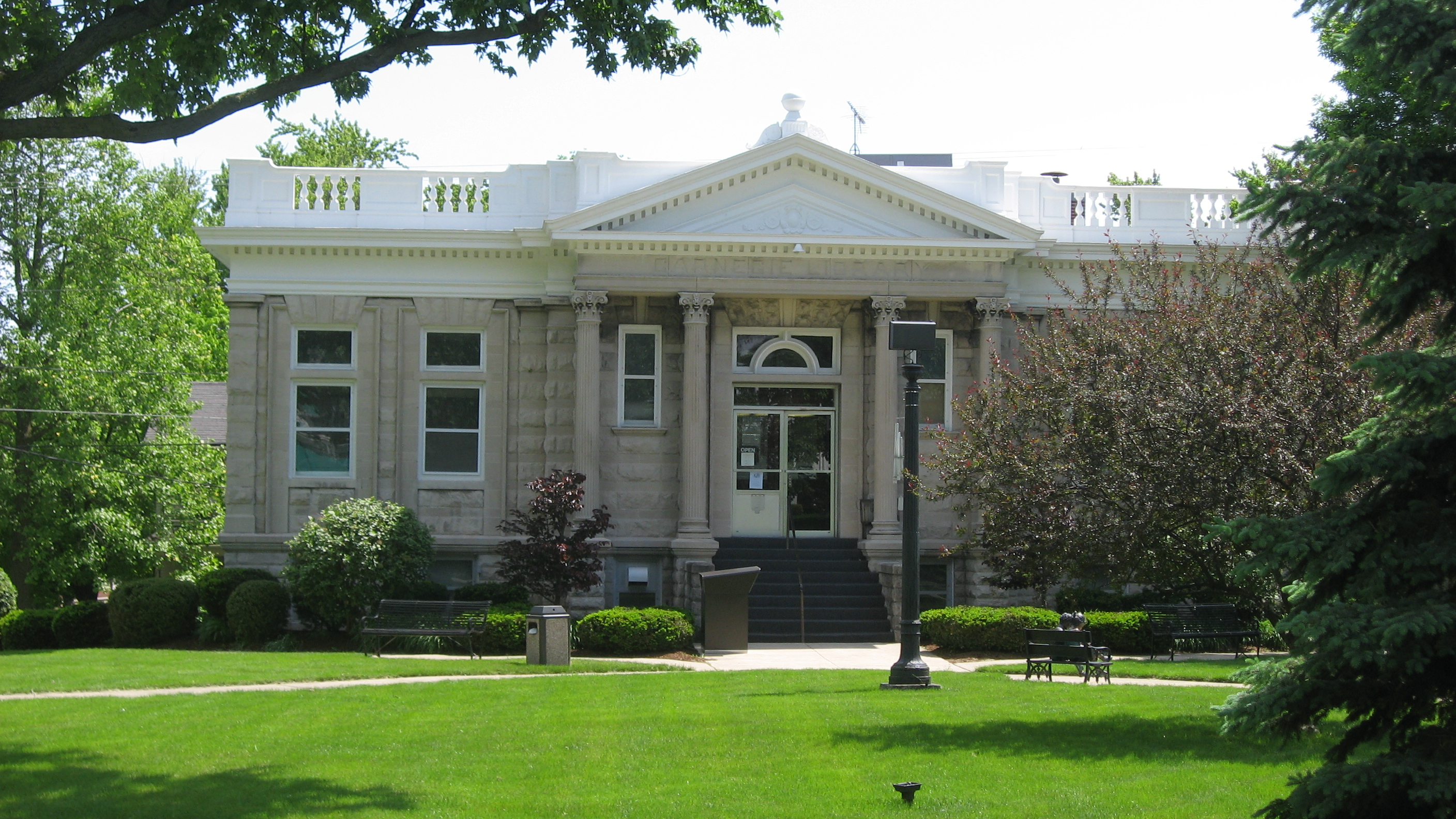
- Union City Public Library, May 2010

- Location within Indiana Location within the United States
- Location: 408 N. Columbia St., Union City, Indiana
- Coordinates: 40°12′6″N 84°48′30″W
- Area: 1.8 acres (0.73 ha)
- Built: 1904
- Architect: Wright and Duncan firm, of Anderson, Indiana; Building Contractor: Steele, J.M, of Union City, Indiana
- Architectural style: Classical Revival
- NRHP reference No.: 04000631
- Added to NRHP: June 22, 2004

Union City Public Library is a historic Carnegie library building located at Union City, Indiana. A grant request application was sent to Andrew Carnegie in the Fall of 1903, announcement for the approval of the grant was received in Union City in early December 1903, construction bids were taken in early 1904, ground was broken and foundation construction was started in early June 1904, and the building was completed and the library's collection installed in May, 1905, in time for a public grand opening and celebration held on June 8, 1905. The structure, of which the final design was approved by Carnegie, is a Classical Revival style Indiana limestone building with an upper main floor, and a former basement storage area which has been converted over for a youth services library and programing. Its design features a wooden pediment supported by four Corinthian order limestone columns and a wood balustrade. Its construction was funded by a $10,000 grant from the Carnegie Foundation.

This building was added to the National Register of Historic Places in 2004, and still contains an active public library, one of five library systems in Randolph County.

== See also ==
- List of Carnegie libraries in Indiana
