= William Kerr House =

Historic house in Indiana, United States

- U.S. National Register of Historic Places
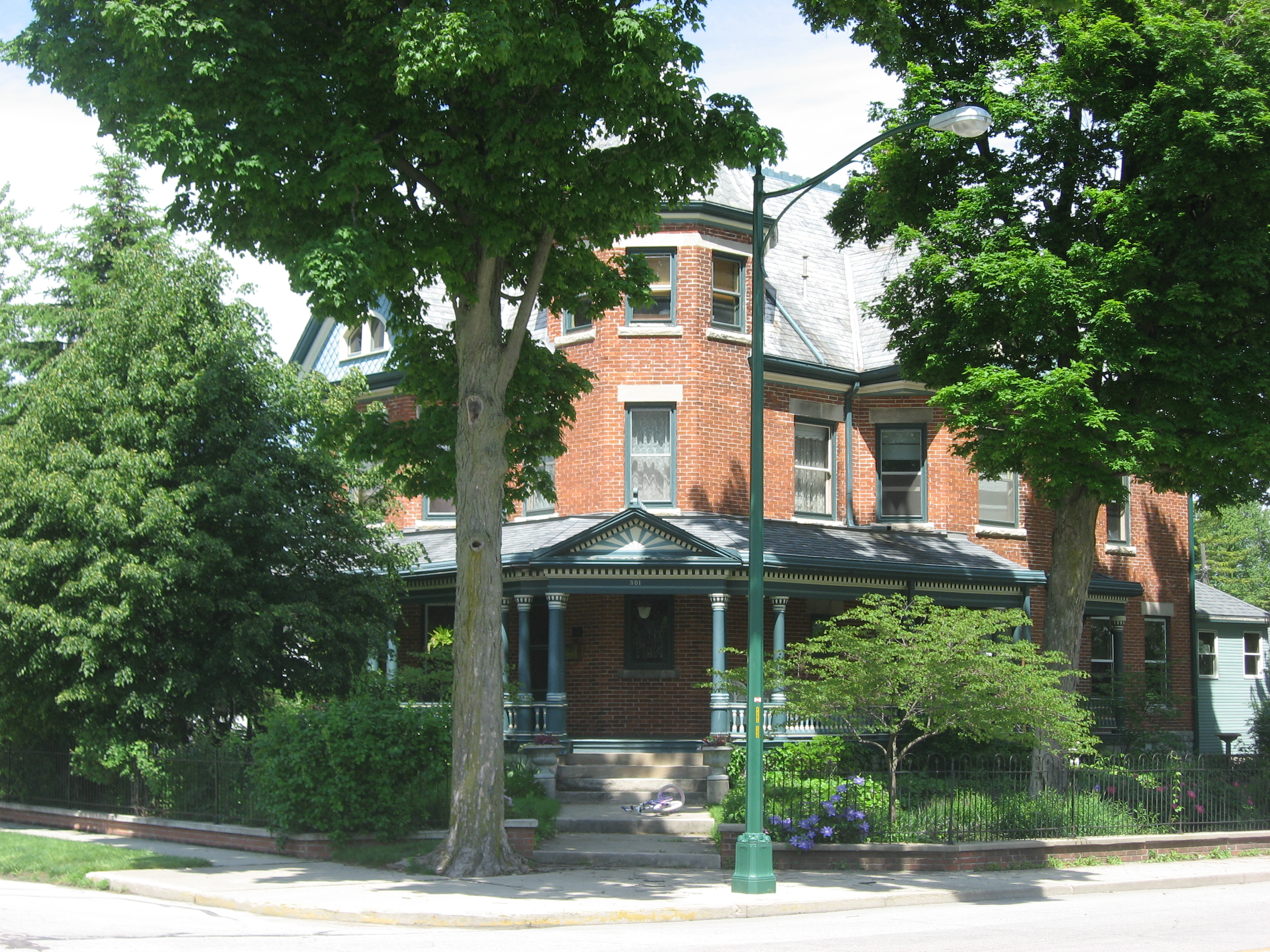
- William Kerr House, May 2010

- Location within Indiana Location within the United States
- Location: 501 N. Columbia St., Union City, Indiana
- Coordinates: 40°12′8″N 84°48′33″W
- Area: less than one acre
- Built: 1896
- Architect: Barber, George F. & Co.
- Architectural style: Queen Anne
- NRHP reference No.: 87001776
- Added to NRHP: October 1, 1987

William Kerr House is a historic home located at Union City, Indiana. It was designed by architecture firm of George F. Barber & Co. and built about 1896. It is a 2 1/2-story, Queen Anne style brick veneer dwelling. It has a hipped cross-gable roof sheathed in slate. It features a hexagonal corner tower, gabled three-sided bays, and a wraparound porch. Also on the property is a contributing brick garage (c. 1920).

It was added to the National Register of Historic Places in 1987.
