= Union City Commercial Historic District =

Historic district in Indiana, United States

- U.S. National Register of Historic Places
- U.S. Historic district
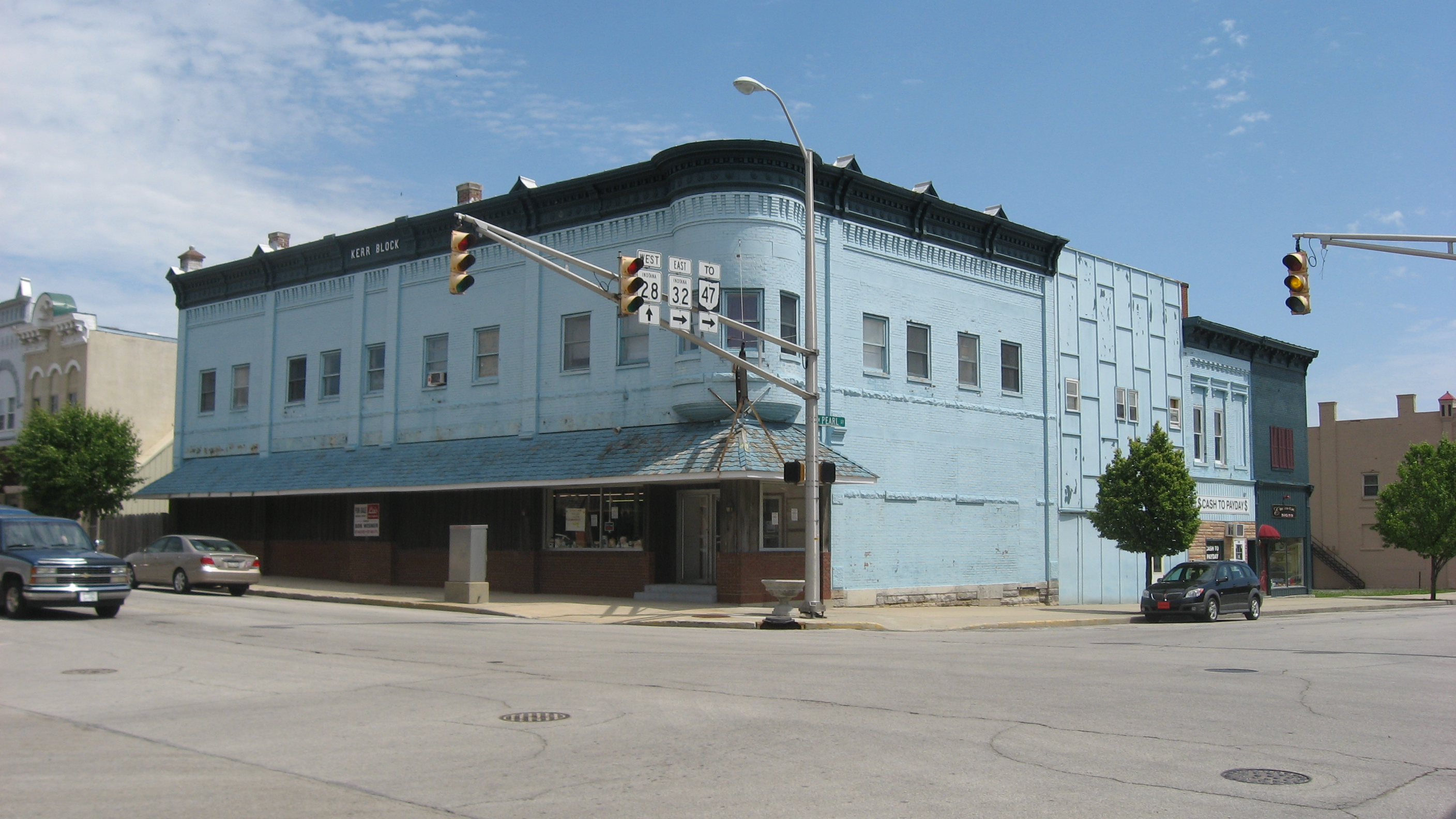
- Kerr Block, May 2010

- Location within Indiana Location within the United States
- Location: Roughly bounded by W. Oak, N. Union, W. Smith, and N. Howard Sts., Union City, Indiana
- Coordinates: 40°11′56″N 84°48′30″W
- Area: 16 acres (6.5 ha)
- Architectural style: Italianate, Romanesque
- NRHP reference No.: 99000303
- Added to NRHP: March 12, 1999

Union City Commercial Historic District is a national historic district located at Union City, Indiana. The district encompasses 53 contributing buildings in the central business district of Union City. The district developed between about 1870 and 1948 and includes notable examples of Italianate and Romanesque Revival style architecture. Located in the district is the separately listed Raphael Kirshbaum Building. Other notable buildings include the Jackson Building (1892), J.K. Building (1889), Grazhs Building (1893), and Union City Post Office (1935).

It was added to the National Register of Historic Places, in 1999.
