= Winchester Courthouse Square Historic District =

Historic district in Indiana, United States

- U.S. National Register of Historic Places
- U.S. Historic district
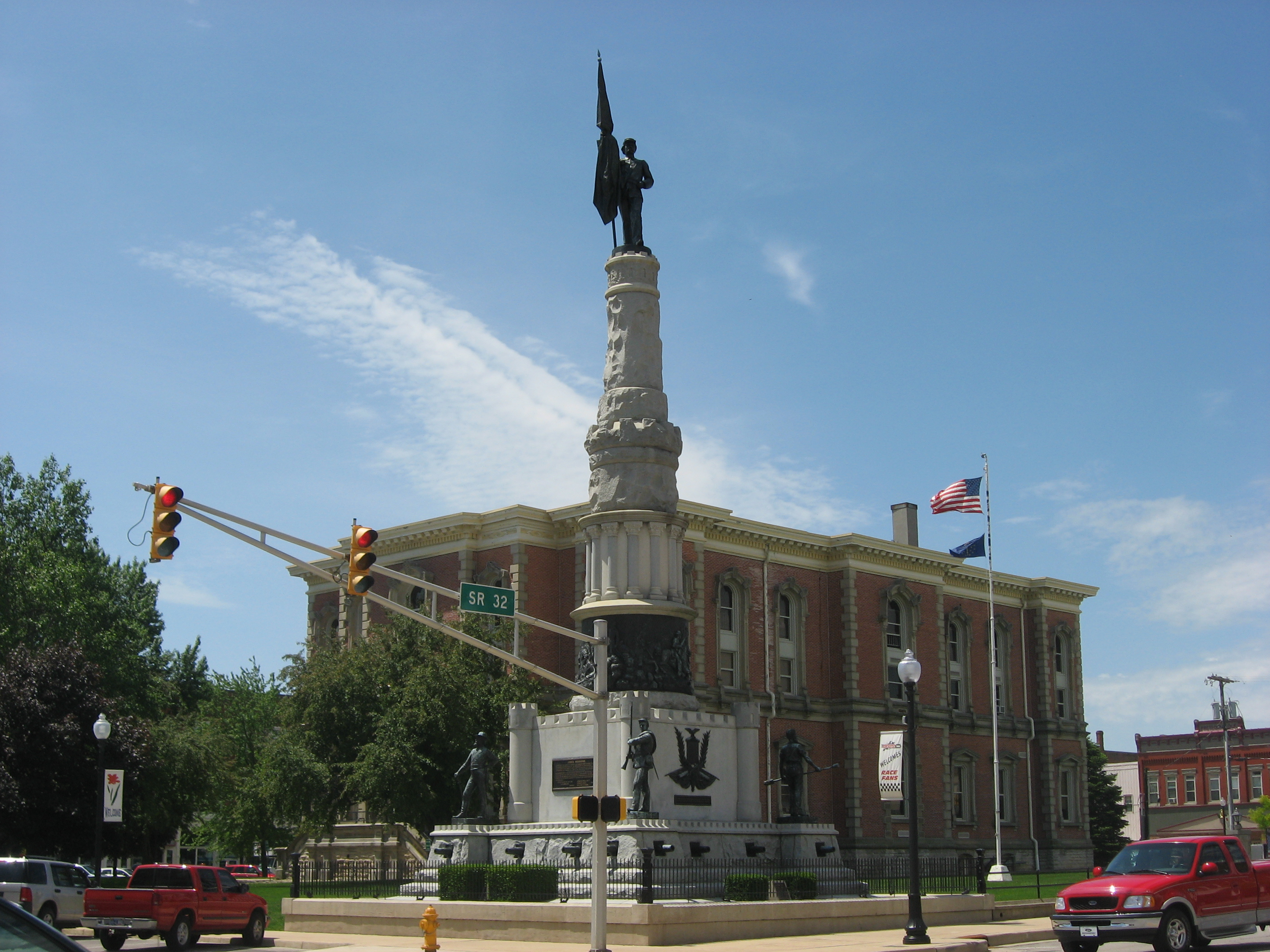
- Randolph County Courthouse and monument, May 2010

- Location within Indiana Location within the United States
- Interactive map showing the location for Winchester Courthouse Square Historic District
- Location: Roughly bounded by North St., and the alleys located to the E of Main St., Winchester, Indiana
- Coordinates: 40°10′27″N 84°58′20″W
- Area: 14 acres (5.7 ha)
- Built: 1875
- Architect: Johnson, J.C.; et.al.
- Architectural style: Italianate, Romanesque, et.al.
- NRHP reference No.: 01000405
- Added to NRHP: August 9, 2001

Winchester Courthouse Square Historic District is a national historic district located at Winchester, Indiana. The district encompasses 52 contributing buildings and 10 contributing structures in the central business district of Winchester. The district developed between about 1875 and 1950 and includes notable examples of Italianate, Romanesque Revival, and Classical Revival style architecture. Notable buildings include the Randolph County Courthouse (1875), U.S. Post Office (1932), I.O.O.F. Hall (c. 1875), Winchester Community Library (1906), Masonic Lodge (c. 1925), Randolph Hotel (c. 1910), David Building (1927), and W.E. Miller Department Store (1883). Notable structures include the "Spirit of the Doughboy" monument (1928), Lamp of Freedom (c. 1950), Soldiers and Sailors monument (1892), and Lorado Taft Marker (c. 1936).

It was added to the National Register of Historic Places in 2001.
