= Public Protection Classification Program =

The Public Protection Classification (PPC) program, is a tool developed by the Insurance Services Office (ISO) for property and casualty insurers to properly assess their risk by rating fire protection services throughout the United States.

== Class determination ==
ISO collects data for more than 47,000 communities and fire districts throughout the country. The data is then analyzed using a proprietary Fire Suppression Rating Schedule (FSRS). The Schedule then assigns a PPC score between 1 and 10 to the department, with Class 1 representing "superior property fire protection" and Class 10 indicating that an area doesn't meet the minimum criteria set by the ISO. On July 1, 2013, the revised FSRS was released, adding an emphasis on a community's effort to limit loss before an incident occurs.

In developing a PPC, the following major categories are evaluated:

- Emergency Communications: Fire alarm and communication systems, including telephone systems, telephone lines, staffing and dispatching systems.
- Fire Department: The fire department, including equipment, staffing, training and geographic distraction of fire companies.
- Water Supply: The water supply system, including the condition and maintenance of hydrants and the amount of available water compared with the amount need to suppress fires.

Added 2013 criteria:

- Fire Prevention: programs that contain plan review; certificate of occupancy inspections; compliance follow-up; inspection of fire protection equipment; and fire prevention regulations related to fire lanes on area roads, hazardous material routes, fireworks, barbecue grills, and wildland–urban interface areas.
- Public Fire Safety Education Programs: fire safety education training and programs for schools, private homes and buildings with large loss potential or hazardous conditions and a juvenile fire setter intervention program.

== Minimum requirements ==
To receive a PPC, a fire department must meet minimum infrastructure, staffing and equipment requirements. If a department doesn't meet at least one of the following requirements, then they are assigned a Class 10 rating.

=== Organization ===
- Formal fire department organized under state or local laws.
- Must have one person responsible for the operation of the department (example: Chief).
- Service area must have definite boundaries.
- For departments that service multiple communities, a written contract must be present.

=== Membership ===
- The department must respond at least four firefighters to structure fires. The chief may account for one of those required positions.

=== Training ===
- The department must conduct at least two hours of training every two months for active firefighters.

=== Alarm notification ===
- There must be no delay in receiving alarms and dispatching firefighters/apparatus.

=== Housing ===
- Apparatus must have adequate housing, as to protect it from weather.
