= Farmland Downtown Historic District =

Historic district in Indiana, United States

- U.S. National Register of Historic Places
- U.S. Historic district
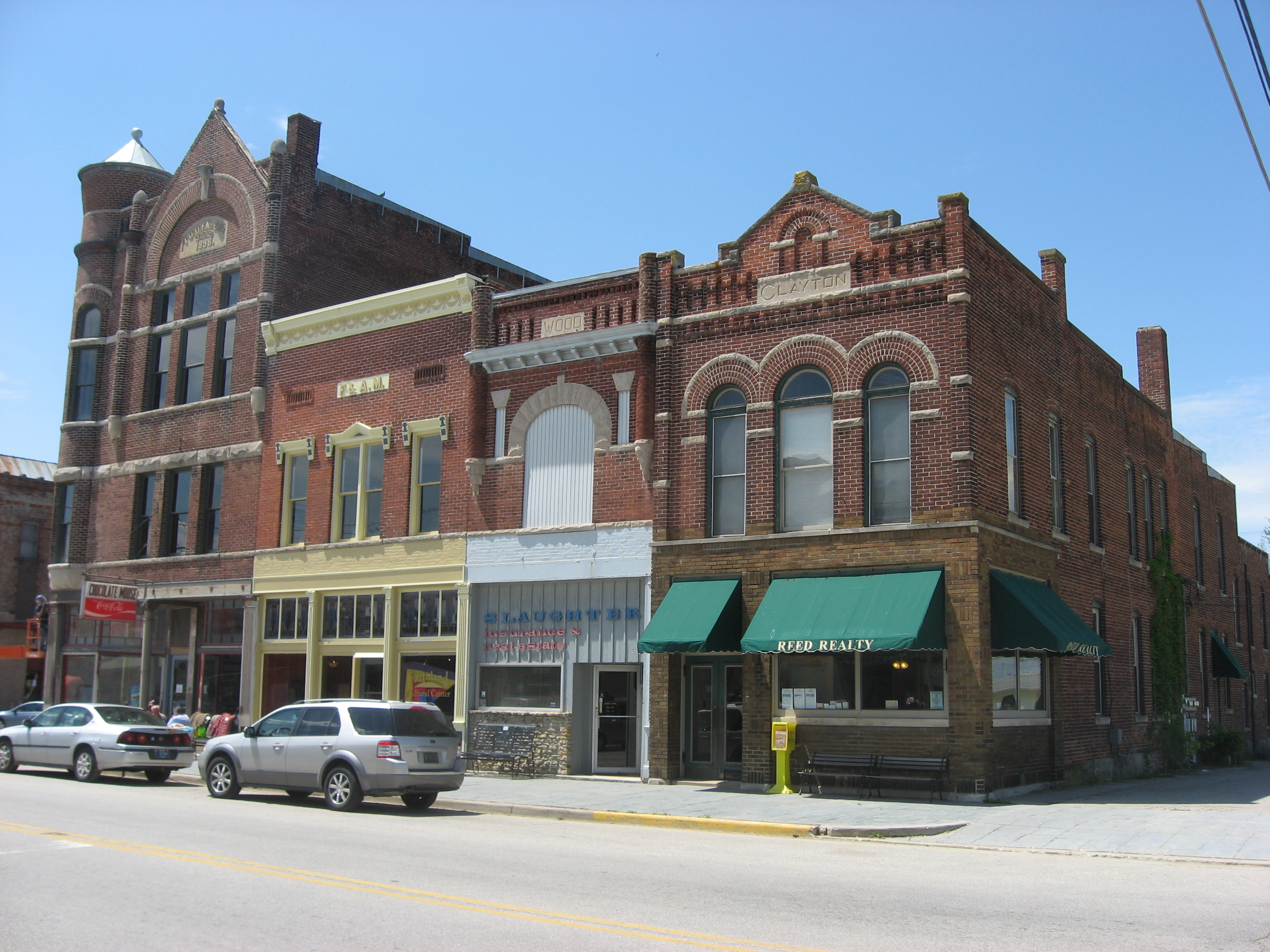
- Farmland Downtown Historic District, May 2010

- Location within Indiana Location within the United States
- Location: Main St. from the alley S of Henry St. to William St., Farmland, Indiana
- Coordinates: 40°11′27″N 85°07′42″W
- Area: 5.3 acres (2.1 ha)
- Built: 1898
- Architect: Kaufman, William S.
- Architectural style: Multiple
- NRHP reference No.: 94001124
- Added to NRHP: September 8, 1994

Farmland Downtown Historic District is a national historic district located at Farmland, Indiana.

The district encompasses 26 contributing buildings in the central business district of Farmland. The district developed between about 1880 and 1944 and includes notable examples of Italianate, Renaissance Revival, Romanesque Revival, Commercial style, and Bungalow / American Craftsman style architecture.

Notable buildings include the I.O.O.F. building (1898), Retter Hotel (c. 1860, 1920), Goodrich Brothers grain elevator (1919), Clayton Block (1899), McCormick and Yount Hardware Store (c. 1880), Knights of Pythias Building (1908), Farmland City Building (1923), The Opera House (c. 1885), and J.W. Clayton Building (1898, c. 1920).

It was added to the National Register of Historic Places in 1994.
