= Winchester Residential Historic District =

Historic district in Indiana, United States

- U.S. National Register of Historic Places
- U.S. Historic district
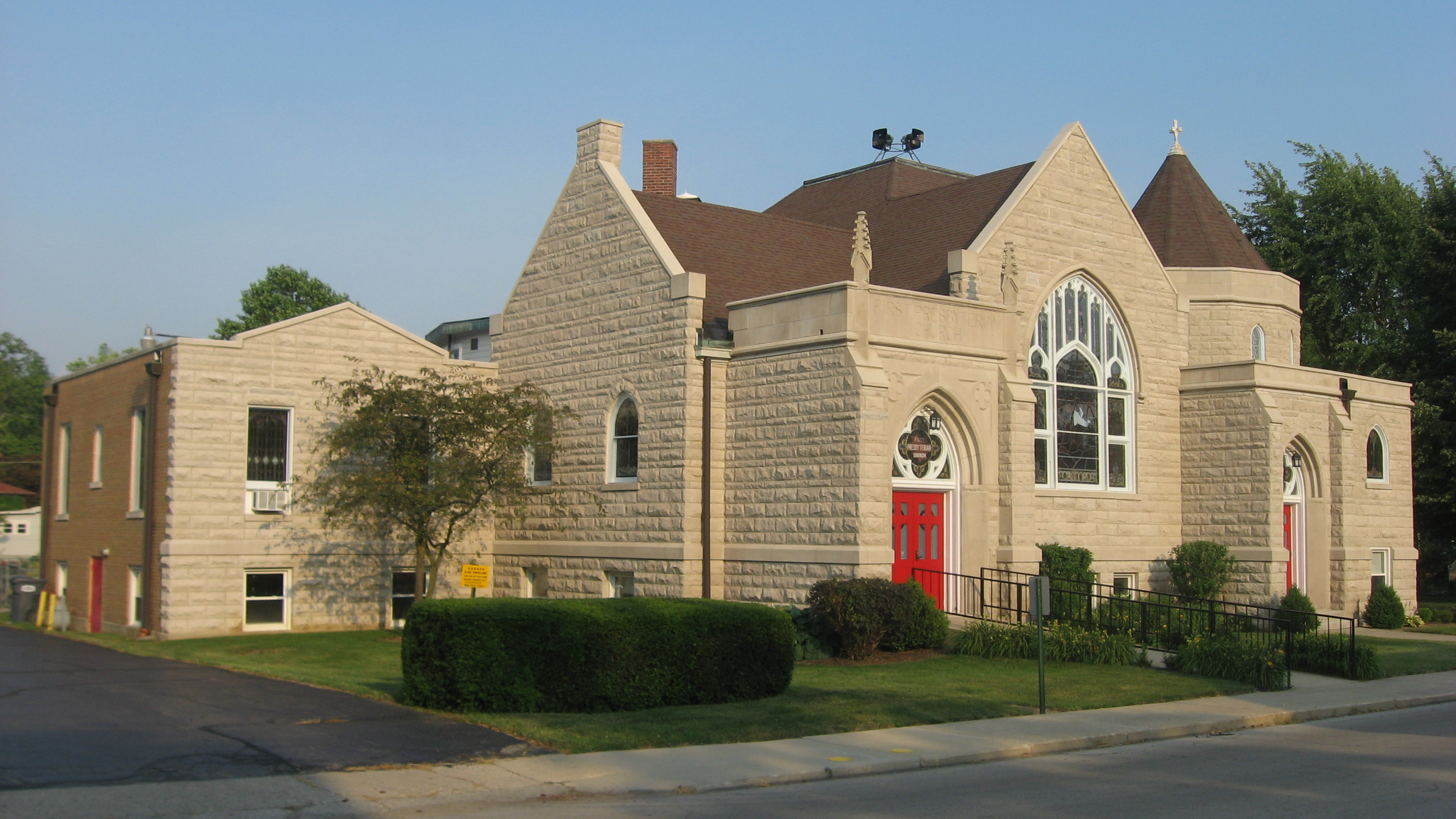
- First Presbyterian Church of Winchester, July 2011

- Location within Indiana Location within the United States
- Location: Roughly both sides of Washington and Franklin Sts. from Main St. to Greenville Ave. and both sides of Meridian and Main Sts., Winchester, Indiana
- Coordinates: 40°10′20″N 84°58′44″W
- Area: 56 acres (23 ha)
- Built: 1837
- Architectural style: Italianate, Romanesque, et.al.
- NRHP reference No.: 11000123
- Added to NRHP: March 21, 2011

Winchester Residential Historic District is a national historic district located at Winchester, Indiana. The district encompasses 142 contributing buildings, one contributing site, and one contributing structure in a predominantly residential section of Winchester. The district developed between about 1837 and 1950 and includes notable examples of Greek Revival, Italianate, Romanesque Revival, Colonial Revival, Prairie School, and Classical Revival style architecture. Notable buildings include the First Presbyterian Church of Winchester (1903), Winchester Friends Church (1897), First United Methodist Church (1900), Main Street Christian Church (1912), First Church of the Nazarene (1929), Carey Goodrich House (1858), Kizer-Marsh House (c. 1870), and W.E. Miller House (1910).

It was added to the National Register of Historic Places in 2011.
