= Winchester, Indiana =

Winchester
- City
- City of Winchester
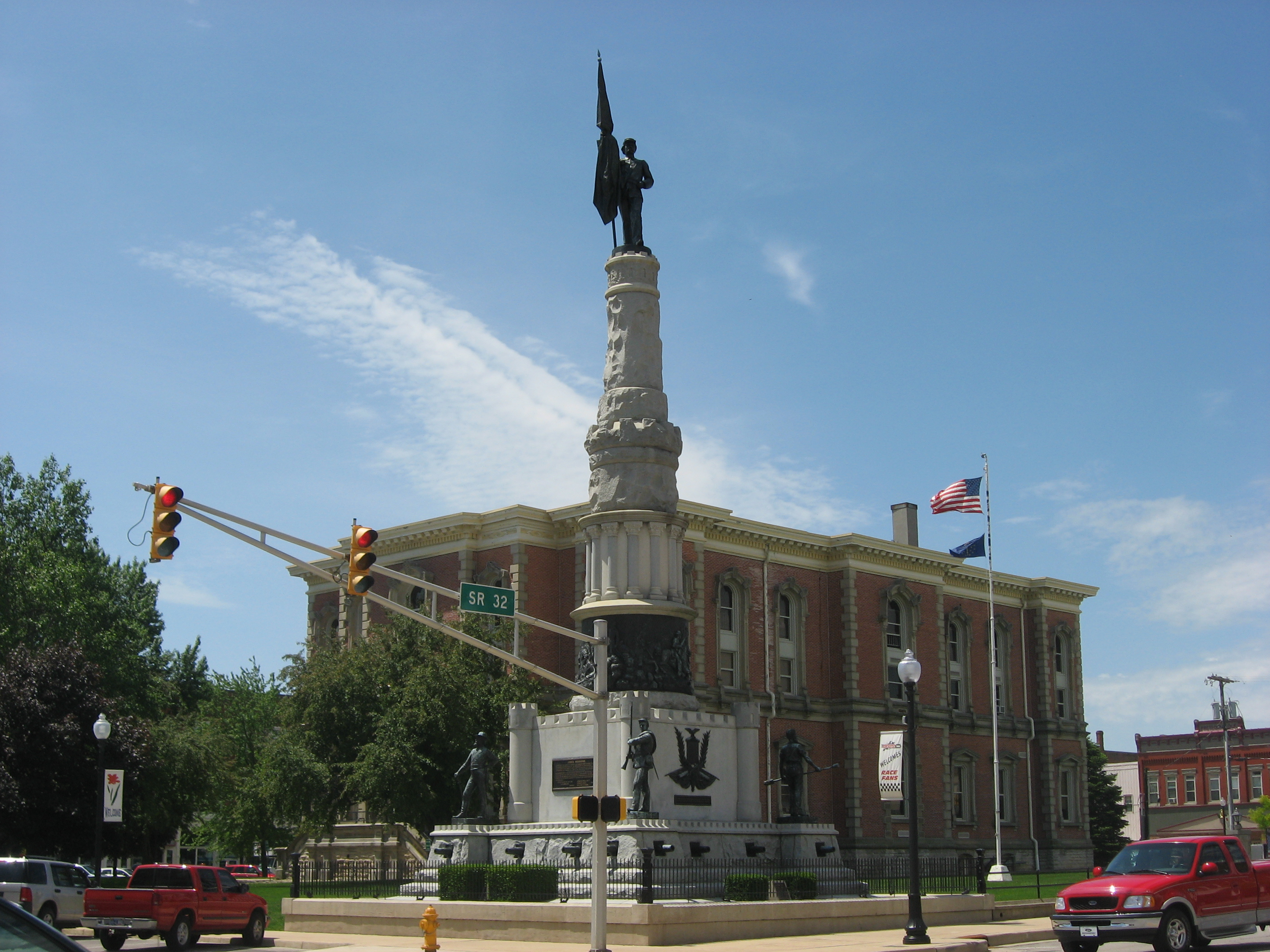
- Randolph County Courthouse and veterans' monument in downtown Winchester

- Seal
- Nicknames: Dub – C (WC), Sugar Cream Pie Capital
- Location of Winchester in Randolph County, Indiana.

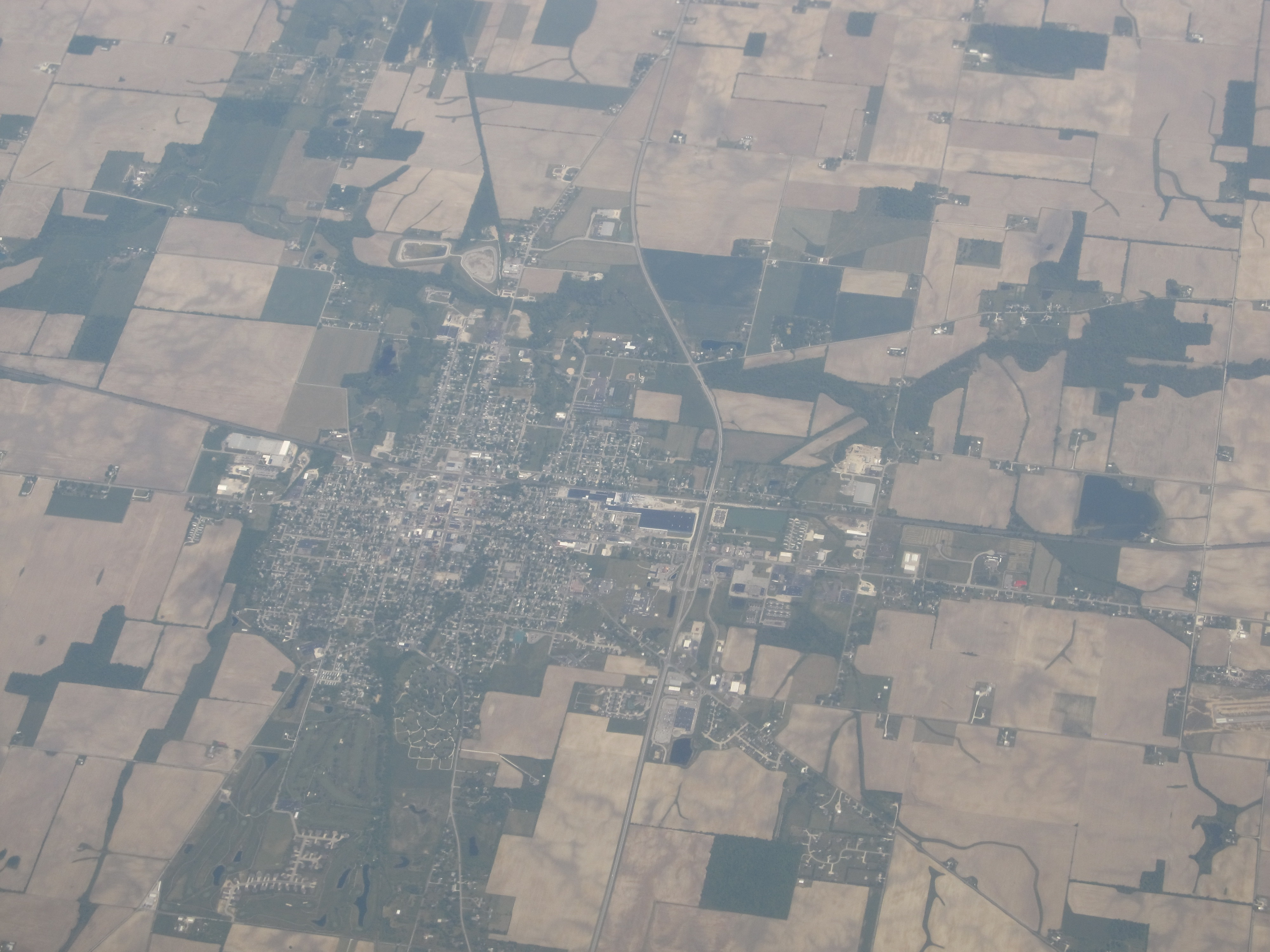
- Birds-eye view of Winchester
- Coordinates: 40°10′19″N 84°58′35″W
- Country: United States
- State: Indiana
- County: Randolph
- Township: White River
- Named for: Winchester, Hampshire

Government
  - Mayor: Robert (Bob) McCoy (R)

Area
  - Total: 3.47 sq mi (8.99 km^{2})
  - Land: 3.46 sq mi (8.96 km^{2})
  - Water: 0.012 sq mi (0.03 km^{2})
- Elevation: 1,093 ft (333 m)

Population (2020)
  - Total: 4,843
  - Estimate (2025): 4,722 ▼
  - Density: 1,400.3/sq mi (540.66/km^{2})
- Time zone: UTC-5 (EST)
  - Summer (DST): UTC-4 (EDT)
- ZIP code: 47394
- Area code: 765
- FIPS code: 18-84752
- GNIS feature ID: 2397335
- Website: www.winchester-in.gov

Winchester is a city in White River Township, Randolph County, Indiana, United States. The city is the county seat of Randolph County. The population was 4,843 at the 2020 census. It is the home of Winchester Speedway.

== History ==
Winchester was laid out in 1818 as the county seat of Randolph County, after five early settlers donated land for that purpose; the town was almost certainly named for Winchester, Virginia. The County government was organized in August of that year in the cabin of Benjamin Cox, a Quaker settler from North Carolina. A post office has been in operation at Winchester since 1820.

During the mid-1800s, Randolph County, and thus Winchester, became notable for its role in abolitionism and the Underground Railroad. The county was home to three distinct settlements of free African Americans, and documentary evidence shows that many local homes and churches served as stops on the Underground Railroad.

With the discovery of oil, natural gas, and other resources in the late 1800s, and 1890s in eastern Indiana, Winchester transitioned from a rural county seat into an industrial town. The local availability of fuel from natural gas and oil wells enabled furnaces in which glassmaking could thrive. These developments made Winchester a center of glass production, part of the broader Indiana Gas Boom era, as factories requiring high heat for glass-blowing setup operations, providing many jobs for local residents.

The Gen. Asahel Stone Mansion, Winchester Courthouse Square Historic District, and Winchester Residential Historic District are listed on the National Register of Historic Places.

=== 2024 tornado outbreak ===
At 7:58pm on March 14, 2024, a quarter-mile wide EF3 tornado hit Winchester during a severe weather outbreak. Severe damage was dealt to the Goodwill, The Lodge at Summers Pointe, and Strip Mall. The Freedom Life Church and Taco Bell were flattened. Thirty-eight were injured and three were left critically injured; one of the three died weeks later.

As of June 2024, three months after the tornado's touchdown, the remainder of the Strip Mall was demolished as a result of its ultimate destruction from the tornado. It was subsequently rebuilt into a Wendy's restaurant about a year later. Summers Pointe and Taco Bell both underwent repairs and eventually reopened.

A similar situation occurred at 5:53 pm on May 13, 2025, when an EFU landspout tornado touched down unexpectedly near the area but caused no damage.

== Geography ==
According to the 2010 census, Winchester has a total area of 3.343 square miles (8.66 km^{2}), of which 3.33 square miles (8.62 km^{2}) (or 99.61%) is land and 0.013 square miles (0.03 km^{2}) (or 0.39%) is water.

== Demographics ==
Historical population
Census	Pop.	Note	%±
1850	532		—
1870	1,456		—
1880	1,958		34.5%
1890	3,014		53.9%
1900	3,705		22.9%
1910	4,266		15.1%
1920	4,021		−5.7%
1930	4,487		11.6%
1940	5,303		18.2%
1950	5,467		3.1%
1960	5,742		5.0%
1970	5,493		−4.3%
1980	5,659		3.0%
1990	5,095		−10.0%
2000	5,037		−1.1%
2010	4,935		−2.0%
2020	4,843		−1.9%
2025 (est.)	4,722		−2.5%
U.S. Decennial Census

=== 2020 census ===
As of the 2020 census, Winchester had a population of 4,843. The median age was 41.2 years. 22.2% of residents were under the age of 18 and 22.6% of residents were 65 years of age or older. For every 100 females there were 93.8 males, and for every 100 females age 18 and over there were 89.2 males age 18 and over.

98.7% of residents lived in urban areas, while 1.3% lived in rural areas.

There were 2,087 households in Winchester, of which 25.7% had children under the age of 18 living in them. Of all households, 38.4% were married-couple households, 20.2% were households with a male householder and no spouse or partner present, and 32.6% were households with a female householder and no spouse or partner present. About 37.2% of all households were made up of individuals and 17.4% had someone living alone who was 65 years of age or older.

There were 2,370 housing units, of which 11.9% were vacant. The homeowner vacancy rate was 2.3% and the rental vacancy rate was 9.7%.

Racial composition as of the 2020 census
Race	Number	Percent
White	4,490	92.7%
Black or African American	37	0.8%
American Indian and Alaska Native	10	0.2%
Asian	38	0.8%
Native Hawaiian and Other Pacific Islander	0	0.0%
Some other race	69	1.4%
Two or more races	199	4.1%
Hispanic or Latino (of any race)	127	2.6%

=== 2010 census ===
At the 2010 census there were 4,935 people, 2,051 households, and 1,281 families living in the city. The population density was 1,482.0 inhabitants per square mile (572.2/km^{2}). There were 2,349 housing units at an average density of 705.4 per square mile (272.4/km^{2}). The racial makeup of the city was 96.1% White, 0.5% African American, 0.5% Native American, 0.5% Asian, 1.3% from other races, and 1.1% from two or more races. Hispanic or Latino of any race were 2.6%.

Of the 2,051 households 30.2% had children under the age of 18 living with them, 43.1% were married couples living together, 14.3% had a female householder with no husband present, 5.0% had a male householder with no wife present, and 37.5% were non-families. 32.2% of households were one person and 14.9% were one person aged 65 or older. The average household size was 2.32 and the average family size was 2.89.

The median age was 40.2 years. 23.6% of residents were under the age of 18; 8.3% were between the ages of 18 and 24; 23.8% were from 25 to 44; 25.4% were from 45 to 64; and 18.9% were 65 or older. The gender makeup of the city was 47.6% male and 52.4% female.

=== 2000 census ===
At the 2000 census there were 5,037 people, 2,171 households, and 1,350 families living in the city. The population density was 1,623.8 inhabitants per square mile (627.0/km^{2}). There were 2,377 housing units at an average density of 766.3 per square mile (295.9/km^{2}). The racial makeup of the city was 98.31% White, 0.24% African American, 0.26% Native American, 0.30% Asian, 0.32% from other races, and 0.58% from two or more races. Hispanic or Latino of any race were 1.41%.

Of the 2,171 households 27.4% had children under the age of 18 living with them, 48.1% were married couples living together, 10.5% had a female householder with no husband present, and 37.8% were non-families. 33.7% of households were one person, and 16.2% were one person aged 65 or older. The average household size was 2.23 and the average family size was 2.83.

In the city the population was spread out, with 22.2% under the age of 18, 8.9% from 18 to 24, 27.4% from 25 to 44, 22.0% from 45 to 64, and 19.6% 65 or older. The median age was 40 years. For every 100 females, there were 88.7 males. For every 100 females age 18 and over, there were 84.9 males.

The median household income was $28,500 and the median family income was $37,607. Males had a median income of $28,947 versus $22,226 for females. The per capita income for the city was $17,753. About 10.9% of families and 15.0% of the population were below the poverty line, including 20.2% of those under age 18 and 6.9% of those age 65 or over.

== Education ==
It is in the Randolph Central School Corporation. Schools, all part of the Randolph public school district, include:

- O.R. Baker Elementary School
- Willard Elementary School
- Driver Middle School
- Winchester Community High School

The town has a lending library, the Winchester Community Public Library.

== Notable people ==
- Thomas McLelland Browne, lawyer, prosecutor, Union Army officer, and politician
- Harold Falls (1909–2006), ophthalmologic geneticist, was born in Winchester
- James P. Goodrich, Governor of Indiana, 1917–1921, born in Winchester
- Randy Jo Hobbs, musician born in Winchester
- I. Marlene King, creator of the ABC Family original series Pretty Little Liars
- Greg Leffler, Indy car driver
- Troy Puckett, pitcher for the Philadelphia Phillies in 1911, born in Winchester
- James Eli Watson, U. S. Senator
- Robert Wise, film director, born in Winchester
