= Cabin Creek, Indiana =

Stream and settlement in Indiana, US

Cabin Creek
- Etymology: after local Native American cabins

Location
- Country: United States
- State: Indiana
- Region: Randolph County

Physical characteristics
- Source
  - coordinates: 40°03′50″N 85°04′05″W
- Mouth
  - location: White River
  - coordinates: 40°10′07″N 085°09′45″W

Cabin Creek is a creek in Randolph County, Indiana. In the 19th century it was the location of the Cabin Creek (Colored) Settlement, a settlement of African Americans, some escaping slavery. The settlement was exclusively a farming one; there was no town.

== Geography ==
The creek is west of Huntsville, Indiana. Its headwaters are some 6 miles (9.7 km) north of the southern border of Randolph county, and it flows roughly north-west through White River and Stoney Creek Townships to some 4 miles (6.4 km) over the border into Delaware County to reach its confluence with the White River.

Lamb Ditch (40°07′16″N 085°07′46″W) is a canal that leads from a confluence with Cabin Creek at 40°08′38″N 85°08′02″W to Scott Corner at 40°05′31″N 85°07′37″W. The latter's name derives from Robert Scott, who was born enslaved in Guilford County, North Carolina in 1770. After gaining his freedom, he moved in 1821 to Wayne County, Indiana, then in 1832 to what would become known as Scott's Corner. The "corner" in the name marks the location of a grocery store owned by Eleazer Scott, a grandson of Robert. (Note: Robert's son was Martin Scott, who was born in North Carolina and folloed his father in 1827, to live in Nettle Creek.)

The name Cabin Creek itself is recorded by settler Solomon Wright as being given, on a trip with his father to the residence of a David Connor, below Wheeling, when they saw a group of Native American cabins on the riverbank and an unnamed fellow traveller decided to name it after them.

There was a water mill at the creek mouth in 1882, the area where Solomon Wright and his sister Lydia Jones then lived. It had originally been a saw mill built by a Mr Bunker, then rebuilt as a sawmill and grist mill by John H. Bond, then again rebuilt by William Roberts (initially steam-powered, but later merely water-powered, and later discontinuing the sawmill) sometime after 1854 who sold it to Dick and Cowgill. Other erstwhile mills on the creek included a grist mill 0.75 miles (1.21 km) of the mouth, built by Jacob Boles, which likewise was rebuilt several times, including by William Marine in 1844, and at one point was owned by Solomon Wright, being owned by Studebaker in 1882; and a second one built by William Marine in 1839. (Note: At one point a man named Philip K. Dick, born in Ohio on 1824-11-21 and living in a farm near Farmland post-office from 1848, had a part interest in one of the grist mills.)

Other members of the Wright family in the area were Hominy John Wright, Solomon's father, who lived at a creek crossing 2.5 miles (4.0 km) west of Winchester. One of the earliest bridges in Randolph was on Cabin Creek on the road leading westwards to Windsor, although there was still a ford on the creek in 1882 near to Unionsport.

== Settlement ==
The Cabin Creek Settlement was a station on the underground railroad, that stretched along its namesake creek for several miles, at its peak being 7 by 2 miles (11.3 by 3.2 km) in length and width. It was settled not long after the first African American settlement in Randolph, Greenville Settlement, was settled in 1822, and passed through (then) West River, Stoney Creek, and Nettle Creek Townships.

Its first African American settlers began arriving after 1825, coming from Virginia, and North Carolina; and its population rapidly swelled to several hundred people in one hundred families. Its first African American settler was John Demory, who arrived with Lemuel Vestal from North Carolina. They were followed by the families of Drew Taylor, from Eight Mile Creek; Obadiah Anderson; Richard Robbins; Samual Outland; and Benjamin Outland. The came Robert Scott; Edward Outland; Benjamin Skipworth; Dosha Smothers, recorded as accompanied by "a large family of girls"; and several more families including several more Woods and Scotts.

Although not a town, with all of these settlers creating farms, the settlement had a Baptist church, which had declined in the middle of the 19th century but had revived again by 1882; three rural school districts with schoolhouses, shrinking to just one by 1882; and an African Methodist Episcopal church. Schooling was initially private, segregated, and community funded with the aid of Quaker, Methodist, and Baptist churches. The public school system established in Indiana in 1852 had not admitted Black children, although by 1855 one public school in Cabin Creek had admitted some, and by 1882 several had.

Solomon Wright, John H. Bond, Amos Bond, and others were all anti-slavery Quakers, the local Quakers in the Creek splitting from other Quakers in 1843, and there was a Quaker cemetery on the Creek. The M.E. church, named the Cabin Creek (Colored) Methodist Episcopal church was organized in 1833, initially at a graveyard south of where (until 1865) the Poplar Run Friends Meeting-House was, in a schoolhouse after the Meeting-House was demolished, and later in a dedicated 28 by 28 feet (8.5 by 8.5 m) church building. Benjamin Skipworth, and Benjamin and Samuel Outland were members of the church, amongst others. A Regular Union Baptist Church (Colored) was formed by Samuel Jones in 1843, initially run in a schoolhouse before the Baptist church building was constructed just south of the farm of James Scott.

John H. Bond's house at the mouth of the Creek near to the Winchester—Windsor road, was one that was used by the underground railroad. Bond was born the son of Joseph Bond in North Carolina in 1807 and moved to his farm in Stoney Creek Township in 1831. He was a trustee of a school in the Greenville Settlement. His brother Zimri had a farm there for a while, too, but after a business failure moved to Kansas in 1872.

=== Wilkerson girls ===
Levi Coffin recounted in his Reminiscences an tale of two enslaved girls, who had escaped from Tennessee to Cabin Creek, where they had free relatives (including their grandmother Milly Wilkerson), being defended from slave-hunters by the community so that they could escape capture and re-enslavement. They passed through John H. Bond's house on their way to Canada.

The slaver was a Methodist minister, who went on to sue at the court in Winchester a large number of the Cabin Creek residents for their parts in hindering him from re-enslaving the two Wilkerson girls, valuing them at US$1,200 (equivalent to $36,281 in 2025). He eventually abandoned the suit.

== See also ==
- Cabin Creek Raised Bog
