= Lee L. Driver =

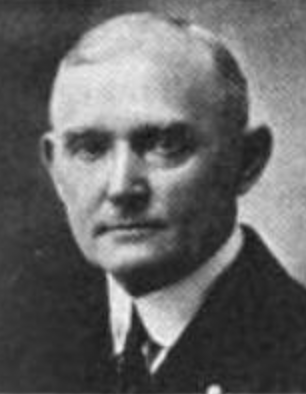
- Driver, from a 1922 publication
- Born: Leotis Lincoln Driver; February 22, 1867; Indiana, U.S.
- Died: October 21, 1960 (aged 93); Ocala, Florida, U.S.
- Occupations: Educator, school administrator, state education official

Leotis Lincoln Driver (February 22, 1867 – October 21, 1960), known as Lee L. Driver, was a nationally known educator and considered one of the leading experts in the field of rural school consolidation in the United States. He served for twelve years as county superintendent of schools in Randolph County, Indiana, where he made the county the national model in rural school consolidation. He later served as Director of the Bureau of Rural Education with the Pennsylvania Department of Public Instruction, where he oversaw the consolidation of several thousand schools.

== Early life ==
Leotis Lincoln Driver was born on February 22, 1867, in Stoney Creek Township, Randolph County, Indiana. His father, a veteran of the Iron Brigade, named him for Abraham Lincoln. Driver's youth was spent in the town of Farmland, Indiana, where he completed a common school education. He graduated from Central Normal College in Danville, Indiana, in 1883.

== Career ==
=== Indiana ===
Driver taught in the district schools of western Randolph County, farmed, and did carpentry work, until 1895, when he was hired to teach at Winchester High School in Winchester, Indiana. Driver was principal of Winchester High School from 1901 until 1907.

Lee L. Driver was elected county superintendent of schools of Randolph County, Indiana, in June 1907. When he assumed the office, the county had only one consolidated township high school and more than one hundred one-room schools. Over the course of the next twelve years, Driver would oversee the consolidation of all but nine of the county's one-room schools and the creation of fourteen additional consolidated township high schools and five consolidated township grade schools. Because of Driver's work, Randolph County was widely regarded as the model county in rural school consolidation and was given attention by men like Progressive reformer Ellwood P. Cubberley, U. S. Commissioner of Education Philander P. Claxton, Albert Winship, editor of Boston's Journal of Education, and others. He spoke about school consolidation at educational meetings around the United States, including a teachers' institute in Ohio in 1916.

=== Pennsylvania ===
When Governor William Cameron Sproul set out to reorganize the Pennsylvania Department of Public Instruction, he recruited Thomas E. Finnegan, of New York, to take charge of the department. Finnegan, in turn, was given freedom to recruit the best men in each area to oversee reforms. To oversee rural education, he selected Driver, who was the first Director of the new Bureau of Rural Education. Driver would serve in this capacity for seventeen years, surviving several political changes and overseeing the consolidation of more than 5000 schools through more than 800 separation consolidations. He retired from the Pennsylvania Department of Public Instruction in 1937.

== Personal life and legacy ==
Driver was married and had two sons, Herschel and Clarence. His wife died in 1937, and he died on October 21, 1960, in Ocala, Florida, at the age of 93. He is buried in the Woodlawn Cemetery in Maxville, near Farmland, Indiana.

A new elementary school, near Bradford, Pennsylvania, was named in his honor in 1931. In 1956 citizens in the western portion of Randolph County, Indiana, attempted to consolidate their schools as the Lee Driver Consolidated School District, though this attempt failed by the narrowest of margins. The high school and junior high school of Winchester, Indiana, were named in Driver's honor in 1959. The junior high school, a middle school since 1984, still retains Driver's name. A historical marker about Driver was dedicated in 2009, in Winchester, Indiana; his grandson participated in the dedication ceremony.
