= ME's Zoo =

Defunct zoo in Indiana, United States

- Interactive map of ME's Zoo
- 40.1196°N 85.2090°W
- Date opened: 1988
- Date closed: September 27, 2009
- Location: Parker City, Indiana
- Land area: 40 acres (16 ha)+
- No. of animals: 300+
- Annual visitors: 22,000
- Website: web.archive.org/web/20071229095307/http://meszoo.com

ME's Zoo was a privately owned zoo in Parker City, Indiana. The zoo covered over 40 acres (16 ha), and was home to more than 300 animals. ME's Zoo was especially popular in the weeks preceding Christmas, when the zoo grounds were decorated with more than 200,000 lights. The zoo closed on September 27, 2009.

== History ==
In 1988, ME's Zoo, Inc. opened to the public Memorial Day weekend with 45 animals covering 55 acres. The name was created from the first letters of the owners Max and Eileen Oren and the "s" for several people. In October 1986, Max was diagnosed with aplastic anemia. Max was only given a few weeks to live with this serious blood disorder but was offered experimental treatments that could prolong his life. He started treatments in January 1987. Believing this might be Max's last Christmas, his friends and neighbors decorated his property with over 10,000 lights to celebrate the Christmas season. Thousands of cars drove by the light display and the family began to receive cards and letters of encouragement.

Following the experimental treatments, Max was bedfast and receiving weekly blood transfusions. Max would speak of how many people drove out to the country farm to see the Holiday display of Christmas Lights and an idea was born. He was a very successful carnival game operator. He began to sell equipment and began to acquire more animals. One newspaper writer, Larry Shores, compared Max to the main character of the movie Field of Dreams. Once Max was healthy enough to be outside the Orens, friends and family built Max's dream a zoo.

In 1989, Max was diagnosed with acute myelogenous leukemia also known as acute myeloid leukemia (AML). For the next several years, he awaited for a suitable bone marrow transplant donor. Over the next several difficult years, Max would entertain kids with bird shows with his favorite parrots. On days he was not feeling well, he would sit outside the gift shop. He also began to write poetry Thank you, Thank you, From ME's Zoo and Maybe You Weren't Like Me.

ME's Zoo grew to over 300 exotic animals. The zoo hosted over 1,800 teachers and school-aged children a week during the spring. Paul Cross, the animal curator, would hold many educational programs with Zeus the lion and other animals. The "ME's Zoo House of Lights" grew to over 200,000 lights, with displays, figures, Santa on the outdoor fireplace gazebo, and Omar the camel. In 1990, Max and Omar drew national media attention when he rode Omar in protest of the office of the Indiana Civil Liberties Union in downtown Indianapolis to protest ICLU's actions to stop the live nativity scene at Monroe Central Elementary.

On December 20, 1993, Max D. Oren lost his long battle with leukemia. Eileen, Kim, Paul and many other family, friends, and volunteers continued Max's dream.

In 2003, Eileen married Bob Taylor, owner of Taylor Architects, Inc. Taylor loved the zoo and continued to help support Max's dream. He purchased two white Siberian tigers for the zoo.

The zoo was a fixture in East Central Indiana for a generation but closed on September 27, 2009.

== Operation ==
The zoo featured a wide array of animals, including primates, wild cats, bear, birds, llamas, deer, and reptiles. The zoo was open from 10 AM to 5 PM on Tuesdays, Wednesdays, Thursdays, and Saturdays, and from 12 PM to 5 PM on Sundays. It was closed on Mondays and Fridays.

Throughout its existence, the zoo continued the Christmas lights tradition, with a display of over 180,000 lights that would be up from Thanksgiving through Christmas.

== Facilities ==
In addition to the animal exhibits, the zoo included picnic areas, a 40-by-50-foot (12 by 15 m) shelter for outdoor parties, a playground, and a gift shop.

== Closing ==
A last-minute effort to relocate a Randolph County zoo (Me's Zoo) and a Parker City zoo (Me's Zoo) to Delaware County, where it could have drawn more visitors and become an economic development asset, had failed, and the zoo closed as scheduled September 27, 2009. The effort came too late in part because the zoo's animals already were promised to new owners and because the scope of the relocation – securing 100 acres (0.40 km^{2}) of land and establishing a new zoo at a cost of more than $3 million – was too big a financial hurdle. More than 60 animals were shipped out September 28, the day after the zoo closed. More followed. The owners report that they have found new homes for all of the animals except the bison, which they intend to keep. Taylor said he and Oren have offered to consult on creating a new zoo if that interest continues.
