= Cabin Creek Raised Bog =

Protected bog in Indiana, United States

- Location within Indiana Location within the United States
- Location: Randolph County, Indiana
- Nearest city: Winchester, IN
- Coordinates: 40°08′15″N 85°07′30″W
- Area: 40 acres (16 ha)
- Designated: 1975
- Governing body: National Park Service

The Cabin Creek Raised Bog is a 40-acre raised bog located in Randolph County, Indiana, near Farmland. Identified as one of the few post-glacial raised bogs remaining in the Eastern Deciduous Forest Province of the central United States, it was designated as a National Natural Landmark in 1975.

== Description ==
The Cabin Creek Raised Bog is an elevated fen, a peat-forming wetland characterized by alkaline water and soil. Its hydrology comes from artesian seeping water, rather than running water. It is rich in the living species adapted to fen life, many of which are rare or even endangered species because most of the fenlands of the United States have been altered or drained. When surveyed by the United States Fish and Wildlife Service (USFWS) in 1973–1974, the Cabin Creek Raised Bog contained elevations that were elevated as much as 10 feet above the surrounding floodplain. Local groundwater movements created an artesian flow that caused water to seep into the fen and its saturated peatland. The water is alkaline, having flowed through calcium-rich layers of gravel or stone.

The USFWS performed a biological inventory of the Cabin Creek Raised Bog, finding over 200 species of plant life within the 40-acre parcel. Key species were quaking aspen and prickly ash.

== See also ==
- Cabin Creek, Indiana
