= Randolph Farms Landfill =

Randolph Farms Landfill is a 120-acre (486,000 m^{2}) landfill owned by the Balkema family of Kalamazoo, Michigan, located in Modoc, Indiana. In addition to Randolph County, it serves Delaware, Madison, Jay, Wayne, and Henry counties in Indiana, as well as Darke and Miami counties in Ohio.

The owners of the landfill are, as of June 22, 2004, petitioning the Randolph County Board of Zoning Appeals to allow for an expansion, nearly three times its current size, in order that the landfill continue operation for another 50 years. Similar attempts at expansion were denied twice in the 1990s.

Opponents of expansion, in the majority in largely rural Randolph County, point out that only 6% of the trash in the landfill is from Randolph County, whereas most of it is from Miami County. The landfill could likely reach a height of 165 feet (50 m), which would make it not only one of the largest landfills in the state, but also the highest point of elevation in Indiana. The landfill would allegedly be visible for over a mile (2 km) away.

Randolph Farms was built on a limestone hill, directly over sand and gravel aquifers, near the drainage basins of White River and Whitewater River.

Opponents, citing the previous denials of expansion, say it should again be denied due to groundwater contamination, as well as increased traffic, odor, and lower aesthetics and property values. Organic farmers have claimed that toxins could affect their produce yields.

In the mid-1990s, groundwater monitoring wells detected low levels of volatile organic compounds, due to the landfill gas produced by the landfill. Tests dating to 1999 show that the high permeability of the underground aquifer point to a high risk for water pollution.

== See also ==
- Landfill in the United States
