= New Pittsburg =

New Pittsburg may refer to:

- New Pittsburg, Indiana
- New Pittsburg, Ohio
