= Unionport =

Unionport may refer to:

- Unionport, Indiana, an unincorporated community in Randolph County
- Unionport, Ohio, an unincorporated community in Jefferson County
- Unionport,The Bronx is a residential neighborhood in a borough of New York City
