= Union School Corporation =

School district in Indiana, United States

Union School Corporation is a school district in Indiana.

Much of its territory is in Union Township, Randolph County, where it includes Modoc and Losantville. A portion is in Stoney Creek Township, Henry County, where it includes Blountsville.

It has two physical schools: Union Elementary School and Union Junior and High School. Both share a single building. In 2025, these schools combined had 290 students. The district also has virtual education programs. In 2025 the virtual programs had a sum of around 7,500 students.

The Rockets are the school district's mascot.

== History ==
The school district formed in 1951. The school district initially had schools in Huntsville, Losantville, and Modoc. High school students were consolidated into the Modoc facility. In Fall 1957 a consolidated school building was scheduled to open, while the three previous buildings were to be sold that summer.

In 2014 the district board of trustees began looking at consolidating with another school district, citing fewer students and less money available.

Circa April 2025 the Indiana House of Representatives created a bill to change Indiana property taxes, and the Indiana Senate approved the bill. The bill includes a provision for dissolving this school district. The bill calls for the dissolution to be effective in 2027. J.D. Prescott (R-Union City), a member of the Indiana House, wrote the bill. Galen Mast, the superintendent, argued that the reason why the bill was written to close the district was because it had the online learning services. The members of the Indiana Legislature did not consult citizens as the bill advanced.
