= Cherry Grove =

Cherry Grove may refer to:

== United States ==
- Cherry Grove, Indiana, an unincorporated community
- Cherry Grove Cemetery, in McVey Memorial Forest, Indiana
- Cherry Grove (Woodbine, Maryland), a farm
- Cherry Grove Township, Michigan, a township
- Cherry Grove, Minnesota, an unincorporated community
- Cherry Grove Township, Goodhue County, Minnesota
- Cherry Grove (Crystal Springs, Mississippi), in the National Register of Historic Places listings in Mississippi
- Cherry Grove Plantation, Natchez, Mississippi
- Cherry Grove, New York, an unincorporated hamlet on Fire Island
- Cherry Grove, Caswell County, North Carolina, an unincorporated community
- Cherry Grove, Columbus County, North Carolina, an unincorporated community
- Cherry Grove Beach, South Carolina, a neighborhood of the city of North Myrtle Beach sometimes known as Cherry Grove
- Cherry Grove, Ohio, a census-designated place
- Cherry Grove, Oregon, an unincorporated community
- Cherry Grove Township, Warren County, Pennsylvania
- Cherry Grove, Washington, a census-designated place
- Cherry Grove, West Virginia, an unincorporated community

== Canada ==
- Cherry Grove, Alberta, a hamlet
- Cherry Grove, Ontario, a community in the municipality of Thames Centre

== Barbados ==
- Cherry Grove, Barbados, a populated place

== See also ==
- Cherry Grove-Shannon Township, Carroll County, Illinois
