= Losantville, Indiana =

- Town
- Town of Losantville
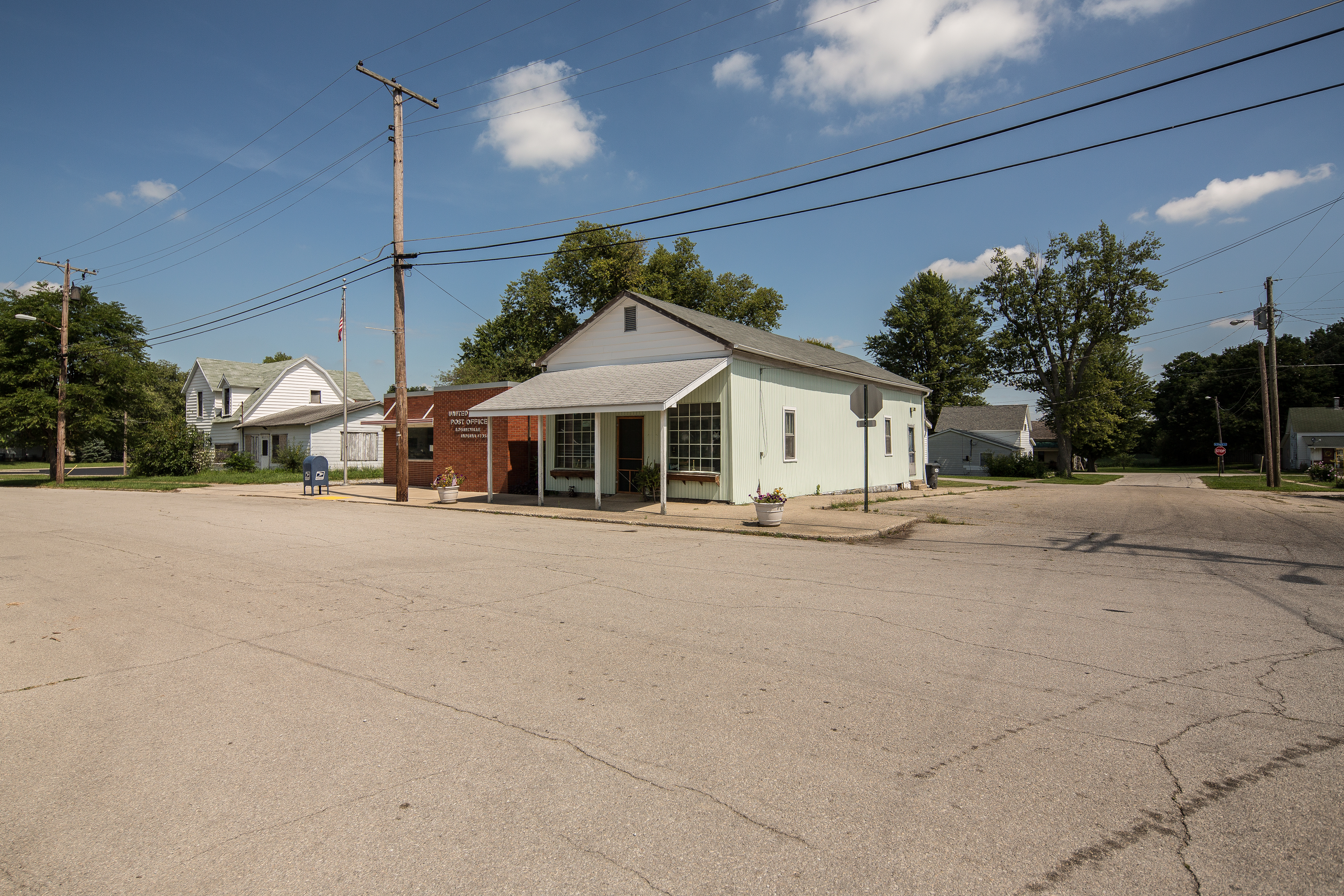

- Location of Losantville in Randolph County, Indiana.
- Coordinates: 40°01′25″N 85°11′00″W
- Country: United States
- State: Indiana
- County: Randolph
- Township: Union

Area
  - Total: 0.19 sq mi (0.49 km^{2})
  - Land: 0.19 sq mi (0.49 km^{2})
  - Water: 0 sq mi (0.00 km^{2})
- Elevation: 1,139 ft (347 m)

Population (2020)
  - Total: 221
  - Estimate (2025): 215 ▼
  - Density: 1,171.7/sq mi (452.38/km^{2})
- Time zone: UTC-5 (EST)
  - Summer (DST): UTC-4 (EDT)
- ZIP code: 47354
- Area code: 765
- FIPS code: 18-45000
- GNIS feature ID: 2396725

Losantville is a town in Union Township, Randolph County, in the U.S. state of Indiana. The population was 221 at the 2020 census.

== History ==
Losantville was first known as Hunts Cross Roads, and under the latter name was platted in 1851. The present name is derived from Losantiville, an early name for Cincinnati, Ohio. A post office called Losantville has been in operation since 1854.

== Geography ==
According to the 2010 census, Losantville has a total area of 0.19 square miles (0.49 km^{2}), all land.

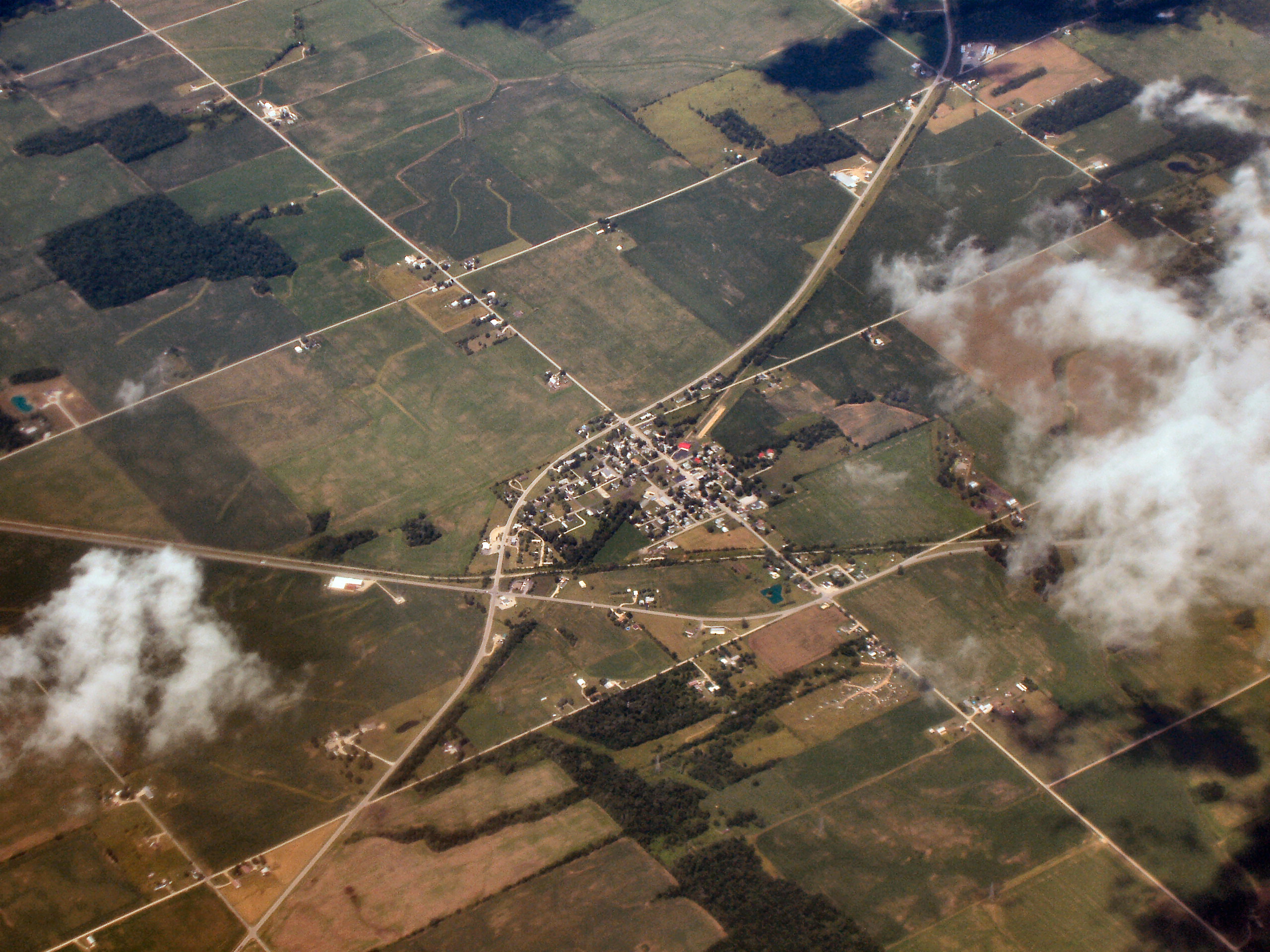
Losantville from above

== Demographics ==
Historical population
Census	Pop.	Note	%±
1880	52		—
1900	177		—
1910	300		69.5%
1920	321		7.0%
1930	252		−21.5%
1940	253		0.4%
1950	247		−2.4%
1960	251		1.6%
1970	212		−15.5%
1980	306		44.3%
1990	253		−17.3%
2000	280		10.7%
2010	237		−15.4%
2020	221		−6.8%
2025 (est.)	215	▼	−2.7%
U.S. Decennial Census

=== 2010 census ===
As of the census of 2010, there were 237 people, 105 households, and 63 families living in the town. The population density was 1,247.4 inhabitants per square mile (481.6/km^{2}). There were 124 housing units at an average density of 652.6 per square mile (252.0/km^{2}). The racial makeup of the town was 97.0% White, 0.4% Native American, and 2.5% from two or more races.

There were 105 households, of which 29.5% had children under the age of 18 living with them, 47.6% were married couples living together, 8.6% had a female householder with no husband present, 3.8% had a male householder with no wife present, and 40.0% were non-families. 31.4% of all households were made up of individuals, and 15.2% had someone living alone who was 65 years of age or older. The average household size was 2.26 and the average family size was 2.87.

The median age in the town was 37.4 years. 23.2% of residents were under the age of 18; 8% were between the ages of 18 and 24; 29.5% were from 25 to 44; 22.8% were from 45 to 64; and 16.5% were 65 years of age or older. The gender makeup of the town was 49.8% male and 50.2% female.

=== 2000 census ===
As of the census of 2000, there were 280 people, 115 households, and 76 families living in the town. The population density was 1,584.8 inhabitants per square mile (611.9/km^{2}). There were 124 housing units at an average density of 701.9 per square mile (271.0/km^{2}). The racial makeup of the town was 100.00% White.

There were 115 households, out of which 32.2% had children under the age of 18 living with them, 53.0% were married couples living together, 9.6% had a female householder with no husband present, and 33.9% were non-families. 28.7% of all households were made up of individuals, and 14.8% had someone living alone who was 65 years of age or older. The average household size was 2.43 and the average family size was 3.03.

In the town, the population was spread out, with 29.6% under the age of 18, 7.5% from 18 to 24, 26.1% from 25 to 44, 20.7% from 45 to 64, and 16.1% who were 65 years of age or older. The median age was 34 years. For every 100 females, there were 91.8 males. For every 100 females age 18 and over, there were 87.6 males.

The median income for a household in the town was $30,000, and the median income for a family was $36,250. Males had a median income of $32,222 versus $21,607 for females. The per capita income for the town was $12,885. About 16.0% of families and 15.8% of the population were below the poverty line, including 24.1% of those under the age of eighteen and 12.5% of those 65 or over.

== Education ==
It is in the Union School Corporation. The comprehensive public secondary school of that district is Union Junior and High School.

== Notable people ==
Losantville is the birthplace of former major league baseball player Claude Berry, a catcher for the Chicago White Sox, Philadelphia A's and Pittsburgh Rebels from 1904 through 1915. He had a lifetime batting average of .219.
