= Rural, Indiana =

- Unincorporated community
- Location within Indiana Location within the United States
- Coordinates: 40°06′24″N 84°57′58″W
- Country: United States
- State: Indiana
- County: Randolph
- Township: Washington
- Elevation: 1,175 ft (358 m)
- Time zone: UTC-5 (Eastern (EST))
  - Summer (DST): UTC-4 (EDT)
- ZIP code: 47394
- Area code: 765
- GNIS feature ID: 442395

Rural is an unincorporated community in Washington Township, Randolph County, in the U.S. state of Indiana.

== History ==
Rural was originally called Wood Station, and under the latter name was founded in about 1870 when the railroad was extended to that point. A post office was established under the name Rural in 1874, and it remained in operation until 1907.
