= Union Township, Randolph County, Indiana =

Union Township
- Township
- Location of Union Township
- Coordinates: 40°2′39″N 85°7′41″W
- Country: United States
- State: Indiana
- County: Randolph

Government
  - Type: Indiana township

Area
  - Total: 71.65 sq mi (185.6 km^{2})
  - Land: 71.52 sq mi (185.2 km^{2})
  - Water: 0.13 sq mi (0.34 km^{2})
- Elevation: 1,150 ft (350 m)

Population (2020)
  - Total: 1,965
  - Density: 30/sq mi (12/km^{2})
- Time zone: UTC-5 (Eastern (EST))
  - Summer (DST): UTC-4 (EDT)
- Area code: 765
- FIPS code: 18-77588
- GNIS feature ID: 453931

Union Township is one of eleven townships in Randolph County, Indiana, which contains the towns of Modoc and Losantville. As of the 2020 census, its population was 1,965 (down from 2,142 at 2010) and it contained 902 housing units.

== History ==
Union Township was established on 1 January 1951 from the merger of Nettle Creek Township and West River Township.

Confusingly, another Union Township was proposed in Randolph County in 1838. This Union Township was either short lived or was never formed. It would have consisted of the northern half of the existing West River Township

== Geography ==
According to the 2010 census, the township has a total area of 71.65 square miles (185.6 km^{2}), of which 71.52 square miles (185.2 km^{2}) (or 99.82%) is land and 0.13 square miles (0.34 km^{2}) (or 0.18%) is water.

=== Cities and towns ===
- Losantville
- Modoc

=== Unincorporated towns ===
- Huntsville at 40.0711567°N 85.0721876°W
- Unionport at 40.1208783°N 85.0963553°W

(This list is based on USGS data and may include former settlements.)

=== Former settlements ===
- Cabin Creek — an erstwhile farming settlement and station on the underground railroad

== Education ==
It is in the Union School Corporation.

== Cemeteries ==
Union Township has nine cemeteries:

- Buena Vista Cemetery
- Huntsville Cemetery
- Little Creek Cemetery
- Nettle Creek Baptist Cemetery
- Riverside Cemetery
- Salem Cemetery
- Scott Cemetery
- Union Baptist Cemetery
- Union Chapel Cemetery

== Major highways ==
- U.S. Route 36
- U.S. Route 35
- Indiana State Road 1
