= Harrisville, Indiana =

- Unincorporated community
- Location within Indiana Location within the United States
- Coordinates: 40°11′05″N 84°52′54″W
- Country: United States
- State: Indiana
- County: Randolph
- Township: Wayne
- Elevation: 1,102 ft (336 m)
- Time zone: UTC-5 (Eastern (EST))
  - Summer (DST): UTC-4 (EDT)
- ZIP code: 47390
- Area code: 765
- GNIS feature ID: 435807

Harrisville is an unincorporated community in Wayne Township, Randolph County, in the U.S. state of Indiana.

== History ==
Harrisville was platted in 1854 by J. Harris, and named for him. A post office was established at Harrisville in 1854, and remained in operation until 1920.
