= Carlos, Indiana =

- Unincorporated community
- Location within Indiana Location within the United States
- Coordinates: 40°01′35″N 85°02′04″W
- Country: United States
- State: Indiana
- County: Randolph
- Township: Washington
- Elevation: 1,211 ft (369 m)
- Time zone: UTC-5 (Eastern (EST))
  - Summer (DST): UTC-4 (EDT)
- ZIP code: 47355
- Area code: 765
- GNIS feature ID: 432134

Carlos is an unincorporated community in Washington Township, Randolph County, in the U.S. state of Indiana.

== History ==
A post office called Carlos City was established in 1882, the name was changed to Carlos in 1895, and the post office closed in 1976.
