= South Salem, Indiana =

- Unincorporated community
- Location within Indiana Location within the United States
- Coordinates: 40°09′04″N 84°50′28″W
- Country: United States
- State: Indiana
- County: Randolph
- Township: Wayne
- Elevation: 1,139 ft (347 m)
- Time zone: UTC-5 (Eastern (EST))
  - Summer (DST): UTC-4 (EDT)
- ZIP code: 47390
- Area code: 765
- GNIS feature ID: 443845

South Salem is an unincorporated community in Wayne Township, Randolph County, in the U.S. state of Indiana.

== History ==
South Salem was platted in 1849. An old variant name of the community was called Pollytown.
