= Shedville, Indiana =

- Unincorporated community
- Location within Indiana Location within the United States
- Coordinates: 40°15′56″N 85°07′44″W
- Country: United States
- State: Indiana
- County: Randolph
- Township: Green
- Elevation: 965 ft (294 m)
- Time zone: UTC-5 (Eastern (EST))
  - Summer (DST): UTC-4 (EDT)
- ZIP code: 47340
- Area code: 765
- GNIS feature ID: 443328

Shedville is an unincorporated community in Green Township, Randolph County, in the U.S. state of Indiana.

== History ==
An old variant name of the community was called Brinckley. A post office was established under this name in 1881, and remained in operation until 1901.
