= Green Township, Randolph County, Indiana =

Green Township
- Township
- Coordinates: 40°16′18″N 85°09′28″W
- Country: United States
- State: Indiana
- County: Randolph

Government
  - Type: Indiana township

Area
  - Total: 29.57 sq mi (76.6 km^{2})
  - Land: 29.42 sq mi (76.2 km^{2})
  - Water: 0.15 sq mi (0.39 km^{2})
- Elevation: 950 ft (290 m)

Population (2020)
  - Total: 1,019
  - Density: 34.64/sq mi (13.37/km^{2})
- Time zone: UTC-5 (Eastern (EST))
  - Summer (DST): UTC-4 (EDT)
- Area code: 765
- FIPS code: 18-29232
- GNIS feature ID: 453346

Green Township is one of eleven townships in Randolph County, Indiana. As of the 2020 census, its population was 1,019 (up from 957 at 2010) and it contained 413 housing units.

== History ==
Green Township was established in 1834.

== Geography ==
According to the 2010 census, the township has a total area of 29.57 square miles (76.6 km^{2}), of which 29.42 square miles (76.2 km^{2}) (or 99.49%) is land and 0.15 square miles (0.39 km^{2}) (or 0.51%) is water.

=== Unincorporated towns ===
- Fairview at 40.2980988°N 85.1952475°W
- Shedville at 40.2655989°N 85.1288577°W

(This list is based on USGS data and may include former settlements.)
