= New Lisbon, Randolph County, Indiana =

New Lisbon
- Unincorporated community
- Location within Indiana Location within the United States
- Coordinates: 40°14′37″N 84°49′28″W
- Country: United States
- State: Indiana
- County: Randolph
- Township: Jackson
- Elevation: 1,047 ft (319 m)
- Time zone: UTC-5 (Eastern (EST))
  - Summer (DST): UTC-4 (EDT)
- ZIP code: 47390
- Area code: 765
- GNIS feature ID: 440081

New Lisbon is an unincorporated community in Jackson Township, Randolph County, in the U.S. state of Indiana.

== History ==
New Lisbon was laid out in 1848, and was named after Lisbon, in Portugal.

== Cemeteries ==
The New Lisbon Cemetery is located in Jackson Township on the southwest corner of the intersection of County Roads 800 East and 550 North. There is an old and new (1893) section for this cemetery, located on both sides of County Road 800 East. Some of the stones are written in German. The old cemetery is a short distance south of the new one, and on the other (the east) side of the highway.
