= Modoc, Indiana =

- Town
- Town of Modoc
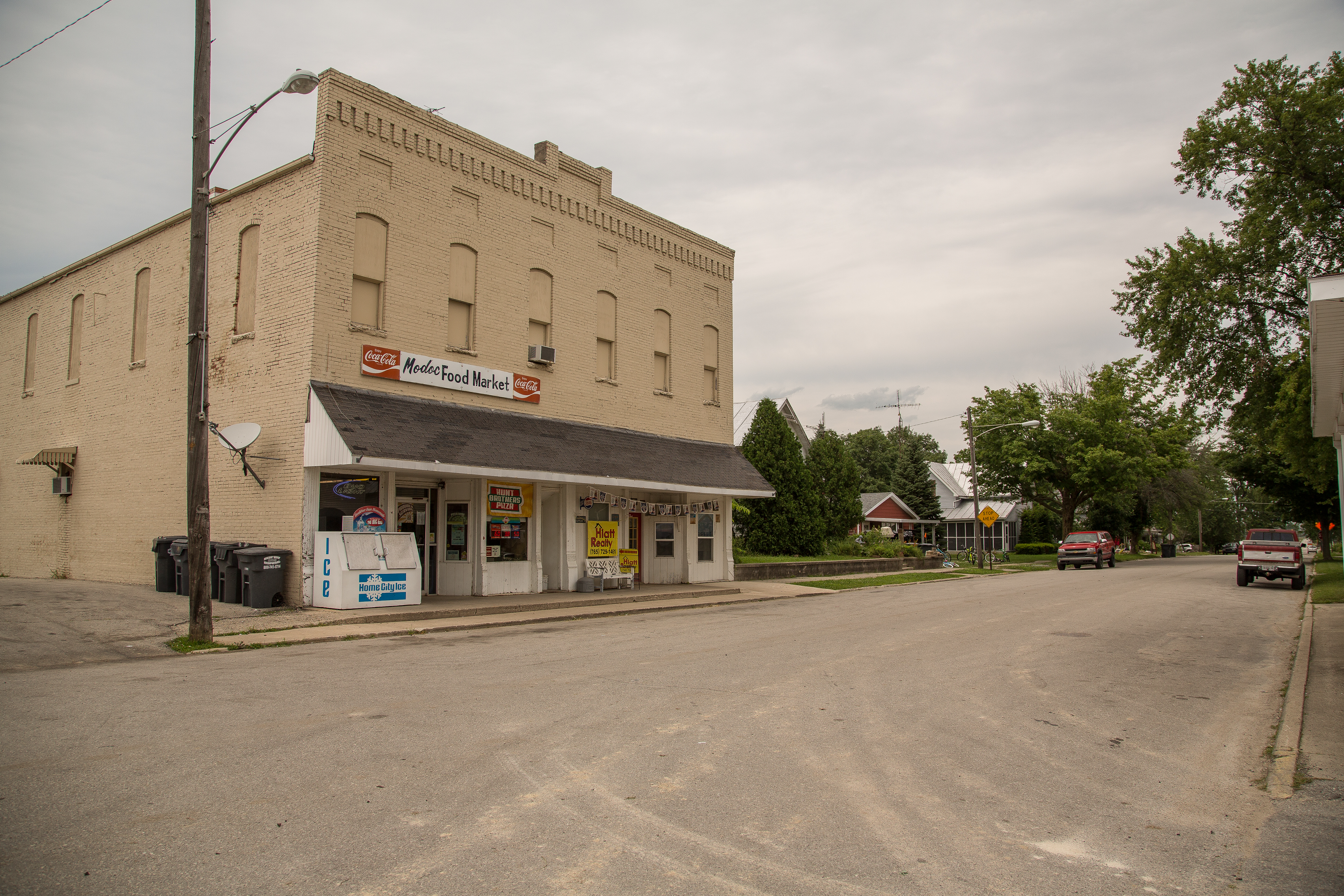
- Nickname: Small Town U.S.A
- Location of Modoc in Randolph County, Indiana.
- Coordinates: 40°02′45″N 85°07′30″W
- Country: United States
- State: Indiana
- County: Randolph
- Township: Union
- Founded: 1883

Area
  - Total: 0.10 sq mi (0.27 km^{2})
  - Land: 0.10 sq mi (0.27 km^{2})
  - Water: 0 sq mi (0.00 km^{2})
- Elevation: 1,175 ft (358 m)

Population (2020)
  - Total: 157
  - Estimate (2025): 158 ▲
  - Density: 1,519.5/sq mi (586.67/km^{2})
- Time zone: UTC-5 (EST)
  - Summer (DST): UTC-5 (EST)
- ZIP code: 47358
- Area code: 765
- Major Highways: U.S. Highway 36; Indiana State Highway 1
- FIPS code: 18-50058
- GNIS feature ID: 2396769

Modoc is a town in Union Township, Randolph County, in the U.S. state of Indiana. The population was 157 at the 2020 census.

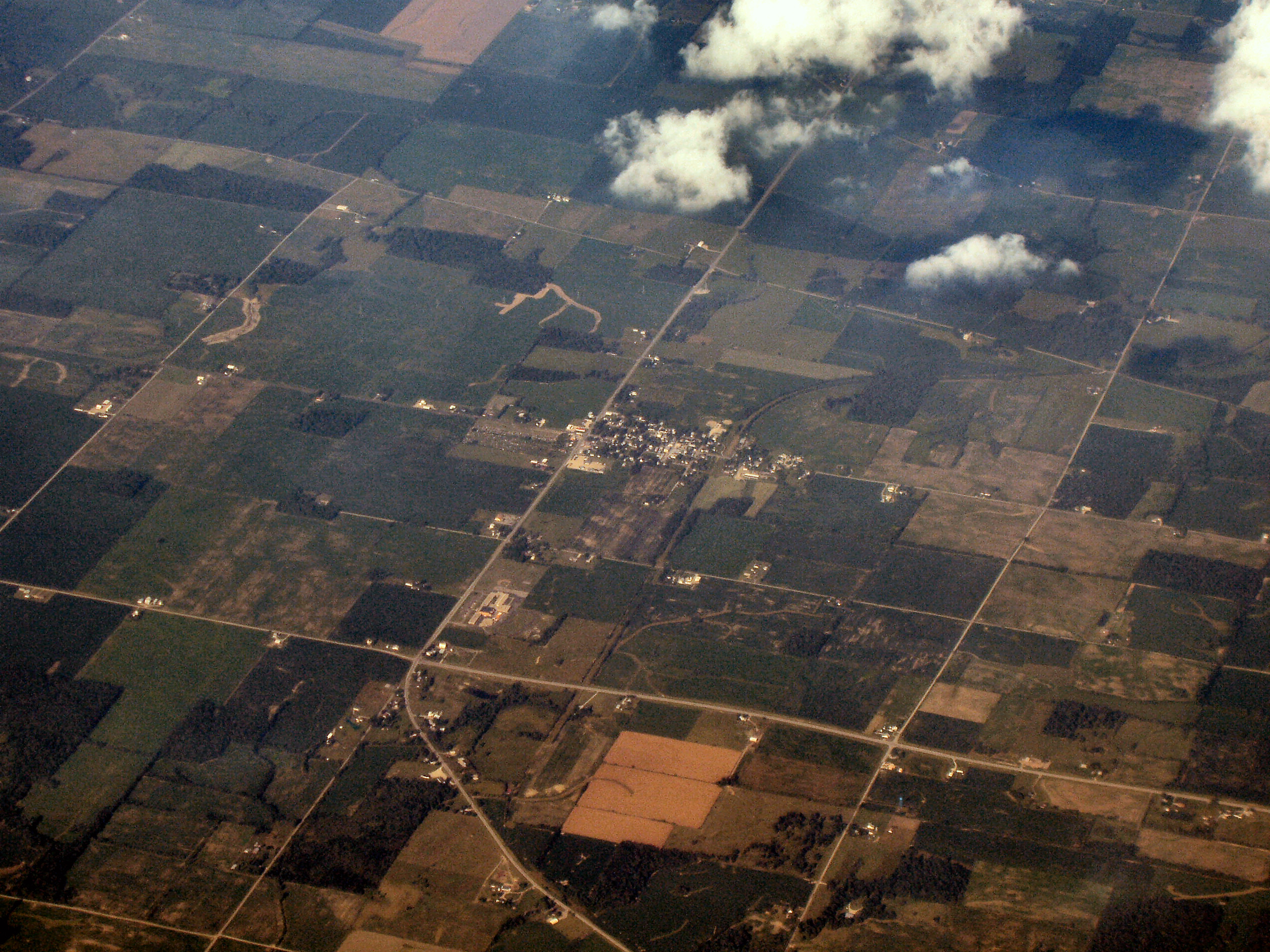
Modoc from above

== History ==
There are several legends to how the town of Modoc got its name. One of them said that a man travelling on the train threw out a cigar box containing the name Modoc, and that Henry Conley, one of the first settlers of the town, picked it up and suggested to bystanders that it would be a good name for the town. Another theory is that Modoc was named after the Modoc people who were traditionally located in northern California. They became noted for their resistance to the US Army during the Modoc War, ending in 1873.

A post office has been in operation at Modoc since 1883.

== Demographics ==
Historical population
Census	Pop.	Note	%±
1900	221		—
1910	261		18.1%
1920	256		−1.9%
1930	236		−7.8%
1940	237		0.4%
1950	275		16.0%
1960	238		−13.5%
1970	275		15.5%
1980	243		−11.6%
1990	218		−10.3%
2000	225		3.2%
2010	196		−12.9%
2020	157		−19.9%
2025 (est.)	158	▲	0.6%
U.S. Decennial Census

=== 2010 census ===
As of the census of 2010, there were 196 people, 72 households, and 50 families residing in the town. The population density was 1,960.0 inhabitants per square mile (756.8/km^{2}). There were 87 housing units at an average density of 870.0 per square mile (335.9/km^{2}). The racial makeup of the town was 94.9% White, 0.5% African American, 2.0% Pacific Islander, 0.5% from other races, and 2.0% from two or more races. Hispanic or Latino of any race were 1.5% of the population.

There were 72 households, of which 40.3% had children under the age of 18 living with them, 41.7% were married couples living together, 19.4% had a female householder with no husband present, 8.3% had a male householder with no wife present, and 30.6% were non-families. 23.6% of all households were made up of individuals, and 11.1% had someone living alone who was 65 years of age or older. The average household size was 2.72 and the average family size was 3.22.

The median age in the town was 33 years. 30.1% of residents were under the age of 18; 9.2% were between the ages of 18 and 24; 25% were from 25 to 44; 21.4% were from 45 to 64; and 14.3% were 65 years of age or older. The gender makeup of the town was 54.1% male and 45.9% female.

=== 2000 census ===
As of the census of 2000, there were 225 people, 84 households, and 63 families residing in the town. The population density was 1,908.1 inhabitants per square mile (736.7/km^{2}). There were 90 housing units at an average density of 763.2 per square mile (294.7/km^{2}). The racial makeup of the town was 96.00% White, 1.33% African American, 0.44% Pacific Islander, and 2.22% from two or more races. Hispanic or Latino of any race were 0.89% of the population.

There were 84 households, out of which 39.3% had children under the age of 18 living with them, 57.1% were married couples living together, 14.3% had a female householder with no husband present, and 25.0% were non-families. 22.6% of all households were made up of individuals, and 8.3% had someone living alone who was 65 years of age or older. The average household size was 2.68 and the average family size was 3.06.

In the town, the population was spread out, with 28.9% under the age of 18, 9.3% from 18 to 24, 31.6% from 25 to 44, 19.1% from 45 to 64, and 11.1% who were 65 years of age or older. The median age was 34 years. For every 100 females, there were 108.3 males. For every 100 females age 18 and over, there were 97.5 males.

The median income for a household in the town was $28,333, and the median income for a family was $32,708. Males had a median income of $31,250 versus $24,375 for females. The per capita income for the town was $13,230. About 12.3% of families and 14.6% of the population were below the poverty line, including 14.6% of those under the age of eighteen and 21.9% of those 65 or over.

== Geography ==
Modoc is located about 25 miles southeast of Muncie, Indiana, and is about 25 miles northwest of Richmond, Indiana and 60 miles from the cities of Indianapolis, Indiana, Dayton, Ohio, and Cincinnati.

According to the 2010 census, Modoc has a total area of 0.1 square miles (0.26 km^{2}), all land.

== Transportation ==
=== Highways ===
Major highways and roads that serve Modoc include Indiana 1 and U.S. 36.

== Randolph Farms Landfill ==
Randolph Farms Landfill is a 120-acre (486,000 m^{2}) landfill owned by the Balkema family of Kalamazoo, Michigan, located in Randolph County, Indiana. In addition to Randolph County, it serves Delaware, Madison, Jay, Wayne, and Henry Counties in Indiana, as well as Darke and Miami Counties in Ohio. Randolph Farms was built on a limestone hill, directly over sand and gravel aquifers, near the drainage basins of White River and Whitewater River.

== Education ==
It is in the Union School Corporation.

The comprehensive public secondary school of that district is Union Junior and High School. The mascot of the school is the Rocket. Their colors are royal blue and gold.

== The I. B. & W. Railroad ==
Modoc, like many other small towns, probably would not have been built if the I. B. & W. Railroad had not made its way across southern Randolph County, in 1878. The location was poorly drained, but it had the advantage of being rather flat. It was plagued, for many years, by typhoid fever outbreaks. The railroad was built by many contractors. The railroad came through Modoc from the west, and met the contractors, who were building the next section east, in what was then a strip of timber about one-half mile east of where the depot was located.
