= Brookville Lake Dam =

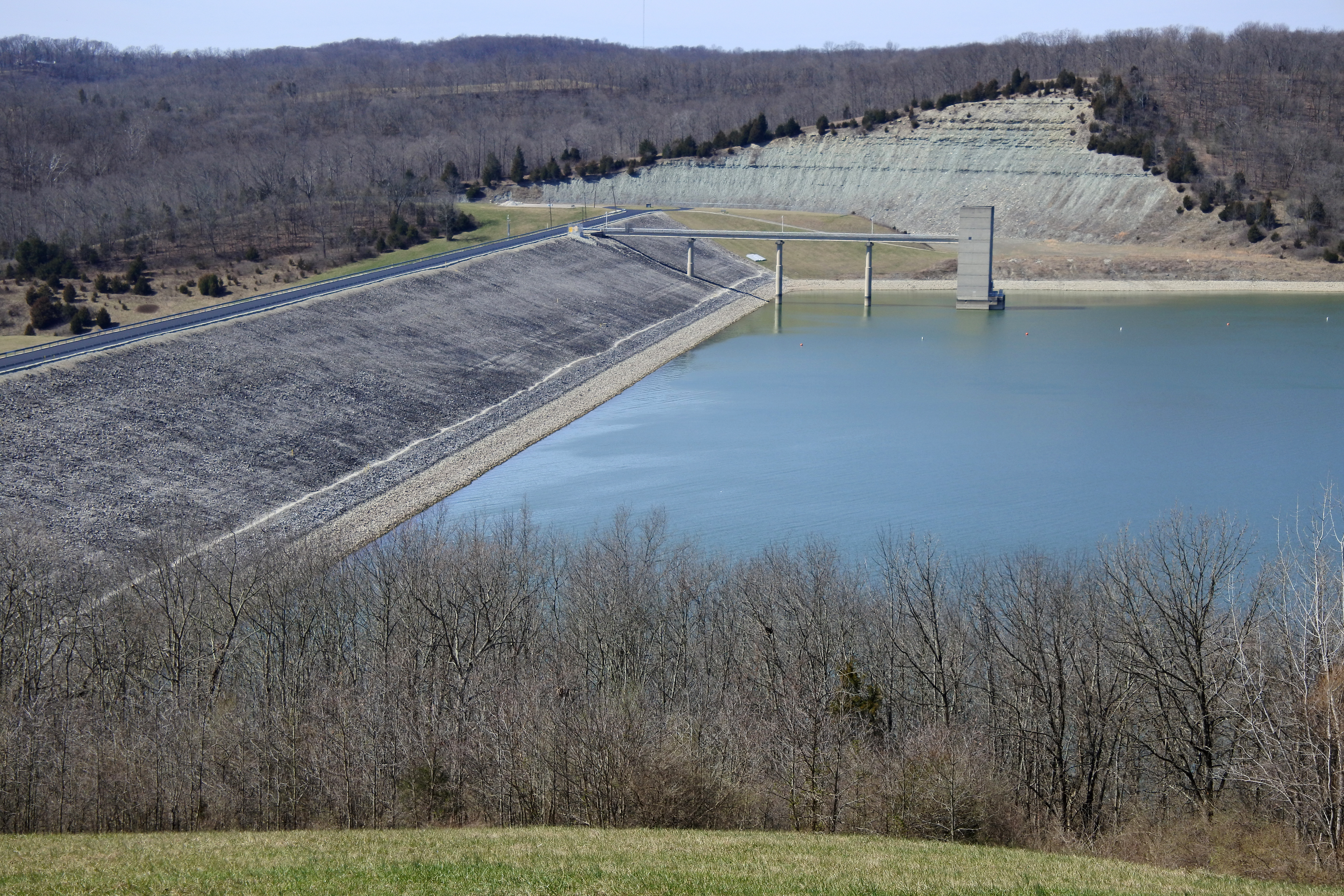
- Brookville Lake Dam, southeastern Indiana, viewed from the overlook to the east.

- Location of Brookville Lake Dam in Indiana Brookville Lake Dam (the United States)
- Country: United States
- Location: Brookville Township, Franklin County, Indiana
- Coordinates: 39°26′23″N 84°59′56″W

Dam and spillways
- Height: 181 ft (55 m)
- Length: 2,800 ft (850 m)

Reservoir
- Creates: Brookville Lake
- Total capacity: 359,600 acre⋅ft (443,600,000 m^{3})
- Active capacity: 184,900 acre⋅ft (228,100,000 m^{3})
- Surface area: 8.2 sq mi (21 km^{2})
- Normal elevation: 755 ft (230 m)

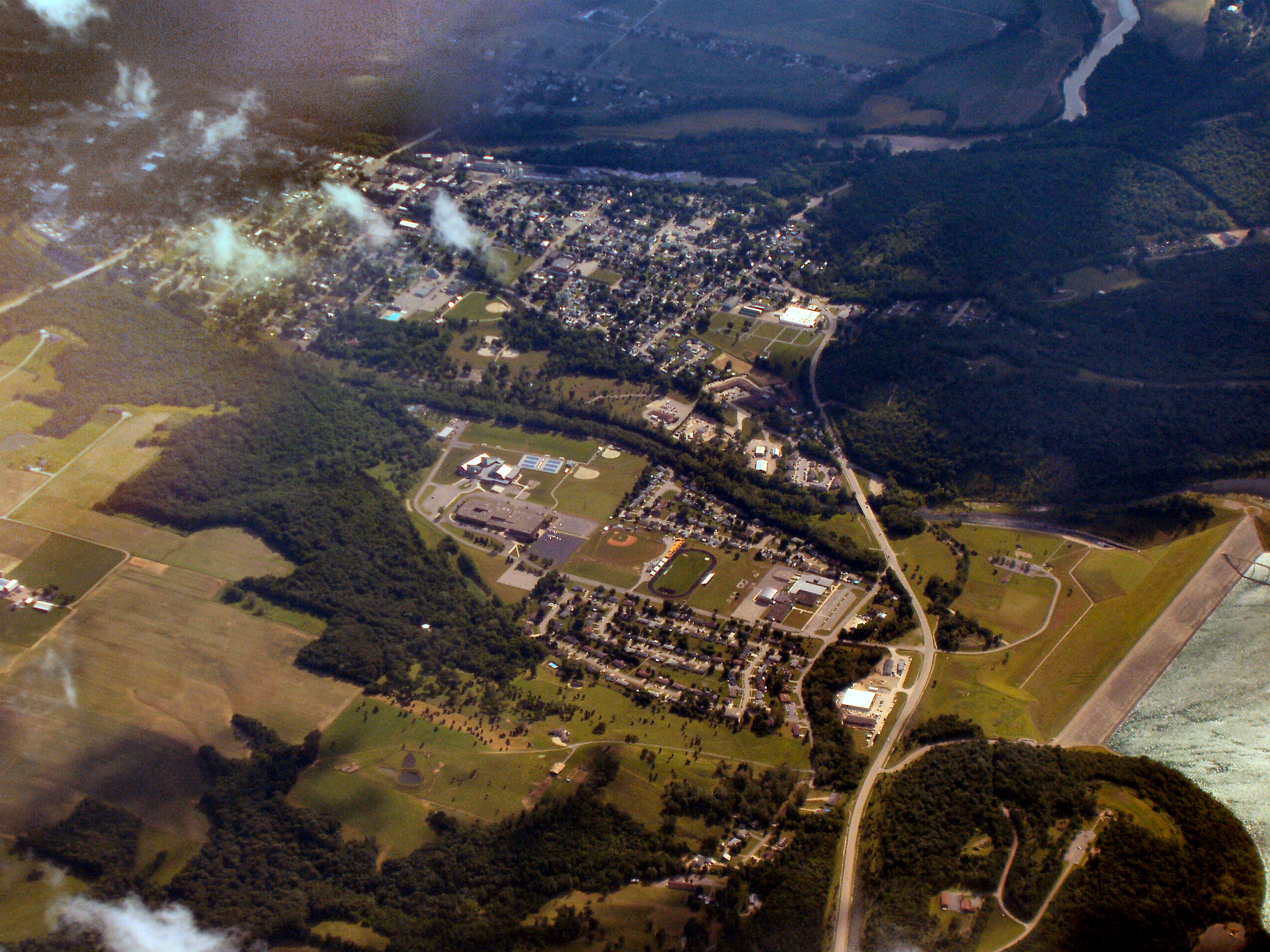
Brookville, Indiana from the northeast, with the southern end of Brookville Lake and the dam visible at right

Brookville Lake Dam (National ID # IN03017) is a dam in Brookville Township, Franklin County, Indiana, just north of Brookville, in the southeastern part of the state.

The earthen dam was constructed in 1974 by the United States Army Corps of Engineers with a height of 181 feet (55 m) and 2,800 feet (850 m) long at its crest. It impounds the East Fork of the Whitewater River for flood control and storm water management. The dam is owned and operated by the Louisville District, Great Lakes and Ohio River Division of the Corps of Engineers.

The riverine reservoir it creates, Brookville Lake, has a normal water surface of 8.2 square miles (21 km^{2}), a maximum capacity of 359,600 acre-feet (443,600,000 m^{3}), and normal storage of 184,900 acre-feet (228,100,000 m^{3}). Recreation includes boating, hiking, hunting, and fishing (for bluegill, largemouth bass, smallmouth bass, striped bass, catfish, walleye, crappie, muskellunge, trout, and white bass). Adjacent facilities include the Mounds State Recreation Area and the Whitewater Memorial State Park.
