= Georgetown, Randolph County, Indiana =

Georgetown
- Unincorporated community
- Location within Indiana Location within the United States
- Coordinates: 40°10′15″N 85°07′45″W
- Country: United States
- State: Indiana
- County: Randolph
- Township: Stoney Creek
- Elevation: 1,007 ft (307 m)
- Time zone: UTC-5 (Eastern (EST))
  - Summer (DST): UTC-4 (EDT)
- ZIP code: 47340
- Area code: 765
- GNIS feature ID: 452093

Georgetown is an unincorporated community in Stoney Creek Township, Randolph County, in the U.S. state of Indiana.

== History ==
Georgetown was laid out in 1835. The town never amounted to much and by 1882 was described as "totally extinct".
