= Monroe Township, Randolph County, Indiana =

Monroe Township
- Township
- Coordinates: 40°12′44″N 85°09′20″W
- Country: United States
- State: Indiana
- County: Randolph

Government
  - Type: Indiana township

Area
  - Total: 29.14 sq mi (75.5 km^{2})
  - Land: 29.14 sq mi (75.5 km^{2})
  - Water: 0.01 sq mi (0.026 km^{2})
- Elevation: 1,010 ft (308 m)

Population (2020)
  - Total: 3,459
  - Density: 118.7/sq mi (45.83/km^{2})
- Time zone: UTC-5 (Eastern (EST))
  - Summer (DST): UTC-4 (EDT)
- Area code: 765
- FIPS code: 18-50472
- GNIS feature ID: 453647

Monroe Township is one of eleven townships in Randolph County, Indiana. As of the 2020 census, its population was 3,459 (down from 3,711 at 2010) and it contained 1,577 housing units.

Monroe Township was established before 1851.

== Geography ==
According to the 2010 census, the township has a total area of 29.14 square miles (75.5 km^{2}), of which 29.14 square miles (75.5 km^{2}) (or 100%) is land and 0.01 square miles (0.026 km^{2}) (or 0.03%) is water.

=== Cities and towns ===
- Farmland
- Parker City
