= Buena Vista, Randolph County, Indiana =

Buena Vista
- Unincorporated community
- Location within Indiana Location within the United States
- Coordinates: 40°07′14″N 85°04′23″W
- Country: United States
- State: Indiana
- County: Randolph
- Township: White River
- Elevation: 1,122 ft (342 m)
- Time zone: UTC-5 (Eastern (EST))
  - Summer (DST): UTC-4 (EDT)
- ZIP code: 47394
- Area code: 765
- GNIS feature ID: 431765

Buena Vista is an unincorporated community in White River Township, Randolph County, in the U.S. state of Indiana.

== History ==
An old variant name of the community was Cerro Gordo.
