= Washington Township, Randolph County, Indiana =

Washington Township
- Township
- Coordinates: 40°03′33″N 84°59′02″W
- Country: United States
- State: Indiana
- County: Randolph

Government
  - Type: Indiana township

Area
  - Total: 44.43 sq mi (115.1 km^{2})
  - Land: 44.36 sq mi (114.9 km^{2})
  - Water: 0.07 sq mi (0.18 km^{2})
- Elevation: 1,158 ft (353 m)

Population (2020)
  - Total: 1,906
  - Density: 42.97/sq mi (16.59/km^{2})
- Time zone: UTC-5 (Eastern (EST))
  - Summer (DST): UTC-4 (EDT)
- Area code: 765
- FIPS code: 18-80990
- GNIS feature ID: 454016

Washington Township is one of eleven townships in Randolph County, Indiana. As of the 2020 census, its population was 1,906 (down from 2,172 at 2010) and it contained 896 housing units.

== History ==
Washington Township was established in 1831.

== Geography ==
According to the 2010 census, the township has a total area of 44.43 square miles (115.1 km^{2}), of which 44.36 square miles (114.9 km^{2}) (or 99.84%) is land and 0.07 square miles (0.18 km^{2}) (or 0.16%) is water.

=== Cities and towns ===
- Lynn

=== Unincorporated towns ===
- Bloomingport at 40.0269904°N 84.9946863°W
- Carlos at 40.0264350°N 85.0344088°W
- Rural at 40.1067123°N 84.9660757°W
- Snow Hill at 40.0919902°N 84.9630200°W

(This list is based on USGS data and may include former settlements.)
