= Fairview, Randolph County, Indiana =

Fairview
- Unincorporated community and Census-designated place
- Location within Indiana Location within the United States
- Coordinates: 40°17′51″N 85°11′46″W
- Country: United States
- State: Indiana
- County: Randolph
- Township: Green
- Elevation: 965 ft (294 m)
- Time zone: UTC-5 (Eastern (EST))
  - Summer (DST): UTC-4 (EDT)
- ZIP code: 47373
- Area code: 765
- GNIS feature ID: 2830508

Fairview is an unincorporated community in Green Township, Randolph County, in the U.S. state of Indiana.

== History ==
Fairview was platted in 1838. A post office was established at Fairview in 1843, and remained in operation until it was discontinued in 1901.

== Demographics ==
The United States Census Bureau first delineated Fairview as a census designated place in the 2022 American Community Survey.
