= Jackson Township, Randolph County, Indiana =

Jackson Township
- Township
- Coordinates: 40°15′51″N 84°51′19″W
- Country: United States
- State: Indiana
- County: Randolph

Government
  - Type: Indiana township

Area
  - Total: 30.41 sq mi (78.8 km^{2})
  - Land: 30.36 sq mi (78.6 km^{2})
  - Water: 0.06 sq mi (0.16 km^{2})
- Elevation: 1,030 ft (314 m)

Population (2020)
  - Total: 558
  - Density: 18.4/sq mi (7.10/km^{2})
- Time zone: UTC-5 (Eastern (EST))
  - Summer (DST): UTC-4 (EDT)
- Area code: 765
- FIPS code: 18-37350
- GNIS feature ID: 453463

Jackson Township is one of eleven townships in Randolph County, Indiana, United States. As of the 2020 census, its population was 558 (down from 619 at 2010) and it contained 246 housing units.

== History ==
Jackson Township was established in 1833.

== Geography ==
According to the 2010 census, the township has a total area of 30.41 square miles (78.8 km^{2}), of which 30.36 square miles (78.6 km^{2}) (or 99.84%) is land and 0.06 square miles (0.16 km^{2}) (or 0.20%) is water.

=== Unincorporated towns ===
- New Lisbon at 40.2436572°N 84.8244072°W
- New Pittsburg at 40.3075453°N 84.8991318°W

(This list is based on USGS data and may include former settlements.)
