= Snow Hill, Randolph County, Indiana =

Snow Hill
- Unincorporated community
- Location within Indiana Location within the United States
- Coordinates: 40°05′31″N 84°57′47″W
- Country: United States
- State: Indiana
- County: Randolph
- Township: Washington
- Elevation: 1,191 ft (363 m)
- Time zone: UTC-5 (Eastern (EST))
  - Summer (DST): UTC-4 (EDT)
- ZIP code: 47394
- Area code: 765
- GNIS feature ID: 449733

Snow Hill is an unincorporated community in Washington Township, Randolph County, in the U.S. state of Indiana.

== History ==
Snow Hill was first settled about 1838. An old variant name of the community was called Mount Pleasant.

=== Post office ===
A post office was established at Snow Hill in 1856, and remained in operation until it was discontinued in 1907.
