= Wayne Township, Randolph County, Indiana =

Wayne Township
- Township
- Coordinates: 40°09′52″N 84°51′22″W
- Country: United States
- State: Indiana
- County: Randolph

Government
  - Type: Indiana township

Area
  - Total: 39.74 sq mi (102.9 km^{2})
  - Land: 39.7 sq mi (103 km^{2})
  - Water: 0.04 sq mi (0.10 km^{2})
- Elevation: 1,112 ft (339 m)

Population (2020)
  - Total: 4,317
  - Density: 109/sq mi (42.0/km^{2})
- Time zone: UTC-5 (Eastern (EST))
  - Summer (DST): UTC-4 (EDT)
- Area code: 765
- FIPS code: 18-81890
- GNIS feature ID: 454039

Wayne Township is one of eleven townships in Randolph County, Indiana. As of the 2020 census, its population was 4,317 (down from 4,611 at 2010) and it contained 2,109 housing units.

== History ==
Wayne Township was established in 1838.

== Geography ==
According to the 2010 census, the township has a total area of 39.74 square miles (102.9 km^{2}), of which 39.7 square miles (103 km^{2}) (or 99.90%) is land and 0.04 square miles (0.10 km^{2}) (or 0.10%) is water.

=== Cities and towns ===
- Union City

=== Unincorporated towns ===
- Bartonia at 40.1153245°N 84.8510732°W
- Harrisville at 40.1847681°N 84.8816304°W
- South Salem at 40.1511577°N 84.8410734°W

(This list is based on USGS data and may include former settlements.)
