= Pinch, Indiana =

- Unincorporated community
- Location within Indiana Location within the United States
- Coordinates: 40°06′24″N 85°08′47″W
- Country: United States
- State: Indiana
- County: Randolph
- Township: Stoney Creek
- Elevation: 1,102 ft (336 m)
- Time zone: UTC-5 (Eastern (EST))
  - Summer (DST): UTC-4 (EDT)
- ZIP code: 47340
- Area code: 765
- GNIS feature ID: 441146

Pinch is an unincorporated community in Stoney Creek Township, Randolph County, in the U.S. state of Indiana.

== History ==
According to tradition, Pinch was so named because money was scarce in that community.
