= Union Junior and High School =

Location
- 8707 West US 36; Modoc, Indiana 47358; United States; 40°02′49″N 85°08′29″W

Information
- Type: Public high school
- Motto: We Are Small but Mighty
- Established: 1952
- Locale: Small Town Rural
- Teaching staff: 39.90 (FTE)
- Grades: 7-12
- Enrollment: 131 (2024-2025)
- Student to teacher ratio: 3.28
- Color
- Athletics: Mid-Eastern Conference
- Nickname: Rockets
- Website: www.usc.k12.in.us/jrsrhighschool_home.aspx

Union Junior and High School is a small junior and senior high school located in Union Township, Modoc, Indiana. It is a part of the Union School Corporation.

It is one of five high schools in Randolph County, Indiana. In 2004 Union High School was named an Indiana Four Star School by the Indiana Department of Education. The school is a member of the Indiana High School Athletic Association (IHSAA), which is the governing body for high school sports in the state of Indiana.

== History ==
Union High School (Modoc) was formed in 1952 after the closing of three small high schools: Modoc High School, Losantville High School, and Huntsville High School. For the first five years, students attended the old Modoc High School. At the time, the school was oversubscribed. When the school formed, it was the largest high school in the county.

In 1957, the new building was finished, and all students were relocated to the new building. In 1968 an addition was completed allowing Blountsville School, which housed grades 1–8, to be closed and consolidated with Union.

== See also ==
- List of high schools in Indiana
