= Bloomingport, Indiana =

- Unincorporated community
- Location within Indiana Location within the United States
- Coordinates: 40°01′37″N 84°59′41″W
- Country: United States
- State: Indiana
- County: Randolph
- Township: Washington
- Elevation: 1,191 ft (363 m)
- Time zone: UTC-5 (Eastern (EST))
  - Summer (DST): UTC-4 (EDT)
- ZIP code: 47355
- Area code: 765
- GNIS feature ID: 431205

Bloomingport is an unincorporated community in Washington Township, Randolph County, in the U.S. state of Indiana.

== History ==
Bloomingport was laid out as Bloomingsport in about 1828. A post office called Bloomingport was established in 1851, and remained in operation until 1905.
