= Randolph County, Indiana =

County in Indiana, United States

- County
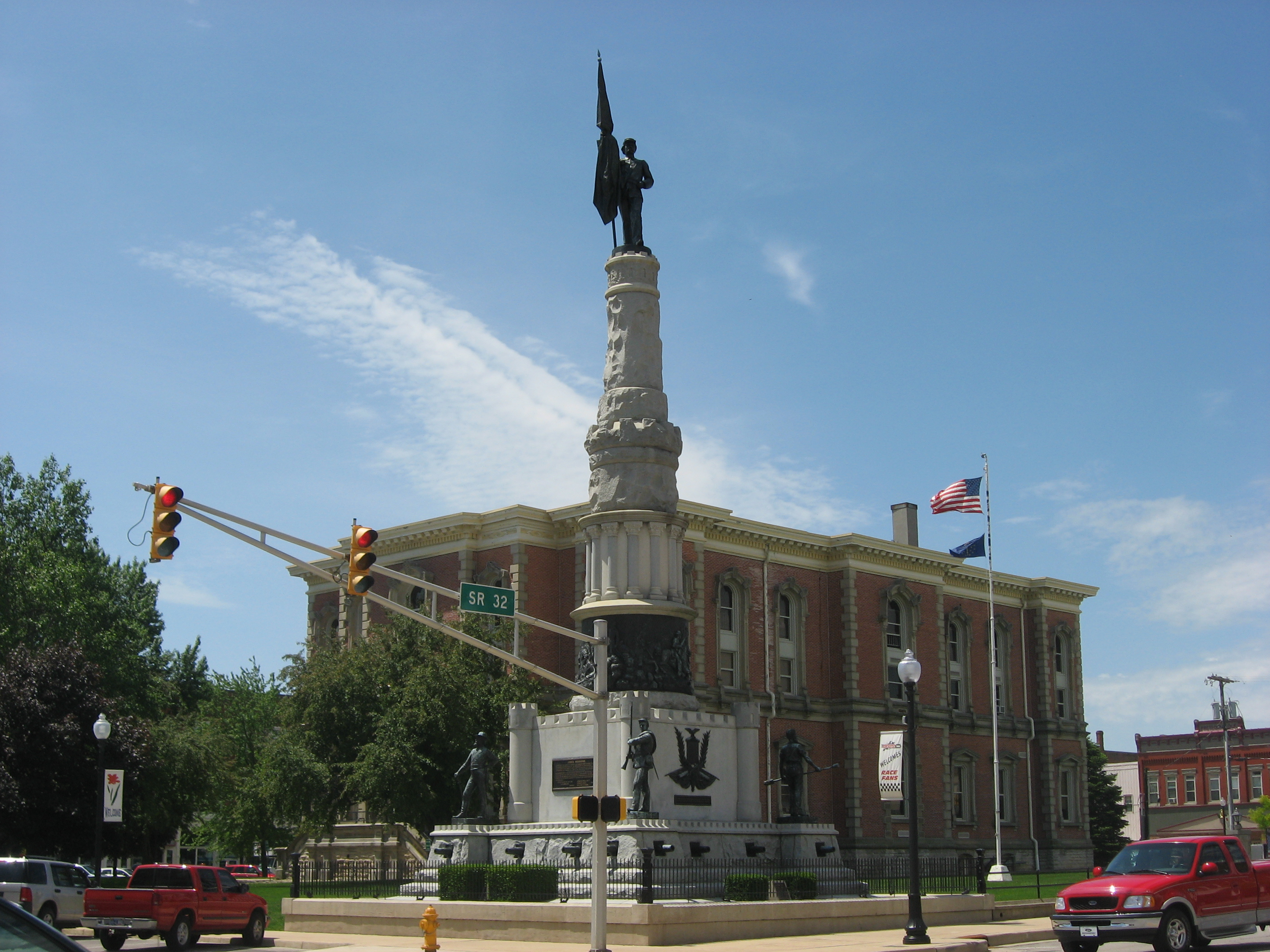
- Randolph County Courthouse

- Seal

- Location within the U.S. state of Indiana
- Coordinates: 40°09′N 85°01′W
- Country: United States
- State: Indiana
- Founded: 1818
- Named for: Peyton Randolph
- Seat: Winchester
- Largest city: Winchester

Area
  - Total: 453.31 sq mi (1,174.1 km^{2})
  - Land: 452.38 sq mi (1,171.7 km^{2})
  - Water: 0.94 sq mi (2.4 km^{2}) 0.21%

Population (2020)
  - Total: 24,502
  - Estimate (2025): 24,438 ▼
  - Density: 54.162/sq mi (20.912/km^{2})
- Time zone: UTC−5 (Eastern)
  - Summer (DST): UTC−4 (EDT)
- Congressional districts: 3rd, 6th
- Website: www.in.gov/counties/randolph/
- Indiana county number 68

Randolph County is a county located in the central section of U.S. state of Indiana, on its eastern border with Ohio. As of 2020, the population was 24,502. The county seat is Winchester.

== History ==
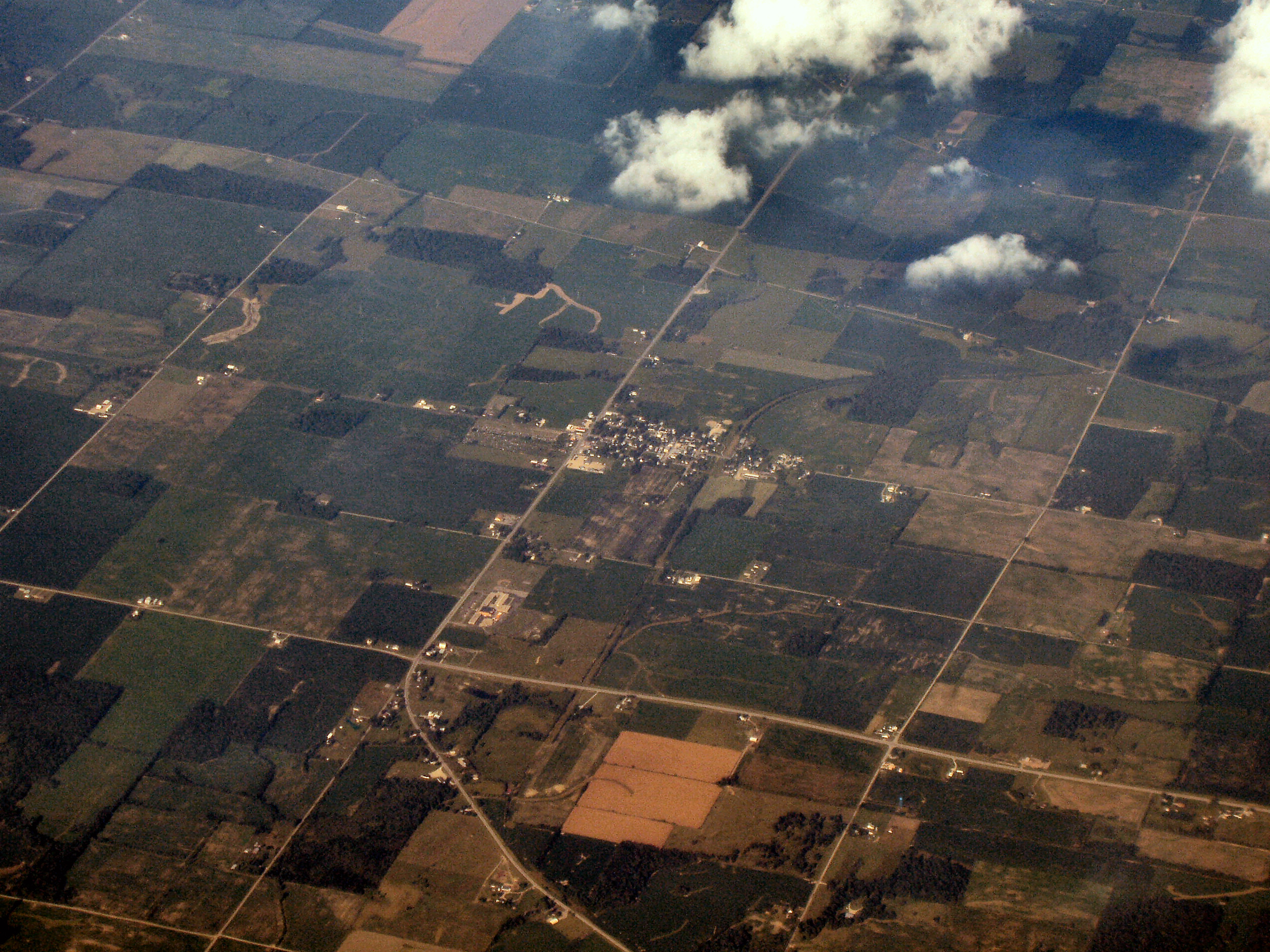
Modoc from the air, looking northeast.

The Indiana General Assembly authorized the formation of Randolph County from Wayne County in January 1818, to take effect in August 1818. According to "The History of Randolph County in 1882" by Ebenezer Tucker, The county was named for Randolph County, Indiana Territory, which later became Randolph County, Illinois, which was named in honor of Edmund Randolph, governor of Virginia. The county may also have been named for Randolph County, North Carolina, where the area's first settlers came from. That county was named for Peyton Randolph, the first President of the Continental Congress under the Articles of Confederation.

Between 1820 and 1824, the county's territory extended to the Michigan boundary; consequently, the plat for the town of Fort Wayne (now a city) is recorded in Randolph County's Recorder's Office. Randolph County's population grew rapidly in the early years of the nineteenth century. It became known as a progressive community, with many residents coming from the mid-Atlantic and northern tier free states. Numerous members of the Society of Friends (Quakers) lived here, and they supported public education and abolitionism.

The county was the site of three settlements developed by free African Americans, and by 1845 there were about 500 people of color here. The most famous, the Greenville Settlement, in Greensfork Township, was in the southeast part of the county and straddled the state line, also partially in Darke County, Ohio. It was the site of the Union Literary Institute, founded in 1846 by Quakers and free people of color. It was primarily for black students of the area, but also accepted whites as one of the first racially integrated schools in the United States. Other predominately black settlements were Cabin Creek, about 10 miles southwest of Winchester, Indiana; and Snow Hill, between Winchester and Lynn, Indiana.

Given its settlement history, with many migrants from the northern tier, Randolph County was politically dominated by the Republican Party into the early twentieth century. Between 1858 and 1931, the county produced two Governors, one Congressman, one U. S. Senator, three Indiana Secretaries of State, and one State Superintendent of Public Instruction. The county's population growth slowed after 1880.

Randolph County answered the problem of rural decline in the early twentieth century by embracing much of the Country Life Movement. The county consolidated its rural schools. This was done under the leadership of Lee L. Driver, a county native who became the nation's leading expert on rural school consolidation. Randolph County became the exemplar of the movement, and was the subject of many publications and visits from officials from as far away as Canada and China.

In the early 21st century, residents in Winchester, Union City, and Farmland have sought to revitalize Randolph County through a renewed focus on historic preservation, heritage tourism, and the arts. The county is included in the Ohio River National Freedom Corridor, as many refugees from slavery sought escape via crossing the Ohio River and using aid of residents at stops along the Underground Railroad, sometimes traveling further north and into Canada. In 2016 a state historical marker was installed at the site of the Union Literary Institute, to recognize its contributions to black and interracial education, and the cause of freedom.

== Geography ==
According to the 2010 census, the county has a total area of 453.31 square miles (1,174.1 km^{2}), of which 452.38 square miles (1,171.7 km^{2}) (or 99.79%) is land and 0.94 square miles (2.4 km^{2}) (or 0.21%) is water.

Randolph County is the point of origin for the White River and Whitewater River.

=== Adjacent counties ===
- Jay County (north)
- Darke County, Ohio (east)
- Wayne County (south)
- Henry County (southwest)
- Delaware County (west)

=== Transportation ===
- U.S. Route 36
- U.S. Route 35
- U.S. Route 27
- Indiana State Road 1
- Indiana State Road 28
- Indiana State Road 32
- Indiana State Road 227

=== Cities and towns ===
==== Incorporated ====
- Farmland
- Losantville
- Lynn
- Modoc
- Parker City
- Ridgeville
- Saratoga
- Union City
- Winchester

==== Unincorporated ====
- Arba
- Bartonia
- Bloomingport
- Buena Vista
- Carlos
- Crete
- Deerfield
- Fairview
- Georgetown
- Harrisville
- Huntsville
- Maxville
- New Lisbon
- New Pittsburg
- Pinch
- Randolph
- Rural
- Scott Corner
- Shedville
- Snow Hill
- South Salem
- Spartanburg
- Stone
- Unionport
- Windsor

Map of Randolph County, Indiana With Municipal and Township Labels

=== Townships ===
- Franklin
- Green
- Greensfork
- Jackson
- Monroe
- Stoney Creek
- Union
- Ward
- Washington
- Wayne
- White River

Nettle Creek (Losantville) and West River (Modoc) Townships were combined to form Union Township.

== Attractions ==
McVey Memorial Forest (Located North of Farmland approximately 6 miles on State Road 1)

Farmers market during the summer on the Courthouse Square in Winchester.

== Local festivals and events ==
- Mom, Baseball and Apple Pie Festival. (Held in Winchester during August annually.)
- Labor Day marathon softball tournament (Winchester City Park and draws teams from all over the United States to play softball and celebrate the last holiday of summer. Winchester's population nearly doubles for this weekend.)
- Mardi Gras. (Held annually in October in Winchester.)
- State Line Heritage Days. (Held annually in the fall in Union City.)
- A Community Christmas, drive-through lightshow at Harter Park in Union City. (Held annually between Thanksgiving and New Year's.)

=== Airports ===
- Randolph County Airport (newly expanded in 2010 and 2011)

== Climate and weather ==
Winchester, Indiana

Climate chart (precipitation, max. and min. temperature)
| J | F | M | A | M | J | J | A | S | O | N | D |
| 1.9 32 16 | 1.6 36 19 | 2.9 47 29 | 3.6 60 40 | 4.1 70 51 | 4.3 80 60 | 4.3 83 63 | 3.6 81 61 | 2.8 75 54 | 2.6 63 42 | 3.2 49 33 | 2.8 37 22 |
- █ Average max. and min. temperatures in °F
- █ Precipitation totals in inches
- Source: The Weather Channel
Metric conversion
| J | F | M | A | M | J | J | A | S | O | N | D |
| 49 0 −9 | 41 2 −7 | 74 8 −2 | 92 16 4 | 105 21 11 | 110 27 16 | 109 28 17 | 92 27 16 | 71 24 12 | 66 17 6 | 81 9 1 | 70 3 −6 |
- █ Average max. and min. temperatures in °C
- █ Precipitation totals in mm

In recent years, average temperatures in Winchester have ranged from a low of 16 °F (−9 °C) in January to a high of 83 °F (28 °C) in July, although a record low of −26 °F (−32 °C) was recorded in January 1994 and a record high of 102 °F (39 °C) was recorded in September 1953. Average monthly precipitation ranged from 1.63 inches (41 mm) in February to 4.34 inches (110 mm) in June.

== Government ==
The county government is a constitutional body, and is granted specific powers by the Constitution of Indiana, and by the Indiana Code.

County Council: The county council is the legislative branch of the county government and controls all the spending and revenue collection in the county. Representatives are elected from county districts. The council members serve four-year terms. They are responsible for setting salaries, the annual budget, and special spending. The council also has limited authority to impose local taxes, in the form of an income and property tax that is subject to state level approval, excise taxes, and service taxes.

Board of Commissioners: The executive body of the county is made of a board of commissioners. The commissioners are elected county-wide, in staggered terms, and each serves a four-year term. One of the commissioners, typically the most senior, serves as president. The commissioners are charged with executing the acts legislated by the council, collecting revenue, and managing the day-to-day functions of the county government.

Court: The county maintains a small claims court that can handle some civil cases. The judge on the court is elected to a term of four years and must be a member of the Indiana Bar Association. The judge is assisted by a constable who is also elected to a four-year term. In some cases, court decisions can be appealed to the state level circuit court.

County Officials: The county has several other elected offices, including sheriff, coroner, auditor, treasurer, recorder, surveyor, and circuit court clerk Each of these elected officers serves a term of four years and oversees a different part of county government. Members elected to county government positions are required to declare party affiliations and to be residents of the county.

Randolph County is part of Indiana's 6th congressional district and is represented in Congress by Republican Greg Pence.

Randolph County is one of the most consistently Republican counties in the entire United States. Since 1888, the Republican candidate has only failed to carry the county in a presidential election twice. This occurred in 1912 thanks to the strong third party candidacy of Theodore Roosevelt, as well as 1964 where Barry Goldwater was seen as too conservative statewide & nationally in his landslide loss to Lyndon B. Johnson.

United States presidential election results for Randolph County, Indiana
| Year | Republican | | Democratic | | Third party(ies) | |
| Year | No. | % | No. | % | No. | % |
|---|---|---|---|---|---|---|
| 1888 | 4,629 | 65.11% | 2,256 | 31.73% | 225 | 3.16% |
| 1892 | 4,058 | 60.37% | 1,994 | 29.66% | 670 | 9.97% |
| 1896 | 4,674 | 62.77% | 2,677 | 35.95% | 95 | 1.28% |
| 1900 | 5,050 | 65.57% | 2,393 | 31.07% | 259 | 3.36% |
| 1904 | 5,139 | 67.49% | 1,924 | 25.27% | 552 | 7.25% |
| 1908 | 4,792 | 60.90% | 2,600 | 33.05% | 476 | 6.05% |
| 1912 | 1,988 | 27.33% | 2,158 | 29.66% | 3,129 | 43.01% |
| 1916 | 4,054 | 54.31% | 2,682 | 35.93% | 728 | 9.75% |
| 1920 | 8,773 | 65.28% | 4,198 | 31.24% | 468 | 3.48% |
| 1924 | 7,397 | 64.10% | 3,768 | 32.65% | 374 | 3.24% |
| 1928 | 8,368 | 71.32% | 3,264 | 27.82% | 101 | 0.86% |
| 1932 | 6,509 | 49.44% | 6,223 | 47.27% | 434 | 3.30% |
| 1936 | 6,682 | 50.30% | 6,487 | 48.84% | 114 | 0.86% |
| 1940 | 8,033 | 57.19% | 5,787 | 41.20% | 226 | 1.61% |
| 1944 | 7,805 | 61.18% | 4,590 | 35.98% | 363 | 2.85% |
| 1948 | 7,122 | 57.96% | 4,655 | 37.89% | 510 | 4.15% |
| 1952 | 9,150 | 65.42% | 4,461 | 31.90% | 375 | 2.68% |
| 1956 | 9,020 | 65.02% | 4,701 | 33.89% | 152 | 1.10% |
| 1960 | 9,528 | 64.92% | 5,035 | 34.31% | 114 | 0.78% |
| 1964 | 6,551 | 48.50% | 6,804 | 50.38% | 151 | 1.12% |
| 1968 | 7,238 | 57.14% | 3,962 | 31.28% | 1,467 | 11.58% |
| 1972 | 8,754 | 71.57% | 3,409 | 27.87% | 69 | 0.56% |
| 1976 | 6,891 | 55.93% | 5,330 | 43.26% | 99 | 0.80% |
| 1980 | 7,762 | 62.65% | 4,025 | 32.49% | 603 | 4.87% |
| 1984 | 7,793 | 66.77% | 3,805 | 32.60% | 73 | 0.63% |
| 1988 | 6,856 | 62.85% | 3,990 | 36.58% | 62 | 0.57% |
| 1992 | 4,937 | 41.90% | 3,870 | 32.84% | 2,977 | 25.26% |
| 1996 | 4,708 | 45.18% | 4,087 | 39.22% | 1,625 | 15.60% |
| 2000 | 6,020 | 59.42% | 3,906 | 38.55% | 206 | 2.03% |
| 2004 | 7,172 | 64.66% | 3,812 | 34.37% | 108 | 0.97% |
| 2008 | 5,788 | 53.48% | 4,839 | 44.71% | 195 | 1.80% |
| 2012 | 6,218 | 60.95% | 3,769 | 36.94% | 215 | 2.11% |
| 2016 | 7,517 | 71.43% | 2,446 | 23.24% | 560 | 5.32% |
| 2020 | 8,312 | 75.02% | 2,513 | 22.68% | 254 | 2.29% |
| 2024 | 8,008 | 75.80% | 2,349 | 22.23% | 208 | 1.97% |

== Education ==
Five school districts have territory in Randolph County:

- Randolph Central School Corporation
- Randolph Eastern School Corporation
- Randolph Southern School Corporation
- Monroe Central School Corporation
- Union School Corporation

=== High schools ===
- Union Junior and High School
- Randolph Southern High School
- Union City Community High School (Randolph Eastern)
- Winchester Community High School (Randolph Central)
- Monroe Central Junior-Senior High School

=== Junior high/middle schools ===
- Union Jr. High School
- Randolph Southern Junior-Senior High School
- West Side Middle School (Randolph Eastern)
- Lee L. Driver Middle School (Randolph Central)
- Monroe Central Junior-Senior High School

=== Elementary schools ===
- Union Elementary School
- Randolph Southern Elementary School
- North Side Elementary School (Randolph Eastern)
- Deerfield Elementary School (Randolph Central)
- O.R. Baker Elementary School (Randolph Central)
- Willard Elementary School (Randolph Central)
- Monroe Central Elementary School

== Notable residents ==
- Congressman Thomas M. Browne.
- John R. Commons, nationally known economist.
- Governor James P. Goodrich.
- Governor Isaac P. Gray.
- Wendell M. Stanley, Nobel Prize Winner in Chemistry.
- Senator James E. Watson.
- Robert Wise (1914–2005), Hollywood director, was born in Winchester.
- Jim Jones (1931–1978), 1970s leader of the Peoples Temple and founder of Jonestown.
- Rick Derringer of the group, The McCoys, who had the hit song, "Hang On Sloopy". He also did "Rock N Roll Hoochie Koo" and toured with the Ringo Starr, All-Star Band.
- Randy Hobbs, also of the McCoys, one of the great bass guitarists in music history. He also played with Jimi Hendrix, and the Johnny and Edgar Winters Bands.

== Demographics ==
Historical population
| Census | Pop. | Note | %± |
|---|---|---|---|
| 1820 | 1,808 | | — |
| 1830 | 3,912 | | 116.4% |
| 1840 | 10,684 | | 173.1% |
| 1850 | 14,725 | | 37.8% |
| 1860 | 18,997 | | 29.0% |
| 1870 | 22,862 | | 20.3% |
| 1880 | 26,435 | | 15.6% |
| 1890 | 28,085 | | 6.2% |
| 1900 | 28,653 | | 2.0% |
| 1910 | 29,013 | | 1.3% |
| 1920 | 26,484 | | −8.7% |
| 1930 | 24,859 | | −6.1% |
| 1940 | 26,766 | | 7.7% |
| 1950 | 27,141 | | 1.4% |
| 1960 | 28,434 | | 4.8% |
| 1970 | 28,915 | | 1.7% |
| 1980 | 29,997 | | 3.7% |
| 1990 | 27,148 | | −9.5% |
| 2000 | 27,401 | | 0.9% |
| 2010 | 26,171 | | −4.5% |
| 2020 | 24,502 | | −6.4% |
| 2025 (est.) | 24,438 | ▼ | −0.3% |
U.S. Decennial Census; 1790-1960 1900-1990; 1990-2000 2010

=== Racial and ethnic composition ===
Randolph County, Indiana – Racial and ethnic composition Note: the US Census treats Hispanic/Latino as an ethnic category. This table excludes Latinos from the racial categories and assigns them to a separate category. Hispanics/Latinos may be of any race.
| Race / Ethnicity (NH = Non-Hispanic) | Pop 1980 | Pop 1990 | Pop 2000 | Pop 2010 | Pop 2020 | % 1980 | % 1990 | % 2000 | % 2010 | % 2020 |
|---|---|---|---|---|---|---|---|---|---|---|
| White alone (NH) | 29,632 | 26,811 | 26,716 | 24,895 | 22,325 | 98.78% | 98.76% | 97.50% | 95.12% | 91.12% |
| Black or African American alone (NH) | 69 | 56 | 64 | 114 | 119 | 0.23% | 0.21% | 0.23% | 0.44% | 0.49% |
| Native American or Alaska Native alone (NH) | 35 | 47 | 50 | 83 | 52 | 0.12% | 0.17% | 0.18% | 0.32% | 0.21% |
| Asian alone (NH) | 46 | 37 | 41 | 57 | 67 | 0.15% | 0.14% | 0.15% | 0.22% | 0.27% |
| Native Hawaiian or Pacific Islander alone (NH) | x | x | 8 | 8 | 0 | x | x | 0.03% | 0.03% | 0.00% |
| Other race alone (NH) | 7 | 5 | 8 | 9 | 60 | 0.02% | 0.02% | 0.03% | 0.03% | 0.24% |
| Mixed race or Multiracial (NH) | x | x | 181 | 215 | 723 | x | x | 0.66% | 0.82% | 2.95% |
| Hispanic or Latino (any race) | 208 | 192 | 333 | 790 | 1,156 | 0.69% | 0.71% | 1.22% | 3.02% | 4.72% |
| Total | 29,997 | 27,148 | 27,401 | 26,171 | 24,502 | 100.00% | 100.00% | 100.00% | 100.00% | 100.00% |

=== 2020 census ===
As of the 2020 census, the county had a population of 24,502. The median age was 43.3 years. 22.5% of residents were under the age of 18 and 21.4% of residents were 65 years of age or older. For every 100 females there were 98.3 males, and for every 100 females age 18 and over there were 96.3 males age 18 and over.

The racial makeup of the county was 92.2% White, 0.5% Black or African American, 0.3% American Indian and Alaska Native, 0.3% Asian, <0.1% Native Hawaiian and Pacific Islander, 2.6% from some other race, and 4.0% from two or more races. Hispanic or Latino residents of any race comprised 4.7% of the population.

33.4% of residents lived in urban areas, while 66.6% lived in rural areas.

There were 10,193 households in the county, of which 27.2% had children under the age of 18 living in them. Of all households, 48.9% were married-couple households, 19.1% were households with a male householder and no spouse or partner present, and 24.3% were households with a female householder and no spouse or partner present. About 29.3% of all households were made up of individuals and 14.2% had someone living alone who was 65 years of age or older.

There were 11,394 housing units, of which 10.5% were vacant. Among occupied housing units, 73.7% were owner-occupied and 26.3% were renter-occupied. The homeowner vacancy rate was 2.0% and the rental vacancy rate was 9.1%.

=== 2010 census ===
As of the 2010 United States census, there were 26,171 people, 10,451 households, and 7,300 families residing in the county. The population density was 57.9 inhabitants per square mile (22.4/km^{2}). There were 11,743 housing units at an average density of 26.0 per square mile (10.0/km^{2}). The racial makeup of the county was 96.1% white, 0.4% black or African American, 0.3% American Indian, 0.2% Asian, 1.8% from other races, and 1.1% from two or more races. Those of Hispanic or Latino origin made up 3.0% of the population. In terms of ancestry, 23.7% were German, 13.9% were Irish, 11.5% were American, and 11.4% were English.

Of the 10,451 households, 31.9% had children under the age of 18 living with them, 53.9% were married couples living together, 11.1% had a female householder with no husband present, 30.2% were non-families, and 25.7% of all households were made up of individuals. The average household size was 2.47 and the average family size was 2.93. The median age was 40.8 years.

The median income for a household in the county was $47,697 and the median income for a family was $45,543. Males had a median income of $37,528 versus $28,851 for females. The per capita income for the county was $19,552. About 10.3% of families and 13.2% of the population were below the poverty line, including 20.3% of those under age 18 and 8.7% of those age 65 or over.

== See also ==
- National Register of Historic Places listings in Randolph County, Indiana
