= New Pittsburg, Indiana =

- Unincorporated community
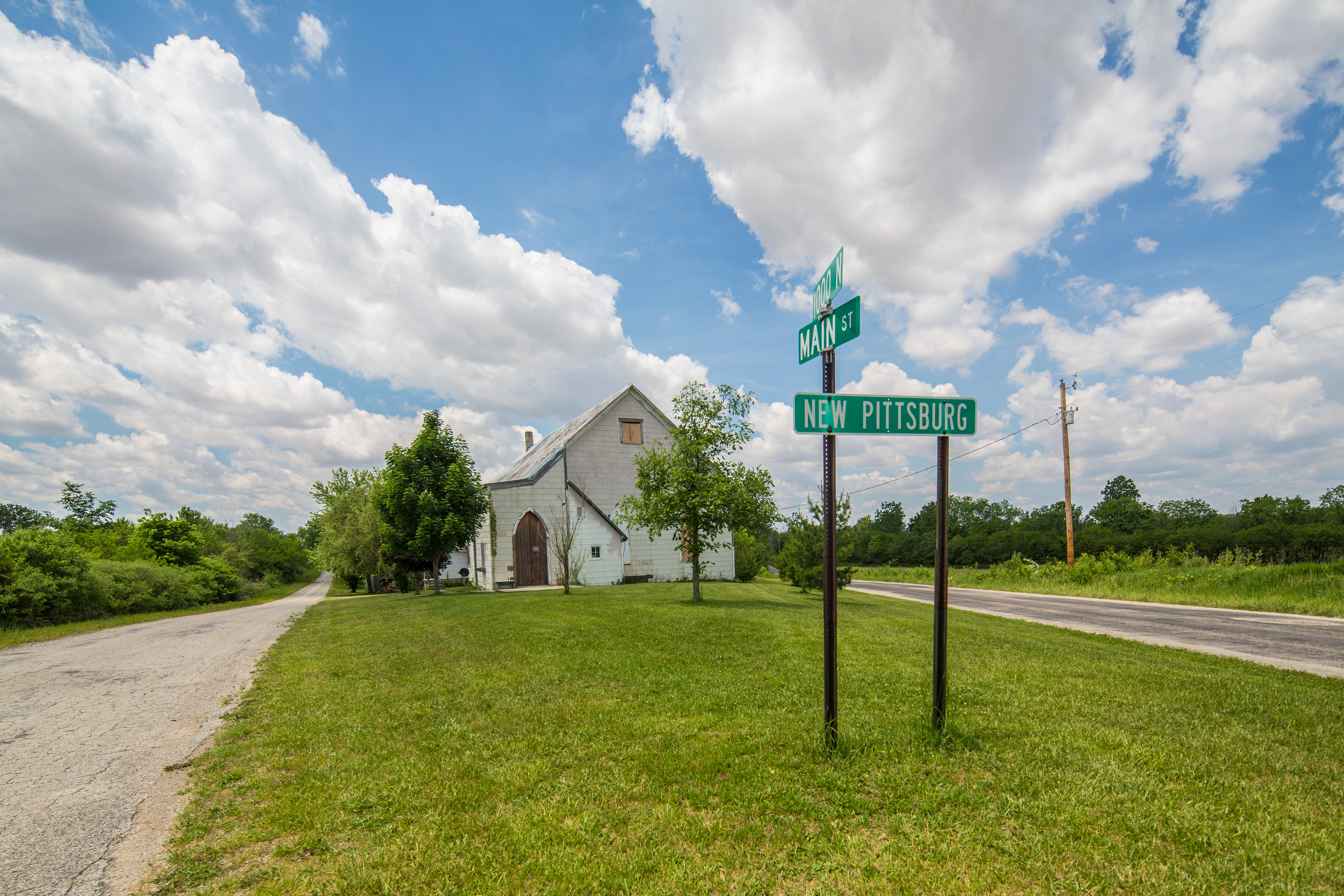

- Location within Indiana Location within the United States
- Coordinates: 40°18′27″N 84°53′57″W
- Country: United States
- State: Indiana
- County: Randolph
- Township: Jackson
- Elevation: 1,034 ft (315 m)
- Time zone: UTC-5 (Eastern (EST))
  - Summer (DST): UTC-4 (EDT)
- ZIP code: 47390
- Area code: 765
- FIPS code: 18-53442
- GNIS feature ID: 449701

New Pittsburg is an unincorporated community in Jackson Township, Randolph County, in the U.S. state of Indiana.

== History ==
New Pittsburg was platted in 1856. The community took its name from Pittsburgh, Pennsylvania. A post office was established at New Pittsburgh in 1858, and remained in operation until 1907.
