= Whitewater River (Great Miami River tributary) =

Coordinates: 39°6′34″N 84°48′57″W

Location
- Country: United States
- States: Indiana, Ohio

Physical characteristics
- Mouth: Great Miami River
- Length: 101 miles (163 km)
- Discharge
  - location: mouth
  - average: 1,663.79 cu ft/s (47.113 m^{3}/s) (estimate)

Basin features
- Waterbodies: Brookville Lake

The Whitewater River is a 101-mile-long (163 km) southerly flowing right tributary of the Great Miami River in southeastern Indiana and southwestern Ohio in the United States. It is formed by the confluence of two forks, the West Fork and East Fork. The name is a misnomer, as there is no true white water on the river. However, there are many rapids due to the steep gradient present - the river falls an average of six feet per mile (1.1 m/km). The gradient rendered upstream navigation impossible, and in the mid-nineteenth century resulted in the construction of the Whitewater Canal paralleling the river from north of Connersville, Indiana, to the Ohio River.

The West Fork, shown as the main stem of the river on federal maps, rises in Randolph County, Indiana, approximately 1 mile (1.6 km) northeast of Modoc. It flows 69.5 miles (111.8 km) south and southeast, past Hagerstown and Connersville, and joins the East Fork of the river at Brookville, Indiana.

The 56.7-mile-long (91.2 km) East Fork rises in Darke County, Ohio, approximately 10 miles (16 km) northwest of New Paris. It flows south, through Richmond, Indiana, and joins the West Fork of the river at Brookville, Indiana.

From the junction the Whitewater flows southeasterly into Ohio where it eventually joins the Great Miami River, a tributary of the Ohio River.

Following continual flooding problems on the East Fork, and to help control flooding in the Ohio River, the East Fork was dammed by the US Army Corps of Engineers to create Brookville Lake in 1974. Brookville Lake extends 17 miles (27 km) from just south of Liberty, Indiana, to Brookville.

Cities and towns on the Whitewater River (north to south) include Hagerstown, Cambridge City, Connersville, Laurel, Metamora, Brookville, Harrison (Ohio). Richmond, Indiana is on the East Fork of the Whitewater River and is the most significant town in the river valley, containing most of the population of the valley. The West Fork of the river is paralleled by State Road 121 from Connersville to 5 miles (8 km) west of Brookville, thence by U.S. Route 52 to the Ohio River.

== Whitewater Valley ==
The region surrounding the Whitewater River is known as the Whitewater Valley. The melting Wisconsin ice cap starting about 21,000 years ago created the Whitewater Valley basin as we know it today. The Whitewater Valley encompasses approximately 80 miles (130 km) between Hagerstown in Wayne County and Lawrenceburg in Dearborn County on the Ohio River. The Whitewater River and its valley were the main conduit of settlement of southeastern and eastern Indiana from Cincinnati and Clarksville (opposite Louisville) on the Ohio River during the first half of the nineteenth century, prior to the construction of railroads.

The Indianapolis and Cincinnati Railroad constructed a line known as the Whitewater Railroad in 1863–1868 on the tow path of the Whitewater Canal, from Hagerstown to just west of Cincinnati. It brought to an end the commercial importance of the river and the canal.

== Recreation ==
The river today is devoted to scenic and recreational uses.

== See also ==
- List of Indiana rivers
- List of rivers of Ohio
