= Windsor, Indiana =

- Census-designated place
- Location within Indiana Location within the United States
- Coordinates: 40°09′22″N 85°12′57″W
- Country: United States
- State: Indiana
- Counties: Randolph, Delaware
- Townships: Stoney Creek, Liberty
- Founded: January 30, 1832
- Elevation: 1,017 ft (310 m)
- Time zone: UTC-5 (Eastern (EST))
  - Summer (DST): UTC-4 (EDT)
- ZIP code: 47368
- Area code: 765
- GNIS feature ID: 2830360

Windsor is an unincorporated community and census-designated place (CDP) in Randolph and Delaware counties, in the U.S. state of Indiana.

== History ==
Windsor was laid out on January 30, 1832. The community most likely was named after Windsor Castle. A post office was established at Windsor in 1831, and remained in operation until it was discontinued in 1898.

== Demographics ==
Historical population
| Census | Pop. | Note | %± |
|---|---|---|---|
| 2023 (est.) | 0 |

The United States Census Bureau defined Windsor as a census designated place in the 2022 American Community Survey.
