= Parker City, Indiana =

- Town
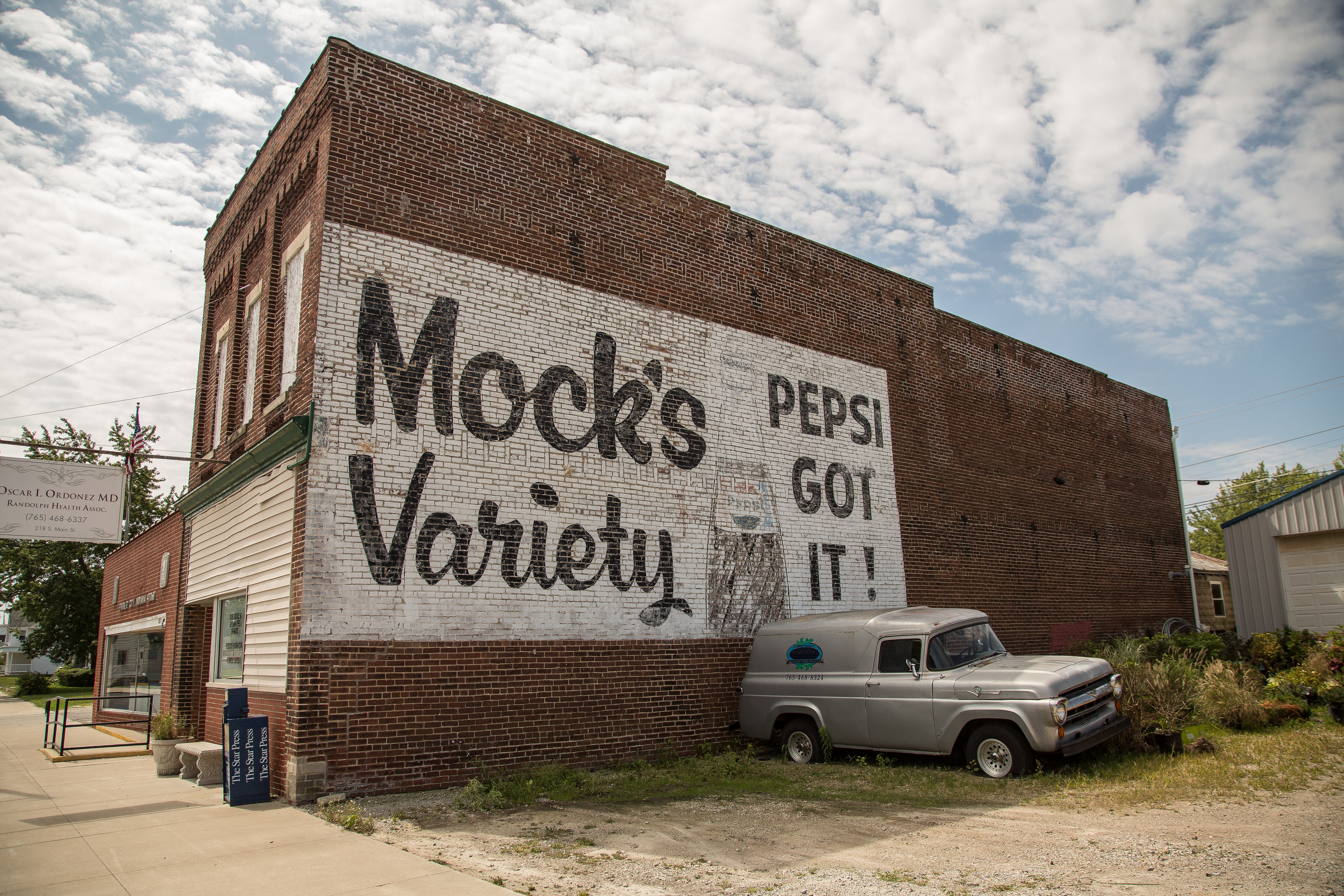

- Logo

- Location of Parker City in Randolph County, Indiana.
- Coordinates: 40°11′23″N 85°12′13″W
- Country: United States
- State: Indiana
- County: Randolph
- Township: Monroe

Area
  - Total: 0.58 sq mi (1.49 km^{2})
  - Land: 0.58 sq mi (1.49 km^{2})
  - Water: 0 sq mi (0.00 km^{2})
- Elevation: 1,024 ft (312 m)

Population (2020)
  - Total: 1,278
  - Estimate (2025): 1,251 ▼
  - Density: 2,221.9/sq mi (857.88/km^{2})
- Time zone: UTC-5 (Eastern (EST))
  - Summer (DST): UTC-4 (EDT)
- ZIP code: 47368
- Area code: 765
- FIPS code: 18-57978
- GNIS feature ID: 2396848
- Website: townofparkercity.com

Parker City is a town in Monroe Township, Randolph County, in the U.S. state of Indiana. The population was 1,278 at the 2020 census.

== History ==
Parker City was originally called Morristown, and under the latter name was platted in 1851. A post office has been in operation at Parker City since 1853.

== Geography ==
According to the 2010 census, Parker City has a total area of 0.57 square miles (1.48 km^{2}), all land. It is located at an elevation of 1025 feet.

== Demographics ==
Historical population
Census	Pop.	Note	%±
1900	909		—
1910	800		−12.0%
1920	697		−12.9%
1930	794		13.9%
1940	786		−1.0%
1950	915		16.4%
1960	1,181		29.1%
1970	1,179		−0.2%
1980	1,414		19.9%
1990	1,323		−6.4%
2000	1,416		7.0%
2010	1,419		0.2%
2020	1,278		−9.9%
2025 (est.)	1,251	▼	−2.1%
U.S. Decennial Census

=== 2020 census ===
As of the 2020 census, Parker City had a population of 1,278. The median age was 45.8 years. 20.0% of residents were under the age of 18 and 24.5% of residents were 65 years of age or older. For every 100 females there were 81.8 males, and for every 100 females age 18 and over there were 79.0 males age 18 and over.

0.0% of residents lived in urban areas, while 100.0% lived in rural areas.

There were 537 households in Parker City, of which 27.6% had children under the age of 18 living in them. Of all households, 40.8% were married-couple households, 18.4% were households with a male householder and no spouse or partner present, and 32.2% were households with a female householder and no spouse or partner present. About 33.7% of all households were made up of individuals and 17.3% had someone living alone who was 65 years of age or older.

There were 589 housing units, of which 8.8% were vacant. The homeowner vacancy rate was 1.5% and the rental vacancy rate was 8.9%.

Racial composition as of the 2020 census
Race	Number	Percent
White	1,227	96.0%
Black or African American	10	0.8%
American Indian and Alaska Native	2	0.2%
Asian	4	0.3%
Native Hawaiian and Other Pacific Islander	0	0.0%
Some other race	7	0.5%
Two or more races	28	2.2%
Hispanic or Latino (of any race)	22	1.7%

=== 2010 census ===
As of the census of 2010, there were 1,419 people, 544 households, and 372 families living in the town. The population density was 2,489.5 inhabitants per square mile (961.2/km^{2}). There were 605 housing units at an average density of 1,061.4 per square mile (409.8/km^{2}). The racial makeup of the town was 97.7% White, 0.5% African American, 0.4% Native American, 0.1% from other races, and 1.4% from two or more races. Hispanic or Latino of any race were 0.4% of the population.

There were 544 households, of which 35.1% had children under the age of 18 living with them, 48.3% were married couples living together, 15.6% had a female householder with no husband present, 4.4% had a male householder with no wife present, and 31.6% were non-families. 27.6% of all households were made up of individuals, and 12.3% had someone living alone who was 65 years of age or older. The average household size was 2.46 and the average family size was 2.98.

The median age in the town was 40.5 years. 25.3% of residents were under the age of 18; 7.2% were between the ages of 18 and 24; 23.1% were from 25 to 44; 24.9% were from 45 to 64; and 19.4% were 65 years of age or older. The gender makeup of the town was 46.4% male and 53.6% female.

=== 2000 census ===
As of the census of 2000, there were 1,416 people, 549 households, and 390 families living in the town. The population density was 2,444.0 inhabitants per square mile (943.6/km^{2}). There were 595 housing units at an average density of 1,026.9 per square mile (396.5/km^{2}). The racial makeup of the town was 99.15% White, 0.14% African American, 0.14% Native American, 0.07% Asian, 0.07% Pacific Islander, 0.07% from other races, and 0.35% from two or more races. Hispanic or Latino of any race were 0.35% of the population.

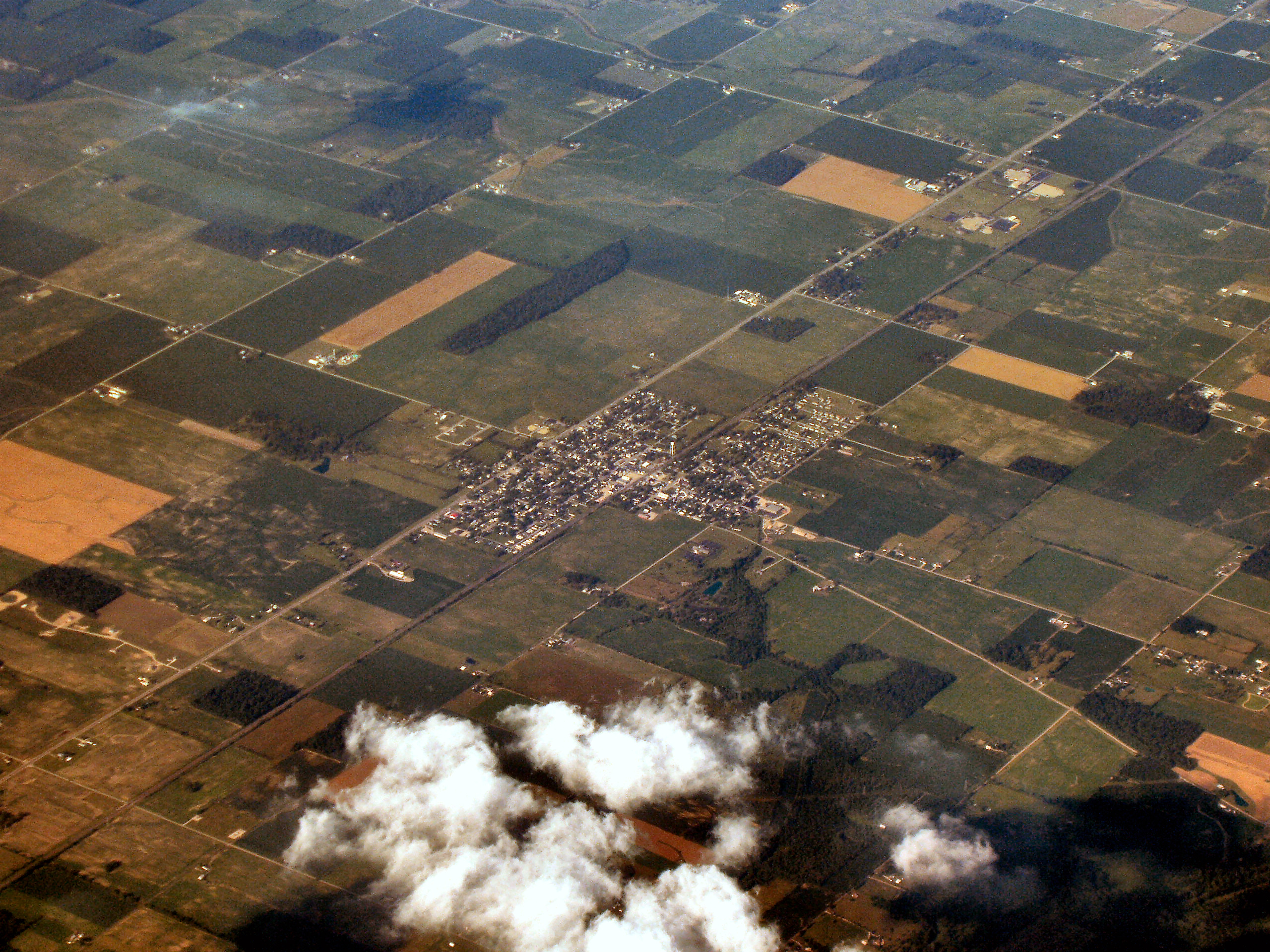
Parker City from the air, looking northeast.

There were 549 households, out of which 33.7% had children under the age of 18 living with them, 54.5% were married couples living together, 13.5% had a female householder with no husband present, and 28.8% were non-families. 24.2% of all households were made up of individuals, and 10.4% had someone living alone who was 65 years of age or older. The average household size was 2.45 and the average family size was 2.91.

In the town, the population was spread out, with 24.9% under the age of 18, 8.1% from 18 to 24, 28.4% from 25 to 44, 21.8% from 45 to 64, and 16.9% who were 65 years of age or older. The median age was 38 years. For every 100 females, there were 88.0 males. For every 100 females age 18 and over, there were 80.3 males.

The median income for a household in the town was $34,500, and the median income for a family was $38,984. Males had a median income of $31,875 versus $20,909 for females. The per capita income for the town was $16,552. About 9.9% of families and 12.8% of the population were below the poverty line, including 26.5% of those under age 18 and 6.9% of those age 65 or over.

== Education ==
It is in the Monroe Central School Corporation.
