= White River Township, Randolph County, Indiana =

White River Township
- Township
- Coordinates: 40°10′31″N 85°00′21″W
- Country: United States
- State: Indiana
- County: Randolph

Government
  - Type: Indiana township

Area
  - Total: 74.63 sq mi (193.3 km^{2})
  - Land: 74.47 sq mi (192.9 km^{2})
  - Water: 0.16 sq mi (0.41 km^{2})
- Elevation: 1,099 ft (335 m)

Population (2020)
  - Total: 7,132
  - Density: 95.77/sq mi (36.98/km^{2})
- Time zone: UTC-5 (Eastern (EST))
  - Summer (DST): UTC-4 (EDT)
- Area code: 765
- FIPS code: 18-83942
- GNIS feature ID: 454056

White River Township is one of eleven townships in Randolph County, Indiana, United States. As of the 2020 census, its population was 7,132 (down from 7,513 at 2010) and it contained 3,385 housing units.

== History ==
White River Township was established in 1818.

== Geography ==
According to the 2010 census, the township has a total area of 74.63 square miles (193.3 km^{2}), of which 74.47 square miles (192.9 km^{2}) (or 99.79%) is land and 0.16 square miles (0.41 km^{2}) (or 0.21%) is water.

=== Cities and towns ===
- Winchester

=== Unincorporated towns ===
- Buena Vista at 40.1206006°N 85.0730218°W
- Maxville at 40.1722665°N 85.1058006°W

(This list is based on USGS data and may include former settlements.)

== Education ==
White River Township residents may obtain a free library card from the Winchester Community Public Library in Winchester.
