= McVey Memorial Forest =

Forest in Randolph County, Indiana

Coordinates: 40°16′18″N 85°08′45″W

McVey Memorial Forest is located near State Route 9999 in Randolph County, Indiana. Located within the forest is Cherry Grove Cemetery which contains many historical grave sites from a local 19th century settlement known as Steubenville. With the exception of posted signs and Cherry Grove Cemetery, no other evidence of Stuebenville's existence is apparent, making it a ghost town. The site also contains a memorial for three fallen soldiers from the War of 1812.

== Recreational opportunities ==
- Hiking
- Nature center
- Canoe run
- Wildlife observation area
