= Huntsville, Randolph County, Indiana =

Huntsville
- Unincorporated community
- Location within Indiana Location within the United States
- Coordinates: 40°04′16″N 85°04′20″W
- Country: United States
- State: Indiana
- County: Randolph
- Township: Union
- Elevation: 1,161 ft (354 m)
- Time zone: UTC-5 (Eastern (EST))
  - Summer (DST): UTC-4 (EDT)
- ZIP code: 47358
- Area code: 765
- FIPS code: 18-35356
- GNIS feature ID: 436639

Huntsville is an unincorporated community in Union Township, Randolph County, in the U.S. state of Indiana.

== History ==
Huntsville was platted in 1834. The community was named for its founder, Miles Hunt.
