= Farmland, Indiana =

- Town
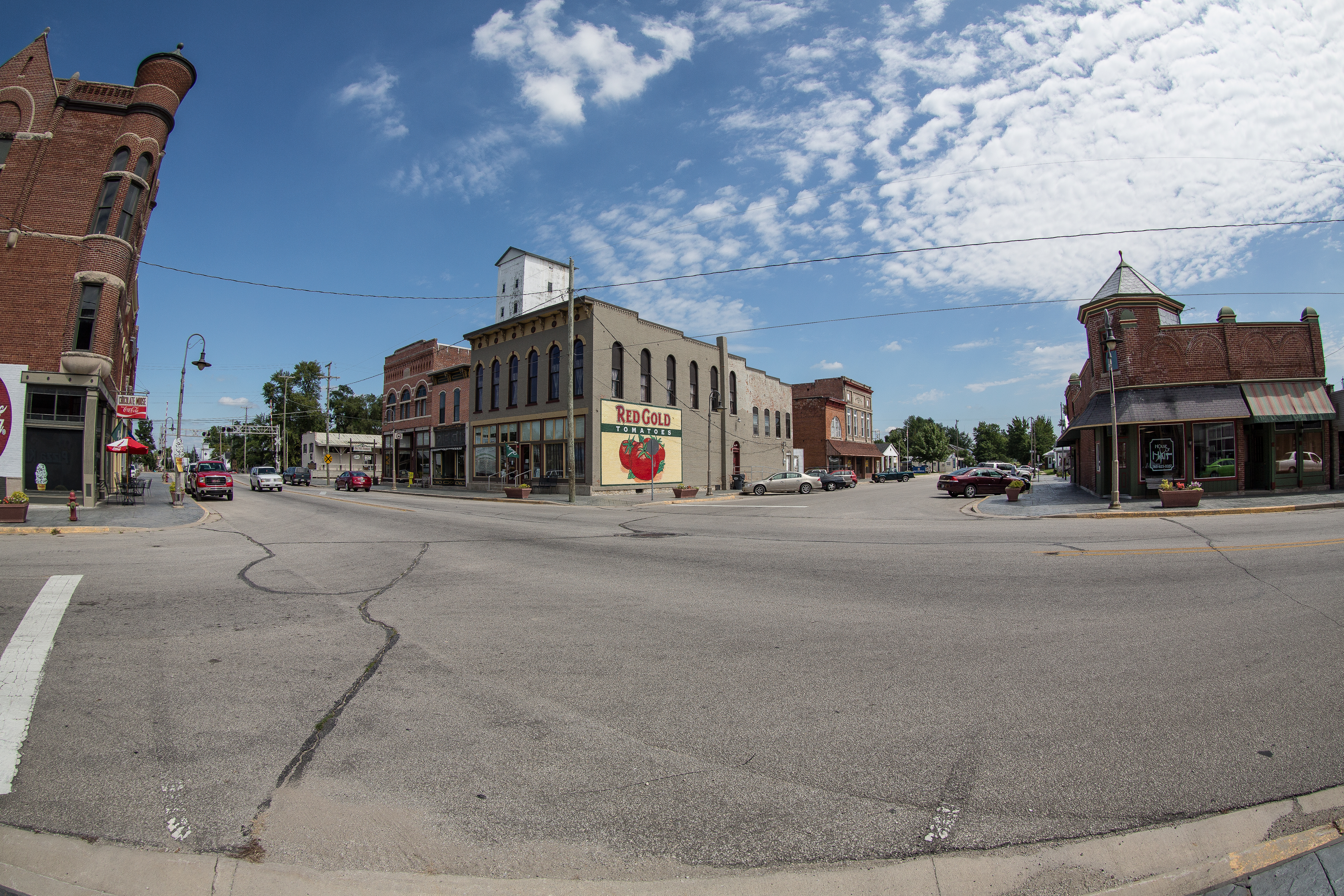

- Logo

- Location of Farmland in Randolph County, Indiana.
- Coordinates: 40°11′25″N 85°07′28″W
- Country: United States
- State: Indiana
- County: Randolph
- Township: Monroe

Area
  - Total: 0.53 sq mi (1.38 km^{2})
  - Land: 0.53 sq mi (1.38 km^{2})
  - Water: 0 sq mi (0.00 km^{2})
- Elevation: 1,027 ft (313 m)

Population (2020)
  - Total: 1,270
  - Estimate (2025): 1,236 ▼
  - Density: 2,392/sq mi (923.6/km^{2})
- Time zone: UTC-5 (EST)
  - Summer (DST): UTC-5 (EST)
- ZIP code: 47340
- Area code: 765
- FIPS code: 18-22792
- GNIS feature ID: 2396935
- Website: www.farmlandindiana.us

Farmland is a town in Monroe Township, Randolph County, in the U.S. state of Indiana. The population was 1,270 at the 2020 census.

== History ==
The Randolph County location has rolling hills, glacial features, and the Cabin Creek Raised Bog. Farmland was platted in 1852 when the railroad was extended to that point. The town most likely was so named on account of its fertile soil. A post office has been in operation at Farmland since 1853. Farmland was incorporated as a town in 1867.

The Farmland Downtown Historic District was listed on the National Register of Historic Places in 1994.

A sign posted by the state highway department welcomes people to Farmland and notes that it is "The Home of Ansel Toney, The Kite Man".

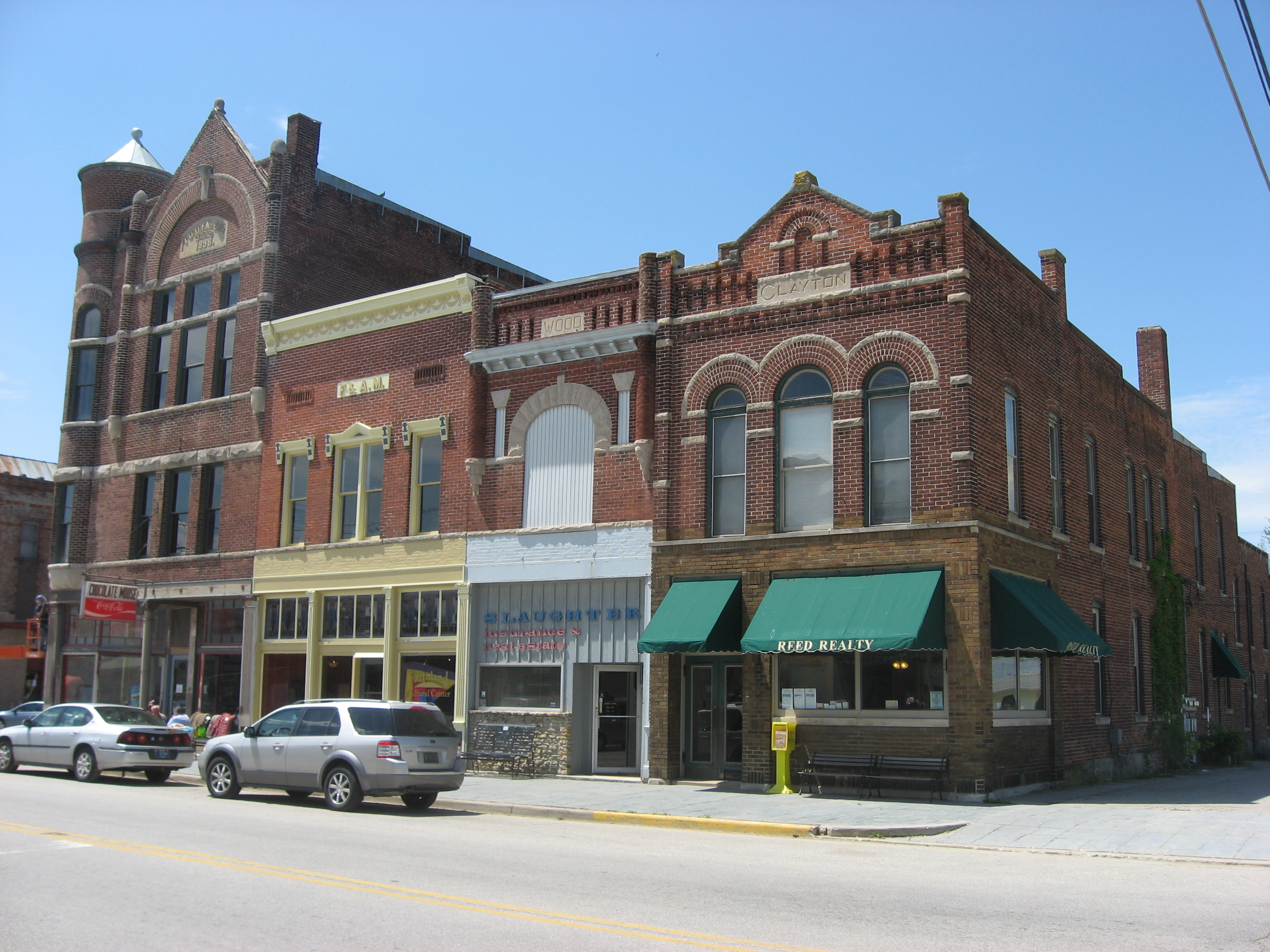
Farmland's downtown

== Geography ==
According to the 2010 census, Farmland has a total area of 0.53 square miles (1.37 km^{2}), all land.

== Demographics ==
Historical population
| Census | Pop. | Note | %± |
|---|---|---|---|
| 1870 | 532 | | — |
| 1880 | 661 | | 24.2% |
| 1890 | 770 | | 16.5% |
| 1900 | 870 | | 13.0% |
| 1910 | 907 | | 4.3% |
| 1920 | 878 | | −3.2% |
| 1930 | 853 | | −2.8% |
| 1940 | 914 | | 7.2% |
| 1950 | 943 | | 3.2% |
| 1960 | 1,102 | | 16.9% |
| 1970 | 1,262 | | 14.5% |
| 1980 | 1,560 | | 23.6% |
| 1990 | 1,412 | | −9.5% |
| 2000 | 1,456 | | 3.1% |
| 2010 | 1,333 | | −8.4% |
| 2020 | 1,270 | | −4.7% |
| 2025 (est.) | 1,236 | ▼ | −2.7% |
U.S. Decennial Census

=== 2020 census ===
As of the 2020 census, Farmland had a population of 1,270. The median age was 43.2 years. 22.4% of residents were under the age of 18 and 21.5% were 65 years of age or older. For every 100 females, there were 90.1 males, and for every 100 females age 18 and over, there were 86.6 males age 18 and over.

0.0% of residents lived in urban areas, while 100.0% lived in rural areas.

There were 543 households, of which 28.9% had children under the age of 18 living in them. Of all households, 48.4% were married-couple households, 15.5% were households with a male householder and no spouse or partner present, and 28.2% were households with a female householder and no spouse or partner present. About 28.5% of all households were made up of individuals, and 14.1% had someone living alone who was 65 years of age or older.

There were 592 housing units, of which 8.3% were vacant. The homeowner vacancy rate was 1.0% and the rental vacancy rate was 9.6%.

Racial composition as of the 2020 census
| Race | Number | Percent |
|---|---|---|
| White | 1,193 | 93.9% |
| Black or African American | 3 | 0.2% |
| American Indian and Alaska Native | 3 | 0.2% |
| Asian | 0 | 0.0% |
| Native Hawaiian and Other Pacific Islander | 0 | 0.0% |
| Some other race | 7 | 0.6% |
| Two or more races | 64 | 5.0% |
| Hispanic or Latino (of any race) | 19 | 1.5% |

=== 2010 census ===
As of the 2010 census, there were 1,333 people, 543 households, and 375 families living in the town. The population density was 2,515.1 inhabitants per square mile (971.1/km^{2}). There were 612 housing units at an average density of 1,154.7 per square mile (445.8/km^{2}). The racial makeup of the town was 97.3% White, 0.2% African American, 1.4% Native American, 0.1% Asian, 0.2% from other races, and 1.0% from two or more races. Hispanic or Latino of any race were 1.1% of the population.

There were 543 households, of which 32.6% had children under the age of 18 living with them, 52.5% were married couples living together, 13.3% had a female householder with no husband present, 3.3% had a male householder with no wife present, and 30.9% were non-families. 26.3% of all households were made up of individuals, and 12.2% had someone living alone who was 65 years of age or older. The average household size was 2.45 and the average family size was 2.94.

The median age in the town was 39.3 years. 24.4% of residents were under the age of 18; 8.1% were between the ages of 18 and 24; 24.8% were from 25 to 44; 27.1% were from 45 to 64; and 15.8% were 65 years of age or older. The gender makeup of the town was 48.0% male and 52.0% female.

=== 2000 census ===
As of the 2000 census, there were 1,456 people, 573 households, and 414 families living in the town. The population density was 2,898.1 inhabitants per square mile (1,119.0/km^{2}). There were 608 housing units at an average density of 1,210.2 per square mile (467.3/km^{2}). The racial makeup of the town was 98.49% White, 0.48% Native American, 0.07% Asian, 0.07% from other races, and 0.89% from two or more races. Hispanic or Latino of any race were 0.21% of the population.

There were 573 households, out of which 34.4% had children under the age of 18 living with them, 58.3% were married couples living together, 10.5% had a female householder with no husband present, and 27.7% were non-families. 23.7% of all households were made up of individuals, and 11.2% had someone living alone who was 65 years of age or older. The average household size was 2.54 and the average family size was 3.03.

In the town, the population was spread out, with 28.0% under the age of 18, 6.7% from 18 to 24, 28.4% from 25 to 44, 21.0% from 45 to 64, and 15.9% who were 65 years of age or older. The median age was 36 years. For every 100 females, there were 92.3 males. For every 100 females age 18 and over, there were 86.0 males.

The median income for a household in the town was $36,250, and the median income for a family was $45,000. Males had a median income of $31,795 versus $21,750 for females. The per capita income for the town was $18,405. About 3.4% of families and 6.5% of the population were below the poverty line, including 7.4% of those under age 18 and 3.5% of those age 65 or over.

== Education ==
It is in the Monroe Central School Corporation.

The town has a lending library, the Farmland Public Library.
