= Stoney Creek Township, Randolph County, Indiana =

Stoney Creek Township
- Township
- Coordinates: 40°08′19″N 85°09′21″W
- Country: United States
- State: Indiana
- County: Randolph

Government
  - Type: Indiana township

Area
  - Total: 26.76 sq mi (69.3 km^{2})
  - Land: 26.69 sq mi (69.1 km^{2})
  - Water: 0.07 sq mi (0.18 km^{2})
- Elevation: 1,047 ft (319 m)

Population (2020)
  - Total: 880
  - Density: 33/sq mi (13/km^{2})
- Time zone: UTC-5 (Eastern (EST))
  - Summer (DST): UTC-4 (EDT)
- Area code: 765
- FIPS code: 18-73478
- GNIS feature ID: 453878

Stoney Creek Township is one of eleven townships in Randolph County, Indiana. As of the 2020 census, its population was 880 (down from 990 at 2010) and it contained 409 housing units.

Stoney Creek Township was established in 1826.

== Geography ==
According to the 2010 census, the township has a total area of 26.76 square miles (69.3 km^{2}), of which 26.69 square miles (69.1 km^{2}) (or 99.74%) is land and 0.07 square miles (0.18 km^{2}) (or 0.26%) is water.

=== Unincorporated towns ===
- Georgetown at 40.1708776°N 85.1291341°W
- Pinch at 40.1067118°N 85.1463554°W
- Windsor at 40.1544887°N 85.2127456°W

(This list is based on USGS data and may include former settlements.)
