= Unionport, Indiana =

- Unincorporated community
- Location within Indiana Location within the United States
- Coordinates: 40°07′15″N 85°05′47″W
- Country: United States
- State: Indiana
- County: Randolph
- Township: Union
- Elevation: 1,083 ft (330 m)
- Time zone: UTC-5 (Eastern (EST))
  - Summer (DST): UTC-4 (EDT)
- ZIP code: 47340
- Area code: 765
- GNIS feature ID: 445137

Unionport is an unincorporated community in Union Township, Randolph County, in the U.S. state of Indiana.

== History ==
Unionport was platted in 1837. The community took its name from Union Township. A post office was established at Unionport in 1878, and remained in operation until it was discontinued in 1902.
