= Duane Richards =

American baseball player (born 1936)

- Pitcher
- Born: December 16, 1936 (age 89); Spartanburg, Indiana, U.S.
- Batted: Right Threw: Right

MLB debut
- September 25, 1960, for the Cincinnati Reds

Last MLB appearance
- October 1, 1960, for the Cincinnati Reds

MLB statistics
- Win–loss record: 0–0
- Earned run average: 9.00
- Strikeouts: 2
- Stats at Baseball Reference

Teams
- Cincinnati Reds (1960)

Duane Lee Richards (born December 16, 1936) is an American former professional baseball pitcher who appeared in two games in the major leagues for the 1960 Cincinnati Reds. Born in Spartanburg, Indiana, he threw and batted right-handed, stood 6 feet 3 inches (1.91 m) tall and weighed 200 pounds (91 kg) during his active career.

Richards was signed by the Cincinnati organization as an amateur free agent in 1955, and progressed slowly from the Class D level, where he spent his first three pro seasons, to Double-A Nashville by 1960. That September he was recalled by the Reds when rosters expanded to 40 men after September 1.

His two appearances in MLB came in relief against the Philadelphia Phillies. In his first game, on September 25, 1960, Richards faced the Phillies at Crosley Field. He entered the game in the top of the fifth inning with the Reds trailing, 5–0. He hurled one inning, and gave up two hits and two runs, while walking one and striking out one. Richards' second and last MLB appearance took place on October 1, against Philadelphia at Connie Mack Stadium. He entered the game in the bottom of the fifth with the Reds behind, 4–2. This time, Richards lasted two innings, allowing three hits and two runs, one of which was unearned. He also walked one batter and struck out one.

In 1961, he returned to the minor leagues, where he spent the remainder of his ten-year (1955–1964), 311-game pro career.
