= Kathryn Magnolia Johnson =

American civil rights activist (1878–1954)

- Born: December 15, 1878; Darke County, Ohio
- Died: November 13, 1954 (aged 75)
- Education: Wilberforce University
- Occupations: Political Activist, Teacher, Dean of Women
- Notable work: Two Colored Women with the American Expeditionary Forces (1920)

Kathryn Magnolia Johnson (December 15, 1878 – November 13, 1954) was an American political activist who began working as a teacher before becoming one of the first members of the National Association for the Advancement of Colored People. After criticizing the organization's all white leadership roles, Johnson joined the Young Men's Christian Association. After the organization sent Johnson to France to observe during World War I, Johnson published a book about her findings called, Two Colored Women with the American Expeditionary Forces (1920). This book was written with Addie Waites Hunton. The rest of Johnson's life was dedicated to spreading African American activism across the states through book selling to help in the campaign for civil rights.

== Early life ==
Kathryn Magnolia Johnson was born on December 15, 1878, in Darke County, Ohio, at the Greenville Settlement, also known as Longtown. Johnson's parents were Walter and Lucinda Jane McCown Johnson; her brother was Joseph Lowery Johnson, a physician who would become U.S. ambassador to Liberia.

Johnson went to high school in New Paris, Ohio, and graduated in 1895. Johnson received a bachelor's degree and a teaching certificate after she attended Wilberforce University in Wilberforce, Ohio. Johnson also studied at the University of North Dakota in 1908.

== Teaching career and activism ==
Johnson's career began as a teacher in Ohio, North Carolina and Kansas City. Johnson taught at the State Normal School for Negroes in North Carolina and then was also the Dean of Women at Shorter College in Little Rock, Ark. in 1906. While teaching in a high school, Johnson joined the National Association for the Advancement of Colored People as one of the first members when it was first formed in 1909. During her time in the association, Johnson was a sales representative for the NAACP's journal, The Crisis. As a branch organizer in the association, she was also responsible for helping dozens of branches of the association throughout the south.

However, Johnson began to criticize that the NAACP failed to have any colored people as leaders so Johnson left the association in 1916. Johnson joined the Young Men's Christian Association. In the YMCA, Johnson worked amongst African Americans. The YMCA ended up sending Johnson and her coworker, Addie Waites Hunton, to France. In France, they were responsible for examining the treatment of black soldiers during World War I. In 1918, Kathryn M. Johnson, as volunteer and secretary with the YMCA WWI France, established the Frederick Douglas Hut at Camp Pontenezen outside of Brest, France. Kathryn developed an education system for Black soldiers teaching them how to read and write. Many were from farming and never had the opportunity to gather formal education. Many could sign an X to their paystubs. Many couldn't write home because of their illiteracy. Eventually the Army command mandated that all illiterate Black soldiers had to take Kathryn's course. Once they returned home, Johnson and Waites wrote the book Two Colored Women with the American Expeditionary Forces (1920). The book described the poor treatment black soldiers observed in the cultural climate of France during the war.

== Later life and legacy ==
Johnson's mission after returning from France was to spread activism against racial oppression by promoting literacy. Johnson began a nationwide campaign to help improve the civil rights through promoting literacy. This included selling books from black authors called "A Two Foot Shelf of Negro Literature" and selecting and circulating literature by Carter G, Woodson, W. E. B. Du Bois, Benjamin Brawley and James Weldon Johnson. By being a bookseller, Johnson hoped to promote reading among African Americans in order for them to learn more about their historical contributions and hopefully to then inspire them to take action in fight against racial oppression. Over the years, Johnson had traveled over "9,000 miles and sold 15,000 books." Johnson's work also helped showed the possibilities as well as restrictions that African American women had during this time period.

During her old age, Kathryn Magnolia Johnson lived in Ezella Mathias Carter Home for Colored Working Women in Chicago. Johnson died on November 13, 1954.
