= John Seys =

American reverend and diplomat

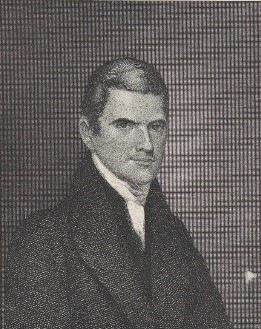
- print published in 1835

United States Ambassador to Liberia
- In office January 2, 1867 – June 11, 1870
- President: Andrew Johnson
- Preceded by: Abraham Hanson
- Succeeded by: James Milton Turner

Personal details
- Born: Jan Seij; March 30, 1799 St. Croix
- Died: February 9, 1872 (aged 72) Springfield, Ohio
- Children: 12
- Occupation: Reverend

John Seys (March 30, 1799 – February 9, 1872) was an American reverend, missionary, and diplomat.

== Biography ==
Seys was born in St. Croix, in the Danish West Indies, to a wealthy white family on March 30, 1799. Born Jan Seij, his family were slave owners. He anglicized his name when he moved to the British West Indies as a young adult.

Seys chose to work as a Methodist reverend (preacher in 1825 and ordained minister in 1829), and his family disinherited him for it. After ordination, he briefly served on the island of Tortola before obtaining a position in Ogdensburg, New York. He moved to Canton, New York, in 1832 and then became a missionary among the Oneida people in 1833. Following the death of his predecessor, Beveridge Cox, Seys led the Methodist mission in Liberia for ten years until poor health forced him to resign in 1844. During his time in leadership he became actively involved in establishing new schools in the country.

From 1856 to 1858, Seys served as a special agent of the American Colonization Society scouting settlement locations for freed slaves in Liberia that were at an elevated location less prone to malaria. This resulted in the founding of Careysburg in 1856, followed by the building of a chapel there. From 1858 to 1862, Seys acted as a United States government agent helping the freed passengers of slave ships captured by the U.S. Navy, having responsibility for up to four thousand men, women and children at a time. He also served as acting Consul General when the incumbent died.

Seys served as Minister Resident to Liberia from the United States from January 2, 1867, to June 11, 1870. In this position, Seys faced many obstacles due to the lack of funds coming from the United States. In a February 11, 1871, report to the U.S. House of Representatives, Representative Thomas Swann from the United States House Committee on Foreign Affairs stated that Seys "charges salary for sixty days, and also for fifty-eight days, transit in returning to his post, and for the services of W.A. Johnson, vice consul general, $166.66 for four months" which the committee recommended he not be paid. Despite this, he actively pushed against what he saw as the evils of slavery. Although he was opposed to the practice of slavery, he would write in defense of Captain Nathaniel Gordon at Gordon's trial for slave trafficking and piracy.

Seys was conferred an honorary D.D. degree by Indiana Asbury University in 1867. Returning to the United States in 1870, he retired to the Cincinnati, Ohio, area. Seys died on February 9, 1872, at his home in Springfield, Ohio after having fathered 12 children with five different women, however many died before him due to 'African fever.' He was interred at Ferncliff Cemetery in Springfield on February 13, 1872.
