= Spartanburg (disambiguation) =

Spartanburg is a city in the U.S. state of South Carolina.

- Spartanburg County, the county that the city is located

Spartanburg may also refer to:

== South Carolina ==
=== Education ===
- Spartanburg Community College
- Spartanburg County School District 7
- Spartanburg Day School
- Spartanburg High School
- Spartanburg Methodist College

=== Healthcare ===
- Spartanburg Regional Healthcare System

=== Sports ===
- Spartanburg Spinners, former minor-league baseball team

=== Transportation ===
- Spartanburg (Amtrak station)
- Spartanburg Downtown Memorial Airport
- Greenville-Spartanburg International Airport

== See also ==
- Spartanburg, Indiana, unincorporated community
- Spartansburg, Pennsylvania, small borough
