= Daily American Citizen (Kansas City, Kansas) =

African-American newspaper (e.1897)

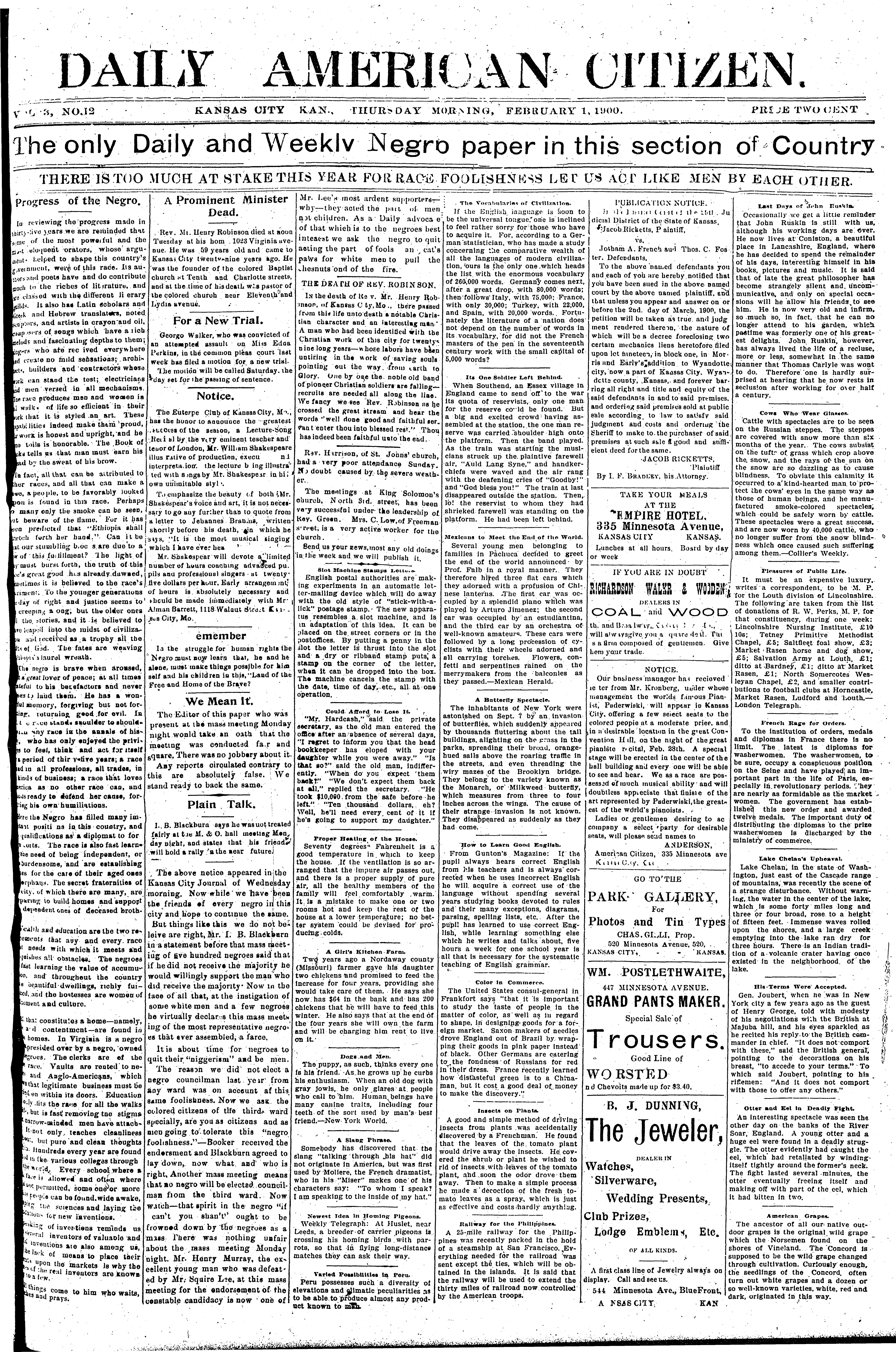
Front page of the Daily American Citizen, February 1, 1900 issue

The Daily American Citizen was a daily, excluding Mondays, African-American newspaper based in Kansas City, Kansas. It began serialization in 1897, published by the American Citizen Publishing Co. It served as the daily supplement to the weekly American Citizen, a newspaper founded by diplomat John L. Waller, that was based in Topeka, Kansas, and serialized from 1888 to 1909. However, The Daily American Citizen was published as an expansion by George A. Dudley, who was the business manager of the American Citizen at the time. The Daily American Citizen was considered “The only Daily and Weekly Negro paper in this section of the Country.”

== Content ==
The Daily American Citizen’s purpose was to report on the happenings of the African-American community across the United States, displaying the difficulties Black journalists faced as they reported on the transition into the 20th century.

Politically, the American Citizen initially aligned with the Republican party, but over the course of its serialization it saw many changes, becoming nonpartisan in 1891. However, this was short lasting as it returned to align with the Republican party. The Daily American Citizen, which was serialized after this brief transition, is considered a Republican newspaper.

== Cessation ==
The Daily American Citizen ceased publication in 1900, but the American Citizen continued until at least 1909. Reasons for why the American Citizen ended remain unclear.
