= Owen L. W. Smith =

American diplomat

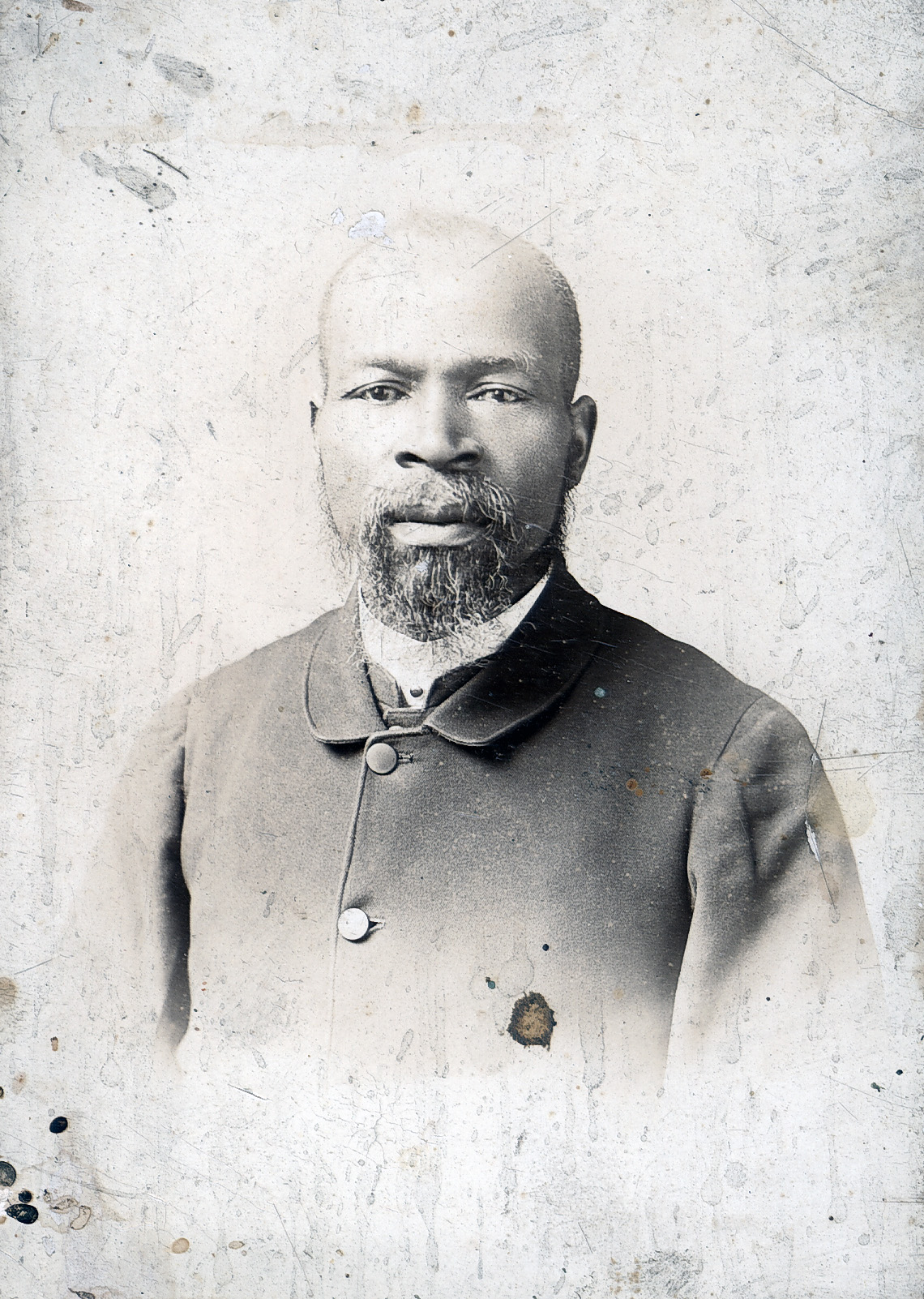

United States Minister to Liberia
- In office 1898–1902
- Preceded by: William H. Heard
- Succeeded by: John R. A. Crossland

Personal details
- Born: Owen Lun West Smith; May 18, 1851 Giddensville, Sampson County, North Carolina, US
- Died: January 5, 1926 (aged 74) Wilson, North Carolina, US
- Education: Livingstone College

Military service
- Allegiance: United States
- Branch/service: Union Army
- Battles/wars: American Civil War: Battle of Bentonville

Owen Lun West Smith (May 18, 1851 – January 5, 1926) was an American minister and diplomat of the United States. He served as minister to Liberia from 1898-1902.

== Biography ==
Smith was born into slavery in Giddensville, Sampson County, North Carolina, on May 18, 1851. At the start of the Civil War, he would follow the Confederate army while serving as a personal servant. Later on, however, he would enlist in the Union Army and go on to fight in the Battle of Bentonville.

After becoming a freedman, Smith worked as a teacher before getting a scholarship to attend the University of South Carolina from 1874 to 1876.

In 1880 Smith would convert to the African Methodist Episcopal Zion Church, while attending a camp in Whiteville, North Carolina; later on, by 1881, he would attain a preacher's license and was ordained as a local deacon. Following his conversion, he would go on to receive an honorary Doctor of Divinity degree from Livingstone College in 1883.

After having been appointed on February 11, 1898, Smith would go on to serve as the Minister Resident of the United States to Liberia between May 11, 1898, and May 13, 1902.

Smith died on January 5, 1926, in Wilson, North Carolina, where he was later buried.
