= William D. McCoy =

American diplomat

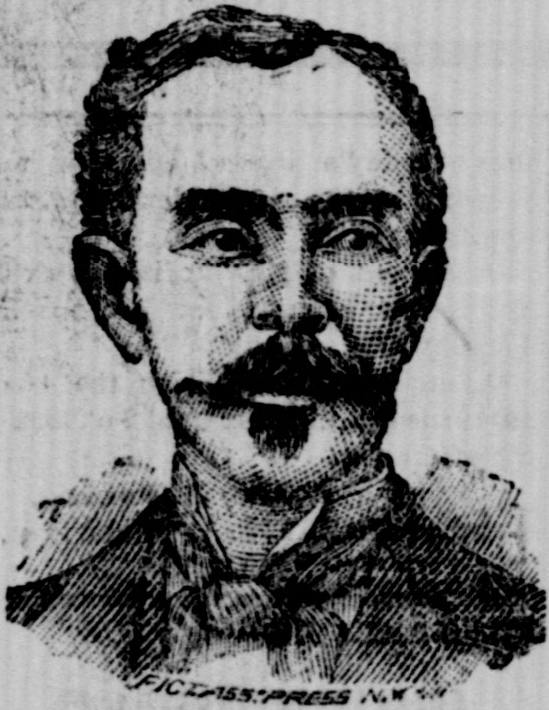

United States Ambassador to Liberia
- In office January 11, 1892 – May 14, 1893
- President: Benjamin Harrison
- Preceded by: Alexander Clark
- Succeeded by: William H. Heard

Personal details
- Born: November 17, 1853
- Died: May 14, 1893 (aged 39)
- Resting place: Crown Hill Cemetery and Arboretum, Section 31, Lot 322; 39.8184139°N 86.1697157°W

William D. McCoy (November 17, 1853 – May 14, 1893) was the United States Ambassador to Liberia from 1892 to 1893.

== Early life ==
McCoy was born on November 17, 1853. McCoy was of African ancestry.

== Career ==
McCoy was appointed by President Benjamin Harrison to the position of United States Ambassador to Liberia on January 11, 1892. The presentation of his credentials occurred on March 28, 1892. He remained in this position until his death.

== Personal life ==
McCoy resided in Indiana.

== Death ==
McCoy died at post on May 14, 1893, at the age of thirty-nine. His remains are interred at Crown Hill Cemetery in Indianapolis, Section 31, Lot 322, 39.8184139°N 86.1697157°W.
