= Greensfork Township, Randolph County, Indiana =

Greensfork Township
- Township
- Coordinates: 40°03′29″N 84°52′01″W
- Country: United States
- State: Indiana
- County: Randolph

Government
  - Type: Indiana township

Area
  - Total: 46.09 sq mi (119.4 km^{2})
  - Land: 46.04 sq mi (119.2 km^{2})
  - Water: 0.05 sq mi (0.13 km^{2})
- Elevation: 1,201 ft (366 m)

Population (2020)
  - Total: 1,083
  - Density: 23.52/sq mi (9.082/km^{2})
- Time zone: UTC-5 (Eastern (EST))
  - Summer (DST): UTC-4 (EDT)
- Area code: 765
- FIPS code: 18-29736
- GNIS feature ID: 453354

Greensfork Township is one of eleven townships in Randolph County, Indiana. As of the 2020 census, its population was 1,083 (slightly up from 1,082 at 2010) and it contained 448 housing units.

== History ==
Greensfork Township was organized in 1818. It was the site of the Greenville Settlement, one of three communities developed by free people of color who settled here by the mid-nineteenth century. Their children were among those who attended the Union Literary Institute, founded in the township by Quakers and free people of color after the state prohibited 'colored children' from attending public schools.

== Geography ==
According to the 2010 census, the township has a total area of 46.09 square miles (119.4 km^{2}), of which 46.04 square miles (119.2 km^{2}) (or 99.89%) is land and 0.05 square miles (0.13 km^{2}) (or 0.11%) is water.

=== Unincorporated towns ===
- Arba at 40.0108807°N 84.8669056°W
- Crete at 40.0433805°N 84.8616282°W
- Spartanburg at 40.0661582°N 84.8516283°W

(This list is based on USGS data and may include former settlements.)
