= Amanda Way =

Pioneer women's rights advocate for Indiana

Amanda M. Way
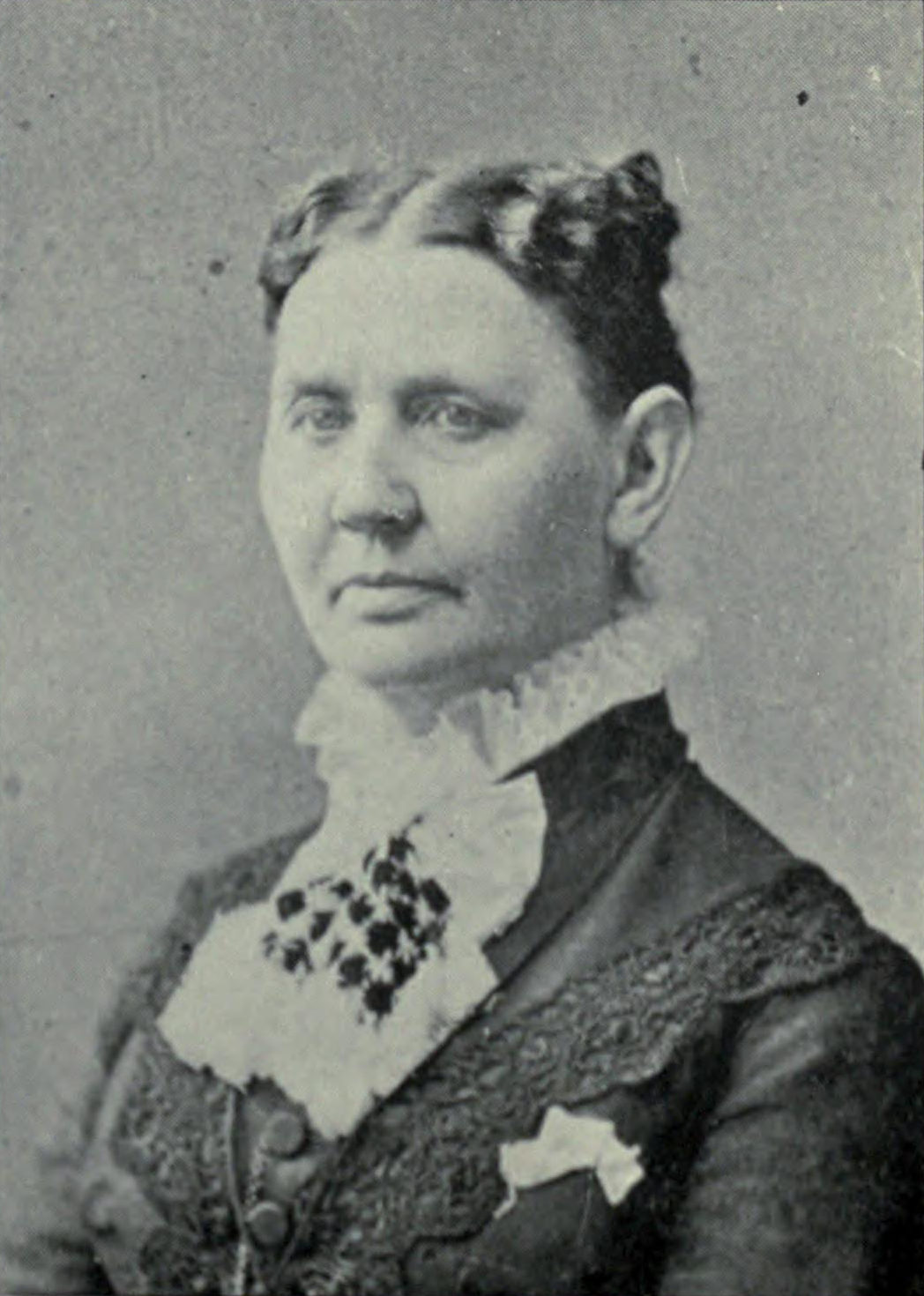
- Born: July 10, 1828; Winchester, Randolph County, IN
- Died: 1914 (aged 85–86); Whittier, California
- Movement: Temperance, Women's Suffrage, Abolition

Amanda M. Way (July 10, 1828 – February 24, 1914) was a pioneer in the temperance and women's equal rights movements, an American Civil War nurse, a minister in the Methodist Episcopal Church in the 1870s, and a Society of Friends (Quaker) minister by the mid-1880s. Way, a founding member of the Indiana Woman's Rights Association, called for the state's first women's rights convention in 1851 and served as vice president of the proceedings. Way remained active in the Association, including service as its president in 1855, and helped reactivate it in 1869, renamed as the Indiana Woman's Suffrage Association. Elizabeth Cady Stanton and Susan B. Anthony dubbed her the "mother of 'The Woman Suffrage Association' in Indiana" for her early leadership and efforts in initiating the first women's rights convention in the state.

== Early life and education ==
Amanda M. Way was born on July 10, 1828, in Winchester in Randolph County, Indiana, to Hannah (Martin) and Matthew Way. She was the second of the family's eight and the oldest daughter. Her father's Quaker family had migrated to Randolph County, Indiana, in 1817 from either North or South Carolina. Way attended local schools, including Union Literary Institute (a Quaker-supported school in Randolph County), and was trained as a teacher.

A local cholera epidemic took the life of her fiancé, a Dr. Cook, in 1849, three weeks prior to their marriage. Way never married.

== Career ==
=== Early career ===
Way was a schoolteacher by profession, but after the death of her father in 1849, she worked as a milliner (hatmaker) and seamstress to support her widowed mother and other members of her family. After her older brother's marriage, Way became head of the household and its sole breadwinner.

=== Temperance advocate ===
Way began her reform work as an activist in the local temperance movement, and in 1844 joined the Winchester Total Abstinence Society. In 1854 she led a group of Winchester women in what is known as the "whiskey riots" or the "Page Liquor Case." Way and around 40 to 50 other women armed with hatchets and hammers entered several local saloons and drugstores in Winchester to persuade the owners to sign a pledge and agree to stop selling liquor. If the proprietors refused to sign, the women emptied the establishment's barrels of whiskey along with other wine and spirits into the streets and damaged other property. The women were found not guilty of criminal charges. Way was not included in a civil lawsuit that William Page, the plaintiff and one of the store owners, filed against some of the other women, as well as their husbands. The jury in the civil suit awarded Page $140 in damages.

Way later became a lecturer and organizer of the Independent Order of Good Templars, a temperance group, and was the first women elected as Grand Worthy Chief Templar.

=== Women's rights activist ===
In January 1851, when Way attended a Society of Friends meeting in Greensboro, Henry County, Indiana, she proposed that a women's rights convention be held in Indiana. Way, along with Joel Davis and Lydia Davis were appointed to organize it. Way's initial involvement in women's rights was not for the goal of obtaining the vote, but rather to "correct injustices." Way's call for equality of the sexes was also a result of her faith; the Society of Friends (Quakers) believed that "everyone should have an equal opportunity."

During the first Indiana women's rIghts convention, which was held October 14–15, 1851, in Dublin, Indiana, in Wayne County, Indiana, Way served as vice-president of the proceedings. She also delivered the convention's opening address, declaring that "unless women demand their rights politically, socially, and financially, they will continue in the future as [they have] in the past. . .” The convention led to the formal establishment in October 1852 of the Woman's Rights Association of Indiana, a state organization that supported equality for women and began agitating for women's suffrage, with Way serving as its treasurer and one of the thirty-two signers of its constitution. Way remained active in the Indiana Women's RIghts Association in the 1850s and became president of the association in 1855. As early as 1857 she proposed a resolution to petition the state legislature for women's suffrage in Indiana.

=== Civil War nurse ===
When the suffrage movement's activities were interrupted due to the American Civil War, Way took a break from her temperance activities and work with the Indiana Women's Rights Association to join the Indiana Sanitary Commission, while four of her brothers served in the Union Army. In 1861 Way served as a battlefield and hospital nurse, which earned her a government pension in 1897 for her service during the war.

=== Social reformer and minister ===
In 1869 Way helped revive the Indiana Women's Rights Association, which became an affiliate of the American Woman Suffrage Association, and changed its name to the Indiana Woman's Suffrage Association. As a representative of the IWSA, Way read a memorial on behalf of the organization before the Indiana General Assembly in 1871 in support of an amendment to the state constitution that would grant women the right to vote. The American Woman Suffrage Association merged with the National Woman Suffrage Association to become the National American Woman Suffrage Association in 1890, and the Indiana Woman's Suffrage Association became a chapter of the combined organizations.

Way also served as a delegate to the National Temperance Convention in 1869 in Chicago that led to the organization of the Temperance party, which later changed its name to the Prohibition Party.

In 1871 Way became a licensed minister of the Methodist Episcopal Church and moved in 1872 to Kansas, where she continued to remain active in the temperance and women's suffrage movements. Way was a founder and first president of the Women's Christian Temperance Union in Kansas. Later that year, after the Methodist Episcopal Church barred women from the ministry, Way renewed her membership in the Society of Friends (Quakers) and served as a Friends minister for the remainder of her life.

== Later years ==
Way moved to the western United States in the late nineteenth century. In the 1890s, when she briefly resided in Idaho, a state where women had the right to vote, Way organized a Friends Church in Boise. In 1900, at the age of seventy-two, Idaho's Prohibition Party nominated Way as its candidate for the U.S. Congress. The nomination made her the first Indiana-born woman to run for a congressional seat, but she was note elected. Way spent her final years in California.

== Death and legacy ==
Way died on February 24, 1914, in Whittier, California. her remains are buried in Whittier Cemetery.

Way's contributions are not well known in the present-day; however, she was remembered for her efforts on behalf of the temperance and women's suffrage movements during her lifetime. Elizabeth Cady Stanton and Susan B. Anthony included a brief biography of Way in History of Woman Suffrage (vol. I, 1889), calling her the "mother of 'The Woman Suffrage Association' in Indiana." Other sources on the woman's suffrage movement describe some of the details of her early leadership in Indiana's women's rights movement and as a founding member of the Indiana Woman's Rights Association, later renamed the Indiana Women's Suffrage Association. Way is best known for her work as a "pioneer" in the women's rights movement in Indiana, whose efforts "laid the groundwork for women's suffrage."

== Honors and tributes ==
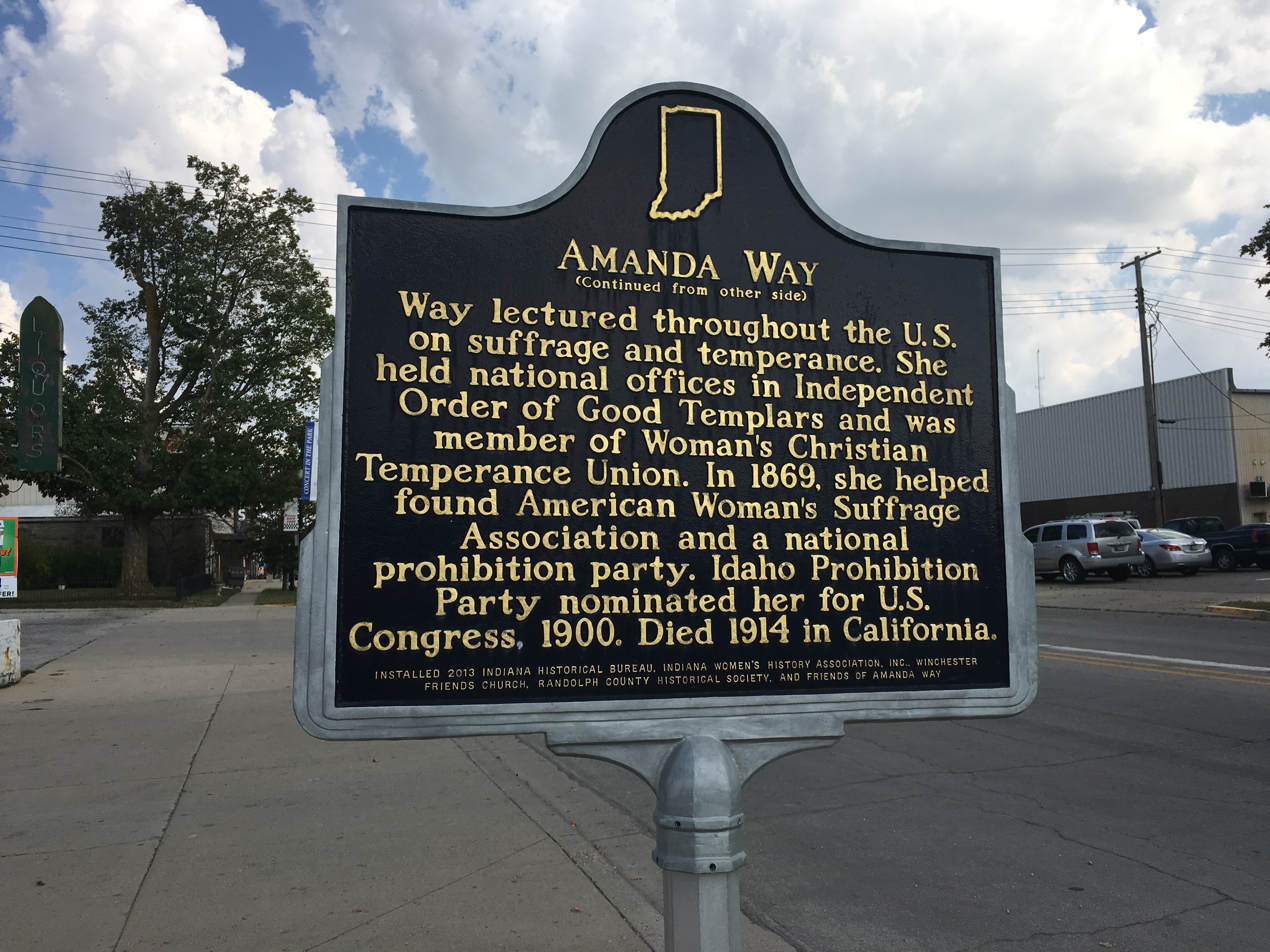
Amanda Way marker

In 2013 a state historical marker was installed in her honor in Winchester, Indiana.
