= Christine A. Elder =

American diplomat

Christine Elder
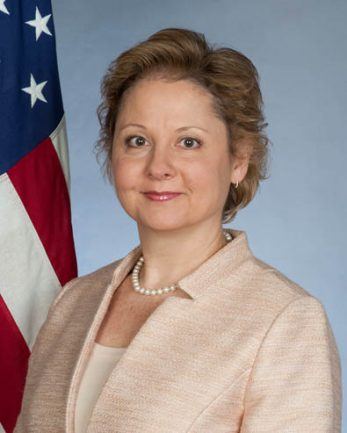

United States Ambassador to Liberia
- In office June 23, 2016 – March 21, 2020
- President: Barack Obama; Donald Trump
- Preceded by: Mark Boulware (acting)
- Succeeded by: Michael A. McCarthy

Personal details
- Born: Chicago, Illinois, U.S.
- Education: University of Kentucky; George Washington University

Christine Ann Elder is an American diplomat who served as the United States ambassador to Liberia from June 2016 to March 2020.

== Early life and education ==
Elder is a native of Glasgow, Kentucky, the daughter of Allen and Diane Elder. She is a graduate of Glasgow High School and received a B.A. from the University of Kentucky and an M.A. from The George Washington University.

== Career ==
Elder's career has spanned both civil and foreign service. She served as a Trade Policy Assistant with the International Trade Administration at the United States Department of Commerce before joining the United States Department of State. Her early assignments included ones in Germany and Hungary. She served as Senior Watch Officer in the State Department's Operations Center from 2005 to 2006, and as deputy director for Regional Affairs in the Bureau of Near Eastern Affairs from 2006 to 2007. Between 2007 and 2010, she held roles as Strategic Planning Officer in the Bureau of International Programs and Acting Deputy Coordinator for International Information Programs.

Elder served as Deputy Chief of Mission at the U.S. Embassy in Maputo, Mozambique from 2010 to 2013.

When Elder was tapped by President Obama to become ambassador, she was the Director of the Office of Southern African Affairs at the Bureau of African Affairs at the U.S. Department of State, a position she had held since 2013.

== Ambassador to Liberia ==
Elder was nominated by President Barack Obama on February 12, 2016, and was confirmed by the Senate on May 17, 2016. She was sworn in on June 20, 2016 and she presented her credentials to President Ellen Johnson Sirleaf on June 23, 2016. She left her post on March 21, 2020.

== US Consul General to New South Wales and Queensland ==
In March 2022, Christine Elder assumed the role of U.S. Consul General to New South Wales and Queensland. A key accomplishment during her tenure was the establishment of the U.S. Consulate in North Sydney.

Under her supervision, the U.S. Consular offices in North Sydney were successfully opened, expanding services to the public and providing a more accessible platform for fostering stronger ties between Australia and the United States."

== Personal ==
Elder is married to Paul Hughes, a former Foreign Service Officer, and has two step-children.

Diplomatic posts
Preceded by Mark Boulware; Acting	United States Ambassador to Liberia; 2016–2020	Succeeded by Michael A. McCarthy
