= C. H. J. Taylor =

American journalist and diplomat

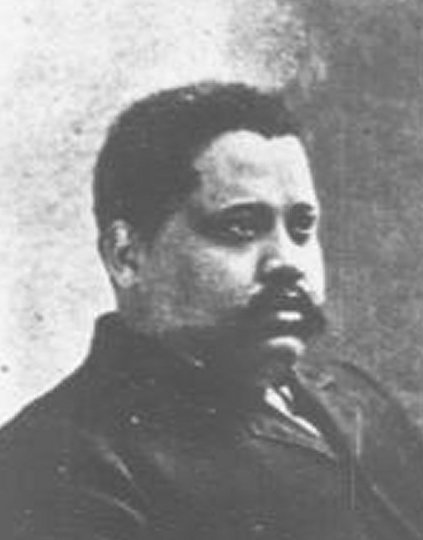

United States Minister to Liberia
- In office March 11, 1887 – September 22, 1887
- President: Grover Cleveland
- Preceded by: Moses A. Hopkins
- Succeeded by: Ezekiel E. Smith

Personal details
- Born: 1857 Marion, Alabama, U.S.
- Died: 1899 (aged 41–42)
- Party: Democratic

Charles Henry James Taylor (1857–1899), was an African-American journalist, editor, lawyer, orator, and political organizer. An early supporter of Democratic President Grover Cleveland, he was appointed Minister to Liberia during Cleveland's first presidential term.

During Cleveland's second term, Taylor was the first African American ever nominated for a diplomatic appointment to a predominantly white country, Bolivia, although he was not confirmed by the Senate. He was subsequently appointed Recorder of Deeds for the District of Columbia, a position he held until the early McKinley administration. After leaving Washington, Taylor edited an Atlanta newspaper, The Southern Appeal, and served as dean of the Law Department at Morris Brown College.

== Early life ==
Taylor was born into slavery on a plantation near Marion, Alabama, possibly in 1856, although sources differ on the exact year of his birth, as well as other details of his life. After the Civil War, he moved with his family to Savannah, Georgia, where he was educated at Beach Institute, a school operated by the American Missionary Association.

Taylor may have attended Oberlin College in Ohio and studied law at the University of Michigan. He claimed to have graduated from the latter institution, although no records confirm this. He was admitted to the bar in Marion County, Indiana, in 1882, and served as a deputy district attorney in Indiana’s Nineteenth Judicial District.

In 1883, while teaching school in Palmyra, Missouri, Taylor met and married Julia Shropshire. The following year, he moved to Kansas, where he began his career as an orator and political organizer.

== First Cleveland administration ==
Although Taylor, like most African Americans at the time, initially supported Republican candidates and campaigned for Kansas Republican gubernatorial candidate John Martin in 1884, he was disappointed at the lack of patronage positions Republicans offered to blacks. In 1884, he began publishing a newspaper "in the interests of democracy,” and in 1886, he ran for local office in Wyandotte County as an independent.

In 1887, President Cleveland appointed Taylor as the U.S. Minister to Liberia. He stayed in Liberia for only five months, claiming he had returned to campaign for Cleveland’s re-election, although he later made statements strongly critical of Liberian politics and the emigration schemes of the American Colonization Society.

In the run-up to the 1888 presidential election, Taylor participated in founding the National Negro Democratic League at a meeting in Saint Louis, together with Herbert A. Clark and J. Milton Turner. According to Bruce Mouser, the primary purpose of the League was to prepare lists of African American candidates for “high-level patronage positions” in the event of a Democratic administration. In the same year, Taylor gave speeches at the Kansas and Missouri state Democratic conventions and was elected as an alternate in the Kansas delegation to the national Democratic convention in St. Louis, “the first and only Negro ever sent to a Democratic National convention,” according to one contemporary account. Taylor campaigned for Cleveland’s re-election in several swing states, including Iowa, Indiana, Missouri, and New York.

== Cleveland interregnum ==
After Cleveland’s defeat, Taylor settled in Atlanta, where he built up a large legal practice. A contemporary newspaper account described him as the first black lawyer in the history of Atlanta to appear in city court as an attorney. In 1889, he published a lengthy pamphlet, Whites and Blacks, or The Question Settled, which criticized the loyalty of African Americans to the Republican Party and argued that blacks in the South would only achieve civil liberty by cultivating better relations with white southerners: “The Southern white men,” Taylor wrote, “will give the Negro all he merits.”

In the following year, however, Taylor returned to Kansas, perhaps due to the deteriorating racial climate in Georgia as well as the changing political scene in Kansas with the rise of the Populist Party. He became editor of a black newspaper in Kansas City, Kansas, The American Citizen, and ran unsuccessfully for a seat in the Kansas legislature on the “fusion” Democratic-Populist ticket in the 1890 election. As the 1892 presidential election approached, Taylor spoke frequently in Kansas, Missouri, Iowa, and neighboring states against prohibition, the so-called “McKinley tariff,” and in support of Democratic candidates. He became head of the National Negro Democratic League in 1892, giving him considerable national influence over the awarding of patronage positions to African Americans following the Cleveland victory.

== Second Cleveland administration ==
Cleveland nominated Taylor as Minister to Bolivia in September 1893. After almost five months of delay, the Senate refused to confirm the nomination, claiming the Bolivians would not accept a black representative. Cleveland then nominated Taylor to be Recorder of Deeds for the District of Columbia, which was also a highly controversial nomination since District Democrats wished for one of their own to have the position. Taylor’s nomination was ultimately confirmed by the Senate, owing partly to the intervention of the venerable Frederick Douglass, who had previously been Recorder.

Throughout his tenure as Recorder, Taylor continued to face intense criticism. The Civil Service Commission, among whose members was Theodore Roosevelt, found him guilty of unfair campaign levies on African American civil servants and recommended his dismissal to President Cleveland. He was also accused by the editor of the Washington Bee, Calvin Chase, of immoral relationships with women. Taylor successfully sued Chase for libel, resulting in a jail term for Chase. Cleveland did not act on the Commission's recommendation, and Taylor continued as Recorder of Deeds through the rest of the Democratic administration.

== Post-Cleveland life ==
Following the Democratic defeat in 1896, Taylor practiced law for a time in Baltimore before becoming dean of the Law department at Morris Brown College in Atlanta. He continued to practice law, give speeches, and edit a newspaper, the Southern Appeal, until his health went into decline. He died on May 25, 1899 and was interred in Baltimore.

Taylor’s personal relationship with Grover Cleveland became the subject of controversy in 1904 when a Republican congressman from Kansas, attempting to counter Democratic criticisms of Theodore Roosevelt for dining with Booker T. Washington, claimed that Cleveland had dined with Taylor. Weeks of claims and counter-claims followed, including a letter from Cleveland himself denying he had ever lunched with Taylor. There was suspicion that Cleveland was thinking of running for a third presidential term and wanted to curry favor with white southerners, for many of whom "social equality" between blacks and whites was a taboo.

As late as 1936, a white Democratic politician from Kansas City, Joseph B. Shannon, on the occasion of the dedication of a series of portraits of District of Columbia Recorders of Deeds, praised Taylor for his “courage and convictions”: “It took courage for a colored man to take the stand that Taylor took at that time,” Shannon said. “And I want to say here that he had that courage, coupled with an intelligence and independence of thought that in my opinion links his name with such men of his race as Booker Washington, Paul Dunbar, Paul Robeson, Countee Cullen and others whose names have brought honor to the Negro race of the country.”
