= Crete, Indiana =

- Unincorporated community
- Location within Indiana Location within the United States
- Coordinates: 40°02′36″N 84°51′42″W
- Country: United States
- State: Indiana
- County: Randolph
- Township: Greensfork
- Elevation: 1,188 ft (362 m)
- Time zone: UTC-5 (Eastern (EST))
  - Summer (DST): UTC-4 (EDT)
- ZIP code: 47355
- Area code: 765
- FIPS code: 18-15904
- GNIS feature ID: 433126

Crete is an unincorporated community in Greensfork Township, Randolph County, in the U.S. state of Indiana.

== History ==
A post office was established at Crete in 1882, and remained in operation until it was discontinued in 1918. The community may have been named after the pet name of Lucretia, a local young woman.

== Geography ==
Crete is located about 3 miles (5 km) east of the town of Lynn.

== Notable person ==
Jim Jones, leader of the Peoples Temple cult, was born in Crete in 1931.
