= Charles Edward Rhetts =

American diplomat

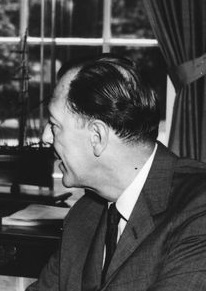

United States Ambassador to Liberia
- In office July 5, 1962 – September 30, 1964
- President: John F. Kennedy
- Preceded by: Elbert G. Mathews
- Succeeded by: Ben H. Brown Jr.

Personal details
- Born: May 21, 1910 Columbus, Indiana, U.S.
- Died: November 14, 1971 (aged 61) London, England
- Spouse: Ruth Fisher
- Children: 3
- Education: Dartmouth College; Harvard Law School

Charles Edward Rhetts (May 21, 1910 – November 14, 1971) was an American diplomat.

== Early life ==
Rhetts was born in Columbus, Indiana on May 21, 1910.

== Education ==
Rhetts graduated from Dartmouth College and Harvard Law School.

== Career ==
In 1934, after graduating, he worked in Washington D.C., with New Deal agencies. In 1945, Rhetts served as acting assistant Attorney General. Rhetts also practiced private law in Washington D.C., where he represented John S. Service.

== Diplomatic career ==
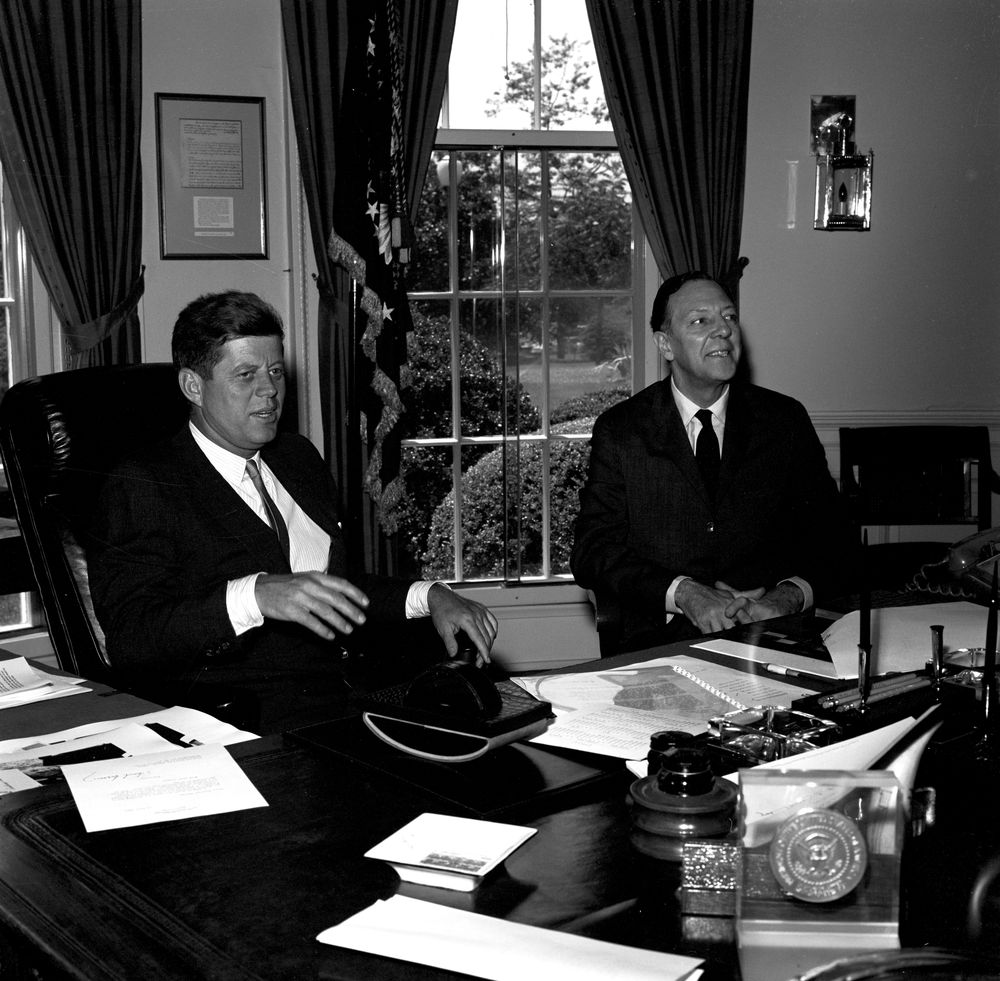
President John F. Kennedy with US Ambassador to Liberia, Charles Edward Rhetts

Rhetts was appointed by President John F. Kennedy to the position of United States Ambassador to Liberia on July 5, 1962. The presentation of his credentials occurred on August 7, 1962. He remained in this position until September 30, 1964.

== Personal life ==
Rhetts was married to Ruth Fisher. Together they had three children.

== Death ==
On November 14, 1971, Rhetts died during a vacation in London, England of a heart attack.
