= Michael A. McCarthy =

American diplomat

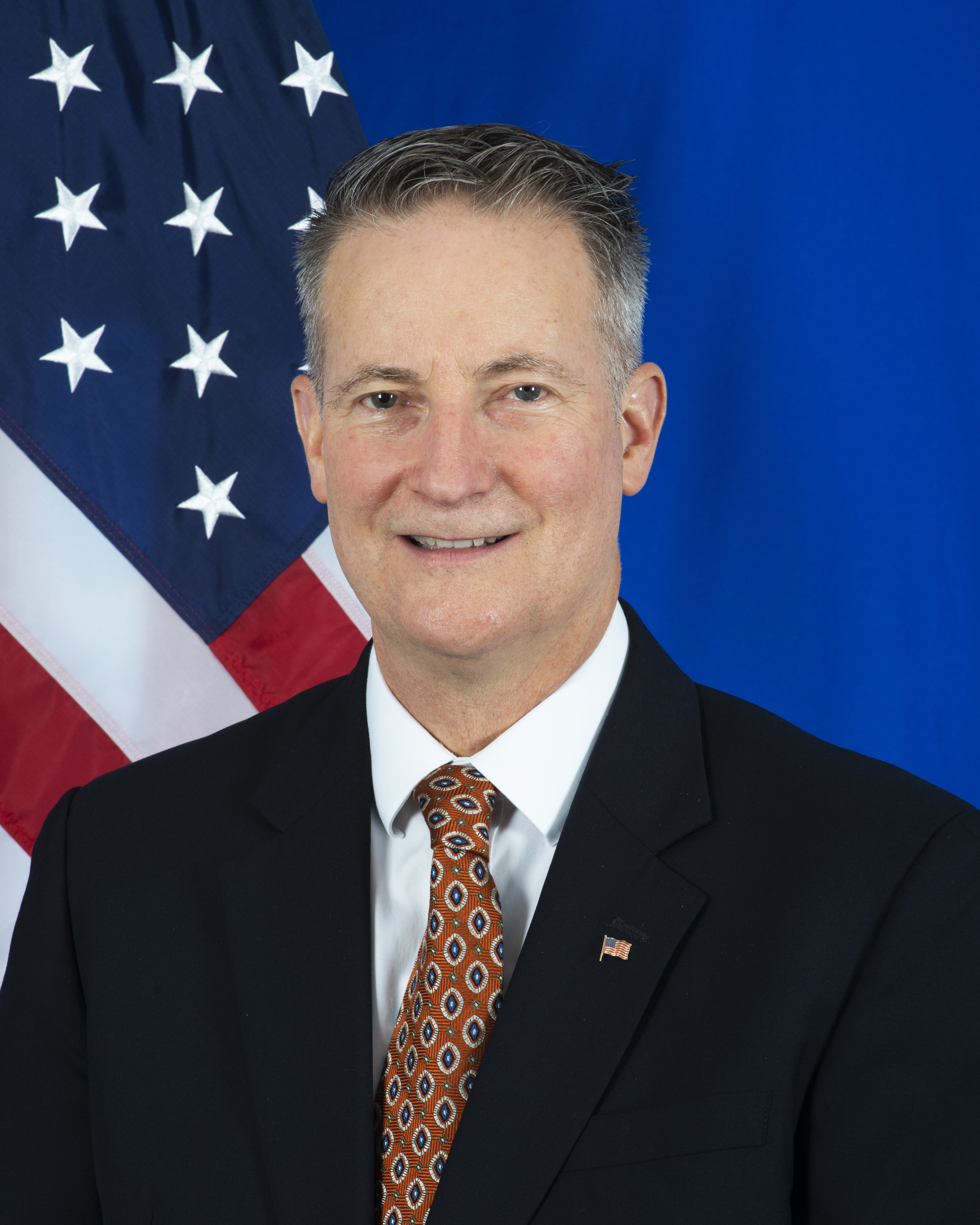

United States Ambassador to Liberia
- In office January 22, 2021 – July 12, 2023
- Nominated by: Donald Trump
- Appointed by: Joe Biden
- Preceded by: Christine A. Elder
- Succeeded by: Mark Toner

Personal details
- Education: Tulane University (BS)

Michael Allen McCarthy is an American diplomat who had served as the United States Ambassador to Liberia from January 22, 2021 to July 12, 2023.

== Early life and education ==
McCarthy received his Bachelor of Science from Tulane University. Before joining the Foreign Service he was Vice President of Marketing for Compro Systems, Inc., in Baltimore, Maryland.

== Career ==
McCarthy joined the Foreign Service in 1990. He is a career member of the United States Foreign Service, Class of Minister-Counselor. He was the Area Management Officer of the East Africa Division of the State Department's Office of Overseas Buildings and Operations, and a Country Desk Officer in the Office of West African Affairs in the Bureau of African Affairs. From 2010 to 2013, he served as the Management Officer at the United States Consulate General in Frankfurt, Germany, serving from 2007 to 2010 as a Management Officer at the United States Embassy in New Delhi, India and he served in the United States Embassy in Asmara, Eritrea from 2004 to 2007. From 2015 to 2017, he was Office Director for the Office of Retirement in the Bureau of Human Resources at the State Department. From 2013 to 2015, he served as the Deputy Chief of Mission for Embassy Juba in South Sudan. Other postings were in Uruguay, Sri Lanka and Thailand Prior to his ambassadorial appointment, he was Consul General of the United States Consulate General in Johannesburg, South Africa.

== Ambassador to Liberia ==
On May 27, 2020, President Donald Trump announced his intent to nominate McCarthy to be the next United States Ambassador to Liberia. On June 2, 2020, his nomination was sent to the Senate. On November 18, 2020, his nomination was confirmed in the United States Senate by voice vote. On January 6, 2021, McCarthy arrived in Liberia. He presented his credentials to President George Weah on January 22, 2021.

== Personal life ==
McCarthy speaks French, Spanish, and Thai.

== See also ==
- Ambassadors of the United States

Diplomatic posts
Preceded by Christine A. Elder	United States Ambassador to Liberia; 2021–2023	Succeeded by Mark Toner
