= Joseph L. Johnson =

American diplomat

United States Ambassador to Liberia
- In office August 27, 1918 – February 13, 1922
- President: Woodrow Wilson
- Preceded by: James L. Curtis
- Succeeded by: Solomon Porter Hood

Personal details
- Born: February 14, 1874 Washington Township, Ohio
- Died: July 18, 1945 (aged 71) Columbus, Ohio

Joseph Lowery Johnson (February 14, 1874 – July 18, 1945) was a physician and an early African-American diplomat, serving as the United States Ambassador to Liberia from 1918 to 1922.

== Early life ==
Johnson was born on February 14, 1874, in Washington Township in Darke County, Ohio and attended the Union Literary Institute and resided in what is known as the Greenville Settlement or Longtown, a settlement of mostly mixed-race African Americans that dated to the 1820s. His parents were Walter Johnson and Lucinda Jane McCown. His sister was Kathryn Magnolia Johnson, later an important civil rights activist, teacher, and author.

He was a student at the non-segregated Union Literary Institute in neighboring Randolph County, Indiana and taught in schools in Darke County. He attended Ohio Northern University and then the Howard University College of Medicine for medical school, graduating with an M.D. in 1902. (He is not related to the Joseph L. Johnson who would later be dean of the Howard University College of Medicine.) He returned to Ohio and then opened his practice, first in Rendville, Ohio, then after 1914 in Columbus. While in Rendville, he served on the community's board of education.

During this period, Johnson also spent several years as a special examiner for the United States Pension Bureau.

== Diplomatic career ==
Johnson was appointed by President Woodrow Wilson to the position of United States Ambassador to Liberia on August 27, 1918. The presentation of his credentials occurred on October 8, 1919. He remained in this position until February 13, 1922.

Since the Civil War, United States presidents had frequently appointed African Americans as ambassadors to Liberia and Haiti. Wilson, in his efforts to resegregate the federal government, ended that tradition with Haiti but maintained it with Liberia, making Johnson one of his very few Black high-ranking appointees.

As the American representative in Liberia at the end of World War I, Johnson was active in promoting Liberia's becoming a signatory of the Treaty of Versailles and its membership in the League of Nations. While he was in Liberia, his sister Kathryn Magnolia Johnson was investigating treatment of Black American soldiers on the front lines in France, the result of which would be her co-authored book Two Colored Women with the American Expeditionary Forces.

== Later life ==
After his ambassadorship, Johnson lived in Washington, D.C. for several years before returning to Ohio. He was active in Democratic politics, particularly in the 1932 election of Franklin D. Roosevelt. In 1928, he was elected president of the Al Smith League of Colored Voters of Ohio, which promoted the Democratic nominee. He also served for several years as president of the board of trustees of Wilberforce University, the historically Black college in Wilberforce, Ohio.

He eventually returned to his medical practice in Columbus, where he died in 1945 of a heart attack, still practicing at age 71.
