= Moses A. Hopkins =

American diplomat

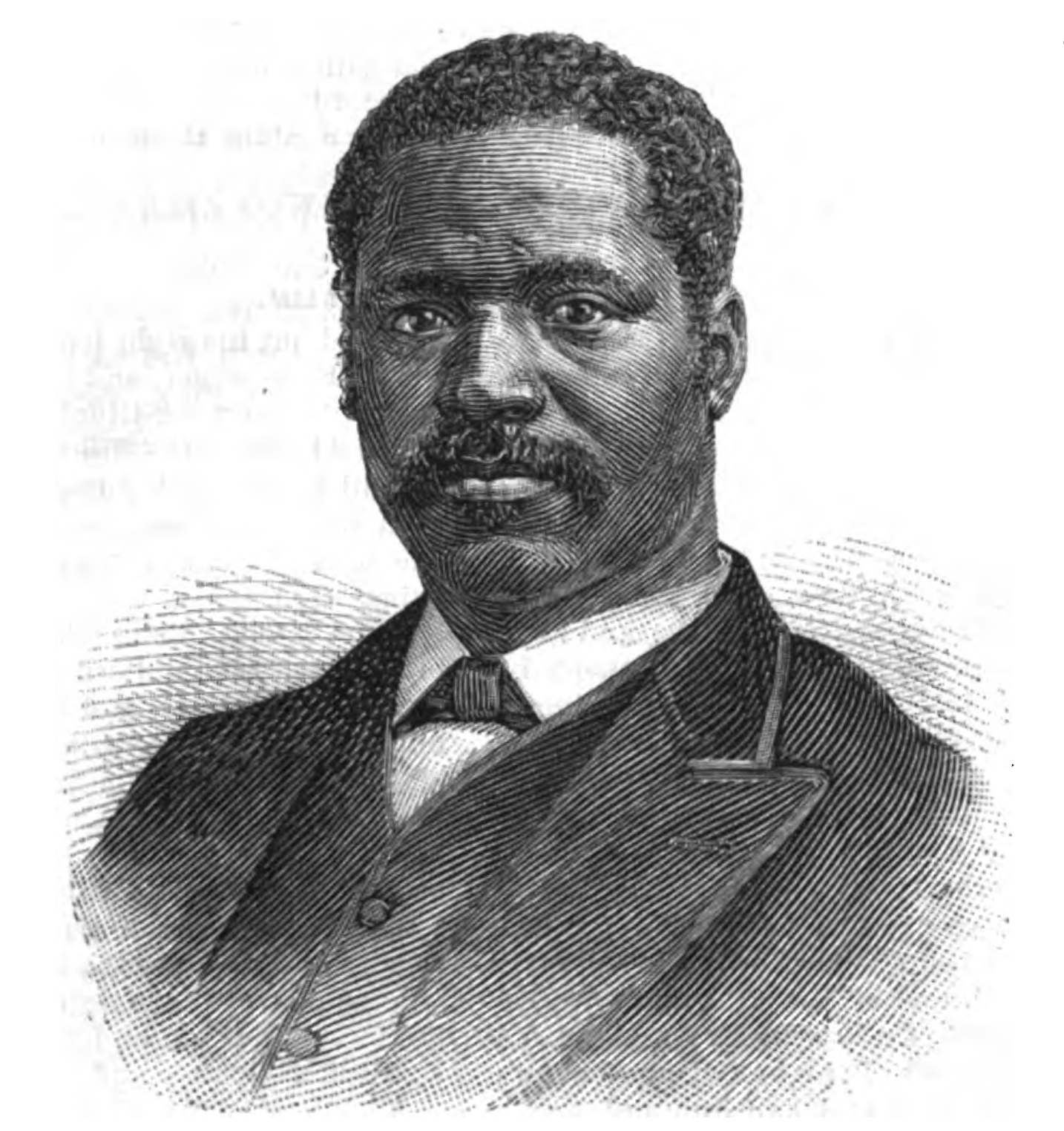
- Hopkins in Frank Leslie's Sunday Magazine (1885)

United States Minister to Liberia
- In office September 11, 1885 – August 7, 1886
- President: Grover Cleveland
- Preceded by: John H. Smythe
- Succeeded by: Charles H. J. Taylor

Personal details
- Born: December 25, 1846 Montgomery County, Virginia, U.S.
- Died: August 7, 1886 (aged 39) Liberia
- Party: Democratic Party
- Education: Auburn Theological Seminary
- Occupation: Clergyman, educator, diplomat

Moses Aaron Hopkins (December 25, 1846 – August 7, 1886) was an American clergyman and educator who served as United States minister (ambassador) to Liberia in 1885–1886. He was the first formerly enslaved person to serve the United States in that capacity. He died while in Liberia.

Hopkins, born enslaved in Montgomery County, Virginia, was moved near Newbern in 1850, and escaped to serve in Union camps as a cook. He then briefly worked aboard steamships traversing the Ohio and Mississippi rivers. After attending Avery College and graduating from Lincoln University as valedictorian in 1874, in 1877 he was the first black graduate of Auburn Theological Seminary in New York. His graduating address "The Problem of Race Reconciliation in the South" was made all the more remarkable by the fact that ten years previously he could neither read nor write. He settled in Franklinton, North Carolina on June 14, 1877, where he established a church and a school. The school, known as Albion Academy, was among two dozen funded by the Presbyterian Board of Missions for Freedmen to educate formerly enslaved persons. With his wife Carrie, he also founded the short-lived Freedmen’s Friend newspaper, bearing the masthead "The Organ of Albion Academy and Our Race". Hopkins was first appointed minister to Liberia by President Grover Cleveland through a recess appointment and was later confirmed by the U.S. Senate. He was appointed on September 11, 1885, departed October 21, and presented his credentials on December 14, 1885. On August 7, 1886, he died of what was then known as “African fever”, sharing his fate with three other U.S. ministers to Liberia who died of tropical diseases between the years 1882 and 1893. He was remembered at the time in the Indianapolis Journal as "an earnest laborer for the elevation of his race and the redemption of Africa." Congress enacted an allowance of $2,500 to his widow, representing six months salary.

On April 30, 2021, Hopkins was one of 71 "forgotten" names commemorated by the American Foreign Service Association as an on-duty death while in the foreign service.

Government offices
| Preceded by John H. Smythe | United States Minister to Liberia; September 11, 1885 – August 3, 1886 | Succeeded by Charles H. J. Taylor |
