= Solomon Porter Hood =

American diplomat

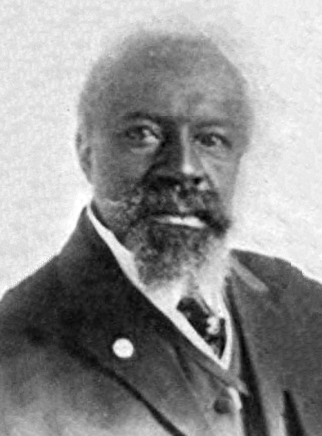

United States Ambassador to Liberia
- In office October 26, 1921 – January 9, 1926
- President: Warren G. Harding; Calvin Coolidge
- Preceded by: Joseph L. Johnson
- Succeeded by: William T. Francis

United States Consul General to Monrovia
- In office 1922–1924

Personal details
- Born: July 30, 1853 Lancaster, Pennsylvania, US
- Died: 1943 (aged 89-90) Atlantic Highlands, New Jersey, US
- Party: Republican
- Spouse: Mary Anna Davis

Solomon Porter Hood (July 30, 1853 – 1943) the United States Minister to Liberia from 1921 to 1926.

== Early life ==
Hood was born on July 30, 1853, in Lancaster, Pennsylvania.

== Diplomatic career ==
Hood was appointed by President Warren G. Harding to the position of United States Minister to Liberia on October 26, 1921. The presentation of his credentials occurred on February 13, 1922. He remained in this position until January 9, 1926. Hood also served as the United States Consul General to Monrovia from 1922 to 1924.

== Personal life ==
Hood married Mary Anna Davis in 1884. Hood was a member of the African Methodist Episcopal Church. Hood was a member of the Odd Fellows and the Elks.

== Death ==
Hood died in 1943 in Atlantic Highlands, New Jersey. Hood was interred at the Crystal Stream Cemetery in Locust, New Jersey.
