= Charles Edward Mitchell =

American diplomat, banker (1870–1937)

Charles Edward Mitchell (May 30, 1870 – March 29, 1937) was an American bank president and diplomat. He was a Republican, and was appointed by U.S. president Herbert Hoover to a consular position in Liberia. He had lived in Institute, West Virginia and Manhattan, New York.

== Biography ==
Mitchell was born in St. Michaels, Maryland. He served as business manager for West Virginia State College from 1904 to 1931. He was the president of Mutual Savings and Loan Company of Charleston, West Virginia from 1920 to 1931. He was a member of the West Virginia Republican State Committee from 1921 to 1929.

He served as U.S. Minister to Liberia from 1930 to 1933. He was U.S. Consul General in Monrovia, Liberia as of 1932. He served on the New York Republican State Committee in 1937. He died of an embolism which developed after surgery at Harlem Hospital in New York City.

He was in a dispute with Edwin Barclay, the unrecognized president of Liberia, after referring to him as Mr. in a request for repayment of a loan to the financial arm of Firestone Tire & Rubber Co.

== See also ==
- List of ambassadors of the United States to Liberia
