= Careysburg, Liberia =

City in Montserrado County, Liberia

Careysburg
- City
- Location in Liberia
- Coordinates: 6°24′12″N 10°32′55″W
- Country: Liberia
- County: Montserrado County
- District: Careysburg
- Established: 1856
- Incorporated: 1923
- Elevation: 105 m (344 ft)
- Time zone: UTC+0 (GMT)

Careysburg is a city in Montserrado County, Liberia. It was founded in 1856, and is named in honor of Rev. Lott Cary, the first American Baptist missionary to Africa and a key figure in the founding of the Colony of Liberia. It is located 15 miles (24 km) northeast of Monrovia.

It was incorporated as a city in 1923 by an act of the Liberian legislature.

Rubber and coffee farming are the major economic activities in the area. It was also the site of a large Voice of America transmitter.

== History ==
About nine years after Liberia declared its independence on 1847, the Liberian legislature passed an Act authorizing Rev. John Seys, as an agent of the American Colonization Society to travel within the country for the purpose of locating an elevated region to establish a settlement to ensure better health conditions for Americo-Liberian settlers. It was further resolved by the Liberian legislature, per Section 12 of said Act: "That the settlement to be founded in the Queh Country shall be named Careysburg, in honor of the late Rev. Lott Carey, and that all other settlements shall be named according to the pleasure of the Legislature". The site that became Careysburg was selected for its abundance of fresh water, potential for agriculture, its cool temperature, absence of deadly mosquitoes, and scenic view. At the time, the people living in the surrounding area were of the Kpelle, Gola, and Queh ethnic groups, and Rev. Seys negotiated with local chiefs to purchase land.

In 1856, Careysburg was settled by North American freed slaves, mainly from the United States and Barbados. However, some Africans recaptured from ships at sea, destined for illicit sale as slaves in Europe and America, were also settled in Careysburg.
