= Josephine D. Heard =

American poet and teacher (1861–1924)

Josephine D. Henderson Heard
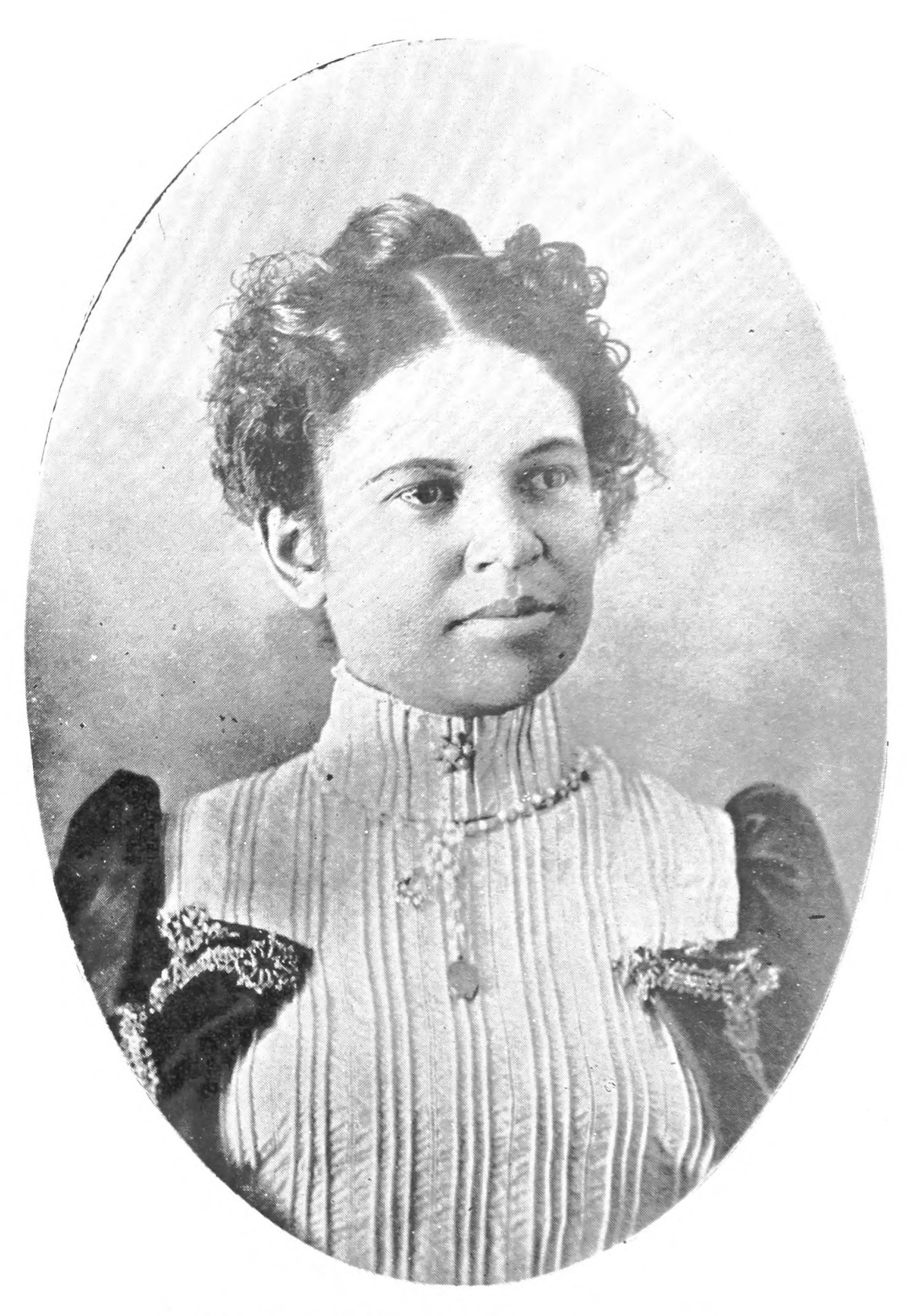
- Born: Josephine Delphine Henderson; October 11, 1861; Salisbury, North Carolina
- Died: 1924 (aged 62–63); Philadelphia, Pennsylvania
- Occupations: Poet, Educator
- Spouse: William Henry Heard (m. 1882)

Josephine Delphine Henderson Heard (October 11, 1861 – October 21, 1924) was an American poet and teacher.

== Biography ==
Josie Henderson was born October 11, 1861. She was the daughter of two enslaved parents, Lafayette and Annie Henderson in Salisbury, North Carolina. After slavery ended, a goal was set for her to become a teacher. She married William Henry Heard on January 21, 1882. She held teaching positions in many cities as she traveled with her husband, who was prominent in the AME Church. Her joy in teaching is reflected in the preface of her 1890 volume of poetry entitled Morning Glories. She wrote “from a heart that desires to encourage and inspire the youth of the Race.” The work contained seventy-two original poems by her. It was revised and expanded in 1891. Additional insight into her life is provided by her husband wrote in his memoir, “She is scholarly and poetic, and her use of the English language, as well as the criticism of my sermons, have done much in making me the preacher they say I am."

She died in Philadelphia, Pennsylvania, in 1924 of breast cancer.

Heard's poem "Black Sampson" as included in the anthology She Wields a Pen: American Women Poets of the Nineteenth Century edited by Janet Gray.
