= Arba, Indiana =

- Unincorporated community
- Location within Indiana Location within the United States
- Coordinates: 40°00′39″N 84°52′01″W
- Country: United States
- State: Indiana
- County: Randolph
- Township: Greensfork
- Elevation: 1,184 ft (361 m)
- Time zone: UTC-5 (Eastern (EST))
  - Summer (DST): UTC-4 (EDT)
- ZIP code: 47355
- Area code: 765
- GNIS feature ID: 430231

Arba is an unincorporated community in Greensfork Township, Randolph County, in the U.S. state of Indiana.

== History ==
Arba was settled by Quakers as early as 1815. A post office was established at Arba in 1849, and remained in operation until it was discontinued in 1911.
