= Mark Toner =

American diplomat (born 1964)

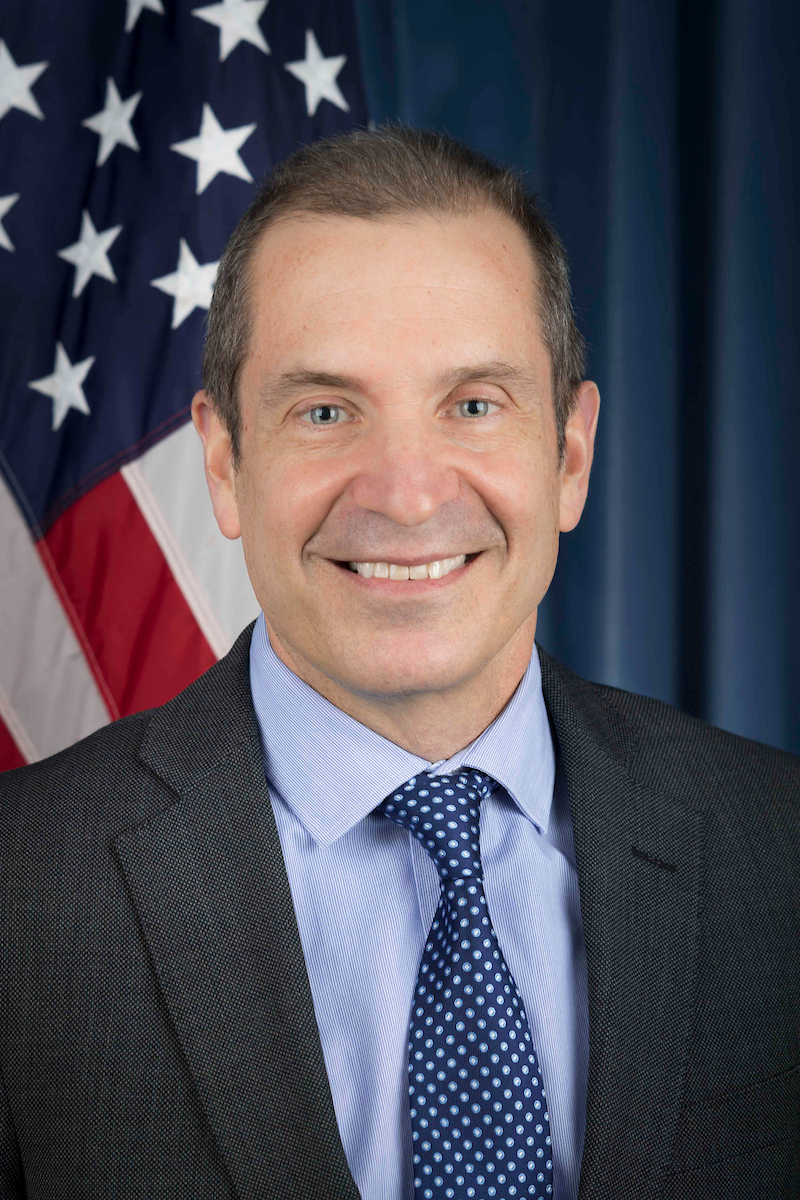
- Official portrait, 2021

United States Ambassador to Liberia
- In office August 7, 2024 – August 4, 2025
- President: Joe Biden; Donald Trump
- Preceded by: Michael A. McCarthy

26th Spokesperson for the United States Department of State
- In office January 20, 2017 – April 24, 2017
- President: Donald Trump
- Preceded by: John Kirby
- Succeeded by: Heather Nauert

Deputy Spokesperson for the United States Department of State
- In office June 1, 2015 – May 2017
- President: Barack Obama; Donald Trump
- Preceded by: Marie Harf
- In office May 2011 – June 2013; Acting: January 2010 – April 2011
- President: Barack Obama
- Preceded by: Robert A. Wood
- Succeeded by: Marie Harf

Personal details
- Born: 1964 (age 61–62) United States
- Education: University of Notre Dame; Industrial College of the Armed Forces

Mark Christopher Toner (born 1964) is a U.S. Foreign Service officer and former Spokesperson for the United States Department of State. He had served as the United States ambassador to Liberia.

== Early life and education ==
Toner was raised in Chadds Ford, Pennsylvania, graduating from the Salesianum School in nearby Wilmington, Delaware in 1982. He earned a B.A. degree from the University of Notre Dame in 1986 and later studied journalism at the University of California at Berkeley. Toner received a graduate degree from the National Defense University’s Industrial College of the Armed Forces. He was also a Peace Corps volunteer in Liberia.

== Career ==
As a career Foreign Service Officer, Toner served overseas in West Africa and Europe. Toner was the Information Officer in Dakar, Senegal, the Public Affairs Officer in Kraków, Poland, and the Spokesman for the U.S. Mission to NATO, in Brussels, Belgium. In Washington, Toner worked as a senior advisor for the Senate Foreign Relations Committee; as a Senior Watch Officer in the Department's Operations Center; and as the Director of the European Bureau’s Press and Public Outreach Division.

Toner currently holds the rank of Minister-Counselor.

=== State Department deputy spokesperson ===
Toner was deputy spokesperson for the State Department from 2010 to 2013, serving with Spokesperson Victoria Nuland. Toner became Deputy Spokesperson again on June 1, 2015. Following Rear Admiral John Kirby's departure as the Department's Chief Spokesperson on January 20, 2017, Toner became Acting Spokesperson. He announced the pass of the spokesperson baton to Heather Nauert on April 27, 2017.

=== U.S. ambassador to Liberia ===
On March 27, 2023, President Joe Biden nominated Toner to be the next ambassador to Liberia. He was confirmed by the Senate by voice vote on May 2, 2024. He arrived in Monrovia on August 2, 2024. Toner presented his credentials to Liberian President Joseph Boakai on August 7, 2024.

== Personal life ==
Toner speaks French and Polish.
