= Ben H. Brown Jr. =

American diplomat

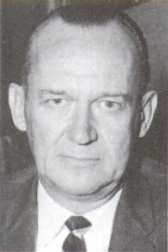

United States Ambassador to Liberia
- In office November 25, 1964 – July 17, 1969
- President: Lyndon B. Johnson
- Preceded by: Charles Edward Rhetts
- Succeeded by: Samuel Z. Westerfield Jr.

Personal details
- Born: February 8, 1914 Spartanburg, South Carolina
- Died: May 25, 1989 (aged 75) Georgetown University Hospital, Washington, D.C.

Military service
- Allegiance: United States
- Branch/service: United States Army
- Battles/wars: World War II

Ben Hill Brown Jr. (February 8, 1914 – May 25, 1989) was the United States Ambassador to Liberia from 1964 to 1969.

== Early life ==
Brown was born on February 8, 1914, in Spartanburg, South Carolina to parents Ben Hill and Clara Twitty Brown. His father was the mayor of Spartanburg in 1937.

== Military career ==
Brown served in the United States Army in World War II.

== Professional career ==
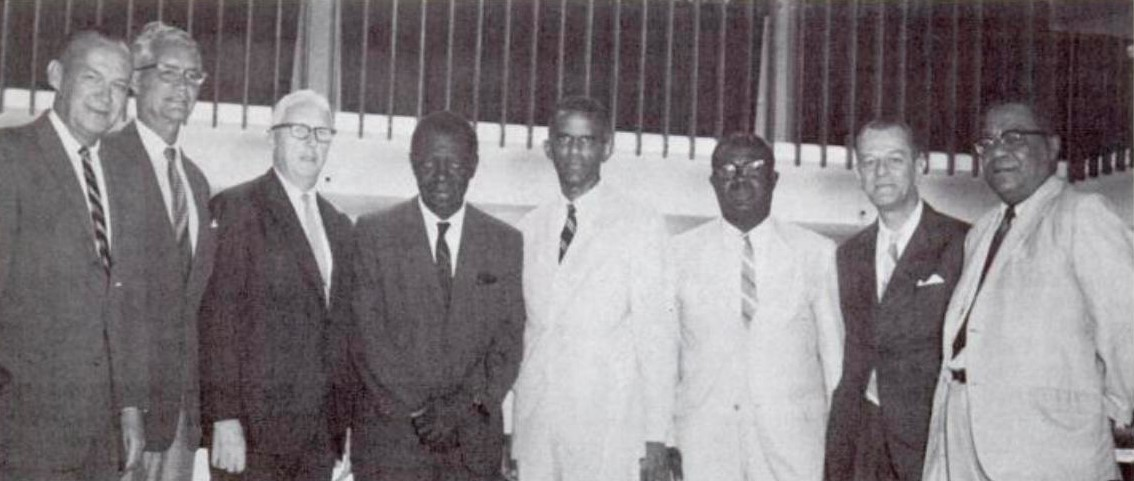
Brown (far left) with other American diplomats and Robert K. A. Gardiner in Accra in April 1967

Brown was a lawyer. Brown was appointed by President Lyndon B. Johnson to the position of United States Ambassador to Liberia on November 25, 1964. The presentation of his credentials occurred on January 6, 1965. He remained in this position until July 17, 1969.

== Personal life ==
Brown was a member of multiple fraternities such as Phi Delta Phi and Kappa Alpha Order. Brown was also a Freemason. Brown was Episcopalian.

== Death ==
Brown died on May 25, 1989, at the age of 75 of cancer in Georgetown University Hospital, Washington, D.C. His residence was in Alexandria, Virginia at the time of his death.
