= List of ambassadors of the United States to Liberia =

List of U.S Ambassadors to Liberia

Ambassador of the United States to Liberia
- Seal of the United States Department of State

- Flag of a United States ambassador

- Incumbent; Kristin Gilmore; Chargé d'affaires since September 25, 2026
- Nominator: The president of the United States
- Appointer: The president; with Senate advice and consent
- Inaugural holder: Abraham Hanson as Commissioner/Consul General
- Formation: June 8, 1863
- Website: U.S. Embassy – Monrovia

This is a record of ambassadors of the United States to Liberia.

Liberia, as a nation, had its beginnings in 1821 when groups of free blacks from the United States emigrated from the U.S. and began establishing colonies on the coast under the direction of the American Colonization Society. Between 1821 and 1847, by a combination of purchase and conquest, American Societies developed the colonies under the name "Liberia", dominating the native inhabitants of the area. In 1847 the colony declared itself an independent nation. Because it was already established as a nation, Liberia avoided becoming a European colony during the great age of European colonies in Africa during the latter half of the 19th century.

The United States recognized Liberia as an independent state in 1862 and commissioned its first representative to Liberia in 1863. The representative, Abraham Hanson, was appointed commissioner/consul general. The status of the commissioner was later upgraded to Minister, and finally to full ambassador in 1949. Relations between the United States and Liberia have been continuous since that time.

Eight U.S. ambassadors have died at their post serving in Liberia.

The U.S. embassy in Liberia is located in Monrovia.

== Ambassadors ==
Name	Title	Appointed	Presented credentials	Terminated mission	Notes
Abraham Hanson	Commissioner/Consul General	June 8, 1863	February 23, 1864	July 20, 1866	Died at post
John Seys	Minister Resident/Consul General	October 8, 1866	January 2, 1867	June 11, 1870	
J. Milton Turner	Minister Resident/Consul General	March 1, 1871	July 19, 1871	May 7, 1878	
John H. Smythe	Minister Resident/Consul General	May 23, 1878	August 19, 1878	December 22, 1881	
Henry Highland Garnet	Minister Resident/Consul General	June 30, 1881	December 22, 1881	February 13, 1882	Died at post
John H. Smythe	Minister Resident/Consul General	April 12, 1882	August 4, 1882	December 14, 1885	
Moses A. Hopkins	Minister Resident/Consul General	September 11, 1885	December 14, 1885	August 3, 1886	Died at post
Charles H. J. Taylor	Minister Resident/Consul General	March 11, 1887	June 4, 1887	c. September 22, 1887	
Ezekiel E. Smith	Minister Resident/Consul General	April 24, 1888	July 21, 1888	May 20, 1890	
Alexander Clark	Minister Resident/Consul General	August 16, 1890	November 25, 1890	May 31, 1891	Died at post
William D. McCoy	Minister Resident/Consul General	January 11, 1892	March 28, 1892	May 15, 1893	Died at post
William H. Heard	Minister Resident/Consul General	February 23, 1895	May 6, 1895	April 28, 1898	
Owen L. W. Smith	Minister Resident/Consul General	February 11, 1898	On or shortly before May 11, 1898	May 13, 1902	
John R. A. Crossland	Minister Resident/Consul General	January 16, 1902	May 13, 1902	January 30, 1903	
Ernest Lyon	Minister Resident/Consul General	March 16, 1903	July 27, 1903	c. August 25, 1910	
William D. Crum	Minister Resident/Consul General	June 13, 1910	August 25, 1910	September 17, 1912	
George Washington Buckner – Political appointee	Minister Resident/Consul General	September 10, 1913	December 8, 1913	April 15, 1915	
James L. Curtis – Political appointee	Minister Resident/Consul General	October 25, 1915	December 29, 1915	October 20, 1917	
Joseph L. Johnson – Political appointee	Minister Resident/Consul General	August 27, 1918	October 8, 1919	February 13, 1922	
Solomon Porter Hood – Political appointee	Minister Resident/Consul General	October 26, 1921	February 13, 1922	January 9, 1926	
William T. Francis – Political appointee	Minister Resident/Consul General	July 9, 1927	November 30, 1927	July 15, 1929	Died at post
Charles E. Mitchell – Political appointee	Envoy Extraordinary and Minister Plenipotentiary	January 20, 1931	Did not present credentials	March 22, 1933	Government of Liberia requested his recall on February 11, 1933
Lester A. Walton – Political appointee	Envoy Extraordinary and Minister Plenipotentiary	July 22, 1935	October 2, 1935	February 28, 1946	
Raphael O'Hara Lanier – Political appointee	Envoy Extraordinary and Minister Plenipotentiary	February 13, 1946	July 1, 1946	June 8, 1948	
Edward R. Dudley – Political appointee	Envoy Extraordinary and Minister Plenipotentiary	August 11, 1948	October 18, 1948	June 15, 1953	Promoted to Ambassador Extraordinary and Plenipotentiary March 18, 1949
Edward R. Dudley – Political appointee	Ambassador Extraordinary and Plenipotentiary	August 11, 1948	October 18, 1948	June 15, 1953	Promoted to Ambassador Extraordinary and Plenipotentiary March 18, 1949
Jesse D. Locker – Political appointee	Ambassador Extraordinary and Plenipotentiary	July 22, 1953	October 16, 1953	April 10, 1955	Died at post
Richard Lee Jones – Political appointee	Ambassador Extraordinary and Plenipotentiary	May 31, 1955	June 24, 1955	July 24, 1959	
Elbert G. Mathews – Career FSO	Ambassador Extraordinary and Plenipotentiary	August 12, 1959	September 30, 1959	May 4, 1962	
Charles Edward Rhetts – Political appointee	Ambassador Extraordinary and Plenipotentiary	July 5, 1962	August 7, 1962	September 30, 1964	
Ben H. Brown, Jr. – Career FSO	Ambassador Extraordinary and Plenipotentiary	November 25, 1964	January 6, 1965	July 17, 1969	
Samuel Z. Westerfield, Jr. – Career FSO	Ambassador Extraordinary and Plenipotentiary	July 8, 1969	December 9, 1969	July 19, 1972	Died at post
Melvin L. Manfull – Career FSO	Ambassador Extraordinary and Plenipotentiary	December 2, 1972	December 22, 1972	December 15, 1975	
W. Beverly Carter, Jr. – Career FSO	Ambassador Extraordinary and Plenipotentiary	April 6, 1976	April 23, 1976	January 1, 1979	
Robert P. Smith – Career FSO	Ambassador Extraordinary and Plenipotentiary	July 2, 1979	August 6, 1979	January 15, 1981	
William Lacy Swing – Career FSO	Ambassador Extraordinary and Plenipotentiary	July 18, 1981	August 11, 1981	June 10, 1985	
Edward Joseph Perkins – Career FSO	Ambassador Extraordinary and Plenipotentiary	July 12, 1985	August 28, 1985	October 22, 1986	
James Keough Bishop – Career FSO	Ambassador Extraordinary and Plenipotentiary	March 27, 1987	May 4, 1987	March 31, 1990	
Peter Jon de Vos – Career FSO	Ambassador Extraordinary and Plenipotentiary	June 22, 1990	Did not present credentials	July 27, 1992	From 1992–1999 the following officers served as chargés d’affaires ad interim: William H. Twaddell (September 1992 – July 1995), William B. Milam (November 1995 – January 1999), and Donald K. Petterson (February 1999 – August 1999).
Bismarck Myrick – Career FSO	Ambassador Extraordinary and Plenipotentiary	July 7, 1999	August 20, 1999	July 23, 2002	
John William Blaney – Career FSO	Ambassador Extraordinary and Plenipotentiary	August 8, 2002	October 3, 2002	July 13, 2005	
Donald E. Booth – Career FSO	Ambassador Extraordinary and Plenipotentiary	June 21, 2005	August 9, 2005	July 11, 2008	
Linda Thomas-Greenfield – Career FSO	Ambassador Extraordinary and Plenipotentiary	July 18, 2008	August 27, 2008	February 29, 2012	
Deborah R. Malac – Career FSO	Ambassador Extraordinary and Plenipotentiary	July 26, 2012	September 20, 2012	December 18, 2015	
Mark Boulware – Career FSO	Chargé d'Affaires ad interim	December 19, 2015		April 18, 2016	
Christine A. Elder – Career FSO	Ambassador Extraordinary and Plenipotentiary	May 17, 2016	June 23, 2016	March 21, 2020	
Michael A. McCarthy – Career FSO	Ambassador Extraordinary and Plenipotentiary	November 18, 2020	January 22, 2021	July 12, 2023	
Joel Maybury – Career FSO	Chargé d'Affaires ad interim	July 13, 2023		August 11, 2023	
Catherine Rodriguez – Career FSO	Chargé d'Affaires ad interim	August 11, 2023		August 2, 2024	
Mark Toner – Career FSO	Ambassador Extraordinary and Plenipotentiary	May 2, 2024	August 7, 2024	August 4, 2025	
Joe Zadrozny – Career FSO	Chargé d'Affaires ad interim	August 5, 2025		September 25, 2026	
Kristin Gilmore – Career FSO	Chargé d'Affaires ad interim	September 25, 2026		Present	

== See also ==
- Liberia – United States relations
- Foreign relations of Liberia
- Ambassadors of the United States
