= John H. Smythe =

American diplomat (1844–1908)

John Henry Smythe
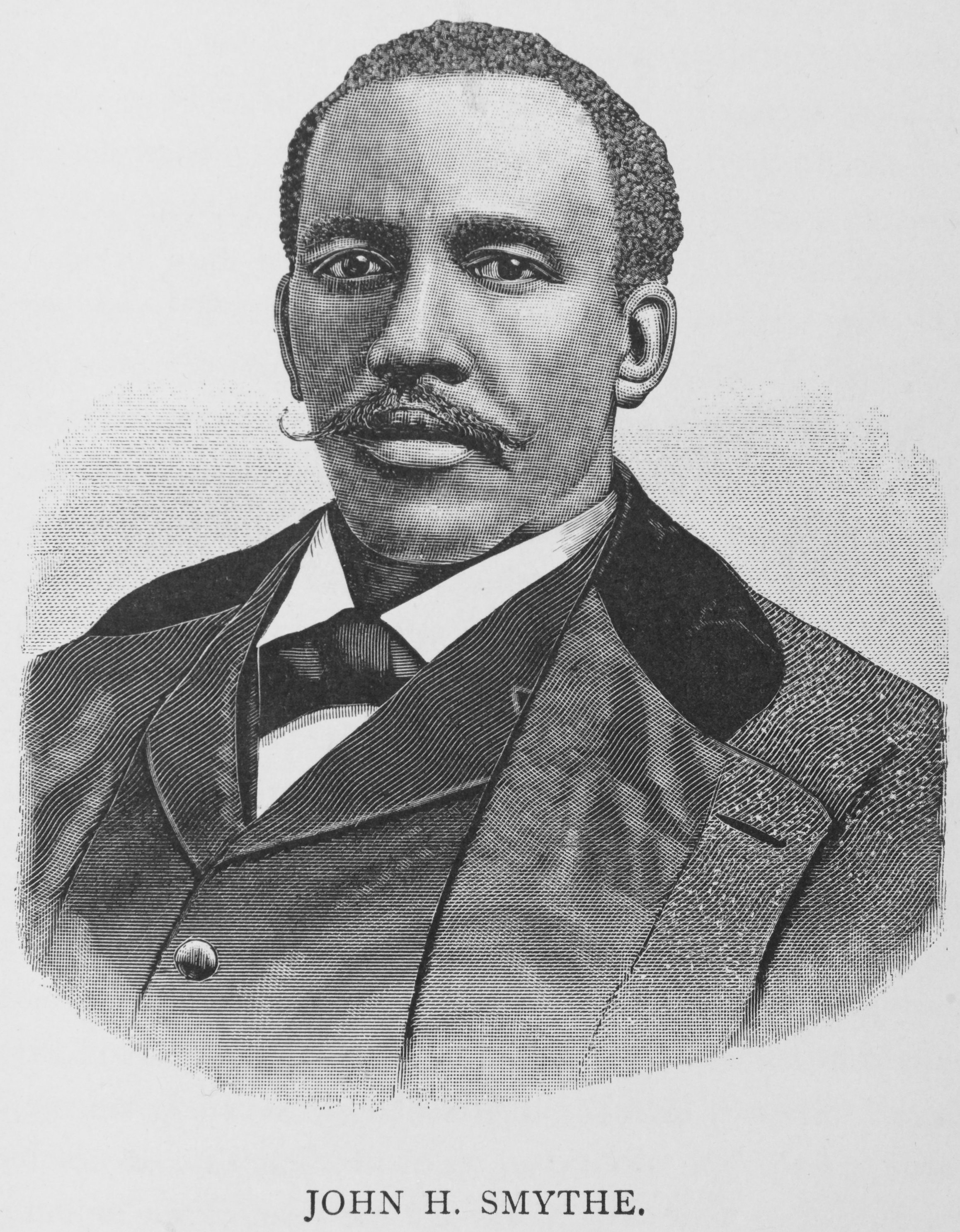
- Smythe in 1887

United States Minister to Liberia
- In office May 23, 1878 – December 22, 1881
- President: Rutherford B. Hayes; James A. Garfield
- Preceded by: J. Milton Turner
- Succeeded by: Henry H. Garnet
- In office April 12, 1882 – December 14, 1885
- President: Chester A. Arthur; Grover Cleveland
- Preceded by: Henry H. Garnet
- Succeeded by: Moses A. Hopkins

Personal details
- Born: July 14, 1844 Richmond, Virginia, U.S.
- Died: September 5, 1908 (aged 64) Richmond, Virginia, U.S.
- Party: Republican
- Education: Howard University
- Occupation: Politician, educator

John Henry Smythe or Smyth (July 14, 1844 – September 5, 1908) was an American diplomat who served as the United States ambassador to Liberia from 1878 to 1881 and from 1882 to 1885. Before his appointment, he had various clerkships in the federal government in Washington, DC, and in Wilmington, North Carolina. Later in his life he took part in a number of leading African American organizations and was president of a Reformatory School outside of Richmond, Virginia.

== Early life ==
John Henry Smythe was born on July 14, 1844, in Richmond, Virginia, to Sully and Ann Eliza Smythe. Sully died in 1857 and Ann Eliza died in 1883. Smythe was taught to read between the ages of five and seven. About the age of eight or nine he was sent to Philadelphia, Pennsylvania to be educated, and he first attended a Quaker school and then a grammar school. When Smythe's father died, he quit school and took a job as an errand boy in a dry goods store, although he returned to school after a year. in 1859 he entered the Quaker run Institute for Colored Youth led by Ebenezer D. Bassett, graduating May 4, 1862. Bassett would later be minister-resident to Haiti, holding the position 4 years before Smythe would be diplomat to Liberia. Smythe was a talented painter, and was admitted a member of the Academy of Fine Arts at Philadelphia, focusing on landscapes. After graduating, in 1864, he worked as a laborer in the china house of Tyndale & Mitchell, and worked as an Army sutler's clerk for a short time during the American Civil War (1861–1865).

== Career ==
=== London and Washington, DC ===
In 1865, on the recommendation of John W. Forney and Shelton Mackenzie, Smythe traveled to London to learn acting, intending to meet with the famous actors Ira Aldridge (who was in St. Petersburg and Smythe did not meet) and Samuel Phelps. Smythe's money ran short and he returned home, abandoning hopes for a career on the stage. Smythe took manual labor work and, on the advice of William Whipper, began teaching at a school in Wilkes Barre, Pennsylvania. In 1869, Smythe enrolled at Howard University Law School where John Mercer Langston was dean. As a student, he was appointed by Henry M. Wittlesey clerk in the Freedmen's Bureau on January 12, 1870. On August 15 of that year he resigned to become a clerk in the United States Census. Smythe was one of the forty-nine clerks who resigned from that department in protest in 1872, and he was then appointed clerk in the internal revenue agent of the Treasury Department on August 1, 1872, resigning that appointment in November to take another appointment from George S. Boutwell as internal revenue storekeeper. He resigned from this position on January 8, 1873, to take a position as a clerk in the Freedman's Savings Bank in Washington, DC, but was soon sent to Wilmington, North Carolina to be a cashier in the bank there. When the Freedmen's Bank failed, Smythe remained in Wilmington and passed the North Carolina Bar.

=== Wilmington and Liberia ===
In Wilmington, Smythe was politically active. He was a member of the State Constitutional Convention in 1875 and supported the Republican Party, campaigning for Ulysses S. Grant and Rutherford B. Hayes in their presidential campaigns. He became acquainted with a man named Adam Empie, and through him to Senator Matthew W. Ransom, who in 1878 recommended Smythe to Secretary of State William M. Evarts to the position of United States Ambassador to Liberia. Smythe's appointment was also supported by Frederick Douglass and Blanche K. Bruce and he received the appointment on May 23, 1878. He was recalled by President James A. Garfield and reappointed by President Chester A. Arthur on April 12, 1882. During his terms, he also had charge of the German Consulate at Monrovia for six months, and for a short time the Belgian Consulate. He also represented the King of Sweden and Norway, Oscar II of Sweden, on the request of the minister from the Union of Sweden and Norway to the United States, Carl Lewenhaupt. In Africa, he hired natives to their countries to posts of consuls and consular agents in Africa, creating good relations between the nations of West Central Africa and the United States. He was given an honorary LL. D. by the board of trustees at Liberia College, and was appointed knight commander of the Liberian Humane Order of African Redemption by Liberian president Hilary R. W. Johnson on December 28, 1885. Smythe was recalled by President Grover Cleveland on March 25, 1885, and returned to Washington DC to practice law.

=== Participation in civic organizations ===
In December 1877, Smythe was one of a number of important African-American leaders who formed the Negro American Society, led by Alexander Crummell and John Wesley Cromwell which dissolved by 1880 but twenty years later reformed as the American Negro Academy.

Smythe wrote introductions to volumes of poetry by Daniel Webster Davis, and worked with poet George Moses Horton.

On March 5, 1897, Smythe was a part of the formation of the American Negro Academy led by Alexander Crummell. Also in 1897 he helped found the Virginia Manual Labor School to carry out the program of the Negro Reformatory Association of Virginia in Broad Neck Farm, Hanover County, Virginia. In the fall of 1898, Smythe attended meetings in Rochester led by Alexander Walters, T. Thomas Fortune, John C. Dancy, Ida B. Wells, and John W. Thompson which marked the formation of the Afro-American Council. Smyth addressed the council, stating that he could not support the organization as the organization "opposed separate schools and favored mixed marriages" and he severed ties with the group. In fact, Smythe was an outspoken opponent of intermarriage and integrated schools as he felt independence was important for racial pride and solidarity, but which put him at odds with many black leaders.

=== Other organizations ===
Among his many memberships, Smythe was a member of the London Atheneum Club. He was a prominent member of the Grand Fountain of the United Order of True Reformers, a Richmond civic organization, and Smythe was editor and chief of the organization's paper, The Reformer, and was chief of the Bureau of Information of the group from 1892 to 1896. In 1903, Smythe formed and was the president of a company called, "Negro Development and Exposition Company of the United States of America" which sought to raise money for a black exhibit for the 1907 Jamestown Exposition in Norfolk in 1907.

== Personal life, death and legacy ==
Smythe was a Presbyterian in religion and married Fannie Shappen and had children. He died in Richmond, Virginia on September 5, 1908, at the home of his daughter, Dr. Clara H. Smythe.

An elementary school for black children in Norfolk, Virginia, was named for Smythe.

John Henry Clavell Smythe, a Sierra Leone Creole flight navigator in World War II, barrister, Attorney-General, was a grandson and namesake of John Henry Smythe.
