= John L. Waller =

American politician, journalist, publisher, businessman, military leader and diplomat

John L. Waller

John Lewis Waller (January 12, 1850 – 1907) was an African American lawyer, politician, journalist, publisher, businessman, military leader, and diplomat whose rise culminated in his becoming the United States consul to Madagascar. He was the grandfather of Negro World editor, poet, composer, and lyricist Andy Razaf. (Razaf's frequent collaborator, musician Fats Waller, was no relation.)

Waller was born into slavery in New Madrid County, Missouri. At the end of the American Civil War, he moved with his family to a farm in Tama County, Iowa. Waller's formal education, begun in 1863, ended with his graduation from high school in Toledo, Iowa.

== Political career ==
Waller entered politics while living in Iowa. While living in Cedar Rapids and working as a barber, he was permitted to use the law library of Judge N.M. Hubbard.

Waller passed the bar in October 1877. On May 1 of the next year, he moved to Topeka, Kansas, in response to "Pap" Singleton's call for African-Americans to colonize the state.

On March 10, 1882, Waller founded the Western Recorder; the newspaper continued publication until 1885 in Lawrence, Kansas. In Topeka, Kansas, during February 1888, Waller and his cousin Anthony Morton established The American Citizen.

In 1888, Waller became the first black presidential elector, supporting the Republican ticket of Benjamin Harrison and Levi Morton. He was charged with the responsibility to transport the results of the Kansan vote to Washington, D.C., that year.

After the election, Waller unsuccessfully campaigned to become the state auditor for Kansas. In 1891, President Harrison named him U.S. consul to the Merina Kingdom of Madagascar.

== Consul to Madagascar and detention by the French ==
As newly appointed consul, Waller traveled to Madagascar with his wife and daughter. He strongly supported Queen Ranavalona III and British and American communities in their efforts to hold off colonial encroachment by the French. Following his election, President Grover Cleveland replaced Waller as consul with Edward Telfair Wetter.

The Waller family had grown close to the royal family. Although his term as consul had ended, Waller decided to stay in Madagascar. The queen granted him a concession of 150,000 acres (610 km^{2}) on the southern end of the island, lush with mahogany, ebony, rosewood, and rubber trees. Waller promoted African-American and Mauritian immigration to his concession, offering favorable terms to migrants to what he called "Wallerland". He envisioned an agricultural community free from racism.

In 1895, Waller's teenage daughter Jennie wed Henri Razafinkarefo, nephew of the queen. Later that year, with threats of French invasion looming, Waller had his wife and daughter — now pregnant with the baby who would grow up to be Andy Razaf — sent back to the United States for their safety.

Following the second Franco-Hova war, the queen was deposed and several members of the royal family — including Waller's young son-in-law — were killed. After France entered into a treaty with the Malagasy government, the French Resident objected to the granting of the concession without French permission. (The French may have believed that Waller's success in developing his concession infringed upon their efforts to colonize the island.) French authorities arrested Waller and accused him of having been a spy who provided military information to the Hovas in their attempts to maintain their country's monarchy and independence. Despite an extraterritoriality agreement between France and the United States, Waller was court-martialed and sentenced to twenty years' imprisonment. He was placed in irons and sent to France via the Suez Canal.

Congressional resolutions and pressure from John Mercer Langston led American president Grover Cleveland to demand that Waller be set free, and he was released after ten months' incarceration in Marseille and Clairvaux Prison. However, the French did not return his concession, which they declared invalid and confiscated.

== Later career ==
After his release, Waller returned to the United States, gathered his family, and began a law practice in Kansas City.

In August 1898, he organized a company of African-American soldiers to serve in the Spanish–American War. The group became Company C of the 23rd Kansas Volunteer Infantry, with Waller serving as a captain.

They were sent to Cuba as it was felt by leading Army officers that they would fare better in the tropical climates of the country due to their African heritage. Hostilities had ceased on the island, so their mission had more to do with maintaining peace and order there, especially between the Cubans and the Spanish as well as completing some public works. The regiment was mustered out on April 10, 1899, with a loss of only 14 lives.

After the war, Waller and his family moved to New York, where he died of pneumonia in 1907.
