= The American Citizen =

American newspaper published in Kansas

The American Citizen was a newspaper published in Kansas City and Topeka, Kansas from 1888 to 1909.

The paper urged community support for the Governor's Guard, an African American militia. It was one of the papers that noted writer and humorist Will Harris worked at.

It decried Republican Party leaders for removing African Americans from patronage jobs in 1899.

C. H. J. Taylor was its editor and a Populist Party candidate for state legislator in 1892. The paper described the burning at the stake of Fred Alexander as a warning African Americans needed to heed and unite or be exterminated.

== See also ==
- Daily American Citizen – a companion daily paper
