= Union Literary Institute =

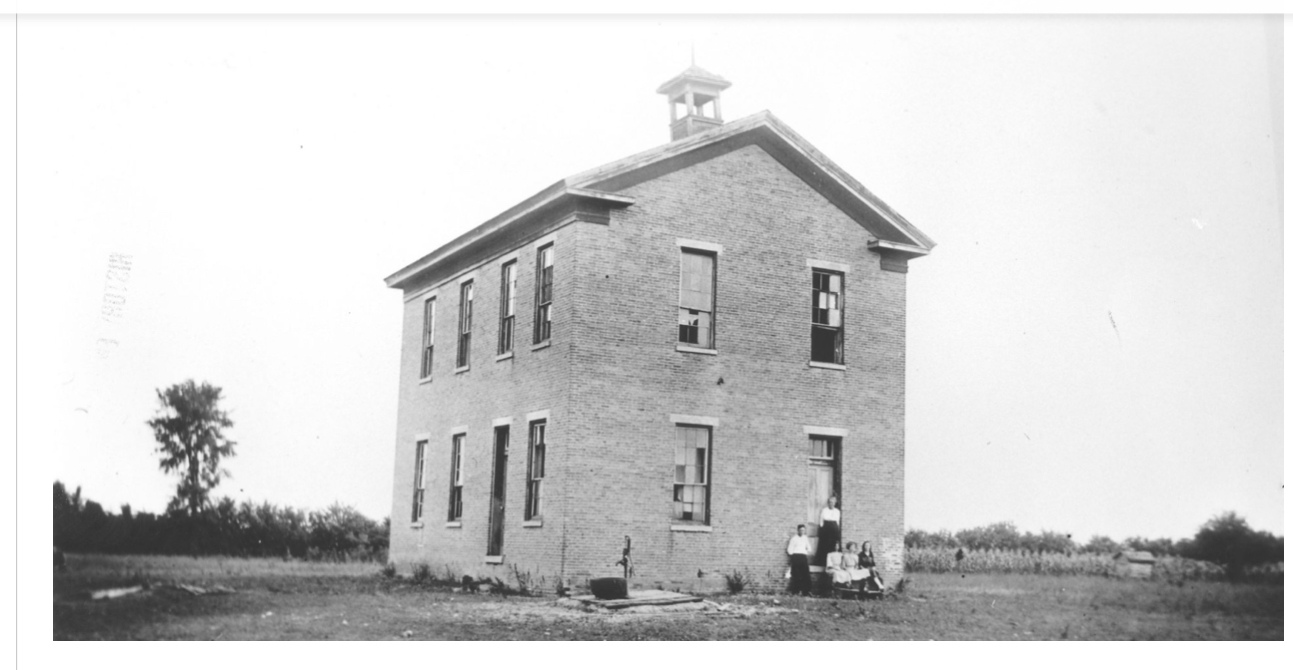

Location
- Rural Randolph County, Indiana (8605 East County Road 600 South, Union City, Indiana); United States; 40°04′38″N 84°48′59″W

Information
- Type: Racially integrated
- Established: 1846
- Founder: Quakers and free blacks
- Closed: 1880
- Principal: Ebenezer Tucker (1)
- Faculty: Ebenezer Tucker, Samuel Smothers
- Campus size: 174 acres (70 ha)
- Campus type: Agricultural
- Publication: The Students' Repository

The Union Literary Institute, located in rural Randolph County, Indiana, at 8605 East County Road 600 South, Union City, Indiana (at its founding, "two miles east of Spartanburg"), was a historic school founded in 1846 primarily for blacks by abolitionist Quakers and free blacks in three local communities. Only white students were allowed to attend the public schools in the state. The term "literary institute" at the time meant a non-religious school.

This school was among the handful in the United States of the time that admitted both black and white students; it was the first in Indiana. The school closed in 1864 during the Civil War, when its only teacher enlisted in the United States Colored Troops. The students published a magazine from 1863-1864, which included articles by adults. The school re-opened after the war, operating until 1880; it closed because of declining enrollment.

In 1924, after three decades of court challenges, the state acquired the building and the remaining 120 acres of the original site. The county had operated the structure as a segregated public school in the late nineteenth century. In the early 20th century, the structure was converted for use as a storage barn. In 2016 a historical marker was erected at the former school, noting its valuable history. It is within the Ohio River National Freedom Corridor.

== Background ==
In the antebellum period, free blacks and free people of color formed three settlements in Randolph County, coming mostly from North Carolina, Kentucky and Ohio. These were known as Greenville, Cabin Creek and Snow Creek. By 1845 an estimated 500 blacks lived in the county. The state prohibited children of color from attending public school. These communities and local Quakers, who supported education and abolitionism, joined to found a school to educate black children. They set up a biracial board.

== The school ==
The first meeting of the Board of Managers, which had both black and white members, was held on September 4, 1845, at the Society of Friends (Quaker) Meeting House in Newport (now Fountain City). Levi Coffin was on the board.

The school was designed along the manual labor model, in which students over the age of 14 defrayed educational costs through work, in this case, farm work. In the late 19th century, it was cited as the most successful and enduring of the manual labor schools, but it was supported primarily by donations.

"Union" is said to have refer to the three nearby settlements of free blacks which the school primarily served: Cabin Creek, Snow Creek, and Greenville, which straddled the Indiana-Ohio line in the southeast part of the county. In 1860 Randolph County "held the highest percentage of African American residents of any county in Indiana in 1860 (in 1850, it was the 6th highest)", with "a high percentage of anti-slavery whites".

Union and other manual labor schools

educated hundreds of young men and women, liberally for the time, at little expense practically, and with wholesome views of life. Such schools were truly the colleges of the people. They made the best secondary learning available, if not to all, at least to many.

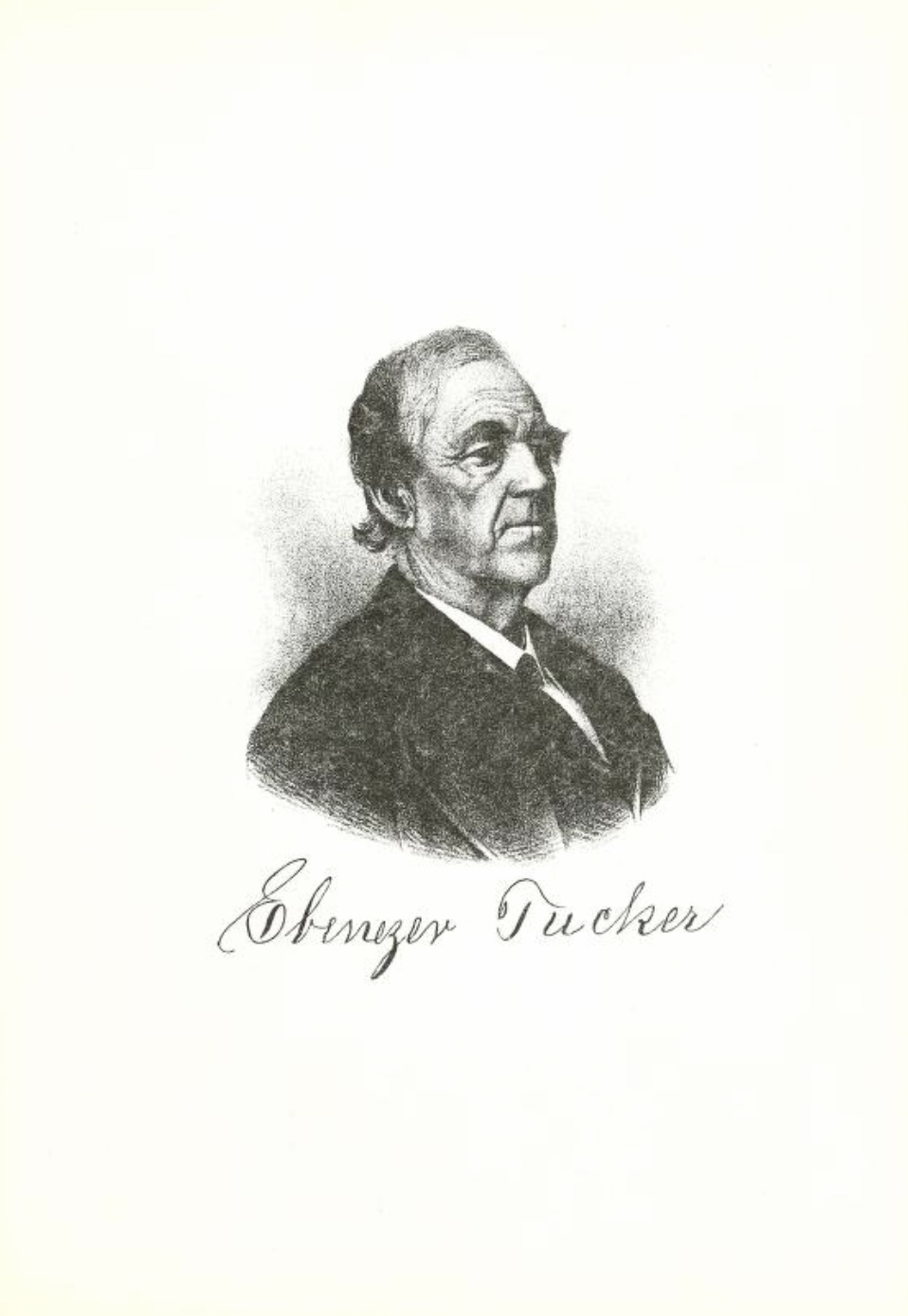
Ebenezer Tucker. Picture from his History of Randolph County, Indiana, 1882.

The curriculum, in 1864, in the "Primary Department", consisted of orthography, reading, writing, "first mental arithmetic", "written arithmetic through fractions", and geography. In the "Higher Department", the subjects were second mental arithmetic, written arithmetic, English grammar, physiology, natural philosophy [science], chemistry, and "first algebra".

== Staff ==
The first teacher, Rev. Ebenezer Tucker, who was white, was a graduate of the integrated, abolitionist Oneida Institute. He also had a 1844 ministerial degree from Oberlin College, which supported abolition. Tucker served as principal from 1846 through 1854. After serving as President of Liber College from 1859 to 1868, he returned to Union as teacher and principal from 1873 to 1879.

The Institution owns one hundred and seventy-four acres of good land, of which more than one hundred are under cultivation. It is located in a flourishing settlement, numbering more than four hundred, and there are other large colored settlements in the region. — There is a boarding house, with accommodations for forty, male and female, and a school house for one hundred scholars. Expenses besides labor, from $20 to $30 per year. The school is conducted on religious (not sectarian) principles. Its Board of Managers belong to five religious denominations. A large number, viz. three hundred colored youth, have received instruction since its establishment, a considerable number of whom have been and are teachers. Perhaps a larger number of colored youth attend this School than any other of the kind in the country. ...Fully three-fourths of the whole number have been persons of color. The Institution has had a hard struggle, but every year adds to its stability and increases its usefulness. Much instruction is here imparted at small expence.... We think well of its plan of "union," bringing colored and white students together, as if indeed the circumstance of color were altogether an accidental and unimportant thing.

An 1892 history of education in Indiana noted that the Institute was known as "the Nigger College", and that it was "exclusively for colored people, and one of the most successful of its kind". A 1924 newspaper account said that the school had been established to educate poor black youths, and some indigent whites also enrolled, making it an early example of racial integration in the Midwest.

The black population in the area scattered and declined after the Civil War. The school operated with declining enrollment until 1880, when it closed.

== The Students' Repository ==
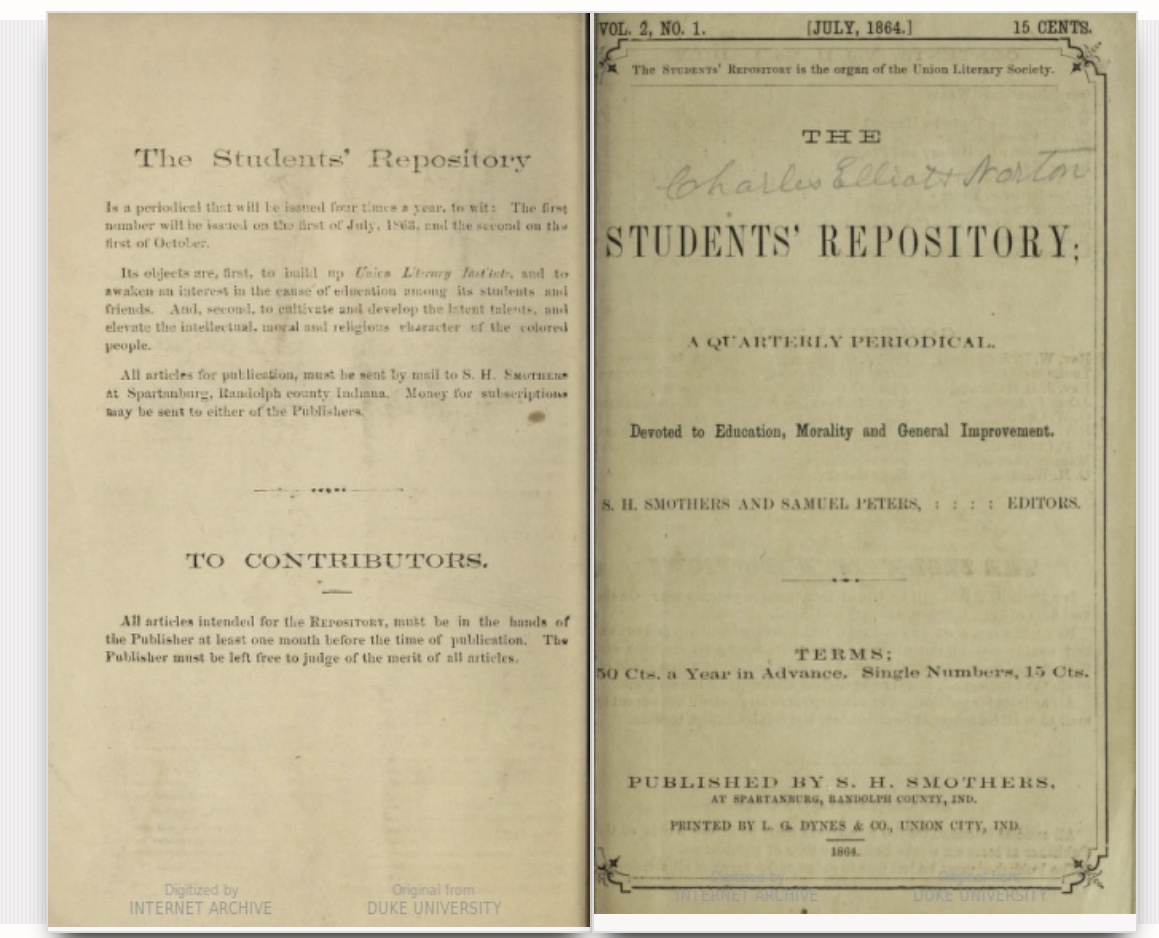
Cover of The Students' Repository, the magazine of the Union Literary Institute.

From 1863 until 1864, students published six numbers of The Students' Repository: A Quarterly Periodical, Devoted to Education, Morality & General Improvement, "organ of the students and friends of the Union Literary Institute". One thousand copies were printed of one issue.

The magazine received some national recognition, being mentioned in Harper's Weekly and receiving three pages in the North American Review.

The review ended publication during the American Civil War, after the school's only teacher and editor, Samuel H. Smothers, volunteered for the United States Colored Troops. (Smothers was an African-American man who had received nine months of formal education before starting to serve as a teacher.) The school suspended operations when he left.)

Among the contents of the Repository:

- "Uncle Abram", a report on an elderly slave who was whipped severely, by E[lkanah] Beard, "chief field agent in the Mississippi valley for the Freedman's Committee of the Indiana Yearly Meeting of Friends". Beard also contributed "A Trip Down the Mississippi River", on conditions in the contraband camps set up in the wake of the advancing Union armies. Beard's journals were not transcribed in full and published until 2017.
- Charles Eliot Norton, editor of the North American Review, also contributed an article to the Students' Repository: "The Moral Unity of the Human Race", described as an "Extract from an Address...on the 'Correspondence of American Principles in Religion and Politics', read before the Autumnal Convention of the Unitarians, at Springfield, Mass., Oct. 14, 1863."
- Also by Norton: "The Legend of the Wandering Jew", along with an "extract from one of his recent letters to us", appeared in the final issue, dated October 1864.

== Later years ==
Founders' heirs continued to own title to the property in the name of the Institute. The structure was used by the county for a period as a public school. The state challenged the Institute in a legal challenge to gain control of the property. After nearly 30 years of court cases, during which the school did not operate and buildings deteriorated, the Jay circuit court ruled in 1924 that the Union Literary Institute owned the remaining structures and 120 acres of property. It ordered that a commissioner be appointed to sell it, and give the monies to the state for state institutions.

The two-story brick building survived, although the second floor was removed when it was used as a barn. By 2010 it was bought by the Union Literary Institute Preservation Society.

== Notable students ==
- Hiram Rhodes Revels, the first African American U.S. senator
- Joseph Lowery Johnson, physician and U.S. ambassador to Liberia
- James Sidney Hinton, the first African American elected to the Indiana House of Representatives
- Amanda Way, president of the Indiana Women's Suffrage movement

== Archival material ==
The William Henry Smith Memorial Library of the Indiana Historical Society, Indianapolis, owns the Union Literary Institute Recording Secretary's book, 1845–1890.

== Legacy and honors ==
- The Union Literary Institute Preservation Society was founded to preserve the historic structure, and materials related to founding and operation of the school. By 2010 it owned the building, but a 2012 storm destroyed most of the front wall, leaving it in ruins. The Society hopes to create a pavilion to protect the remainder and promote interpretation of the site. It has worked with Randolph County Commissioners and Ball State University to develop the plan.
- A historical marker at the site was erected in 2016 by the Indiana Historical Bureau and the Union Literary Institute Preservation Society.
