= William Henry Heard =

American clergyman and diplomat (1850–1937)

William H. Heard
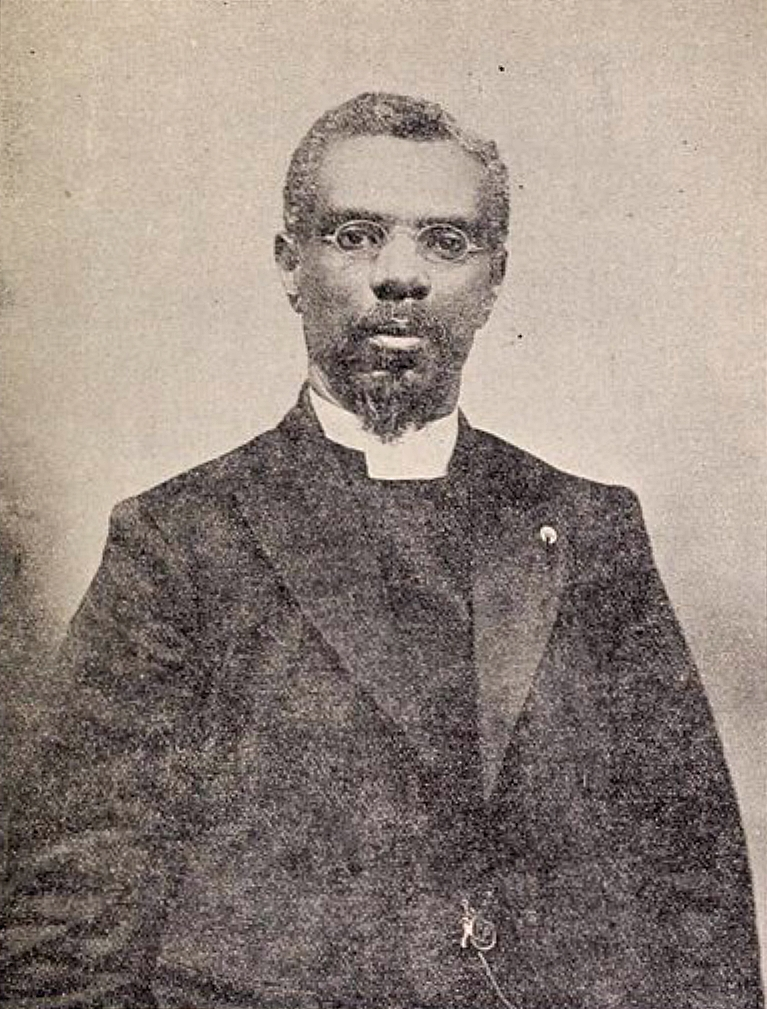
- Born: June 25, 1850; Elbert County, Georgia, U.S.
- Died: September 12, 1937 (aged 87); Philadelphia, Pennsylvania, U.S.
- Occupations: Minister, U.S. Ambassador to Liberia
- Political party: Republican
- Spouse: Josephine Delphine Henderson (m. 1882)

William Henry (Harrison) Heard (June 25, 1850 – September 12, 1937) was a clergyman of the African Methodist Episcopal Church who served as United States Ambassador to Liberia from 1895 through 1898.

== Early life, family and education ==
William Heard was born into slavery about 1843 (1850?) in Elbert County, Georgia, some three miles from the small settlement of Longstreet. His father was George W. Heard (b. circa 1813), recorded in the 1870 census as of mixed race. Before emancipation, he was an enslaved skilled workman: he worked first as a blacksmith and later as a wheelwright and carpenter. George did not know the name of his mother. His biological father was said to have been a white man named Thomas Heard (probably Thomas Jefferson Heard, son of planter Stephen Heard).

William Heard's mother was an enslaved woman, Pathenia or Parthenia Galloway (d. circa 1859). She was skilled in plowing, but she was also valued by her owners as a "breeder" (a woman who regularly produced children). She was allowed to work close to her own cabin in order to nurse and care for her children. As slaves, Heard's parents were prohibited from legally recognized marriage. Also, they were held by planters on separate estates some three miles apart, so could not live together. George Heard was given permission by his owners to visit his family twice a week when his labor was not required (overnight, Wednesday-Thursday: Sunday).

As a young child Heard was sold twice with his family: his mother and three siblings Millie, Beverley and Cordelia. Their youngest brother, George Clark Heard, was born later. When he was nine and working as a servant in the household where his mother was a cook, both she and his elder sister died of typhoid fever. At age ten Heard was set to work as a plow boy on a farm.

At fifteen, having been assaulted by a drunken "boss man" and becoming aware of the potential ending of his slave status after the Civil War, he fled and began living with his father. He kept a wheelwright's shop in Elberton. Although slaves were prohibited from learning to read and write, Heard attended Sunday school and trained his memory by learning large amounts of the Bible by rote.

=== Post-Emancipation ===
After emancipation, while living with his father, Heard paid a white schoolboy ten cents a lesson to teach him basic literacy. He also began working for a local farmer, earning five dollars a month. He also arranged to recite back to him a lesson Heard had learned over lunch. This farmer was William H. Heard, from whom Heard took his surname (he had previously been known only as "Henry"). Heard attempted a similar arrangement with another local farmer.

But, dissatisfied with the education he was receiving, he returned to his father's shop to work. By this time a school had been set up in Elberton for freedmen and their children, which he could attend. By following every opportunity for education, Heard in time achieved a teaching qualification and a place at the state university. He attended the University of South Carolina until 1877, when white Democrats regained control of the state government and prohibited black students from attending the flagship college.

== Career ==
In the 1870s during the Reconstruction era Heard was elected to the state legislature in South Carolina, serving in the South Carolina Senate from 1876 to 1877 as a Republican representing Abbeville County, but was removed when the Democrats achieved power. Because of his political interests he was not allowed to find work as a teacher in the state. He later completed his education in Philadelphia.

In 1878 Heard, whose parents had followed Baptist and Methodist faiths, joined the African Methodist Episcopal Church, formed in the early 19th century as the first independent black denomination in the United States. He rose rapidly through its ranks, being ordained elder in 1883 and elected as a bishop in 1908. In addition to being a minister, he was an active organizer and fundraiser, held appointments to numerous missions, and from 1888 attended all A.M.E. general conferences as delegate.

He also continued to press for equal treatment for all citizens, regardless of color. In 1887 Heard launched a legal challenge against the Georgia Railroad Company over its practice of providing separate and inferior accommodation for blacks while charging them full prices.

With the help of Henry McNeal Turner, head Bishop of the AME Church, Heard obtained a diplomatic appointment, being nominated as Minister Resident and Consul General to Liberia by President Grover Cleveland on February 21, 1895. While in Monrovia, Heard also served as superintendent of the Liberia Annual Conference of the A.M.E. Church. He built the first A.M.E. church in the city, the Eliza Turner Memorial Chapel. Before returning to America, he toured Europe, observing during a visit to the British Museum that the mummies of Ancient Egypt were clearly of African, not Caucasian, ethnicity. He said that racial prejudice was less strong in France than in any English-speaking country, and seemed non-existent in Switzerland.

Heard continued to be active in the affairs of his church for the rest of his life. He attended the second World Conference on Faith and Order in Edinburgh, Scotland, a month before his death. In response to reports circulating in the press that he had been refused accommodation by an Edinburgh hotel on grounds of color, he was invited to meet the Chancellor of the Exchequer, Sir John Simon, and his wife, at another. The Archbishop of York also offered him hospitality.

== Marriage ==
Heard married Josephine Delphine Henderson of Salisbury, N.C., in 1882.

== Death ==
William H. Heard died in Philadelphia on September 12, 1937. His death was reported in major newspapers both in the United States and in Britain.

== Works ==
- Africa: Verse and Song Atlanta, Ga. : Union Publishing Col., [ca. 1900?]
- The Bright Side of African Life A.M.E. Publishing Co, Philadelphia, 1898
- From slavery to the bishopric in the A.M.E. Church New York : Arno Press, 1969.
- The American Negro's Opportunities in Africa (essay)
