= Spartanburg, Indiana =

- Unincorporated community and Census-designated place
- Location within Indiana Location within the United States
- Coordinates: 40°04′02″N 84°51′08″W
- Country: United States
- State: Indiana
- County: Randolph
- Township: Greensfork
- Elevation: 1,184 ft (361 m)
- Time zone: UTC-5 (Eastern (EST))
  - Summer (DST): UTC-4 (EDT)
- ZIP code: 47355
- Area code: 765
- FIPS code: 18-71774
- GNIS feature ID: 2830509

Spartanburg is an unincorporated community in Greensfork Township, Randolph County, in the U.S. state of Indiana.

== History ==
Spartanburg was first known as Newberg, and under the latter name was founded in 1832. A post office was established under the name Spartanburg in 1842, and remained in operation until it was discontinued in 1907.

The Union Literary Institute, a school founded by Quakers for African-American students, was 2 miles from Spartanburg.

== Demographics ==
Historical population
| Census | Pop. | Note | %± |
|---|---|---|---|
| 2023 (est.) | 55 |

The United States Census Bureau defined Spartanburg as a census designated place in the 2022 American Community Survey.
