= Abraham Hanson =

American diplomat (1818-1866)

Abraham Hanson: U.S. diplomat, pastor, municipal official

Abraham Hanson (1818–1866) was an English-born American pastor and U.S. diplomat.

== Personal life ==
Hanson was born near Bromley in South Yorkshire and was educated at Bromley College.

He moved to the United States to become a pastor in the Methodist Episcopal Church pastor, serving in parishes in Aurora, Illinois, Chicago, Milwaukee and Racine, Wisconsin. He left the ministry in 1851 due to poor health and relocated to Kenosha, Wisconsin, where he became involved in local politics and was elected city treasurer for several terms.

== Professional career ==
In May 1862, he became a U.S. Commercial Agent in Liberia and on June 8, 1863, he was appointed by President Abraham Lincoln to become the first U. S. Commissioner/Consul General to Liberia. The United States Senate confirmed the appointment on January 12, 1864. He presented his credentials to the Liberian government on February 23, 1864. In 1866, Hanson became ill during his diplomatic service. He died on July 20, 1866, and was buried in Monrovia, the Liberian capital.
