= List of Cosby episodes =

This is an episode list for the American television sitcom Cosby, which aired on CBS from September 16, 1996 to April 28, 2000. A total of 96 episodes were produced, spanning four seasons.

== Series overview ==
Season	Episodes	Originally released	
Season	Episodes	First released	Last released
1	25	September 16, 1996	May 19, 1997
2	24	September 15, 1997	May 18, 1998
3	25	September 21, 1998	May 17, 1999
4	22	September 29, 1999	April 28, 2000

== Episodes ==
=== Season 1 (1996–1997) ===
No. overall	No. in season	Title	Directed by	Written by	Original release date	Prod. code	Viewers (millions)
1	1	"Pilot"	John Whitesell	Story by : David Renwick; Teleplay by : Dennis Klein	September 16, 1996	101	24.68
Corporate downsizing forces Hilton Lucas into an unplanned retirement. Hilton must watch Shelly the turtle. Guest star: Sean Whalen (Dry-cleaner clerk)
2	2	"It's My Party"	John Whitesell	David Landsberg	September 23, 1996	102	21.17
Hilton expects a retirement surprise party from his former employer. Guest stars: Gerry Gibson (Bob), Harvey Vernon (Mr. Stevens)
3	3	"Neighborhood Watch"	John Whitesell	Vanessa Middleton	September 30, 1996	104	17.90
Crime-fighter Hilton goes overboard. Guest stars: Tom Mardirosian (Buddy), Danton Stone (Plumber), Rosemary De Angelis (Sidra)
4	4	"Happily Ever Hilton"	John Whitesell	Adam Belanoff	October 7, 1996	105	17.60
Hilton tries to get his old job back. Guest stars: Klea Scott (Nurse Suzanne Cratchet), Joe Zaloom (Screaming patient), Tony Sirico
5	5	"The Best Little Antique Shop in Astoria"	John Whitesell	David Wyatt	October 14, 1996	107	17.03
Hilton takes a job at an antiques store but doesn't know there's a secret brothel in the back.
6	6	"One Foot in Your Mouth"	John Whitesell	Saul Turteltaub & Bernie Orenstein	October 21, 1996	106	15.2
Hilton gets caught in his own lie when he tries to get out of attending a wedding. Guest stars: Richard Libertini (Dave), Marian Seldes (Elaine)
7	7	"Natural Born Debtors"	John Whitesell	Vanessa Middleton	October 28, 1996	108	16.4
Hilton tries to help Pauline's overly sensitive, financially irresponsible goddaughter. Guest stars: Meredith Gordon (Wendy O'Brien), Marcia Jean Kurtz (Gladys), Peter Jay Fernandez (Mr. Carter)
8	8	"The Two Mr. Lucases"	John Whitesell	Adam Belanoff	November 4, 1996	109	19.16
Because of a hospital mixup, Hilton gets the colonoscopy that was meant for his cousin. Guest stars: Míriam Colón (Lillian Lucas), Karen Shallo (Nurse Angela), Gerry Bamman (Dr. Martin), Jerry Mayer
9	9	"No Nudes Is Good Nudes"	John Whitesell	David Landsberg & David Wyatt	November 11, 1996	111	16.5
Hilton helps the nude model from his art class. Guest stars: Edward Hibbert (Mr. Woodhall), Jernard Burks (Model's husband), Shari Headley (Model).
10	10	"Basketball Story"	John Whitesell	Frank Mula	November 18, 1996	112	17.6
Lucky basketball ticketholder Hilton will win $1 million if he can make a half court shot. Guest stars: Howard David (Sports announcer), Penny Hardaway (Himself), Jenifer Lewis (Bernice), Ed Wheeler (Leon)
11	11	"Guard Almighty"	John Whitesell	Saul Turteltaub & Bernie Orenstein	November 25, 1996	113	15.97
Security guard Hilton deals with a robber and the Yankees. Guest stars: David Cone (Himself), Ray Girardin, Harry Murphy, Joe Torre (Himself)
12	12	"The Broken Reflection"	John Whitesell	Dennis Klein	December 2, 1996	103	16.46
Hilton's brother (Roscoe Lee Browne) is in town for an honorary degree. Guest star: Roscoe Lee Browne (George Lucas)
13	13	"Tempus Lucas"	John Whitesell	John Rogers	December 16, 1996	114	14.1
Hilton hits the gym a little too hard while trying to get in shape for a physical examination. Guest stars: Ranjit Chowdhry (Mr. Singh), Robert Stanton (Mr. Acker)
14	14	"Guess Whose President Is Coming to Dinner"	John Whitesell	David Landsberg	January 6, 1997	116	15.82
Hilton calls a radio talk show and gets invited to dine with the President. Guest stars: Ranjit Chowdhry (Mr. Singh), Rudy Giuliani (Himself), Anthony Heald (Benjamin Dean)
15	15	"Brave New Hilton"	John Whitesell	Elise Allen	January 13, 1997	115	16.63
Hilton helps when a buddy's goose-feather business is down. Guest stars: Jerry Becker (Rupert Macy), Julius Carry (Bradshaw Kinsy), Ranjit Chowdhry (Mr. Singh), Penny Johnson (Penny)
16	16	"Lucas Platonicus"	John Whitesell	John Rogers & Chris Downey	February 3, 1997	117	16.19
Hilton attempts satellite-dish installation. After pursuing Erica for 10 years, Griffin decides to finally give up. Guest stars: Daryl "Chill" Mitchell (Mike Julien), Al Espinosa (Jeff)
17	17	"Valentine's Day"	John Whitesell	Howard Meyers	February 10, 1997	118	17.28
When Hilton realizes that he has bought Ruth a scarf for Valentine's Day that she already has, he panics and tells her he bought tickets to see singer Jeffrey Osborne.
18	18	"Florida"	John Whitesell	Frank Mula	February 17, 1997	119	17.77
A blizzard convinces Hilton and Ruth to move to Florida. Guest stars: Audrie J. Neenan (Mrs. Balaban), Lynn Cohen (Dorothy), Frank Vincent (Dorothy's husband)
19	19	"Anniversary Waltz"	John Whitesell	Robert Kurtz & Eric Brand	February 24, 1997	120	16.21
Hilton tries to get Ruth's wedding band engraved to renew their wedding vows. Guest stars: Lisa Nicole Carson (Tina), Earle Hyman (Reverend Mitchell), Marc John Jefferies (Davey)
20	20	"That Darn Cat"	John Whitesell	Garfield!	March 3, 1997	122	18.01
Erica moves back to live with Hilton and Ruth, bringing Sherman the cat, while a discarded positive pregnancy test then has everyone jumping to conclusions.
21	21	"I'm OK, You're Hilton"	John Whitesell	Adam Belanoff	March 10, 1997	121	16.51
Hilton has a wonderful time giving advice to his therapy group. Guest stars: Frankie R. Faison (Ron Edwards), Siobhan Fallon (Therapist)
22	22	"The Return of the Charlites"	John Whitesell	Vanessa Middleton	April 28, 1997	124	14.00
Ruth gets a chance to be in the spotlight when her superstar friend comes to town. Special guest star: Patti LaBelle as Charlene
23	23	"My Dinner with Methuselah"	John Whitesell	Elise Allen & Chris Downey	May 5, 1997	123	13.09
Ruth arranges a blind date for Pauline, while Hilton advises Griffin about impressing his sophisticated girlfriend. Guest star: Peter Jacobson (Richard) Featuring: Red Buttons (Otto Tibbles)
24	24	"Hilton's Playland"	John Whitesell	Story by : Nina Combs; Teleplay by : Richard Goodman & Jacqueline R. McKinley	May 12, 1997	125	13.91
Erica's TV-producer boyfriend regrets giving Hilton a job on a children's show. Special guest star: Tim Conway (Happy Clock – Happy)
25	25	"Social Insecurity"	John Whitesell	Vanessa Middleton	May 19, 1997	110	14.72
Hilton must correct Social Security's notion that he is dead. Guest stars: Marcia Jean Kurtz (Social Security clerk), James F. Murtaugh (Mr. Benjamin), Keith Smith (Mr. Brathwaite), Robert Stanton (Mr. Acker)

=== Season 2 (1997–1998) ===
No. overall	No. in season	Title	Directed by	Written by	Original release date	Prod. code	Viewers (millions)
26	1	"About My Life"	John Whitesell	David Landsberg	September 15, 1997	201	14.58
Erica and Griffin move into the Lucas household, tensions rise in the house, and a preschools opens next door. Guest star: Judy Reyes as Preschool teacher – Miss Reyes
27	2	"Wake Up and Smell the Coffeehouse"	John Whitesell	Robert Kurtz & Eric Brand	September 22, 1997	202	14.40
Hilton brings coffee and cookies to the struggling flower shop and hits pay dirt. Guest star: Stewart Steinberg
28	3	"The Rules"	John Whitesell	Vanessa Middleton	September 29, 1997	203	15.79
When Hilton realizes that Griffin and Erica's friends are taking over his house by watching his television and eating all his food, he decides that if they live in his house, Griffin and Erica will have to live by his rules. Reluctantly, Griffin and Erica agree to abide by Hilton's strict new set of house rules, including Rule #5: thou shall not alloweth men upstairs. So when Erica's boyfriend, Julius (guest star Darryl M. Bell, reprising the role), shows up in her bedroom, Erica attempts to keep it a secret from her father. Meanwhile, Hilton is busy on a mission to kill a stray mouse – although Julius mistakenly believes that he is the target of Hilton's assassination plans.
29	4	"Two Cents"	John Whitesell	Chris Downey	October 6, 1997	205	13.69
When Griffin's non-stop eating starts to get on Hilton's nerves, and Hilton's non-stop opinion-giving begins to get to Griffin, the two challenge each other to a 24-hour contest to see which man has more self-control. Meanwhile, Ruth, Erica and Pauline decide that if they have to put up with the men's nonsense, they are going to have a little fun at their expense. And fun they have as they make Griffin suffer watching them eat a three-course meal of his favorite foods and Hilton agonize as he watches Erica walk out the door for a Las Vegas weekend getaway with Julius!
30	5	"Older and Out"	John Whitesell	Adam Belanoff	October 13, 1997	206	15.02
Hilton is overjoyed when he meets new friends Chuck and Larry and joins their "Older and Out" team, since he's also older and he's "out" keeping busy. Ruth discovers that Chuck is gay, and she mistakenly believes that her husband of more than 30 years may have feelings for a man! Blaming herself for letting the spark go out of the marriage, Ruth sets off to win him back before a surprised Hilton discovers the real meaning of "Older and Out."
31	6	"Lucas Smartypantsicus"	John Whitesell	John Rogers	October 20, 1997	207	15.03
Pauline is absolutely thrilled that after years of being the single friend, she has finally become a couple with her new boyfriend, Gregory, a self-absorbed, self-proclaimed genius who disturbs Hilton. So when she decides to dump him because he's too uptight, Ruth thinks that Hilton is really the one to blame and sends him off to remedy the situation. But when Hilton, Griffin and Gregory team up at The Steinway Street Pub, they end up good buddies, and big, big winners too, in a trivia game.
32	7	"The Last Man Standing"	John Whitesell	Tom Purcell & Tyrone Finch	October 27, 1997	204	16.39
A doctor places Hilton under strict quarantine after he catches the stomach flu. Griffin warns Hilton not to escape quarantine, but he doesn't listen and, one by one, everyone in the household drops, leaving Hilton to don his nurse's uniform. As he runs from sickbed to sickbed tending to his patients' needs, Hilton discovers that the members of his household are not at their best when they are sick – but he's determined to maintain his excellent bedside manner.
33	8	"Dating Games"	John Whitesell	Charleen Easton	November 3, 1997	208	16.31
Ruth's obnoxious sister-in-law Debra (Debbie Allen) brags continually about her daughter's wedding plans. Guest stars: Debbie Allen, Busta Rhymes, Rhonda Ross Kendrick, Dean Irby, Scott Lawrence
34	9	"The Pilot (Not the Pilot)"	John Whitesell	Saul Turteltaub & Bernie Orenstein	November 10, 1997	209	16.13
Hilton and Griffin find themselves aboard a plane with a deranged passenger (William Shatner).
35	10	"Lucas Raymondicus"	Don Scardino	John Rogers	November 17, 1997	210	15.31
In a crossover with Everybody Loves Raymond, Frank Barone (Peter Boyle) has been telling his son Ray Barone (Ray Romano) about sinking the winning shot in the 1955 Queens championship since the day he was born. So when Frank pleads with Hilton to help him save face with his son by lying for him, Hilton reluctantly agrees. But then Gwendolyn Brooks High plans a ceremony honoring Frank – and he tells the school that Hilton can't come because he is dead – Hilton decides that enough is enough and goes forward to set the record straight.
36	11	"Shall We Dance?"	Don Scardino	Tom Purcell & Tyrone Finch	November 24, 1997	211	15.38
Ruth gives reluctant Hilton tap-dancing lessons for his birthday.
37	12	"The Two Hilton Lucases"	John Whitesell	Chris Downey	December 15, 1997	213	14.05
Hilton and Griffin get jobs as telemarketers, hoping to win a fabulous office prize, a weekend for two at The Plaza Hotel in Manhattan. Hilton is afraid to tell his wife, knowing she will disapprove of his new job. Instead, he lies and claims that his new job is driving Danny Aiello's limo. Griffin tries to improve his sales record by taking Hilton's advice to create a new persona – he pretends to be Hilton. So when Ruthie overhears "Hilton Lucas" on a sexy phone call, she thinks that her husband is having an affair and blames the whole thing on his new employer, Aiello.
38	13	"A Team of His Own"	John Bowab	Charleen Easton	January 5, 1998	214	15.58
Hilton and Ruth coach opposing basketball teams.
39	14	"Brazil"	Don Scardino	Robert Kurtz & Eric Brand	January 12, 1998	212	14.47
When the city closes down the Flower Cafe because of a misplaced vent, Pauline suggests that she and Ruth indulge in a pampering weekend at a spa. Hilton's only assignment while she's gone is to get the vent fixed. Carla. the chaperone of a Brazilian girls' choir, asks to rent out the coffee shop for a small get-together, and Hilton hesitantly agrees. After all, Pauline and Ruth are out of town and what could possibly go wrong?
40	15	"Old Yeller"	John Bowab	Vanessa Middleton	January 19, 1998	215	14.90
Despite Ruth's insistence that family and friends should never work together, Hilton goes to work for Griffin narrating children's stories. He just can't refuse the temptation for some creative rewriting, and Hilton puts his own spin on some classic kids' tales. Will he have his poetic license revoked? Meanwhile, Pauline is so captivated by the handsome young man temporarily working at the coffee shop that she can't bring herself to fire him.
41	16	"Out to Launch"	Don Scardino	Saul Turteltaub & Bernie Orenstein	February 2, 1998	217	14.40
Hilton is bequeathed a boat by a wealthy man he once helped at the airport. Despite Ruth's insistence that he doesn't have the stamina or the money to support a boating hobby, Hilton persists – including spending three days on the boat with Griffin, parked outside the house in the freezing cold.
42	17	"Fifteen Minutes of Fame"	Don Scardino	David Landsberg	February 23, 1998	218	14.29
While Hilton is working at the coffee house, he meets Rob Burnett and Paul Shaffer from the Late Show with David Letterman. He talks them into letting him be on the show.
43	18	"Mud"	Don Scardino	David Blum	March 2, 1998	219	15.44
A plate that Hilton made as a gift for Ruth has been switched for one made by a famous abstract artist. It is worth some $15,000, and now, thanks to Pauline, it is missing.
44	19	"Enter Lucas"	Don Scardino	Adam Belanoff	March 9, 1998	216	14.42
Pauline tries her hand at playwriting for a course she's taking at the community center. Following Hilton's advice about writing about something "real," she turns out a thinly-disguised comedy about the Lucas family. Hilton is the only one who can't see who the lead character is based on – until he volunteers to play the part on stage. Broadway veteran Philip Bosco is Pauline's flamboyant playwriting teacher, who casts Hilton in her comedy as a sarcastic, irascible coot.
45	20	"1040 Not-So-EZ"	Don Scardino	Temi Akinyemi	April 6, 1998	221	12.33
It's April 15th and Hilton hasn't even started working on his taxes, a fact he wants to make sure Ruth doesn't discover. Ruth has other things on her mind, however – she and Pauline have an appointment with Mr. Rollins of the SBA to obtain another loan for the Flower Café. At the Café, Erica has agreed to look after Jurnee, her friend's younger sister. A desperate Hilton arrives and asks Erica for help with his taxes, but she reminds him she's a lawyer, not an accountant. Meanwhile, Mr. Rollins, very negative and skeptical, says he needs to see Ruth's and Pauline's personal tax returns before they can proceed. Ruth calls Hilton for their tax information, and he promises to get everything to her in an hour. Erica sends Jurnee over to the house to watch TV, where it shortly becomes clear that the little girl knows more about doing taxes (her dad's an accountant) than Hilton. She gets the taxes wrapped up and over to Ruth, Pauline and Mr. Rollins, and Hilton is saved.
46	21	"Men Are from Mars Women Are from Astoria"	Arthur Lewis	Vanessa Middleton & John Rogers	April 27, 1998	222	12.65
Erica and her girlfriends, unable to find "Mr. Right," take Ruth's advice about changing their dating habits and set out on "The Great American Manhunt." As the girls despair about their single state, Ruth tries to explain that men are like old cars – you've just got to find one that works, and if you take care of it long enough, eventually it will be worth something! Taking her advice, the ladies set out in search of the guy least likely to turn into a lemon.
47	22	"On the Rocks"	Don Scardino	Norman Steinberg	May 4, 1998	223	10.92
When Ruth and Hilton have a major fight they assess the changes in their lives.
48	23	"Love Intervention"	Don Scardino	Chris Downey	May 11, 1998	224	11.66
The Lucases play cupid for smitten Griffin.
49	24	"The First Gentleman"	Don Scardino	Tyrone Finch & Tom Purcell	May 18, 1998	220	10.95
Ruth is President of the Businessmen's Roundtable, and Hilton the Ladies auxiliary. In a rather surreal cold open, Hilton speaks with a long dead Jack Benny via special effects. Note: Tony Bennett also appears in this episode.

=== Season 3 (1998–1999) ===
No. overall	No. in season	Title	Directed by	Written by	Original release date	Prod. code	Viewers (millions)
50	1	"Now Is the Time, the Walrus Said"	Don Scardino	Tom Straw	September 21, 1998	301	12.62
Hilton's new responsibility, looking after 11-year-old Jurnee while her dad is at work, becomes a little too hot to handle when Jurnee asks him a complicated question about the birds and bees. Not wanting to interfere in Jurnee's upbringing, and looking for a way to avoid having to answer himself, Hilton suggests that the curious Jurnee go to her dad for an explanation. No matter how difficult it is for Del to face the fact that Jurnee is growing up (perhaps a bit faster than he had hoped), with coaching from Hilton, he finally appears ready to have 'the talk.'
51	2	"Do Not Overheat"	Don Scardino	Dan Wilcox	September 28, 1998	302	12.85
Griffin and Erica work out a financial deal to move into Griffin's house on a landlord-tenant basis – thus giving Hilton and Ruth back their privacy ? only to have Griffin's house accidentally burn to the ground. Hilton's visions of spending romantic evenings alone with Ruth are over before they've even begun. And, when Erica and Griffin realize that everything destroyed in the fire was either borrowed, rented or on loan, they decide it's time to grow up and start taking "ownership" of their lives.
52	3	"Chemistry"	Don Scardino	Adam Belanoff	October 5, 1998	304	12.43
Hilton is devastated to learn that Erica is breaking up with her latest boyfriend, Gil (David Alan Grier) – a handsome, well-educated jazz musician who is everything that Hilton could ever want in a guy and more. When Erica and Gil mutually decide to call it quits, it is Hilton who takes the news the hardest, since he has developed his own meaningful relationship with Gil – primarily because he represents the jazzman Hilton always wanted to be. How will Hilton go on? All he does is sit by the phone and wait for Gil to call! It's true that break-ups can be hard – but usually for the two people involved.
53	4	"Lucas Discordia"	Don Scardino	John Rogers	October 12, 1998	303	11.99
Petty differences about irritating personal habits threaten to escalate into a major brawl when Ruth and Pauline plan a "girls' night out" in Manhattan, and Hilton insists on acting as their chauffeur.
54	5	"The Greatest Gift"	Don Scardino	Vanessa Middleton	October 19, 1998	305	12.80
A major argument erupts when Ruth accidentally discovers that Erica has been hiding all the gifts she has given her over the years. When Ruth confronts Erica about only pretending to like the gifts that Ruth put so much time and care into buying, it sparks the disagreement. On the one hand, Ruth feels that she does not know her own daughter, and on the flip side, Erica feels that her mother doesn't bother to learn about her likes and dislikes. Although Hilton desperately wants to stay out of their argument, he is left with no alternative and attempts to coerce the women into a joint shopping trip. The goal – buy something that is pleasing to them both without driving him over the edge.
55	6	"Lucas Matriculus"	Don Scardino	John Rogers	October 26, 1998	307	14.11
When Griffin accompanies Hilton to "Grandparents Day" at Jurnee's school and adds his two cents to the science lesson, it quickly becomes apparent that he is a natural at teaching and holding the kids' interest. Who would have thought?? Hilton is thrilled that Griffin has uncovered a talent for this most noble profession, while Erica is more than ticked off when she learns that Griffin achieved a higher GPA than she did in college. At first resistant to the idea of working hard for little pay and loads of responsibility, Griffin is ultimately swept up with the idea of molding the minds of America's young – heaven help them.
56	7	"Playground Scar"	Don Scardino	Tom Reeder	November 2, 1998	308	13.61
After Jurnee expresses her fondness for schoolmate Kevin and he retaliates by shoving her on the school playground, amateur psychologist Hilton explains his theory of how "playground scarring" can affect a woman for life. According to Hilton, when women are unable to trust, unable to commit, their problems can always be traced back to a bad playground experience when they were deeply humiliated by a boy they liked. To this day, Ruth has problems with trust because of a certain Kenneth P. Watson, who purposely teetered when he should have tottered, requiring a young Ruth to get stitches. When it comes to Jurnee, however, Hilton is determined not to have history repeat itself.
57	8	"The Episode Episode"	Don Scardino	Adam Belanoff	November 9, 1998	309	13.72
Hilton is sentenced to a life without pork chops, barbecue ribs and bacon when a doctor's visit reveals a too-high cholesterol count. A mouth-watering meal for Hilton now consists of tofu, steamed broccoli and "not-wurst" imitation hot dogs. New Jersey Nets player Jayson Williams guest stars as Jurnee's teacher, who adds his two-cents on the subject of Hilton's eating habits.
58	9	"Judgment Day"	Don Scardino	Tom Purcell & Tyrone Finch	November 16, 1998	306	14.73
Hilton's steaming when a klutzy customer spills coffee on her dress, admits it's her own fault – and then sues the Flower Cafe for $3,000. Guest star: Kevin James makes a cameo appearance as Doug Heffernan, from the sitcom The King of Queens.
59	10	"Turkey Day"	Don Scardino	Dan Wilcox	November 23, 1998	311	14.25
When Hilton offers to make Jurnee's Thanksgiving Day Parade turkey costume from scratch, it comes out to be just that... a turkey of a costume. So imagine Hilton's joy when the queen of domesticity, Martha Stewart, shows up at the coffee shop bearing the most realistic looking turkey outfit that anyone's ever seen and leaves it behind by mistake. But, when Martha returns asking if anyone has seen the costume, will Hilton's guilt get the best of him... or will Jurnee be the best-dressed turkey in the parade?
60	11	"This Old Friend"	Don Scardino	Tom Purcell & Tyrone Finch	December 14, 1998	310	13.90
Hilton becomes nervous when, after a two-year silence, he hears from an old friend who only makes contact when he needs a handout.
61	12	"The Awful Truth"	Don Scardino	Vanessa Middleton	January 11, 1999	312	14.83
Del's new girlfriend, Karen, agonizes over a secret that she is worried about sharing with him: the youth who passes as her kid brother is actually her son.
62	13	"Refrigerator Logic"	Don Scardino	Tom Purcell & Tyrone Finch	January 18, 1999	313	15.20
Hilton is beyond frustrated when his newly purchased state-of-the-art refrigerator breaks down and he can't get any customer satisfaction. His repeated attempts to reach a human customer service representative fail, and then he's told it will take an eternity to get the necessary refrigerator part. Hilton takes matters into his own hands and becomes a one-man consumer crusader.
63	14	"Lucas Absentia"	Don Scardino	J.J. Paulsen & John Rogers	January 25, 1999	314	13.05
Griffin contemplates quitting the teaching profession when his first day as a substitute teacher is a disaster. The Lucases lend themselves out as mock students so that Griffin can practice his teaching techniques on them – although their misguided attempt to help might just turn him off teaching forever.
64	15	"False Alarm"	Don Scardino	Mark Legan	February 1, 1999	316	12.90
After the Lucas home is burglarized, Hilton invests in a security system – only to discover that the thief is someone he knows.
65	16	"A Very Nice Dance"	Don Scardino	J.J. Paulsen	February 8, 1999	317	11.89
Hilton and Ruth recall their first date many years ago. Their flashbacks are done through animated sequences, and of course, both of them have widely different versions of what happened.
66	17	"Ol' Betsy"	Don Scardino	Nick LeRose	February 15, 1999	315	13.20
While searching for a rare part for his beloved turntable, Hilton bumps into an old friend from his bachelor days, Fred. When Hilton and Fred start reminiscing about how they double-dated sisters Mattie and Roberta Singleton, Hilton decides to play matchmaker and prompts Fred into learning whatever became of Mattie. Even now, years later, Fred can't help wondering what might have happened if they remained a couple... and, thanks to Hilton, he may finally get a chance to find out.
67	18	"Afterschool Delight"	Don Scardino	Adam Belanoff, Tom Purcell & Tyrone Finch	February 22, 1999	318	12.40
Jurnee is aghast when she finds out that her dad intends to date the "meanest" teacher at her school. Del is so troubled by Jurnee's reaction to his interest in Ms. Malone that he is ready to call off their date. But Hilton reminds him that almost every person can remember a teacher who was too strict, gave too much homework or expected too much of a student – and usually ended up being the one who made the greatest impact on the student later in life.
68	19	"Will Power"	Don Scardino	Dan Wilcox	March 1, 1999	319	11.52
Hilton is attempting to help Jurnee with her "Romeo and Juliet" homework assignment when his true feelings about The Bard come out: Why couldn't Shakespeare simply speak in plain English rather than using all of that fancy, confusing language? Alas, Shakespeare showeth up in the Lucas kitchen to tutor Hilton personally. Will it be "all's well that ends well?"
69	20	"Lucas Illuminus"	Don Scardino	John Rogers	March 17, 1999	320	8.44
Hilton volunteers as a reader for a retired, blind English literature professor and, upon realizing his gift for teaching, urges him to return to the classroom. Guest star: Anthony Quinn as Professor Christo, whose failing eyesight and advanced age caused him to leave behind the profession he loves so much.
70	21	"Timerity"	Don Scardino	Tom Straw	April 5, 1999	322	11.07
Hilton is caught in the middle when his curmudgeonly friend, Tim, stages a rent strike against his landlord.
71	22	"The Party's Over"	Don Scardino	Vanessa Middleton	April 26, 1999	321	10.91
Hilton is stunned when 11-year-old Jurnee, left in his care while her father is away, returns from a friend's birthday party drunk. Hilton and Ruth are adamant about finding out who spiked the birthday punch and caused several of the children to awaken to wicked hangovers the following morning. But, Jurnee is not budging for fear that she will be labeled a squealer among her friends. Hilton is determined to make Jurnee understand that protecting the guilty person is sometimes just as bad as being guilty yourself.
72	23	"The Vesey Method"	Don Scardino	Bill Boulware	May 3, 1999	323	11.62
When Griffin finds himself face to face with the group of tough, unmotivated students, he struggles to find a way to reach them and open their minds to the wonders of learning – something fellow teacher Mr. Fleming lost enthusiasm for a long time ago.
73	24	"He Who Hesitates Is Lucas"	Don Scardino	Nick LeRose	May 10, 1999	325	11.43
When Hilton and Ruth hear that their "little girl" is getting married, they couldn't be happier for her, or themselves, since this would mean one less person in their crowded house. Erica's intentions, however, are for the newlyweds to remain in her parents’ house indefinitely to save some money. Are Hilton's tears of joy or sorrow?
74	25	"War Stories"	Don Scardino	Tom Reeder	May 17, 1999	324	10.56
Griffin's trust in his new girlfriend Anita is put to the test when her job as a conference planner puts her smack in the middle of a young millionaires' convention, on the season finale. Rather than heeding Hilton's advice to give Anita some space, Griffin decides to pop in on the convention and find out for himself how loyal Anita is – which prompts Hilton to reminisce about the anxious time he spent away from Ruth, soon after they first met, agonizing over whether or not she was thinking of him as often as he was of her. "Prequel Monday" kicks off with an animated flashback sequence of Hilton as an enlisted Navy man.

=== Season 4 (1999–2000) ===
No. overall	No. in season	Title	Directed by	Written by	Original release date	Prod. code	Viewers (millions)
75	1	"My Spy"	Don Scardino	Tom Straw	September 29, 1999	401	9.86
Hilton falls asleep during an I Spy marathon. He dreams that he and his old partner Kelly Robinson have been put on a new case in Hong Kong. However, Erica keeps interrupting Hilton's dream to discuss her wedding preparations. The rest of the cast play parts in the dream.
76	2	"The Wedding"	Don Scardino	Nick LeRose	October 6, 1999	402	9.96
Hilton has to pay the wedding organizers for their services as Erica's wedding nears, but Ruth is more concerned with why the bride is not falling apart yet.
77	3	"Book 'Em, Griff O"	Don Scardino	J.J. Paulsen	October 13, 1999	403	8.53
Hilton urges Griffin to do something to replace his school's outdated textbooks, and Erica and Darien return from their honeymoon.
78	4	"Lucas Apocalypse"	Don Scardino	John Rogers	October 20, 1999	406	9.10
When Griffin tries to prepare for Y2K by installing a generator, he causes a premature blackout for the entire neighborhood.
79	5	"A Teacher's Life"	Don Scardino	Matt Karis	October 27, 1999	405	8.67
Getting through a typical day is hard enough, but it becomes an ordeal for Griffin when everyone demands his time on the day he is preparing for a date with a beautiful flight attendant.
80	6	"There's Something About Hilton"	Don Scardino	Nick LeRose	November 3, 1999	407	9.92
A strange woman comes to the shop under the impression that Hilton is her husband, Charlie.
81	7	"Superstar"	Don Scardino	Nick LeRose & Tom Reeder	November 17, 1999	410	8.67
82	8	"Superstar"	Don Scardino	Nick LeRose & Tom Reeder	November 17, 1999	411	8.67
Griffin has a dream in which teachers are given the same elite status and salary as professional athletes or actors.
83	9	"The Parent Trap"	Don Scardino	Matt Karis	December 15, 1999	408	8.92
Erica visits a student's home to get his mother more involved in his education. Guest stars: Rufus Read, Anne O'Sullivan
84	10	"One for the Books"	Don Scardino	Tom Reeder	December 22, 1999	404	8.56
Ruth and Pauline try to help save a friend's failing bookstore by annexing it to the Flower Cafe.
85	11	"Loving Madeline"	John Whitesell	J.J. Paulsen	December 29, 1999	415	11.35
The cast presents a heartfelt tribute to Madeline Kahn, with clips highlighting her character Pauline Fox.
86	12	"The Hilton Hilton"	John Whitesell	Kriss Turner	January 14, 2000	414	9.30
Darien's late arrival to an important family dinner causes a fight between Hilton and Ruth.
87	13	"Chilly Scenes of Winter Golf"	Don Scardino	Tom Purcell & Tyrone Fitch	January 21, 2000	412	8.25
When Ruth teaches Erica how to play golf, a rivalry begins between the two women that even extends to cooking.
88	14	"To Catch a Thief"	Don Scardino	Matt Karis & Becky Mode	January 28, 2000	413	8.50
Hilton finds himself in the middle of a bank heist.
89	15	"Raising Paranoia"	Don Scardino	Tom Straw	March 3, 2000	409	7.54
Griffin, Erica and Darien try to convince a drug-addicted friend to enter rehab.
90	16	"It's a Wonderful Wife"	John Whitesell	Story by : Tom Straw; Teleplay by : Tom Reeder	March 10, 2000	416	6.86
For a school paper, Keisha discovers intriguing facts about Ruth's past.
91	17	"Perfect Valentine"	John Whitesell	Karen Maser	March 31, 2000	417	7.03
Griffin's inability to deal with the return of his estranged father, who abandoned him 15 years earlier, causes problems in his relationship with Rebecca.
92	18	"A Pair of Threes Beats a Flush Every Time"	Don Scardino	Tom Straw	April 7, 2000	418	6.71
Hilton discovers that a former high school buddy is now homeless.
93	19	"Thursday's Child"	John Whitesell	Tom Purcell & Tyrone Finch	April 14, 2000	421	4.09
A foster child in Erica's class wants to move in with the Lucases.
94	20	"Kids Eat the Darndest Things"	John Whitesell	Kriss Turner	April 14, 2000	420	4.3
Griffin tries to encourage both his students and the Lucases to eat healthier foods.
95	21	"A Long Night's Journey"	Don Scardino	Sean Francis	April 21, 2000	419	6.70
Hilton suffers from insomnia for several days, falling asleep during the day at inopportune moments, causing Erica and Ruth embarrassment. When Hilton refuses to attend a sleep clinic, Griffin offers to set up a video camera in the Lucas' bedroom to record the night's activity to find the cause of Hilton's sleeplessness. The next morning, when the family gathers to watch the tape, no one is more surprised than Ruth to see that it is her snoring and kicking Hilton in her sleep that keeps him awake.
96	22	"The Song Remains the Same"	Don Scardino	Nick LeRose	April 28, 2000	422	7.52
Hilton passes his advice along to Erica and Darien on how to keep the romance alive in marriage.
