= Nicholas Sadler =

American actor, director, writer and producer

- Born: February 9, 1967 (age 59); Minneapolis, Minnesota
- Occupation: Actor
- Years active: 1989–present
- Spouse: Gigi New (m. 2003)
- Children: 1

Nicholas Sadler (born February 9, 1967) is an American actor.

== Career ==
Sadler had roles in Stephen King's Sometimes They Come Back and as Mad Dog Coll in Mobsters. He has had roles in films including Disclosure, Twister, Scent of a Woman, and Hellraiser: Inferno.

In 1998, Sadler wrote and directed the short film Jesus Tells A Joke. It premiered at the Hamptons International Film Festival and went on to screen at festivals around the world, including Slamdance, Denver, and Deauville.

In 2002, Sadler was the creative consultant for the Ray Romano documentary 95 Miles to Go, directed by Tom Caltabiano (producer of Everybody Loves Raymond).

== Personal life ==
Sadler has been married to Gigi New since 2003. Together they have a son, named Cooper.

== Filmography ==
=== Film and television ===
- ABC Afterschool Specials (1989, TV series) - Billy Dryer
- The Cosby Show (1990, TV series) - Thief
- Sometimes They Come Back (1991, TV movie) - Vinnie Vincent
- Mobsters (1991) - Mad Dog Coll
- Stop! Or My Mom Will Shoot (1992) - Suicide
- Scent of a Woman (1992) - Harry Havemeyer
- Acting on Impulse (1993) - Tommy
- Disclosure (1994) - Don Cherry
- Earth 2 (1995, TV series) - Max
- Sawbones (1995, TV movie) - Brad Fraser
- The Last Supper (1995) - Homeless Basher
- Fallen Angels (1995, TV series) - Al
- Frank and Jesse (1995) - Arch Clements
- The Method (1996) - Jack
- Twister (1996) - Kubrick
- Nightwatch (1997) - Theater Director (uncredited)
- ER (1997, TV series) - Ricky Melgato
- Spoiler (1998) - Renny
- Idle Hands (1999) - Ruck
- Turkey. Cake. (1999, short) - Rob
- Good vs. Evil (1999–2000, TV series) - Luis Rivera
- Civilty (2000) - Joe McPhillips
- Hellraiser: Inferno (2000) - Bernie
- Desperate But Not Serious (2000) - Jonathan Gold
- CSI: Crime Scene Investigation (2002, TV series) - Dwight Kelso
- Charmed (2003, TV series) - Leech
- In Justice (2006, TV series) - Larry Duffy
- Men of a Certain Age (2010, TV series) - Repairman
- Fair Game (2010) - CIA Tour Leader
- True Grit (2010) - Repentant Condemned Man
- Harold's Bad Day (2012, Short) - Marty
- The Bye Bye Man (2017) - Professor Cooper
- Paterno (2018, TV movie) - Todd

=== Production credits ===
- Jesus Takes a Joke (1998) (director, writer and producer)
- 95 Miles to Go (2002) (creative consultant)
