= 2027 in Indiana =

- Decades: 2000s; 2010s; 2020s
- See also: History of Indiana; Historical outline of Indiana; List of years in Indiana; 2027 in the United States

The following is a list of events of the year 2027 in Indiana.

== Events ==
=== Planned or predicted ===
- November 2 - 2027 Indianapolis mayoral election
