= 2023 in Indiana =

- Decades: 2000s; 2010s; 2020s
- See also: History of Indiana; Historical outline of Indiana; List of years in Indiana; 2023 in the United States

The following is a list of events of the year 2023 in Indiana.

== Incumbents ==
=== State government ===
- Governor: Eric Holcomb (R)

== Events ==
- April 11 – Richmond, Indiana facility fire: A massive fire at a recycling plant in Richmond sends plumes of toxic smoke into the air and forces the evacuation of about 2,000 people in a half-mile radius of the fire.
- May 28 – Two-time series champion Josef Newgarden wins the 107th Indianapolis 500.
- June 25 – One person is killed after a tornado strikes Martin County.
- November 6 – A woman is arrested after ramming her car into a Black Hebrew Israelite school in Indianapolis, mistakenly believing it to be an "Israel school."

== See also ==
- 2023 in the United States
