= Arcaro =

Arcaro is an Italian surname. Notable people with the surname include:

- Eddie Arcaro (1916–1997), American jockey
- Flavia Arcaro (1876–1937), American actress
- Vincent Arcaro (born 1953), American film, television, and commercial producer
