= Inside Comedy =

American interview TV program

- Created by: David Steinberg
- Presented by: David Steinberg
- Country of origin: United States
- Original language: English
- No. of seasons: 4
- No. of episodes: 36

Production
- Executive producers: David Steinberg; Steve Carell; Vance DeGeneres; Charlie Hartsock
- Running time: 30 minutes
- Production companies: Carousel Productions; Sunset Point Productions; Showtime Networks

Original release
- Network: Showtime
- Release: January 26, 2012 – June 9, 2015

Inside Comedy is an American television interview program on Showtime hosted and directed by David Steinberg. During each episode, Steinberg interviews popular comedians from the worlds of stand-up, television, and film, showing clips from their careers. The show's first season ran from January 26 to March 29, 2012. Its second season premiered on February 11, 2013, and ended on April 15, 2013. The third season aired from February 3 to April 7, 2014. The first three seasons each consisted of 10 episodes. The fourth season had six episodes, premiering May 5, 2015, and ending June 9.

== Production ==
Inside Comedy was initially intended as a feature-length documentary to be produced by Steve Carell and interviewer David Steinberg. Steinberg and Carell's company, Carousel Productions, raised several million dollars and began filming interviews. After it was decided that too much footage was shot for one film, the project was picked up as a television series by the Showtime cable TV network.

== Episodes ==
Season	Episodes	Originally released	
Season	Episodes	First released	Last released
1	10	January 26, 2012	March 30, 2012
2	10	February 11, 2013	April 15, 2013
3	10	February 3, 2014	April 7, 2014
4	6	May 5, 2015	June 9, 2015

=== Season 1 (2012) ===
No. overall	No. in series	Guest(s)	Original release date
1	1	Don Rickles & Jerry Seinfeld	January 26, 2012
2	2	Chris Rock	February 2, 2012
3	3	Steve Carell & Jane Lynch	February 9, 2012
4	4	Billy Crystal, Martin Short, & Brad Garrett	February 16, 2012
5	5	Larry David	February 23, 2012
6	6	Sarah Silverman & Garry Shandling	March 2, 2012
7	7	Mel Brooks & Carl Reiner	March 9, 2012
8	8	Ellen DeGeneres & Tim Conway	March 16, 2012
9	9	Kathy Griffin & Steven Wright	March 23, 2012
10	10	Robin Williams & Jonathan Winters	March 30, 2012

=== Season 2 (2013) ===
No. overall	No. in series	Guest(s)	Original release date
11	1	Louis C.K. & Bob Newhart	February 11, 2013
12	2	Judd Apatow & Tina Fey	February 18, 2013
13	3	Drew Carey & Martin Mull	February 25, 2013
14	4	Steve Martin & Lily Tomlin	March 4, 2013
15	5	Jim Carrey & Keenen Ivory Wayans	March 11, 2013
16	6	Will Ferrell & Betty White	March 18, 2013
17	7	Susie Essman & Carol Burnett	March 25, 2013
18	8	Ben Stiller & Mike Myers	April 1, 2013
19	9	Robert Klein & Bill Maher	April 8, 2013
20	10	Robert Schimmel	April 15, 2013

=== Season 3 (2014) ===
No. overall	No. in series	Guest(s)	Original release date
21	1	Jimmy Fallon & Zach Galifianakis	February 3, 2014
22	2	Alan Arkin & Jonah Hill	February 10, 2014
23	3	Bette Midler & Richard Belzer	February 17, 2014
24	4	Andrew Dice Clay & Kevin Nealon	February 24, 2014
25	5	Bob Einstein & Eric Idle	March 3, 2014
26	6	Julia Louis-Dreyfus & Dick Van Dyke	March 10, 2014
27	7	Garry Marshall, Keegan-Michael Key & Jordan Peele	March 17, 2014
28	8	Richard Lewis & Gilbert Gottfried	March 24, 2014
29	9	Fred Willard & Catherine O'Hara	March 31, 2014
30	10	Kevin Pollak, Bob Saget, & Larry Miller	April 7, 2014

=== Season 4 (2015) ===
No. overall	No. in series	Guest(s)	Original release date
31	1	Stephen Colbert & Jon Stewart	May 5, 2015
32	2	Michael Keaton & Dan Aykroyd	May 12, 2015
33	3	Bryan Cranston & Carol Leifer	May 19, 2015
34	4	Ted Danson & Wanda Sykes	May 26, 2015
35	5	Cheech & Chong (Cheech Marin and Tommy Chong) & Dane Cook	June 2, 2015
36	6	Conan O'Brien & Jeffrey Tambor	June 9, 2015

Steinberg has also filmed interviews with Stephen Fry, Bonnie Hunt, David Koechner, Jon Lovitz, Kathy Najimy, Paula Poundstone, and Tommy Smothers.

== Reception ==
The show's first season garnered generally positive reviews from critics. Nancy deWolf Smith of The Wall Street Journal praised Steinberg for his interviewing: "He does not focus on himself but is exquisitely tuned in to his subjects, many of whom he knows well. This seems to have relaxed some of his guests to the point where they appear more natural, and less switched on—as entertaining as that can be—than they are with other interviewers." Eric Gould of The Phoenix commented that "Steinberg's sly, understated style gave us a brilliant glimpse into comedy minds put on the spot, and artists at the top of the heap."

Neil Genzlinger of The New York Times applauded the editing exhibited in the show's premiere episode: "Mr. Seinfeld and Mr. Rickles are interviewed separately, and what makes the episode so satisfying is the way their interviews are spliced together and enhanced with clips."

At the outset of the show's second season, Don Steinberg of The Wall Street Journal commended the host's talent for interviewing: "Mr. Steinberg has an easy rapport with subjects. He stays out of their way as they jump to the good stuff, the things you imagine comedy people talk to other comedy people about."

== See also ==
- Sit Down Comedy with David Steinberg, an early and similarly-formatted TV Land series also produced and hosted by Steinberg
