= Hope & Gloria =

Television series

- Genre: Sitcom
- Created by: Bill Steinkellner; Cheri Steinkellner
- Starring: Cynthia Stevenson; Jessica Lundy; Enrico Colantoni; Robert Garrova; Alan Thicke; Taylor Negron
- Opening theme: "Thank God for a Friend Like You" performed by Wild Orchid
- Composer: Craig Safan
- Country of origin: United States
- Original language: English
- No. of seasons: 2
- No. of episodes: 35

Production
- Executive producers: Jeanette Collins; Mimi Friedman; Bill Steinkellner; Cherie Steinkellner
- Producers: Stephen C. Grossman; J. J. Paulsen
- Production locations: Pittsburgh and Los Angeles
- Camera setup: Multi-camera
- Running time: 30 minutes
- Production companies: Team Steinkellner Productions; Warner Bros. Television

Original release
- Network: NBC
- Release: March 9, 1995 – June 22, 1996

Hope & Gloria is an American sitcom television series created by Bill and Cheri Steinkellner, that aired on NBC from March 9, 1995, through June 22, 1996. The show was canceled after 35 episodes. It starred Cynthia Stevenson as Hope, a high-strung television producer, and Jessica Lundy as Gloria, a tough-talking beautician, who become neighbors in an apartment complex in downtown Pittsburgh. The program also starred Alan Thicke as a local TV personality and featured Enrico Colantoni in one of his first regular roles on television.

The series was broadcast in Britain on ITV during the 1996 summer holiday, going out Monday to Friday for seven weeks.

== Cast ==
- Cynthia Stevenson as Hope Davidson
- Jessica Lundy as Gloria Utz
- Enrico Colantoni as Louis Utz, Gloria's husband
- Robert Garrova as Sonny Utz, Gloria & Louis's son
- Alan Thicke as Dennis Dupree
- Taylor Negron as Gwillem Blatt (season 2)

== Episodes ==
=== Series overview ===
Season	Episodes	Originally released	
Season	Episodes	First released	Last released
1	13	March 9, 1995	September 7, 1995
2	22	September 24, 1995	June 22, 1996

=== Season 1 (1995) ===
No. overall	No. in season	Title	Directed by	Written by	Original release date	Prod. code	Viewers (millions)
1	1	"Are We Having Fun Yet?"	Barnet Kellman	Cheri Steinkellner & Bill Steinkellner	March 9, 1995	456951	22.8
2	2	"No Degrees of Separation"	Peter Bonerz	J.J. Paulsen	March 16, 1995	456953	21.0
3	3	"Salon, It's Been Good to Know You"	Steve Zuckerman	Jerry Perzigian	March 23, 1995	456954	20.1
4	4	"A Fine ROM-ance"	Steve Zuckerman	John Frink & Don Payne	March 30, 1995	456955	22.2
5	5	"Falling in Bed Again"	Peter Bonerz	Jeanette Collins & Mimi Friedman	April 6, 1995	456952	19.4
6	6	"I Never Sang for Our Father"	Peter Bonerz	Rob Des Hotel & Dean Batali	April 13, 1995	456956	16.2
7	7	"My Mamma Done Told Me: Part 1"	Alan Rafkin	Cheri Steinkellner & Bill Steinkellner	April 20, 1995	456957	21.2
8	8	"Who's Poppa?: Part 2"	Peter Baldwin	Cheri Steinkellner & Bill Steinkellner	April 20, 1995	456958	24.9
9	9	"Love with an Improper Stranger"	Alan Rafkin	Jeanette Collins & Mimi Friedman	April 27, 1995	456959	18.8
10	10	"The Face with Two Men"	Alan Rafkin	Jerry Perzigian	May 4, 1995	456960	19.2
11	11	"Sisyphus, Prometheus and Me"	Steve Zuckerman	George McGrath	May 11, 1995	456961	16.1
12	12	"Don't Take Any Wooden Elephants"	Steve Zuckerman	Rob Des Hotel & Dean Batali	August 10, 1995	456963	13.9
13	13	"A Midsummer Night's Trim"	Michael Lembeck	J.J. Paulsen	September 7, 1995	456962	16.8

=== Season 2 (1995–96) ===
No. overall	No. in season	Title	Directed by	Written by	Original release date	Prod. code	Viewers (millions)
14	1	"An Embarrassment of Teapots"	Shelley Jensen	Jeanette Collins & Mimi Friedman	September 24, 1995	457752	18.7
15	2	"Dumb & Smarter"	Michael Lembeck	George McGrath	October 1, 1995	457754	17.0
16	3	"A Star is Reborn"	Shelley Jensen	Janis Hirsch	October 8, 1995	457751	16.8
17	4	"Love is the Afternoon"	Michael Lembeck	Jerry Perzigian	October 29, 1995	457753	15.5
18	5	"Manager and Woman"	Michael Lembeck	Rob Des Hotel & Dean Batali	November 5, 1995	457755	15.1
19	6	"How to Get an Ed in Business"	Peter Baldwin	Rob Des Hotel & Dean Batali	November 12, 1995	457758	15.7
20	7	"Listen, Sister"	Peter Baldwin	J.J. Paulsen	November 19, 1995	457757	13.6
21	8	"Money You Should Mention"	Michael Lembeck	J.J. Paulsen	December 3, 1995	457760	13.9
22	9	"Consenting Adults"	Michael Lembeck	Janis Hirsch	December 10, 1995	457761	12.1
23	10	"The Dupree Family Christmas"	Joanna Kerns	George McGrath	December 17, 1995	457759	12.9
24	11	"Enemies: A Love Story"	Alan Rafkin	Rob Des Hotel & Dean Batali	January 6, 1996	457763	7.3
25	12	"The Man Upstairs"	Michael Lembeck	Jerry Perzigian	January 13, 1996	457762	7.1
26	13	"Danny, Oh Boy"	Alan Rafkin	J.J. Paulsen	January 20, 1996	457764	7.5
27	14	"A New York Story"	Alan Rafkin	George McGrath	February 3, 1996	457767	7.2
28	15	"Tainted Love"	Alan Rafkin	Janis Hirsch	February 10, 1996	457765	5.8
29	16	"One Sorry Mother"	Alan Rafkin	Jeanette Collins & Mimi Friedman	March 16, 1996	457766	7.0
30	17	"A Sentimental Education"	Pamela Fryman	Jerry Perzigian	March 23, 1996	457768	6.2
31	18	"The Art of the Deal"	John Bowab	Arnold Rudnick & Rich Hosek	March 30, 1996	457769	6.4
32	19	"Sit Down, You're Rockin' the Funicular"	Michael Lembeck	Jeanette Collins & Mimi Friedman	April 6, 1996	457772	6.2
33	20	"Note to Self"	Alan Rafkin	Dean Batali & Rob Des Hotel	April 13, 1996	457756	5.9
34	21	"Baby Love"	Alan Rafkin	Janis Hirsh	April 20, 1996	457771	5.2
35	22	"Come Back Lil' Tina"	Pamela Fryman	Marc Peterson	June 22, 1996	457770	4.7

== Notable guest stars ==
- Larry Poindexter as Jeffrey
- Lisa Kudrow as Phoebe Buffay
