= 2025 in Indiana =

- Decades: 2000s; 2010s; 2020s
- See also: History of Indiana; Historical outline of Indiana; List of years in Indiana; 2025 in the United States

The following is a list of events of the year 2025 in Indiana.

== Incumbents ==
=== State government ===
- Governor: Eric Holcomb (R) (until January 13); then Mike Braun (R)

== Events ==
- April 7 – 2025 Southwest United States measles outbreak: The Indiana Department of Health confirms the state's first measles case of 2025.
- May 20 – The state of Indiana executes Benjamin Ritchie by lethal execution at the Indiana State Prison in Michigan City. Ritchie was convicted of killing a police officer in 2000.
- June 30 – Ahead of a state law, six public colleges cut or merge about 400 degree programs, out of 2,200 total state degrees. Among them, the Indiana University system eliminates 249 programs, the Purdue University system 83, and Ball State University 51. Indiana State University, Ivy Tech Community College, and the University of Southern Indiana also cut programs.
- July 5 – Two teenagers are killed and five other people are hospitalized in a mass shooting in Indianapolis.
- August 5 – DHS Secretary Kristi Noem announces parts of the Miami Correctional Facility in Bunker Hill will be converted into an immigration detention center dubbed "The Speedway Slammer".
- October 4 – Former New York Jets quarterback and Fox Sports analyst Mark Sanchez is stabbed during an altercation outside an Indianapolis bar in the early morning. Sanchez is arrested and charged with battery, unlawful entry of a motor vehicle, and public intoxication.
- October 14 – Indiana University Bloomington fires the Indiana Daily Student faculty adviser and eliminates the student newspaper's print edition shortly after the adviser refuses an order to remove all news stories from a homecoming special edition.
- December 5 – The Indiana House approves a congressional map designed to give Republicans all nine of the state's seats.
- December 11 – The Indiana Senate votes against the new congressional map.

=== Sports ===
- February 1 – The Royal Rumble is held at the Lucas Oil Stadium in Indianapolis.
- May 25 – 2025 Indianapolis 500: Alex Palou, of Chip Ganassi Racing, wins the 109th Indianapolis 500.

== Deaths ==
- February 7 – Burke Scott, 92, basketball player and coach (Indiana Hoosiers)

== See also ==
- 2025 in the United States
