= 2026 in Indiana =

- Decades: 2000s; 2010s; 2020s
- See also: History of Indiana; Historical outline of Indiana; List of years in Indiana; 2026 in the United States

The following is a list of events of the year 2026 in Indiana.

== Incumbents ==
=== State government ===
- Governor: Mike Braun (R)

== Events ==
- January 18 – Tippecanoe County Superior Court Judge Steven P. Meyer and his wife Kimberly are shot and injured at their home in Lafayette. Five suspects, one of whom was due in Meyer's courtroom, are arrested on January 22.
- January 19 – The Indiana Hoosiers beat the Miami Hurricanes 27–21 to win the 2026 College Football Playoff National Championship, Indiana's first ever title.
- February 19 – A tornado damages several buildings in the Bloomington area.
- February 23–March 2 – The NFL Scouting Combine is held at the Lucas Oil Stadium in Indianapolis.
- March 10 – Tornados form in Newton County, killing two people.
- April 5 – The 2026 NCAA Division II, Division III, and National Invitation Tournament men's basketball finals are played at the Gainbridge Fieldhouse in Indianapolis. They are won by Gannon, Mary Washington, and Auburn, respectively.
- April 6
  - Several gunshots are fired at the home of Indianapolis City Councilman Ron Gibson, who a week prior had voted in favor of allowing a data center to be built in the city. No injuries are reported. A note reading "NO DATA CENTERS" is left at the scene.
  - The 2026 NCAA Division I men's basketball championship game is held at Lucas Oil Stadium in Indianapolis, in which the Michigan Wolverines beat the UConn Huskies 69–63.
- May 5 – Primaries are held.
- May 24 – Felix Rosenqvist wins the 2026 Indianapolis 500 with a late pass to beat David Malukas.
- May 26 – Ball State University agrees to pay a $225,000 settlement to a former employee who was fired in September 2025 over a Facebook post she made criticizing Charlie Kirk following his assassination.
- June 4 – The Chicago Bears board of directors vote in favor of building a new stadium for the team in Hammond.
- August 14 – Governor Braun requests a Presidential Emergency Declaration following severe flooding in areas near the White River. At least seven people die as a result of floods.
- November 1 – Seven people are injured in a shooting near the Indiana University Bloomington campus.
- November 3 – 2026 Indiana elections:
  - 2026 Indiana Secretary of State election: Beau Bayh wins election, beating Max Engling. Bayh is the first Democrat to be elected to a statewide office since 2012.

== See also ==
- 2026 in the United States
