= David Steinberg =

Canadian comedian, actor, director, and writer (born 1942)

David Steinberg CM
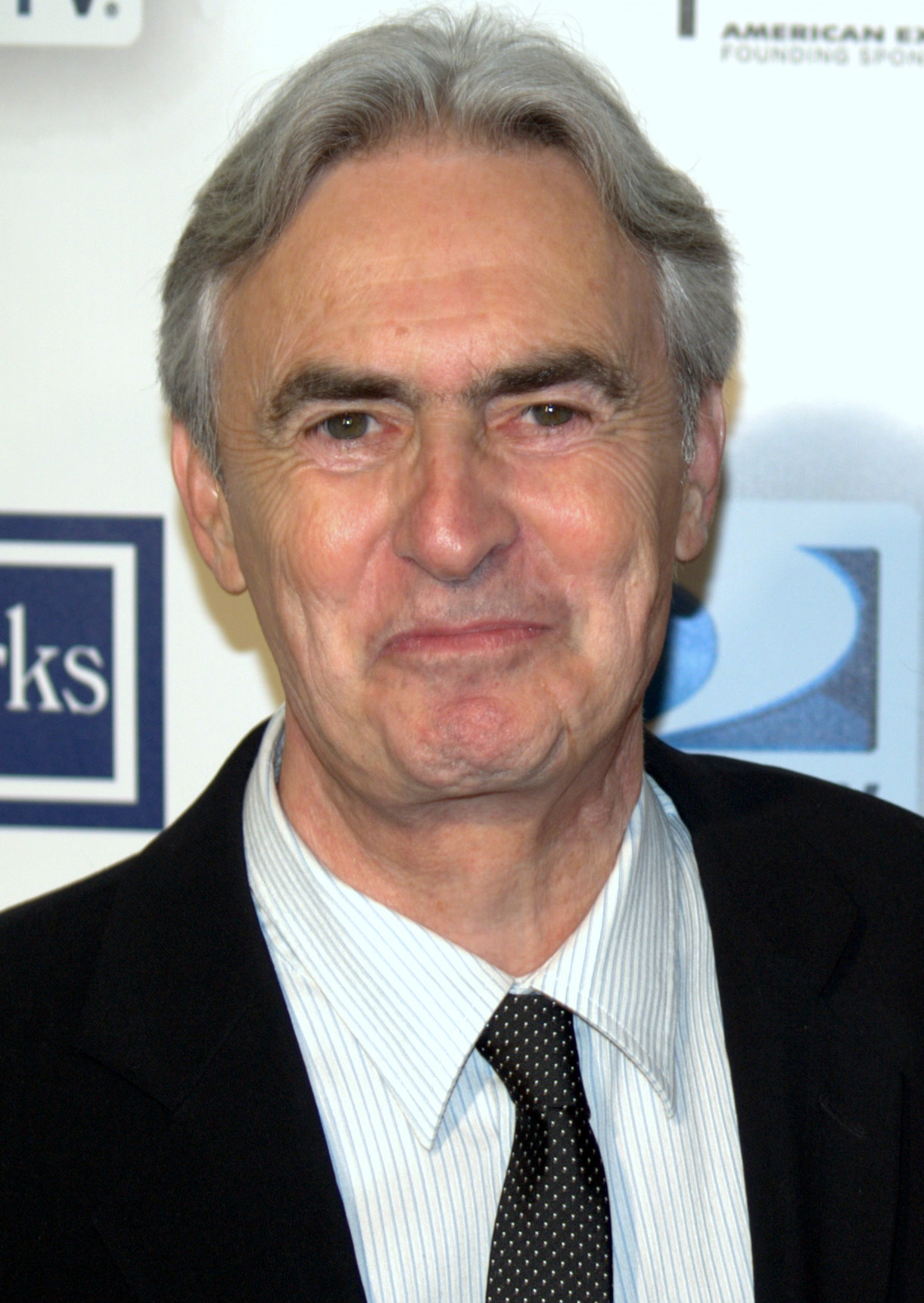
- Steinberg in 2009
- Born: August 9, 1942 (age 84); Winnipeg, Manitoba, Canada
- Spouses: Judy Marcione (m. 1973; div. 1997) Robyn Todd (m. 2005)

Comedy career
- Years active: 1964–present
- Medium: Stand-up, television, film, books
- Genres: Observational comedy, satire
- Subjects: Religion, self-deprecation, everyday life
- Website: thedavidsteinberg.com

David Steinberg CM (born August 9, 1942) is a Canadian comedian, actor, writer, director, and author. At the height of his popularity, during the late 1960s and mid-1970s, he was one of the best-known comics in the United States. He appeared on The Tonight Show Starring Johnny Carson more than 130 times (second only to Bob Hope in number of appearances) and served as guest host 12 times, the youngest person to guest-host. Steinberg directed several films and episodes of television situation comedies, including Seinfeld, Friends, Mad About You, Curb Your Enthusiasm, The Golden Girls, and Designing Women. Steinberg also hosted the interview program Inside Comedy on the Showtime network.

== Early life ==
Steinberg was born on August 9, 1942, in Winnipeg, Manitoba, the son of Rabbi Yasha Steinberg (1896–1966), a strict, Romanian-born rabbi, and Ruth Steinberg (c. 1904–1989). He has three older siblings: two brothers, Hymie Steinberg (1925–1944) and Fishy Steinberg, and one sister, Tammy Lazer (née Steinberg). His older brother Hymie served during World War II and was killed in action when he was 19. David initially studied theology in Israel.

Later, while studying English literature at the University of Chicago, he decided to become a comedian after seeing Lenny Bruce perform. He finished school and was discovered by one of the founders of The Second City in Chicago, which he joined in 1964. There he performed with Robert Klein, Fred Willard, Peter Boyle, and Joe Flaherty. He remained with the group for six years. In 1972, Steinberg was best man at the wedding of his friend, the gangster Crazy Joe Gallo.

== Career ==
One of Steinberg's most notorious performances was in October 1968 on The Smothers Brothers Comedy Hour, where he gave satirical sermons. The sketch caused CBS to receive a record number of complaints, and, as a result, the network instituted a policy of providing local stations with a closed-circuit telecast of each episode ahead of time so they could choose whether or not to air it. The Smothers Brothers were told by the network that they could have Steinberg on the show again on the condition that he would not repeat the sermons. Nevertheless, Tommy Smothers asked Steinberg to do it again, and he gave a sermon in which he said "The Old Testament scholars say that Jonah was swallowed by a whale. The Gentiles, the New Testament scholars say, 'Hold it, Jews, no.' They literally grabbed the Jews by the Old Testament." This incident contributed to the cancellation of the show. The Jonah sketch was never aired by CBS.

Steinberg appeared in two Broadway flops, Little Murders and Carry Me Back to Morningside Heights, which both closed within one week in 1967 and 1968, respectively.

Steinberg was the most frequent host of the pop and rock music ABC television show, The Music Scene, 1969–1970. The show featured performances by Joe Cocker and CSN&Y. In 1972, Steinberg wrote and starred in The David Steinberg Show in the United States as a five-week summer replacement sketch comedy show. Around the same time, TV Guide labelled Steinberg "offbeat, racy, outrageous, and establishment-baiting – all of which makes him a particular favorite among the young and disenchanted."

In 1975 Steinberg hosted Noonday, a short-lived half-hour midday talk show on NBC.

In 1976, Steinberg returned to Canada to produce a second show called The David Steinberg Show. This series was a hybrid sitcom/variety show, modelled loosely on The Jack Benny Program in that the plots centred on the star (Steinberg) and his cast trying to put together another instalment of their variety show. Amongst the regular cast were future SCTV stars Joe Flaherty, John Candy, Dave Thomas, and Martin Short. SCTV's Andrea Martin also appeared on the show, but not as a regular. SCTV premiered the same week as The David Steinberg Show, and ran for six seasons; The David Steinberg Show lasted only one season.

Steinberg performed some notable stand-up comedy during the 1960s and '70s. He released four comedy LPs, including The Incredible Shrinking God (LP MCA 73013, 1968), which contains ten of his comedic sermons and mini-sermons recorded live during his stand-up routine at Second City. He also hosted the 1977 Juno Awards show. He was inducted into Canada's Walk of Fame in 2003.

More recently (2005–2007), Steinberg hosted Sit Down Comedy with David Steinberg, an informal, interview-style show in which he talks with famous comedians and comic actors, for two seasons on TV Land in the U.S. The first season featured Mike Myers, Larry David, Jon Lovitz, Martin Short, Bob Newhart, and George Lopez. The second season featured Jerry Seinfeld, Robin Williams, Roseanne Barr, Jon Stewart, Garry Shandling and Ray Romano. The program was filmed before an audience at UCLA.

His first book, The Book of David (ISBN 0743272323), was published in June 2007 by Simon & Schuster.

In 2010, he directed and produced the Canadian cable comedy series Living in Your Car.

== Personal life ==
Steinberg has been married twice. He married Judy Marcione in 1973 and they had two daughters. They divorced in 1997 after 24 years of marriage. Steinberg married Robyn Todd in 2005.

== Discography ==
- The Incredible Shrinking God (UNI LP, UNI-73013, 1968)
- Disguised As A Normal Person (Elektra Records LP, EKS-74065, 1970).
- Booga! Booga! (Columbia LP, 1974)
- Goodbye to the '70s (Columbia LP, PC 33399, 1975)

== Awards ==
Steinberg has received five Emmy Award nominations, winning two as one of the writers of Academy Awards programs in 1991 and 1992. He received a CableACE Award in 1992 for his stand-up comedy Cats, Cops and Stuff. He has been nominated for the Directors Guild of America Award (for Outstanding Directing – Comedy Series) twice: first in 1991 for the Seinfeld episode, The Tape, and again in 1996 for the Mad About You episode, The Finale: Parts II and III, and has been nominated for a Canadian Comedy Award (2000) and a Gemini (2001), as well. His parody of the novel Ragtime won him a Playboy Humor Award. In 2003, he was inducted into Canada's Walk of Fame.

In December 2016, Steinberg was named a Member of the Order of Canada.

=== Film ===
Year	Title	Director	Writer	Producer	Actor	Role	Notes
1967	Fearless Frank				Yes	The Rat	
1969	The Lost Man				Yes	Photographer	
1978	The End				Yes	Marty Lieberman	
1979	Something Short of Paradise				Yes	Harris Sloane	
1980	Nothing Personal				Yes	Talk Show Host	
1981	Paternity	Yes					
1983	Going Berserk	Yes	Yes				
1996	Kids in the Hall: Brain Candy			Yes			
1997	The Wrong Guy	Yes			Yes	Outpatient in Neck Brace	
1999	Judgment Day: The Ellie Nesler Story			Yes			
2000	The Extreme Adventures of Super Dave		Yes	Yes			
2003	This Thing of Ours			Yes			
2013	When Jews Were Funny					Himself	Documentary
2015	Being Canadian					Himself	Documentary

=== Television ===
Year	Title	Director	Writer	Producer	Actor	Role	Notes
1968–1969	The Smothers Brothers Comedy Hour		Yes		Yes	Himself	
1968–1992	The Tonight Show Starring Johnny Carson					Himself / Guest host	
1969	NBC Experiment in Television		Yes				Episode: "This Is Sholom Aleichem"
1969–1970	The Music Scene		Yes			Host	14 episodes
1970	The Return of the Smothers Brothers		Yes		Yes	Himself	Television special
1971	The Odd Couple				Yes	Himself	Episode: "The Odd Couple Meet Their Host"
1972,1976–1977	The David Steinberg Show		Yes			Host	26 episodes
1973	ABC's Wide World of Entertainment				Yes	Paul	Episode: "Night Train to Terror"
1975	The Smothers Brothers Show				Yes	Himself	Episode: "A Boarding House Is Not A Home"
1985	The Twilight Zone	Yes					Segment: "The Uncle Devil Show"
1986	The Young Comedians All-Star Reunion			Yes			Television special
1986	Robin Williams: Live at the Met			Yes			Stand-up special
1986	Tall Tales & Legends	Yes					Episode: "Casey at the Bat"
1986	Billy Crystal: Don't Get Me Started			Yes			Television special
1986	The Ellen Burstyn Show	Yes					Episode: "Reading Between the Lines"
1986	The Golden Girls	Yes					Episode: "Big Daddy's Little Lady"
1986–1987	One Big Family	Yes					5 episodes
1986–1990	Newhart	Yes					15 episodes
1987	The Popcorn Kid	Yes					2 episodes
1987	Duet	Yes					3 episodes
1987–1991	Designing Women	Yes	Yes	Yes			
1988	Eisenhower and Lutz	Yes					Episode: "Bud Junior, Junior: Part 1"
1988	Family Man	Yes					5 episodes
1988	CBS Summer Playhouse	Yes					Episode: "Baby on Board"
1989	Billy Crystal: Midnight Train To Moscow			Yes			Television special
1989	I, Martin Short, Goes Home			Yes			Television special
1988	Annie McGuire	Yes					6 episodes
1989	It's Garry Shandling's Show	Yes					2 episodes
1990	The Earth Day Special		Yes				Television special
1990	The Fanelli Boys	Yes					Episode: "Pursued"
1990	Get a Life	Yes					Episode: "The Sitting"
1990–1991	Good Grief			Yes			13 episodes
1990–1991	Evening Shade	Yes		Yes			8 episodes
1991	63rd Academy Awards		Yes				Television special
1991–1998	Seinfeld	Yes					3 episodes
1992	64th Academy Awards		Yes				Television special
1993	Rick Reynolds: Only the Truth Is Funny	Yes					Television special
1993	65th Academy Awards		Yes				Television special
1993	It Had to Be You	Yes		Yes			4 episodes
1993	Daddy Dearest	Yes					2 episodes
1994–1999	Mad About You	Yes			Yes	Director / Bad Eulogizer	50 episodes
1995–1996	The Parent 'Hood	Yes					5 episodes
1996	Carver's Gate			Yes			Television film
1997	Lost on Earth			Yes			6 episodes
1997	69th Academy Awards		Yes				Television special
1997	Ink	Yes					Episode: "Logan's Run"
1998	Friends	Yes					Episode: "The One with Phoebe's Uterus"
1998	70th Academy Awards		Yes				Television special
1998	Living in Captivity	Yes					2 episodes
1999	The Wonderful World of Disney	Yes					Episode: "Switching Goals"
2000	72nd Academy Awards		Yes				Television special
2000–2001	Big Sound	Yes	Yes	Yes	Yes	Gabe Moss	Also creator
2000–2001	Even Stevens	Yes					2 episodes
2000–2017	Curb Your Enthusiasm	Yes					8 episodes
2002	Robin Williams: Live on Broadway			Yes			Stand-up special
2004	Good Girls Don't	Yes					Episode: "The Big O"
2004	76th Academy Awards		Yes				Television special
2005	Wild Card	Yes					Episode: "A Whisper from Zoe's Sister"
2005	The Comeback	Yes					2 episodes
2005–2007	Sit Down Comedy with David Steinberg		Yes	Yes		Host	Also creator
2006	Carlos Mencia: No Strings Attached	Yes					Stand-up special
2006	Campus Ladies	Yes					3 episodes
2006	Sons & Daughters	Yes					2 episodes
2006	Help Me Help You	Yes					Episode: "Perseverance"
2007	Jim Norton: Monster Rain			Yes			Stand-up special
2008	Weeds	Yes					Episode: "The Whole Blah Damn Thing"
2008	Down and Dirty with Jim Norton			Yes			4 episodes
2008	Little Britain USA			Yes			6 episodes
2009	Robin Williams: Weapons of Self Destruction			Yes			Stand-up special
2010	Living in Your Car	Yes		Yes			4 episodes
2011	Norm Macdonald: Me Doing Stand-Up	Yes					Stand-up special
2011	Single White Spenny	Yes					Episode: "Circumcision"
2012	84th Academy Awards		Yes				Television special
2013	Law & Order: Special Victims Unit				Yes	Party Guest	Episode: "Wonderland Story"
2013	Quality Balls: The David Steinberg Story					Himself	Documentary
2012–2015	Inside Comedy	Yes		Yes		Host	36 episodes
2015	The Comedians				Yes	Billy's Agent (voice)	Episode: "Go for Gad"
