= The David Steinberg Show =

The David Steinberg Show is the title of two separate shows which featured stand-up comedian David Steinberg.

== The David Steinberg Show (1972) ==
The first iteration of The David Steinberg Show ran on CBS television in the United States for five weeks in the summer of 1972. This series was an hour-long sketch comedy show, in which Steinberg was the only regular. Other sketch roles were played by the two or three guest stars Steinberg would introduce each week.

== The David Steinberg Show (1976) ==
The David Steinberg Show
- Genre: Comedy/Variety
- Starring: David Steinberg; Bill Saluga
- Country of origin: Canada
- Original language: English
- No. of seasons: 1
- No. of episodes: 24

Production
- Running time: 30 minutes

Original release
- Network: CTV Television Network
- Release: 24 September 1976 – 19 April 1977

Four years later, Steinberg starred in a comedy/variety series also called The David Steinberg Show, which was produced in Canada for the CTV Network and was seen in the US in syndication. The series ran during 1976-77 television season, and lasted 24 episodes. This series was partly modelled on The Jack Benny Program, in that it was largely about the behind-the-scenes adventures of the cast of a variety show and their friends. Each episode included material from the "variety show" that was being produced, as well as backstage segments. Most of the episodes were released on a 3-disc DVD set and Amazon Prime Video but 3 episodes, "Phyllis Diller", "Elliott Gould" and "Richard Pryor", were not on included on either and a further episode, "Norm Crosby", is not on Amazon.

=== Supporting cast ===
The supporting cast featured a number of people who would go on to greater fame on SCTV, and many Steinberg cast members were, in fact, simultaneously working on the first season of SCTV, which debuted the same week as The David Steinberg Show. SCTV cast members doing "double duty" on Steinberg included Joe Flaherty, Dave Thomas and John Candy. Martin Short, also a Steinberg regular, would later become a cast member of SCTV, but not until 1982. (After he joined SCTV, Short portrayed Steinberg in an SCTV sketch.)

SCTV stalwart Andrea Martin also appeared in a few episodes of The David Steinberg Show, but not as a regular.

The cast of the 1976-77 edition of The David Steinberg Show were:

- David Steinberg as himself, the genial but beleaguered host of a variety show.
- Bill Saluga as Vinnie DeMilo and as Ray J. Johnson. Vinnie is the owner of the nearby "Hello Deli", and David's chief confidante. The cigar-chomping Ray J. Johnson, a separate character, occasionally drops by the show (but never the deli) to interrupt David's monologues with his own rambling observations.
- Trudy Young as Margie, the friendly Hello Deli waitress.
- John Candy as Spider Reichman, the wide-eyed, hippie-ish bandleader. Candy also provided the voice of Vinnie's cook, who is frequently heard in the offstage Hello Deli kitchen, but is never seen onscreen.
- Joe Flaherty as Kirk Dirkman, a deliveryman who rather improbably becomes a network executive overseeing David's show.
- Martin Short as Johnny Del Bravo, David's obnoxious, narcissistic, talent-free cousin who is the "featured singer" on the show.
- Dave Thomas as James MacGregor, the show's excitable Scottish security guard.
- Blue as Bambi Markowitz, David's ditzy, incompetent secretary/assistant.

=== Episode air dates and Special Guests ===
No. in series	Original air date	Guest
1	24 Sep. 1976	James Coco
2	1 Oct. 1976	Milton Berle
3	8 Oct. 1976	Tommy Smothers
4	15 Oct. 1976	Adrienne Barbeau
5	22 Oct. 1976	Ed McMahon
6	29 Oct. 1976	Conrad Bain
7	12 Nov. 1976	Phyllis Diller
8	19 Nov. 1976	Elliott Gould
9	26 Nov. 1976	Jon Voight
10	3 Dec. 1976	Avery Schreiber
11	10 Dec. 1976	Scatman Crothers and Mason Reese
12	17 Dec. 1976	Peggy Cass
13	11 Jan. 1977	Ethel Merman
14	18 Jan. 1977	Robert Vaughn
15	25 Jan. 1977	Ruth Buzzi
16	1 Feb. 1977	Anthony Davis
17	8 Feb. 1977	Marcia Wallace
18	15 Feb. 1977	Joseph Campanella
19	22 Feb. 1977	Norm Crosby
20	8 Mar. 1977	Bill Macy and Samantha Harper
21	15 Mar. 1977	Bob and Ray
22	22 Mar. 1977	Rip Taylor
23	12 Apr. 1977	Michele Lee
24	19. Apr 1977	Richard Pryor
