= 1954 in Indiana =

- Decades: 1930s; 1940s; 1950s; 1960s; 1970s
- See also: History of Indiana; Historical outline of Indiana; List of years in Indiana; 1954 in the United States

The following is a list of events of the year 1954 in Indiana.

== Incumbents ==
- Governor: George N. Craig (R)
- Lieutenant Governor: Crawford F. Parker (R)

== Events ==
- September 21 – Construction officially begins on the Indiana Toll Road (Interstate 80/90) in northern Indiana, marking the start of the state's largest infrastructure project at the time.
- November 2 – The 1954 United States House of Representatives elections in Indiana take place, with the Republican Party maintaining a majority by winning 9 out of the state's 11 congressional seats.

=== Sports ===
- March 20 – The "Milan Miracle": Tiny Milan High School wins the Indiana state basketball championship against Muncie Central, inspiring the famous 1986 sports film Hoosiers.
- May 31 – The 1954 Indianapolis 500 is held at the Indianapolis Motor Speedway. Bill Vukovich wins his second consecutive Indy 500 race.

== Births ==
- December 11 – Jermaine Jackson, American singer

== See also ==
- 1954 in the United States
