= Ray Romano =

American comedian and actor (born 1957)

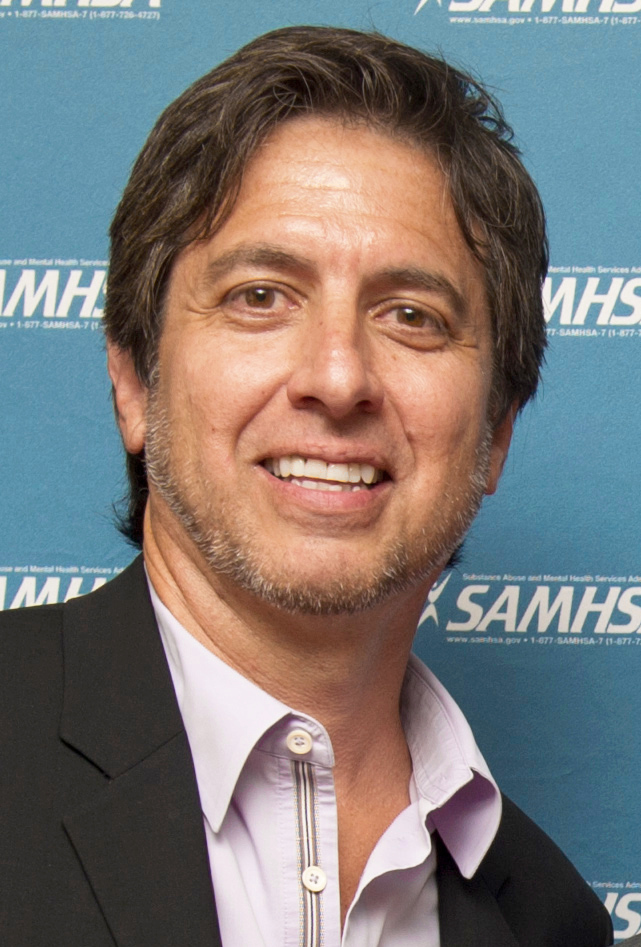
- Romano at the Voice Awards 2014
- Born: Raymond Albert Romano; December 21, 1957 (age 68); New York City, U.S.
- Spouse: Anna Scarpulla (m. 1987)
- Children: 4

Comedy career
- Years active: 1989–present
- Medium: Stand-up; television; film
- Genres: Observational comedy; blue comedy; slapstick
- Website: rayromano.com

Raymond Albert Romano (born December 21, 1957) is an American stand-up comedian and actor. He is best known for his role as Raymond "Ray" Barone on the CBS sitcom Everybody Loves Raymond (1996–2005), for which he won three Primetime Emmy Awards (one as an actor and two as producer). He is also known for being the voice of Manny in the Ice Age franchise. He has received several other awards including nominations for two Grammy Awards and two Golden Globe Awards.

He created and starred in the TNT comedy drama Men of a Certain Age (2009–2011). From 2012 to 2015, Romano had a recurring role as Hank Rizzoli, a love interest of Sarah Braverman in the NBC series Parenthood. More recently he co-starred in the romantic comedy The Big Sick (2017) and portrayed mob lawyer Bill Bufalino in Martin Scorsese's epic crime film The Irishman (2019). From 2017 to 2019, Romano portrayed Rick Moreweather in the Epix comedy-drama series Get Shorty.

== Early life and education ==
Romano was born in the Queens borough of New York City, the second son of Luciana "Lucie" (née Fortini) (d. 2021), a piano teacher, and Albert Romano (1925–2010), a real estate agent and engineer. He is of Italian descent. He grew up in the Forest Hills neighborhood of Queens. He has an older brother, Richard (born 1956), an NYPD sergeant, and a younger brother, Robert (born c. 1966), a second grade teacher in New York City.

Romano attended elementary and middle school at Our Lady Queen of Martyrs in Forest Hills. After transferring from Archbishop Molloy High School, Romano graduated from Hillcrest High School in 1975. He was in the same high school class as Fran Drescher. Before getting into show business, Romano briefly attended Queens College, in Flushing, New York, where he studied accounting.

== Career ==
While working as a futon deliveryman, Romano performed as a comedian under the name "Jackie Roberts." One delivery involved dropping off a futon at then-Saturday Night Live writer Larry David's apartment. Romano recalls telling David he was a fan of Fridays, which David previously worked on.

His early comedy career started when he competed in the Johnnie Walker Comedy Search in 1989, directed by Saturday Night Live short film producer Neal Marshad and appeared on The Comedy Channel. His career included many outlets, such as Comedy Central, where he had been a recurring guest voice on the show Dr. Katz, Professional Therapist. He also was a contestant on Star Search in the stand-up comedy category. He was cast to play Joe (originally named Rick) on the American television sitcom NewsRadio, but was fired and replaced with Greg Lee in the pilot and then Joe Rogan for the rest of the show. He then appeared on Late Show with David Letterman doing his stand up routine which formed his ties with CBS. Shortly thereafter, he became the star of his own show, Everybody Loves Raymond on CBS, that featured a cast and format more suitable to Romano's brand of humor. His work on the series earned him six Primetime Emmy Award nominations as Outstanding Lead Actor in a Comedy Series, a category he won in 2002. He also shared two Emmy Awards as an executive producer when his show won as Outstanding Comedy Series in 2003 and 2005.

Romano performed the opening monologue at the 1998 White House Correspondents' Association dinner.

Romano and his comedian friend Kevin James starred in the salesman comedy Grilled as two average Joes of the same profession who are both desperate to land a big sale.

Romano was featured on a 2000 episode of Who Wants to Be a Millionaire, on which he won $125,000 for the NYPD's D.A.R.E. unit. The following year, he and one of his brothers appeared on a New York Police Department recruiting poster.

In 2004, Romano became the highest-paid television actor in history for his role of Raymond on CBS's Everybody Loves Raymond. The show broke another record by having the highest revenue, at $3.9 billion.

On December 13, 2003, Romano was a guest star, sending a birthday card to Bob Barker for Barker's 80th birthday on the 27th "Million Dollar Spectacular" special of the CBS game show The Price Is Right.

Romano was the subject of the documentary film 95 Miles to Go. The film documents Romano's road trip across the south of the United States. The film was released in theaters on April 7, 2010, by ThinkFilm. In August 2006 Romano was interviewed in front of a live audience at UCLA by fellow stand-up veteran David Steinberg, for an episode of Sit Down Comedy with David Steinberg. The program first aired on the TV Land network in March 2007.

Romano returned to television with a new dramedy for TNT in 2008, Men of a Certain Age, which he co-created with former Everybody Loves Raymond writer Mike Royce. It co-starred Scott Bakula and Andre Braugher.

Romano made an appearance in the seventh season of NBC series The Office as Merv Bronte, a nervous job applicant interviewing for the job left vacant by Michael Scott.

Romano made an appearance in the third-season premiere of the ABC sitcom The Middle as Nicky, a friend of Mike, who ruined his and Frankie's honeymoon. Romano was the second actor from Everybody Loves Raymond to be reunited with Patricia Heaton on The Middle; Doris Roberts guest starred in three episodes.

He joined the cast of Parenthood beginning with its fourth season premiere. He became a semi regular, playing photographer Hank Rizzoli, who hired and later had a romantic relationship with Sarah Braverman and developed a friendship with her nephew who has Asperger syndrome. The role was specifically created for him after he expressed his love for the series and met with creator Jason Katims on the set of Friday Night Lights.

In 2002, Romano voiced the woolly mammoth Manny in the animated Blue Sky Studios film Ice Age. He has since reprised the role in four sequels: Ice Age: The Meltdown (2006), Ice Age: Dawn of the Dinosaurs (2009), Ice Age: Continental Drift (2012), and Ice Age: Collision Course (2016), along with two TV specials, and is set to return for the sixth film in 2026.

From 2017 to 2019, Romano played a leading role in three seasons of the MGM+ television show Get Shorty, created by Davey Holmes and co-starring Chris O'Dowd.

In 2019, Romano starred in the Netflix comedy film Paddleton and portrayed mob lawyer Bill Bufalino in Martin Scorsese's The Irishman.

Romano is set to play Jim Valvano in an upcoming film about him.

== Competitions ==
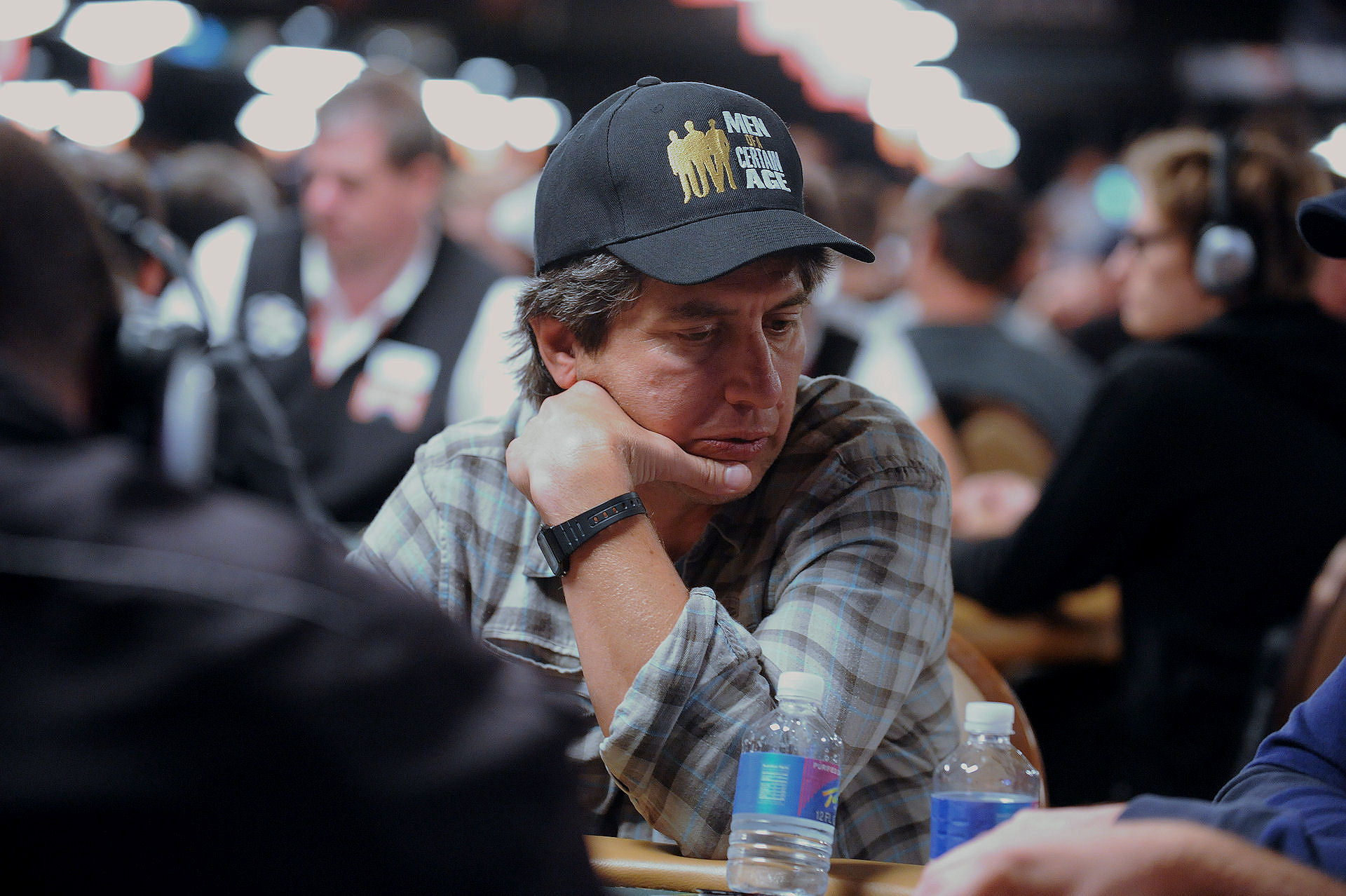
Romano at the 2010 World Series of Poker main event

Romano competed in the World Series of Poker in 2007, 2008, 2009, 2010, 2011, 2013, 2015 and 2023.

In early 2010, Romano starred in the second season of The Golf Channel's original series The Haney Project in which Tiger Woods' former coach Hank Haney attempts to improve the golf games of different celebrities and athletes. Romano's goal was to finish the show being able to break 80. Romano took time off from the show to be with his father, Albert Romano, who died in March 2010. Romano is also a regular competitor in the AT&T Pebble Beach National Pro-Am, where he finished fifth in 2012 with his partner, Australian professional Steven Bowditch. It was the first time Romano had qualified for the final round after failing to do so on 11 successive occasions. He also competes annually in the American Century Championship, a celebrity golf tournament owned by NBC and held at Lake Tahoe each July.

== Personal life ==
Romano married his wife, Anna Scarpulla, in 1987. They met while working at the same bank. They have four children, and they own a property in La Quinta, California. Romano's character's daughter on Everybody Loves Raymond was named after his real life daughter, Alexandra "Ally" Romano. Also, in the series pilot, Ray and Debra's twin boys were named Gregory and Matthew, after Romano's real life twin sons, but Romano felt it was inconvenient to have all his television children have the same names as his real children and changed the twins' names to Geoffrey and Michael onscreen. He also said his brother was not pleased with Ray Barone's television brother. Ally was married in September 2024 and welcomed her first child in February 2026.

Romano's family has made various appearances in the show. Romano's daughter made several appearances on Everybody Loves Raymond as Molly, the best friend of his on screen daughter, Ally, and the daughter of Ray Barone's nemesis, Peggy the Cookie Lady. Romano's father, Albert Romano, has made various appearances as Albert, one of Frank Barone's lodge buddies in various episodes, such as "Debra at the Lodge", and "Boys' Therapy". Romano's brother, Richard Romano, appeared in the episodes "Golf For It", "Just a Formality", and "The Toaster". Romano's wife, Anna, appeared as one of the moms in the background at Geoffrey and Michael's school in season 6's episode titled "The Angry Family".

In February 2012, Romano revealed that his wife, Anna, had successfully battled stage one breast cancer in 2010. Romano told People magazine that "the reason we're going public is to share our experience, yeah, but to have an effect. Our goal is to help people."

Romano was close friends with Doris Roberts, who played Marie Barone, Ray Barone's mother, on Everybody Loves Raymond. At the time of her death, Romano said he was inspired by her desire to continue learning throughout her life. She also served as a mentor, helping him to feel more comfortable on set.

== Filmography ==
=== Film ===
| Year | Title | Role | Notes |
|---|---|---|---|
| 1990 | Caesar's Salad | Policeman | Short film |
| 2002 | Ice Age | Manny | Voice role |
| 2004 | Welcome to Mooseport | Handy Harrison | |
| 2004 | Eulogy | Skip Collins | |
| 2004 | 95 Miles to Go | Himself | |
| 2006 | Ice Age: The Meltdown | Manny | Voice role |
| 2006 | Grilled | Maurice | |
| 2008 | The Last Word | Abel | |
| 2008 | The Grand | Fred Marsh | |
| 2009 | Ice Age: Dawn of the Dinosaurs | Manny | Voice role |
| 2009 | Funny People | Himself | Cameo |
| 2010 | Exporting Raymond | Himself | Cameo |
| 2012 | Ice Age: Continental Drift | Manny | Voice role |
| 2014 | Rob the Mob | Jerry Cardozo | |
| 2016 | Ice Age: Collision Course | Manny | Voice role |
| 2017 | The Big Sick | Terry Gardner | |
| 2019 | Paddleton | Andy Freeman | Also executive producer |
| 2019 | Bad Education | Big Bob Spicer | |
| 2019 | The Irishman | Bill Bufalino | |
| 2022 | Somewhere in Queens | Leo Russo | Also director, writer, and producer |
| 2024 | Fly Me to the Moon | Henry Smalls | |
| 2025 | The Best You Can | Doug Finkelman | |
| 2027 | Ice Age: Boiling Point † | Manny | In production; voice role |

=== Television ===
| Year | Title | Role | Notes |
|---|---|---|---|
| 1995–1997 | Dr. Katz, Professional Therapist | Ray | Voice role; 7 episodes |
| 1995–2015 | Late Show with David Letterman | Himself | 31 episodes |
| 1996–2005 | Everybody Loves Raymond | Raymond Barone | Main role; also writer and executive producer |
| 1997 | Cosby | Raymond Barone | Episode: "Lucas Raymondicus" |
| 1998–2005 | The King of Queens | Raymond Barone | 4 episodes |
| 1998 | The Nanny | Raymond Barone | Episode: "The Reunion Show" |
| 1999 | Becker | Raymond Barone | Episode: "Drive, They Said" |
| 1999–2003 | Saturday Night Live | Himself (host) | 2 episodes |
| 2002 | All That | Himself | Episode 709 |
| 2002 | Sesame Street | Himself | Episode 3,983 |
| 2005 | The Simpsons | Ray Magini | Voice role; episode: "Don't Fear the Roofer" |
| 2005 | Kathy Griffin: My Life on the D-List | Himself | Episode: "Hot to Tot" |
| 2007 | 'Til Death | Guest at Italian Restaurant | Episode: "The Italian Affair" |
| 2007 | The Knights of Prosperity | Himself | Episode: "Operation: Oswald Montecristo" |
| 2007 | After Hours with Daniel | Himself | Episode: "Ford's Filling Station" |
| 2008 | Hannah Montana | | Episode: "We're All on This Date Together" |
| 2009–2011 | Men of a Certain Age | Joe Tranelli | Main role; also writer, creator, and executive producer |
| 2011 | The Office | Merv Bronte | Episode: "Search Committee" |
| 2011 | The Middle | Nicky Kohlbrenner | Episode: "Forced Family Fun" (parts 1 & 2) |
| 2011 | Ice Age: A Mammoth Christmas | Manny | Voice role; TV special |
| 2014 | Maron | Himself | Episode: "Marc's New Friend" |
| 2012–2015 | Parenthood | Hank Rizzoli | Recurring role; 44 episodes |
| 2015 | David Letterman: A Life on Television | Himself (host) | TV special |
| 2016 | Ice Age: The Great Egg-Scapade | Manny | Voice role; TV special |
| 2016 | Vinyl | Zak Yankovich | Main role |
| 2016 | Kevin Can Wait | Vic | Episode: "Beat the Parents" |
| 2017–2019 | Get Shorty | Rick Moreweather | Main role |
| 2019 | Crashing | Himself | Episode: "The Secret" |
| 2020 | One Day at a Time | Brian | Episode: "Checking Boxes" |
| 2021 | Who Wants to Be a Millionaire? | Himself | 2 episodes |
| 2021–2022 | Made for Love | Herbert Green | Main role |
| 2023 | Bupkis | Himself | 3 episodes |
| 2023 | Bookie | Artie | Episode: "Always Smell the Money" (uncredited) |
| 2024 | Celebrity IOU | Himself | Episode: "Everyone Loves a Ray Romano Renovation" |
| 2024 | No Good Deed | Paul Morgan | Main cast |
| 2026 | Running Point | Norm Stinson | 5 episodes |

=== Video games ===
| Year | Title | Role |
|---|---|---|
| 2006 | Ice Age 2: The Meltdown | Manny |
| 2009 | Ice Age: Dawn of the Dinosaurs | Manny |
| 2013 | Ice Age Village | Manny |

== Writing credits ==
=== Everybody Loves Raymond ===
In addition to his roles as star and producer of Everybody Loves Raymond, Romano also co-wrote the following episodes:

Season one

- "Why Are We Here?" (with Tom Paris)

Season two

- "Golf" (with Tom Caltabiano and Kevin James)
- "The Wedding" (with Philip Rosenthal)

Season three

- "Ray Home Alone" (with Tucker Cawley)
- "How They Met" (with Philip Rosenthal)

Season four

- "Debra's Workout" (with Tom Caltabiano and Mike Royce)
- "Bad Moon Rising" (with Philip Rosenthal)

Season five

- "Super Bowl" (with Mike Royce)

Season six

- "Jealous Robert" (with Tom Caltabiano)
- "Talk to Your Daughter" (with Tucker Cawley)
- "The First Time" (with Tom Caltabiano and Mike Royce)

Season seven

- "She's the One" (with Philip Rosenthal)
- "The Bachelor Party" (with Mike Royce and Tom Caltabiano)

Season nine

- "Angry Sex" (with Lew Schneider and Mike Scully)

=== Men of a Certain Age ===
Season one

- "Pilot" (with Mike Royce)
- "Let It Go" (with Mike Royce)
- "Back in the Shit" (teleplay) with Mike Royce

Season two

- "If I Could, I Surely Would" (with Mike Royce)

== Discography ==
- Live at Carnegie Hall (2001, Columbia) - CD

== Bibliography ==
- Everything and a Kite (non-fiction) (1999)
- Raymie, Dickie and the Bean (children's) (2005)
- Everybody Loves Raymond: Our Family Album (2004)

== Awards and nominations ==
| Association | Year | Category | Nominated work | Results | Ref |
|---|---|---|---|---|---|
| America Film Institute Awards | 2002 | Actor of the Year - Male - TV Series | Everybody Loves Raymond | Nominated | |
| American Comedy Awards | 1999 | Funniest Male Performer in a TV Series (Leading Role) Network, Cable or Syndication | Everybody Loves Raymond | Nominated | |
| American Comedy Awards | 2000 | Funniest Male Performer in a TV Series (Leading Role) Network, Cable or Syndication | Everybody Loves Raymond | Won | |
| American Comedy Awards | 2001 | Funniest Male Performer in a TV Series (Leading Role) Network, Cable or Syndication | Everybody Loves Raymond | Nominated | |
| The BAM Awards | 2017 | Best Cast | The Big Sick | Nominated | |
| Behind the Voice Actors Awards | 2013 | Best Vocal Ensemble in a Feature Film | Ice Age: Continental Drift | Nominated | |
| CableACE Awards | 1995 | Animated Programming Special or Series (as Producer) | Dr. Katz, Professional Therapist | Won | |
| Denver Film Critics Society | 2018 | Best Supporting Actor | The Big Sick | Nominated | |
| Golden Globes | 2000 | Best Performance by an Actor in a Television Series - Comedy or Musical | Everybody Loves Raymond | Nominated | |
| Golden Globes | 2001 | Best Performance by an Actor in a Television Series - Comedy or Musical | Everybody Loves Raymond | Nominated | |
| Grammy Awards | 2002 | Best Spoken Comedy Album | Live At Carnegie Hall | Nominated | |
| Grammy Awards | 2006 | Best Spoken Word Album for Children | Raymie, Dickie, and the Bean: Why I Love and Hate My Brothers | Nominated | |
| IGN Summer Movie Awards | 2009 | Favorite Cameo | Funny People | Nominated | |
| Indiana Film Journalists Association | 2019 | Best Actor | Paddleton | Nominated | |
| Kid's Choice Awards | 2003 | Favorite Voice from an Animated Movie | Ice Age | Nominated | |
| Kid's Choice Awards | 2010 | Favorite Voice from an Animated Movie | Ice Age: Dawn of the Dinosaurs | Nominated | |
| North Texas Film Critics Association | 2017 | Best Supporting Actor | The Big Sick | Nominated | |
| Online Film & Television Association | 2000 | Best Actor in a Comedy Series | Everybody Loves Raymond | Nominated | |
| Online Film & Television Association | 2000 | Best Ensemble in a Comedy Series | Everybody Loves Raymond | Nominated | |
| Online Film & Television Association | 2001 | Best Actor in a Comedy Series | Everybody Loves Raymond | Nominated | |
| Online Film & Television Association | 2001 | Best Ensemble in a Comedy Series | Everybody Loves Raymond | Nominated | |
| Online Film & Television Association | 2002 | Best Ensemble in a Comedy Series | Everybody Loves Raymond | Nominated | |
| Online Film & Television Association | 2003 | Best Ensemble in a Comedy Series | Everybody Loves Raymond | Nominated | |
| Online Film & Television Association | 2014 | Best Guest Actor in a Drama Series | Parenthood | Nominated | |
| Online Film & Television Association | 2020 | Best Ensemble | The Irishman | Nominated | |
| People's Choice Awards | 2002 | Favorite Male Television Performer (tied with Kelsey Grammer) | Everybody Loves Raymond | Won | |
| People's Choice Awards | 2003 | Favorite Male Television Performer | Everybody Loves Raymond | Won | |
| People's Choice Awards | 2004 | Favorite Male Television Performer | Everybody Loves Raymond | Won | |
| People's Choice Awards | 2006 | Favorite Male Television Performer | Everybody Loves Raymond | Won | |
| Primetime Emmy Awards | 1999 | Outstanding Comedy Series (as Producer) | Everybody Loves Raymond | Nominated | |
| Primetime Emmy Awards | 1999 | Outstanding Lead Actor in a Comedy Series | Everybody Loves Raymond | Nominated | |
| Primetime Emmy Awards | 2000 | Outstanding Comedy Series (as Producer) | Everybody Loves Raymond | Nominated | |
| Primetime Emmy Awards | 2000 | Outstanding Lead Actor in a Comedy Series | Everybody Loves Raymond | Nominated | |
| Primetime Emmy Awards | 2001 | Outstanding Comedy Series (as Producer) | Everybody Loves Raymond | Nominated | |
| Primetime Emmy Awards | 2001 | Outstanding Lead Actor in a Comedy Series | Everybody Loves Raymond | Nominated | |
| Primetime Emmy Awards | 2002 | Outstanding Comedy Series (as Producer) | Everybody Loves Raymond | Nominated | |
| Primetime Emmy Awards | 2002 | Outstanding Lead Actor in a Comedy Series | Everybody Loves Raymond | Won | |
| Primetime Emmy Awards | 2003 | Outstanding Comedy Series (as Producer) | Everybody Loves Raymond | Won | |
| Primetime Emmy Awards | 2003 | Outstanding Lead Actor in a Comedy Series | Everybody Loves Raymond | Nominated | |
| Primetime Emmy Awards | 2004 | Outstanding Comedy Series (as Producer) | Everybody Loves Raymond | Nominated | |
| Primetime Emmy Awards | 2005 | Outstanding Comedy Series (as Producer) | Everybody Loves Raymond | Won | |
| Primetime Emmy Awards | 2005 | Outstanding Writing for a Comedy Series (as Writer) | Everybody Loves Raymond | Nominated | |
| Primetime Emmy Awards | 2005 | Outstanding Lead Actor in a Comedy Series | Everybody Loves Raymond | Nominated | |
| Primetime Emmy Awards | 2005 | Outstanding Variety, Music or Comedy Special (as Producer) | Everybody Loves Raymond: The Last Laugh | Nominated | |
| Producers Guild Awards | 2003 | Outstanding Producer of Episodic Television, Comedy | Everybody Loves Raymond | Nominated | |
| Producers Guild Awards | 2004 | Outstanding Producer of Episodic Television, Comedy | Everybody Loves Raymond | Nominated | |
| San Diego Film Critics Society Awards | 2017 | Best Comedic Performance | The Big Sick | Nominated | |
| Satellite Awards | 2002 | Best Actor in a Series, Comedy or Musical | Everybody Loves Raymond | Nominated | |
| Screen Actors Guild Awards | 1999 | Outstanding Ensemble in a Comedy Series | Everybody Loves Raymond | Nominated | |
| Screen Actors Guild Awards | 2000 | Outstanding Male Actor in a Comedy Series | Everybody Loves Raymond | Nominated | |
| Screen Actors Guild Awards | 2000 | Outstanding Ensemble in a Comedy Series | Everybody Loves Raymond | Nominated | |
| Screen Actors Guild Awards | 2002 | Outstanding Male Actor in a Comedy Series | Everybody Loves Raymond | Nominated | |
| Screen Actors Guild Awards | 2002 | Outstanding Ensemble in a Comedy Series | Everybody Loves Raymond | Nominated | |
| Screen Actors Guild Awards | 2003 | Outstanding Male Actor in a Comedy Series | Everybody Loves Raymond | Nominated | |
| Screen Actors Guild Awards | 2003 | Outstanding Ensemble in a Comedy Series | Everybody Loves Raymond | Won | |
| Screen Actors Guild Awards | 2004 | Outstanding Male Actor in a Comedy Series | Everybody Loves Raymond | Nominated | |
| Screen Actors Guild Awards | 2004 | Outstanding Ensemble in a Comedy Series | Everybody Loves Raymond | Nominated | |
| Screen Actors Guild Awards | 2005 | Outstanding Male Actor in a Comedy Series | Everybody Loves Raymond | Nominated | |
| Screen Actors Guild Awards | 2005 | Outstanding Ensemble in a Comedy Series | Everybody Loves Raymond | Nominated | |
| Screen Actors Guild Awards | 2006 | Outstanding Ensemble in a Comedy Series | Everybody Loves Raymond | Nominated | |
| Screen Actors Guild Awards | 2018 | Outstanding Cast in a Motion Picture | The Big Sick | Nominated | |
| Screen Actors Guild Awards | 2020 | Outstanding Cast in a Motion Picture | The Irishman | Nominated | |
| TCA Awards | 1999 | Individual Achievement in Comedy | Everybody Loves Raymond | Nominated | |
| TCA Awards | 2000 | Individual Achievement in Comedy | Everybody Loves Raymond | Nominated | |
| TCA Awards | 2001 | Individual Achievement in Comedy | Everybody Loves Raymond | Nominated | |
| TCA Awards | 2002 | Individual Achievement in Comedy | Everybody Loves Raymond | Nominated | |
| TCA Awards | 2005 | Individual Achievement in Comedy | Everybody Loves Raymond | Nominated | |
| TV Guide Awards | 2000 | Favorite Actor in a Comedy | Everybody Loves Raymond | Nominated | |
| TV Guide Awards | 2001 | Actor of the Year in a Comedy Series | Everybody Loves Raymond | Won | |
| Viewers for Quality Television Awards | 1997 | Best Actor in a Quality Comedy Series | Everybody Loves Raymond | Nominated | |
| Viewers for Quality Television Awards | 1998 | Best Actor in a Quality Comedy Series | Everybody Loves Raymond | Nominated | |
| Viewers for Quality Television Awards | 1999 | Best Actor in a Quality Comedy Series | Everybody Loves Raymond | Won | |
| Viewers for Quality Television Awards | 2000 | Best Actor in a Quality Comedy Series | Everybody Loves Raymond | Won | |
| Writers Guild Awards | 2011 | New Series (for Writing) | Men of a Certain Age | Nominated | |
