= 1953 in Indiana =

- Decades: 1930s; 1940s; 1950s; 1960s; 1970s
- See also: History of Indiana; Historical outline of Indiana; List of years in Indiana; 1953 in the United States

The following is a list of events of the year 1953 in Indiana.

== Incumbents ==
- Governor: Henry F. Schricker (Democratic) (until January 12), George N. Craig (Republican) (starting January 12)
- Lieutenant Governor: John A. Watkins (Democratic) (until January 12), Crawford F. Parker (Republican) (starting January 12)

== Events ==
=== Sports ===
- May 30 – The 1953 Indianapolis 500 (known as "The Hottest 500" due to extreme heat) is held at the Indianapolis Motor Speedway. Bill Vukovich wins the race, dominating by leading 195 out of 200 laps.

== Births ==
- October 15 – Tito Jackson, American guitarist and musician (member of The Jackson 5).
