= 1958 in Indiana =

- Decades: 1930s; 1940s; 1950s; 1960s; 1970s
- See also: History of Indiana; Historical outline of Indiana; List of years in Indiana; 1958 in the United States

The following is a list of events of the year 1958 in Indiana.

== Incumbents ==
- Governor: Harold W. Handley (R)
- Lieutenant Governor: Crawford F. Parker (R)

== Events ==
- November 4 – The 1958 United States Senate election in Indiana takes place. Democrat R. Vance Hartke wins the Senate seat, defeating the sitting Republican Governor, Harold W. Handley, who ran for the Senate while remaining in office as governor.
- November 4 – The 1958 United States House of Representatives elections in Indiana take place, resulting in significant gains for the Democratic Party, which flips several congressional districts in the state.

=== Sports ===
- March 22 – Fort Wayne South Side High School wins the Indiana High School Athletic Association (IHSAA) state basketball championship, defeating Indianapolis Attucks.
- May 30 – The 1958 Indianapolis 500 is held at the Indianapolis Motor Speedway. Jimmy Bryan wins the race, which was marred by a 15-car crash on the opening lap that resulted in the death of popular driver Pat O'Connor.

== Births ==
- August 29 – Michael Jackson, American singer (d. 2009)
