= 1951 in Indiana =

- Decades: 1930s; 1940s; 1950s; 1960s; 1970s
- See also: History of Indiana; Historical outline of Indiana; List of years in Indiana; 1951 in the United States

The following is a list of events of the year 1951 in Indiana.

== Incumbents ==
- Governor: Henry F. Schricker (Democratic)
- Lieutenant Governor: John A. Watkins (Democratic)

== Events ==
- January-February – Extreme cold weather and prolonged freezing conditions affect the state, obstructing navigation on the Ohio River and leading to local emergencies in southern Indiana.
- September 4 – Indianapolis residents witness the first live coast-to-coast transcontinental television broadcast as local station WFBM-TV carries President Harry S. Truman's address from San Francisco via AT&T's new microwave relay skyway.

=== Sports ===
- May 30 – The 1951 Indianapolis 500 is held at the Indianapolis Motor Speedway. Lee Wallard wins the race.

== Births ==
- May 4 – Jackie Jackson, American singer, songwriter, and member of The Jackson 5.
- October 7 – John Mellencamp, American singer-songwriter and musician.

== See also ==
- 1951 in the United States
