= Richmond, Indiana, facility fire =

2023 plastics processing facility fire in Richmond, Indiana

Richmond, Indiana facility fire
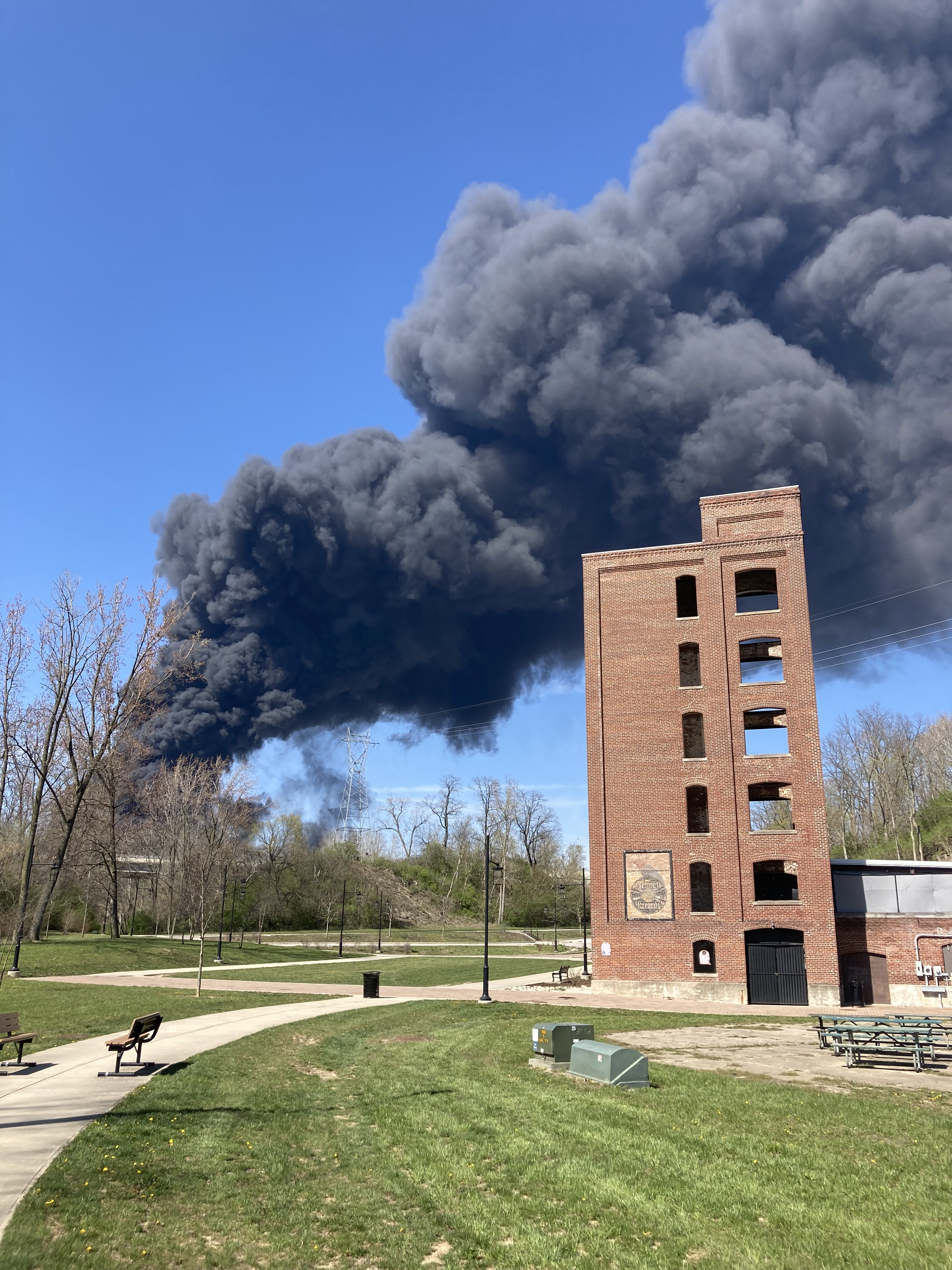
- Smoke from the fire as viewed from the Walk of Fame just south of the Starr–Gennett building
- Date: April 11–16, 2023 (Note: Containment date on April 16, 2023)
- Location: Richmond, Indiana, United States
- Coordinates: 39°50′15″N 84°54′20″W

Impacts
- Injuries: 2 firefighters

Ignition
- Cause: Semi-trailer catching on fire

Map
- Location of Richmond facility fire in Indiana

On the afternoon of April 11, 2023, a large-scale industrial fire impacted a recycling processing facility and its surrounding area in Richmond, Indiana, United States. The facility, a former industrial plant, had already been designated as a fire hazard after inflammable materials were located near the property line of the building; an excessive amount of plastic was stored at the facility as well. Additionally, the building had structural problems and numerous roof leaks, and one of the facility buildings did not have a fire sprinkler.

The fire began after a semi-trailer carrying plastic materials behind the building became engulfed in flames, prompting response from emergency management agencies, including the Indiana State Police. An evacuation was ordered for nearly 2,000 people outside of the facility fire area, and a car show was postponed in Preble County, Ohio, after debris from the fire was found there. Two firefighters sustained injuries, including one who injured his ankle after a fall down a ravine. The fire was contained on April 16, six days after it started. In its aftermath, the United States Environmental Protection Agency and Indiana Department of Environmental Management evaluated hazards from the facility fire, and the former agency took samples from the fire in May 2023 that contained asbestos, benzene, and lead.

== Background ==
The facility in Richmond was a former Hoffco/Comet Industrial plant which closed in 2009. The building was later renamed My Way Trading Warehouse, and plastic materials were contained there. The building was previously cited for numerous violations by Richmond's Unsafe Building Commission starting in 2019, due to numerous roof leaks and structural problems. Additionally, the facility was also described as a fire hazard after inflammable materials were in close proximity to the property line. The building also had a disproportionately large amount of plastic being stored, and a fire sprinkler system was not included at one of the facility buildings. There were a few minor fire-code violations at the facility as well. According to Seth Smith, who owned the recycling company of the facility—then named Cornerstone Trading Group—at that time, the auction company that sold the land to him allegedly had destroyed the fire sprinkler system of that building prior to the ownership change.

Following the Unsafe Building Commission's findings, Smith filed an appeal in November 2019 seeking judicial review of the findings. The Wayne Circuit Court affirmed the commission's orders and found that the evidence established that the site was a fire hazard "unsafe to people and property". Smith was given 90 days to eliminate fire and other safety hazards on the property.

The City of Richmond seized two of the three land parcels at the facility in 2022 after Smith did not pay his property taxes.

== Fire ==
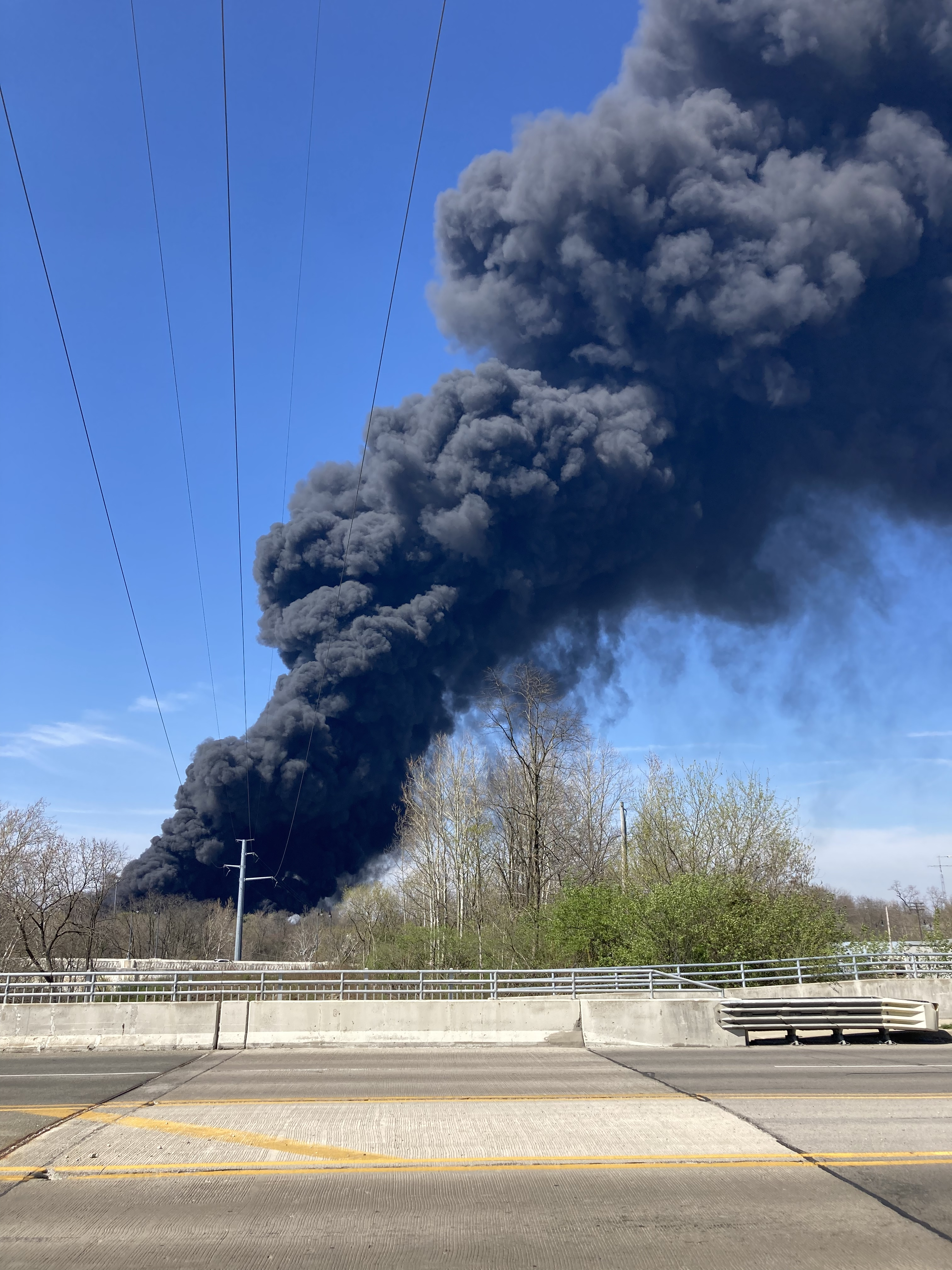
View of the fire from the South A Street bridge at 3:52 PM local time on April 11, 2023

The fire occurred on Tuesday, April 11, 2023, around 3 p.m. EDT, when a semi-trailer carrying plastics behind the recycling processing facility was engulfed in flames. Numerous emergency responders, including the Indiana State Police and sheriff departments from Richmond, Indiana and Wayne County, Indiana, assisted with evacuations. Described as "serious" and "large-scale" by Richmond mayor Dave Snow, the fire prompted an evacuation/shelter in place order for areas 0.5 miles (0.8 km) outside of the incident area, which included nearly 2,000 people. As a result of the smoke stemming from the fire, Randolph and Wayne counties were under alerts for poor air qualities. The situation became more problematic after some bystanders moved closer to the fire with explosions occurring at the same time.

Easterly winds blew smoke across the Indiana–Ohio border approximately one hour after the fire began. Smoke was spotted as far away as Connersville, Indiana, and Oxford, Ohio. Debris from the fire was found as far as New Paris, Ohio, and other portions of Preble County, which postponed a car show. Additionally, the fire was spotted from satellite images, weather radars, and traffic cameras. Two firefighters were injured, including one who sustained a minor injury to his ankle after a fall down a ravine.

== Aftermath ==
The United States Environmental Protection Agency (EPA) and the Indiana Department of Environmental Management (IDEM) evaluated hazards that resulted from the fire several hours after it began. The piles of plastic scattered across roads made it difficult for first responders and emergency management to access the fire site. The Wayne County Emergency Management Agency requested assistance from other nearby agencies. The Richmond Community School District canceled all classes on April 12 until April 18, and virtual classes were held by the Ivy Tech Community College of Indiana in Richmond as well. A nearby church was designated as a temporary shelter. The evacuation order was later lifted on April 16, and residents within the 0.5-mile (0.8 km) radius of the site were allowed to return to their homes.

On April 20, 2023, a class action lawsuit was filed against Smith and the Cornerstone Trading Group by two Richmond residents and a business, who were seeking $25,000 in damages along with legal fees. In July, Dave Snow, mayor of Richmond, Indiana, and city attorney Andrew Sickman were subpoenaed as third party defendants after a 19-point dismissal was filed by Smith and his attorneys implicating that city of Richmond was liable for the fire based on ownership of the property. The lawsuit was moved to a federal court in March 2024, and in September 2025, the court granted approval for the class action status of the suit.

The EPA took 54 debris and soil samples around one month after the fire containing asbestos, benzene, and lead, which were confirmed three months later. The samples were published in a study by the agency, which also showed that higher levels of chloroform and volatile organic compounds were present, along with other chemicals. Higher than normal levels of metals, including aluminium and zinc, were also detected.

On July 3, 2023, Cornerstone Trading Group, LLC. filed a lawsuit against the city of Richmond, which claimed that city officials, in 2021, were already aware of concerns of the building after obtaining it. The documents state that the fire happened on the property were buildings owned by the city and the company therefore did not "cause or contribute the release of any hazardous substances", nor were they liable for the incident.

The EPA began removing debris from the site of the fire around seven months after it began, which cost $3.3 million. The cleanup of hazardous materials, which included the removal of over 6,000 tonnes (13,000,000 lb) of debris and 850 tonnes (1,870,000 lb) of steel, was completed in March 2024. The materials that were removed from the site were then transferred to a landfill mandated by the EPA. The cleanup of non-hazardous materials at the site were turned over to the city of Richmond.

On September 18, 2026, a federal jury ruled that the city of Richmond and the business owner were liable. The jury found Cornerstone Trading Group LLC was 30% at fault, the business owner 30% at fault and the city of Richmond 40% at fault. The city of Richmond was ordered to pay $4,000 to the residents, while Cornerstone and the business owner were each ordered to pay $3,000.
