= Indiana Department of Environmental Management =

State government agency in Indiana

Agency overview
- Formed: 1 July 1986
- Jurisdiction: State of Indiana
- Website: https://www.in.gov/idem/

The Indiana Department of Environmental Management (IDEM) is the agency of the U.S. state of Indiana charged with protecting the environment and human health. There are many offices within IDEM and each has a specific role in environmental protection. According to the department's website, their mission is "to implement federal and state regulations to protect human health and the environment while allowing the environmentally sound operations of industrial, agricultural, commercial and government activities vital to a prosperous economy"

== History ==
The Indiana Department of Environmental Management was created with an act passed by the Indiana General Assembly and signed into law by Governor Robert D. Orr in 1985. This act moved pollution control efforts (Indiana Air Pollution Control Board, Indiana Stream Pollution Control Board and the Indiana Environmental Management Board) from the Indiana State Department of Health to the new agency on July 1, 1986.

== Organization ==
At the top of the organization is the Commissioner (presently Clint Woods), who reports directly to the Governor of Indiana. In addition to overseeing the department, the director also serves on an autonomous board known as the Environmental Rules Board, consisting of both government officials and citizen members, which meets monthly to address issues pertaining to environmental rules development as prescribed by state statute.

Beneath the Commissioner, there are four Assistant Commissioners and Chief of Staff and General Counsel, each of whom is responsible for a team under which many of the department's offices are organized.

In 2026 Indiana Governor, Mike Braun, signed a bill that deregulated the department, changing many of its responsibilities from required ("shall") to optional ("may").

== See also ==
- Climate change in Indiana
