= Sit Down Comedy with David Steinberg =

American talk show

- Created by: David Steinberg
- Written by: David Steinberg
- Directed by: Gregory McClatchy
- Presented by: David Steinberg
- Country of origin: United States
- Original language: English
- No. of seasons: 2
- No. of episodes: 12

Production
- Executive producer: David Steinberg
- Producer: Vincent Arcaro
- Camera setup: Multi-camera
- Running time: 45–48 minutes
- Production companies: Dark Light Pictures; TV Land

Original release
- Network: TV Land
- Release: December 14, 2005 – March 28, 2007

Sit Down Comedy with David Steinberg is an American talk show which aired on TV Land from 2005 to 2007. In it, comedian David Steinberg interviews comedians and comic actors.

== Content ==
The show is an informal interview-based talk show in which David Steinberg talks with comedians and comic actors. Each show features Steinberg and one guest. Mike Myers was the guest on the first episode; also among those appearing were Jon Lovitz, George Lopez, Bob Newhart, Larry David, and Martin Short.

== Critical reception ==
David Bianculli of the New York Daily News described the show as "amiable" and "comically conversational", noting that it had the potential to inform viewers on the art of comedy.
