= 2024 in Indiana =

- Decades: 2000s; 2010s; 2020s
- See also: History of Indiana; Historical outline of Indiana; List of years in Indiana; 2024 in the United States

The following is a list of events of the year 2024 in Indiana.

== Incumbents ==
=== State government ===
- Governor: Eric Holcomb (R)

== Events ==
- May 7 –
  - 2024 Indiana Republican presidential primary
  - 2024 Indiana Democratic presidential primary
- May 26 – 2024 Indianapolis 500: In auto racing, Josef Newgarden wins the Indianapolis 500 for the second consecutive year, becoming the first driver to do so since Hélio Castroneves in 2002.
- June 18 – Regan Smith breaks the 100 metres backstroke world record at the US Olympic Swimming Trials in Indianapolis.
- September 6 – A Piper PA-46 aircraft crashes into a cornfield after going into a nosedive in Anderson, killing all four occupants on board.
- December 18 – Indiana conducted its first execution since 2009 in December.

== See also ==
- 2024 in the United States
