= J. J. Paulsen =

American screenwriter

- Born: John James Paulsen; November 23, 1959 (age 66); New York City, U.S.
- Occupations: Screenwriter; television producer
- Spouse: Leanne Serrano

John James Paulsen (born November 23, 1959) is an American television writer and producer. He has written for several television programs including Cosby, In Living Color and Grace Under Fire.

In the spring of 2007 Paulsen was arrested for the murder of his wife, Leanne Serrano-Paulsen, after police found her body in the attic of their Carmel, Indiana home. Serrano-Paulsen's autopsy results indicated she died as a result of blunt force trauma to the head, and that she had been dead for two to three weeks prior to the discovery of her body. The couple had a history of domestic violence, and in January 2007 J.J. Paulsen pled guilty to domestic battery stemming from an incident the previous year.

On December 23, 2008, Paulsen pled guilty to voluntary manslaughter. On March 27 of the following year, Paulsen was sentenced to 26 years in prison He was incarcerated at the Miami Correctional Facility in Bunker Hill, Indiana and released early on September 12, 2016.

Margaret Cho, who knew Paulsen when he worked on her 1994–95 sitcom All American Girl, subsequently wrote a song about him.
