= 95 Miles to Go =

- 95 Miles to Go Poster
- Directed by: Tom Caltabiano
- Produced by: Tom Caltabiano; Ray Romano
- Starring: Ray Romano
- Cinematography: Roger Lay Jr.
- Edited by: Cheyenne Pesko
- Music by: Adam Gorgoni
- Distributed by: THINKFilm
- Release dates: October 16, 2004 (Deep Ellum Film Festival); April 7, 2006 (United States)
- Running time: 77 minutes
- Country: United States
- Language: English

95 Miles to Go is a 2004 comedy film directed by Tom Caltabiano. It stars Ray Romano, and documents his stand-up comedy tour of the South. The film premiered at the Deep Ellum Film Festival in October 2004 and released theatrically in the United States in April 2006 by THINKFilm. It premiered on HBO on July 10, 2007.

The DVD of the film was released on May 22, 2012, by Video Services Corporation, a film distribution company located in Toronto, Canada.
