= Cosby (TV series) =

American television sitcom (1996–2000)

- Genre: Sitcom
- Based on: One Foot in the Grave by David Renwick
- Developed by: Dennis Klein
- Directed by: John Whitesell (seasons 1–2 & 4); Don Scardino (seasons 2–4); John Bowab (season 2); Arthur Lewis (season 2)
- Starring: Bill Cosby; Phylicia Rashad; T'Keyah Crystal Keymáh; Doug E. Doug; Madeline Kahn; Jurnee Smollett; Darien Sills-Evans
- Theme music composer: Bill Cosby; Benny Golson
- Country of origin: United States
- Original language: English
- No. of seasons: 4
- No. of episodes: 96 (list of episodes)

Production
- Executive producers: Bill Cosby; Dennis Klein; Marcy Carsey; Tom Werner; Caryn Mandabach; David Renwick; Peter Tortorici; David Landsberg; Norman Steinberg; Tom Straw
- Producer: Joanne Curley-Kerner
- Production locations: Kaufman Astoria Studios; Astoria, New York, U.S.
- Camera setup: Videotape; Multi-camera
- Running time: 22 minutes
- Production company: Carsey-Werner Productions

Original release
- Network: CBS
- Release: September 16, 1996 – April 28, 2000

Cosby is an American television sitcom that aired on CBS from September 16, 1996, to April 28, 2000. The program starred Bill Cosby (in his final series) and Phylicia Rashad, who had previously co-starred in the NBC sitcom The Cosby Show (1984–1992). Madeline Kahn portrayed their neighborly friend, Pauline, until her death in 1999. The show was adapted from the British sitcom One Foot in the Grave.

== Premise ==
Set at the corner of 33rd Avenue and 1539 Blake Street in Astoria, Queens, the show starred Cosby as Hilton Lucas, a grumpy New York City man forced into early retirement from his job as an airline customer service agent. His wife Ruth was played by Phylicia Rashad, who had played Cosby's wife on The Cosby Show as well. Initially, Telma Hopkins was cast as Ruth Lucas; however, she was recast after she reacted poorly to Cosby's tendency to ad lib. The couple had one daughter, Erica Lucas, played by T'Keyah Crystal Keymáh. Doug E. Doug played Griffin Vesey, a foster son the Lucas family took in when he was younger. Griffin occasionally tried to win Erica's affections, although this ended in the third season when Erica became engaged to Darien Hall (played by Darien Sills-Evans), whom she married in the fourth season. Jurnee Smollett joined the cast in the third season as 11-year-old Jurnee, whom Hilton adored.

The show was based on the concept from the BBC series One Foot in the Grave, starring Richard Wilson and Annette Crosbie. David Renwick, the creator and writer of One Foot in the Grave, was listed as a consultant on Cosby. One Foot in the Grave was notable for containing dark humor for a mainstream sitcom. The tone was significantly lightened for Cosby, although certain controversial scenes, such as a scene in which the lead character incinerates a live tortoise, albeit by accident, were recreated.

When the show was under development for CBS, its working title was Not Dead Yet (a name later used for a 2023–2024 ABC sitcom). A pilot episode was produced under that name, featuring Glenn Plummer as Griffin Vessey and Audra McDonald as Erica Lucas. Cosby, Rashad and Kahn were the only cast members to survive the pilot episode. The unaired theme by Benny Golson was recorded as a jazz standard while congas and harmonica were later added for the uptempo salsa mix.

A notable episode was the fourth-season premiere, "My Spy", which showed Hilton watching an episode of I Spy (a 1960s series in which Cosby co-starred) and then dreaming an adventure with Robert Culp's character from that series; the episode ends with a brief dream sequence in which Rashad dreams she is playing her previous character from The Cosby Show. The same season also presented an episode entitled "Loving Madeline" which featured the standard opening credits for the series but was in fact a tribute to Kahn featuring the cast members out of character discussing the recently deceased actress, punctuated by clips from past episodes.

Cosby premiered to an audience of more than 24.7 million viewers, but averaged 16 million viewers during the course of the season. As the series progressed, ratings shrank and CBS, which had new hit comedies in Everybody Loves Raymond and The King of Queens, decided to move the series from Monday to Wednesday, then to the so-called Friday night death slot. The moves led to a drop in ratings. At the end of the fourth season, having accumulated 96 episodes, Cosby and CBS executive Les Moonves mutually decided to end the series. The 96th and last episode, "The Song Remains the Same", aired on April 28, 2000, and drew just over 7 million viewers.

== Episodes ==
| Season | Episodes | Originally released | |
| Season | Episodes | First released | Last released |
|---|---|---|---|
| 1 | 25 | September 16, 1996 | May 19, 1997 |
| 2 | 24 | September 15, 1997 | May 18, 1998 |
| 3 | 25 | September 21, 1998 | May 17, 1999 |
| 4 | 22 | September 29, 1999 | April 28, 2000 |

== Cast ==
=== Main ===
- Bill Cosby — Hilton Lucas
- Phylicia Rashad — Ruth Lucas
- T'Keyah Crystal Keymáh — Erica Lucas
- Doug E. Doug — Griffin Vesey
- Madeline Kahn — Pauline Fox
- Jurnee Smollett — Jurnee (season 3; recurring season 2)
- Darien Sills-Evans — Darien Hall (seasons 3–4)

=== Recurring ===
- Angelo Massagli — Angelo (season 2)
- Sinbad — Daniel (season 3)

== Reruns/syndication ==
The series was distributed by Carsey-Werner Distribution for broadcast syndication for the 2000–2001 television season, where it ran until the fall of 2004; after that point it was offered in low-cost barter arrangements. TBS shortly thereafter ran reruns of the series for about two years. In March 2010, Up TV (the current UP Network) began airing the show, but, as a family network with religious ownership, removed some episodes and edited some content in episodes to meet the network's mores. It began to air on Bounce TV in January 2015, but was removed from air on July 7, 2015, when records were made public regarding Bill Cosby's sexual assault cases. Two seasons are available through Hoopla.

== Nielsen ratings ==
Cosby was considered to be a ratings success for CBS, winning its time slot of Monday, 8:00 PM in households and viewers for the first three seasons.

| Season | TV Season | Timeslot (EST) | Season premiere | Season finale | Episodes | Rank | Viewers (in millions) |
|---|---|---|---|---|---|---|---|
| 1 | 1996–97 | Monday 8:00 pm | September 16, 1996 | May 19, 1997 | 25 | #21 | 16.0 |
| 2 | 1997–98 | Monday 8:00 pm | September 15, 1997 | May 18, 1998 | 24 | #28 | 13.8 |
| 3 | 1998–99 | Monday 8:00 pm | September 21, 1998 | May 17, 1999 | 25 | #35 | 12.5 |
| 4 | 1999–2000 | Wednesday 8:00 pm / Friday 8:30 pm | September 29, 1999 | April 28, 2000 | 21 | #82 | 8.4 |
