= Vincent Arcaro =

American film producer (born 1953)

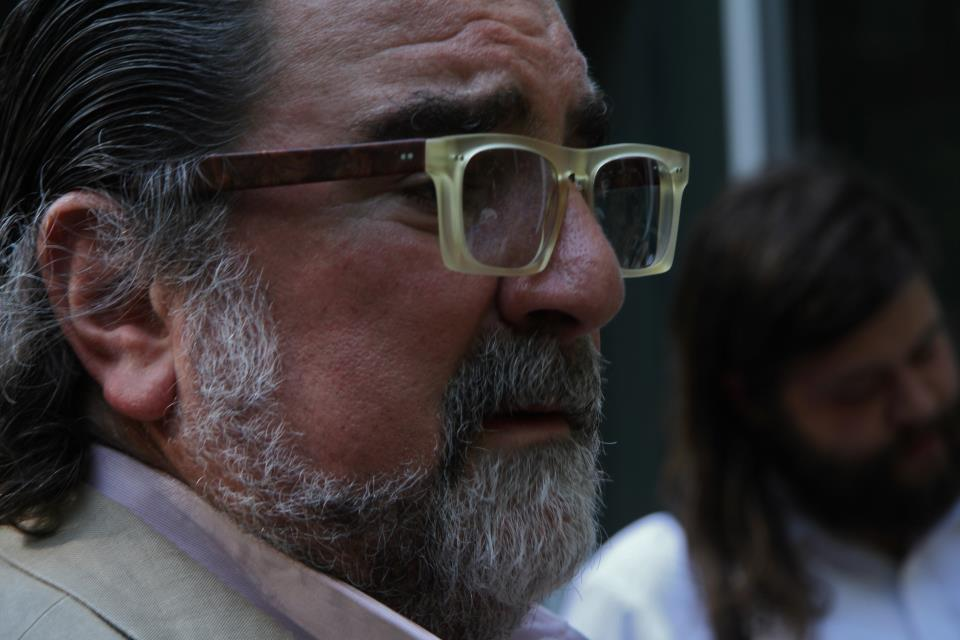
- Born: February 22, 1953 (age 73); Washington DC
- Education: Loyola University of New Orleans
- Occupations: Film, television, and commercial producer

Vincent Arcaro (born February 22, 1953) is an American film, television, and commercial producer based in Los Angeles. He is best known for executive producing some of the works of directors Caleb Deschanel, Michael Lehmann, Brad Silberling, Andy Garcia, and Conrad Hall.

== Early life and education ==
Vincent was born in Washington DC on February 22, 1953, George Washington's Birthday, in George Washington Memorial Hospital to Jennie and Joseph Arcaro. Joseph V Arcaro was the Vice President and Director of display Advertising at The Washington Post Company. Vincent lived with his two sisters and parents in Silver Spring, Maryland and Potomac, Maryland until he went to college in Louisiana where he attended Loyola University of New Orleans and got his BA in Communications Arts.

== Career ==
After school, Vincent moved to Hollywood in 1976 and started working as a messenger at Kaleidoscope Films, a major player in the motion picture marketing industry since it was started in 1968 by Andrew J. Kuehn. Vincent soon advanced to head of production at Kaleidoscope, where he met his future business partner Caleb Deschanel. After leaving Kaleidoscope, Vincent produced for filmmaker Joe Pytka and at Angel City Productions for Caleb Deschanel. In 1994, Arcaro and Deschanel formed Dark Light Pictures.

At Dark Light, Vincent produced content for influential brands including The Coca-Cola Company, Budweiser, The University of Southern California, Reebok, AT&T, UPS, Perrier, Nestle, Burger King, Paramount Pictures, and Martell Cognac.

== Personal life ==
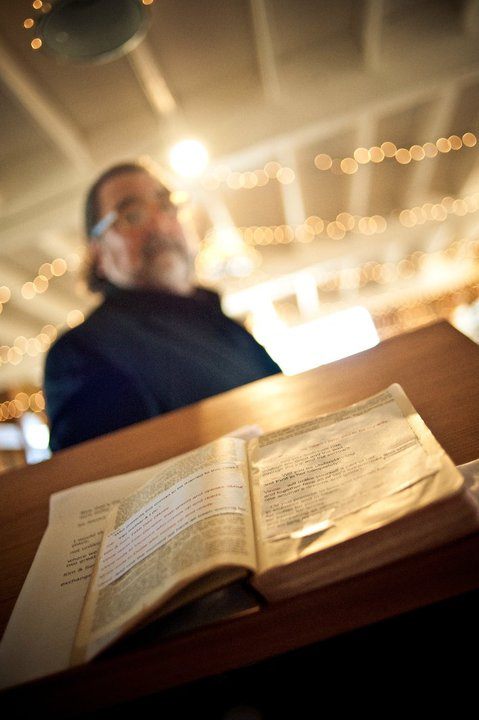

Vincent Married Jan Hicks in 1982 and they have two daughters, Alexis (b. 1983), a baker and Sloane (b. 1987), a camera operator. Vincent and Jan reside in Los Angeles with their four dogs.

== Affiliations ==
Vincent is a member of the Directors Guild of America and also has sat on the Monterey County Film Commission.
