= Mary Birdsall House =

Historic house in Indiana, United States

- U.S. National Register of Historic Places
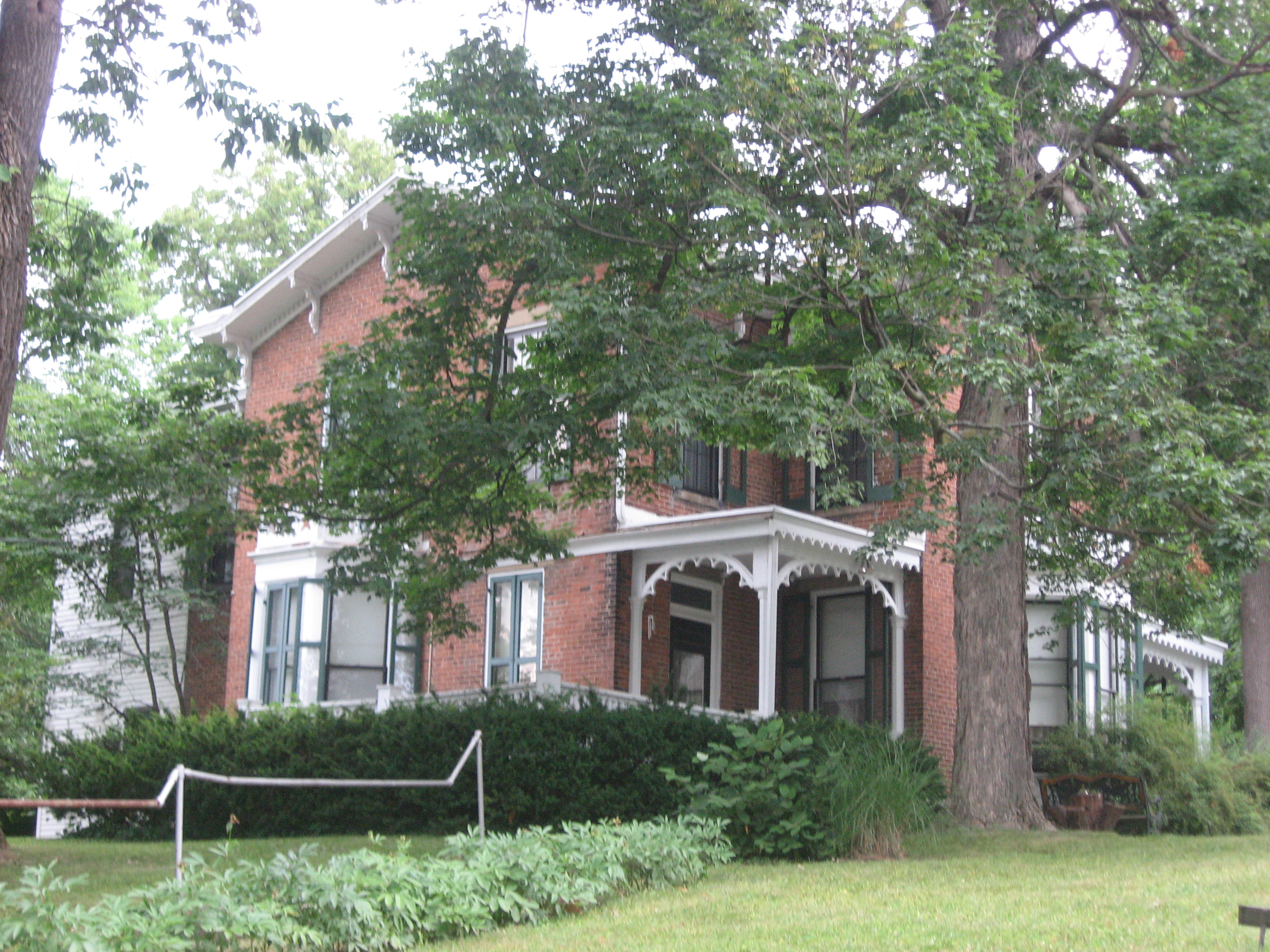

- Location within Indiana Location within the United States
- Location: 504 NW Fifth Street, Richmond, Indiana
- Coordinates: 39°50′5″N 84°54′31″W
- Built: 1859
- Architectural style: Italianate
- NRHP reference No.: 99001155
- Added to NRHP: September 23, 1999

The Mary Birdsall House is known as the Lauramoore Guest House & Retreat Center and is located in Richmond, Indiana. It was built in 1859 for Thomas and Mary Birdsall, a leading woman's suffragist in Indiana. The Italianate brick-built house is a two-story structure standing at the corner of Northwest Fifth Street and Richmond Avenue. In 1927, the Whitewater Monthly Meeting Religious Society of Friends converted the building to a retirement home, adding on a two-story addition on the west and north sides of the building. Later, the property was given to Earlham College, and it now serves as a guest house and retreat center. It was listed on the National Register of Historic Places in 1999.

== Design ==
Construction of the house began in 1859. The house now known as the Lauramoore Guest House & Retreat Center (Mary Birdsall House) was built for Mary Birdsall (née Thistlethwaite) and her husband from bricks made in a kiln to the north of the house. The Italianate low-pitched roofed dwelling was completed in 1861. The architect designed a cross-shaped floor plan whose foundations included a stone cellar. The four wings of the cruciform layout incorporate American bond brickwork and cornices that are both bracketed and dentilated. All of the wings have separate staircases and chimneys, but it is the east room which is thought to have been the more formal area. This room is closest to Northwest Fifth Street and the house's entry vestibule. The first floor of the house was built on a grander scale than the second, with three-sided bay window extensions in both the east and west wings. It is said that the house design was "technologically progressive, healthy, and emancipating", reflecting the concept of "domestic architecture" advocated by Catharine Beecher and Harriet Beecher Stowe. Mary Birdsall had collaborated with Beecher and Stowe in her work for social change. Over thirty years after Mary Birdall died, the house became a retirement home. Her house was substantially modified when additional rooms were added in 1927. These new bedrooms had a new staircase and were located on the east and north parts of the building.

== Operation ==
The house was a private residence until 1927. The Birdsalls owned the house until 1899, although they had rented out the house for some years after their move to Philadelphia. The house was sold to Charles and Laura Moore after Mary's sudden death in 1894. The Whitewater Monthly Meeting Religious Society of Friends, which Mary Birdsall had supported, bought the house in 1927 and converted it into a retirement home and prayer meeting site (services were held in the parlor). The society extended the building, adding bedrooms, a kitchen, and backstairs. Its plans to build a free-standing meeting house on the east side of the property were never realized. The Lauramoore Retirement Home was privately incorporated in 1951 and operated until 2010. The company that owned the building then gifted it to Earlham College. Today, the Mary Birdsall house is called the Lauramoore Guest House & Retreat Center, and it also hosts visitors to Earlham College.

== Significance ==
The house was added to the National Register of Historic Places as a property "associated with events that have made a significant contribution to the broad patterns of our history" and one "associated with the lives of a persons significant in our past". Mary Birdsall lived in the home during the peak of her political and social activist contributions. Birdsall was the women's editor for the Indiana Farmer magazine until she bought The Lily in 1855 from Amelia Bloomer. Birdsall was said to be solid on the issues of temperance and women's rights, which were the core values of The Lily. The Lily was a nationally published magazine that focused on women's rights, women's suffrage, and temperance. In 1858, Birdsall served as secretary of the Indiana Women's Rights Convention, which was held in Richmond, and on January 19, 1859, she was one of the first three women (with Mary Thomas and Agnes Cook) to address the Indiana state legislature. The Civil War soon overtook many of the social issues that Birdsall was associated with in the 1860s, but both Thomas and Mary continued to campaign for temperance and suffrage causes until Mary's death in 1894. Thomas, a successful businessman who was an active supporter of the Richmond's temperance society, died in 1901.
