= Mary Birdsall =

American journalist

- Born: Mary B. Thistlethwaite; 1828; Chester, Pennsylvania, U.S.
- Died: February 1, 1894 (aged 65-66); Philadelphia, Pennsylvania, U.S.
- Resting place: Earlham Cemetery
- Known for: Suffragist
- Spouse: Thomas Birdsall (married 1848-1894)
- Children: 3, including William W. Birdsall (1

Mary B. Birdsall (née Thistlethwaite; born 1828, Chester, Pennsylvania – died February 1, 1894, Philadelphia) was an American suffragette, temperance worker, and journalist.

Born to English immigrants, she grew up on a farm near Richmond, Indiana, where she married Thomas Birdsall in 1848. They had three sons together. She began her journalism career as the woman's editor at the Indiana Farmer newspaper. For about five years she owned The Lily, a newspaper for women, which she purchased from suffragist Amelia Bloomer in 1854. She helped organize the second women's rights convention in Indiana. At that Indiana convention in 1852, she was elected as secretary for the newly-formed Indiana Woman's Rights Association (renamed the Indiana Woman's Suffrage Association (IWSA) in 1869, and eventually became president of the organization. Birdsall was a vice-president at the fourth National Women's Rights Convention in Cleveland, Ohio, in 1853. She was among the first three women to address the Indiana legislature in 1859 to present a women's rights petition, speaking for a half-hour in support of women's suffrage.

Birdsall died in Philadelphia in 1894 and interred at Earlham Cemetery in Richmond. Her Richmond home, a model of progressive architecture as espoused by Catherine Beecher, was listed on the National Register of Historic Places in 1999.

== Early life and family background ==
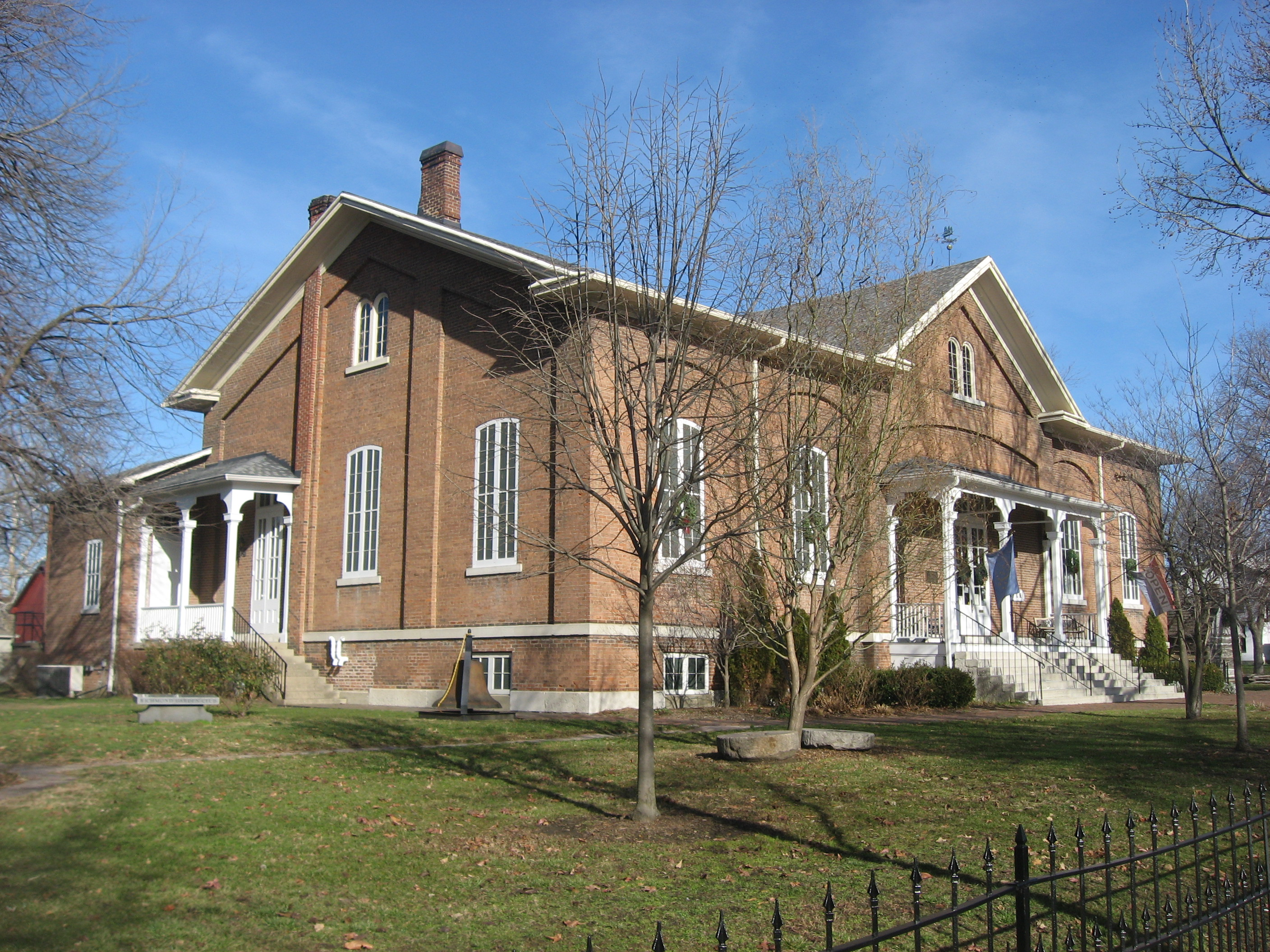
Formerly the Hicksite Friends Meetinghouse on North A Street, Richmond, Indiana. Built in 1865. Currently the Wayne County Historical Museum.

Mary B. Thistlethwaite was born in 1828 in Chester, Delaware County, Pennsylvania. She was the sixth of eight children (two girls and six boys). Her father, William Thistlethwaite, a farmer, was born in Aysgarth, Wensleydale, Yorkshire. He married Elizabeth Wetherald about 1814 and they lived in Boynton Parish. The Thistlethwaites emigrated to America in 1817 with their first two children. The family lived a short time in Delaware, before settling in Chester. They stayed briefly in Cincinnati after Mary's birth, where William Thistlethwaite worked as a butcher. The family finally moved to Richmond, Indiana, in 1829, settling on a farm just west of town in 1830. William Thistlethwaite bought and sold several large farms and ran them successfully. Mary's older sister, Eleanor, never married nor had children. Their brother, Timothy, owned various mills in Wayne County, and their brother, William, Jr., purchased the Democratic Herald, a Richmond newspaper, in 1871. Some of the family's ancestors were active in the Society of Friends (Quakers). William Thistlethwaite was a member of the North A Street Meeting in Richmond.

== Marriage and children ==
On October 26, 1848, at age 19, Birdsall married a farmer and fellow Quaker, Thomas Birdsall, at the Whitewater Monthly Meeting in Richmond. The year after their marriage, the Birdsalls moved briefly to Chester, Clinton County, Ohio, where Thomas's family lived. About 1859, Thomas Birdsall went to work for his brother-in-law, Timothy Thistlethwaite, in his flour mill for about four years. Thomas Birdsall also partnered with the Thistlethwaite family in constructing a three-story commercial building in downtown Richmond at the corner of Main and Front Streets.

Mary and Thomas Birdsall were the parents of three sons. Their eldest son, Alvin T. Birdsall, was born there in 1849 and died at age 25 in Brooklyn, New York, where he was working as a dry-goods salesman. He left a widow, Mathilda "Mattie" (Hampton) Birdsall. Mattie, who returned to Indiana, remained close to her mother-in-law, even making extended visits to Birdsall in Philadelphia in the 1880s. Their second son, William Wilfred Birdsall (b. 1854), was an educator, author/editor, and for a time, president of Swarthmore College. He married Viola McDill in 1881 and they had three sons, likely Birdsall's only grandchildren. Hubert H. Birdsall (b. 1856), like his older brothers, attended Earlham College in Richmond and was later a journalist in Philadelphia. He married Ella J. Vandyke in Delaware in 1884. Ella, a Catholic, died of fever in 1898. What happened to Hubert after her death is unknown. William and Hubert were born in Indiana.

== Journalism career ==
=== Indiana Farmer ===
D. P. Holloway and W. T. Dennis established the Indiana Farmer newspaper in Richmond in 1851. According to their masthead, they devoted the paper to "agriculture, horticulture, mechanics, and the useful arts." In October 1852, the editors established a "Ladies' Department" and Birdsall was hired to edit the section. She lost no time in promoting a feminist agenda. The section also concerned home economics and agricultural items, such as reporting on the State Fair. Birdsall encouraged her female readers to support women-owned newspapers, such as The Genius of Liberty, published by Elizabeth A. Aldrich in Cincinnati. Birdsall editorialized and published stories urging women to improve their minds and find challenging professions, which she believed would contribute to the betterment of their families, rather than detracting from their roles as wives and mothers. Her tenure at the newspaper, while being well-received, was brief, ending in March 1853. The Indiana Farmer's tenure in Richmond was also brief. It was sold and moved to Indianapolis.

=== The Lily ===
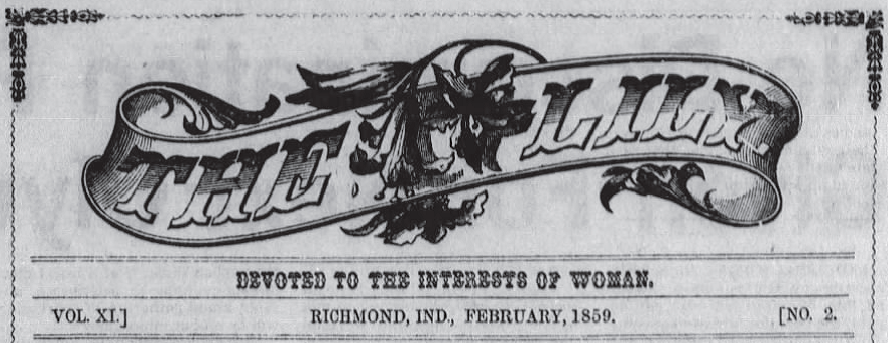
The February 1859 masthead for The Lily, published in Richmond, Indiana.

About 1848, the newly formed women's temperance society in Seneca Falls, New York, decided they wish to promote their cause with a local newspaper of their own device. They formed a committee to name and construct the paper, but soon lost heart in the enterprise. Amelia Bloomer, however, was determined to carry it through and took over the paper, editorially and financially. The paper was probably the first one focused on women and entirely published and edited by women. The temperance committee chair had chosen the name, The Lily, to represent its purity motive. Bloomer never cared for it, but didn't feel right about changing it, so the name remained. At first, the paper's focus was strictly temperance, but Bloomer soon began promoting women's rights. Circulation expanded greatly after her proposals on dress reform. The introduction of Turkish pantaloons and a short skirt that became widely known as "bloomers" made national news. When Bloomer and her husband moved from Seneca Falls to Ohio, the paper went with them. However, when they decided to move to Council Bluffs, Iowa, far from any means of distribution, Bloomer decided to sell the paper.

Bloomer attended the National Women's Rights Convention in 1853, in which Birdsall also participated. Bloomer visited Richmond, Indiana, on an extension of that trip, giving her ample opportunity to meet Birdsall. Bloomer sold the paper to Birdsall in late 1854 and Birdsall first appeared as editor and proprietor in January 1855. Birdsall was assisted by Mary F. Thomas, another Richmond resident and suffragist who later became city physician. Thomas edited the paper in Birdsall's place throughout 1857. The pair continued to publish feminist and suffragist articles until at least 1859. In 1976, a copy of the second February 1859 edition came to light when it was sold to the Richmond Palladium-Item by Arthur Whalen's estate. Birdsall was still listed as the editor in that issue.

During the time Birdsall was associated with the Indiana Farmer and The Lily, these two semi-monthly publications had circulations of about 3,000.

== Activism ==
=== Indiana women's rights conventions ===
Like many Quakers, the Birdsalls were active in a number of social reform movements including temperance, suffrage, and abolition. At an anti-slavery meeting held at Greensboro in Henry County, Indiana, Amanda Way proposed a resolution to hold the first Indiana women's rights convention, which the assembly adopted and appointed Way to chair the committee. The first convention took place on October 14–15, 1851, at the old United Brethren Church in Dublin, Indiana, with Birdsall serving as secretary for the convention. The second convention was held the following October in Richmond, which Birdsall helped to organize. At that gathering, both she and her husband signed the organizational papers and constitution to form the Woman's Rights Association of Indiana. Birdsall was elected secretary, a position she held for several more years.

The attendees at the second convention discussed and passed more than a dozen resolutions pertaining to "elevating" women to equal status with men. They argued that citizenship was a moral and mental condition and that women were, in that sense, the same as men. They wanted women to receive the same education as men, in the same institutions. They encouraged all women to pursue an occupation to support themselves, rather than relying on men, for which they should receive equal pay for equal work. Birdsall wrote and submitted the convention minutes to several newspapers for publication.

Birdsall served as one of a group of vice presidents at the fourth National Women's Rights Convention that was held in Cleveland, Ohio, in 1853. The 1854 Indiana women's rights convention moved from Richmond to the capital city, Indianapolis, Indiana, and was held in Masonic Hall, where the local press regarded it with disdain. In 1855, the convention met at Washington Hall in Indianapolis and attracted national members of the suffrage movement, including James and Lucretia Mott, who spoke at the convention, as did Ernestine L Rose. In 1858, the convention returned to Richmond, largely due to Birdsall's efforts, and it was during this meeting that members of the group composed a petition to the Indiana General Assembly advocating women's rights. At the ninth convention in 1859, Birdsall was elected president of the association. The Civil War pushed suffrage and women's rights out of view, and the next convention was not held in Indiana until 1869, when the organization was renamed the Indiana Woman's Suffrage Association.

=== Address to the Indiana General Assembly ===
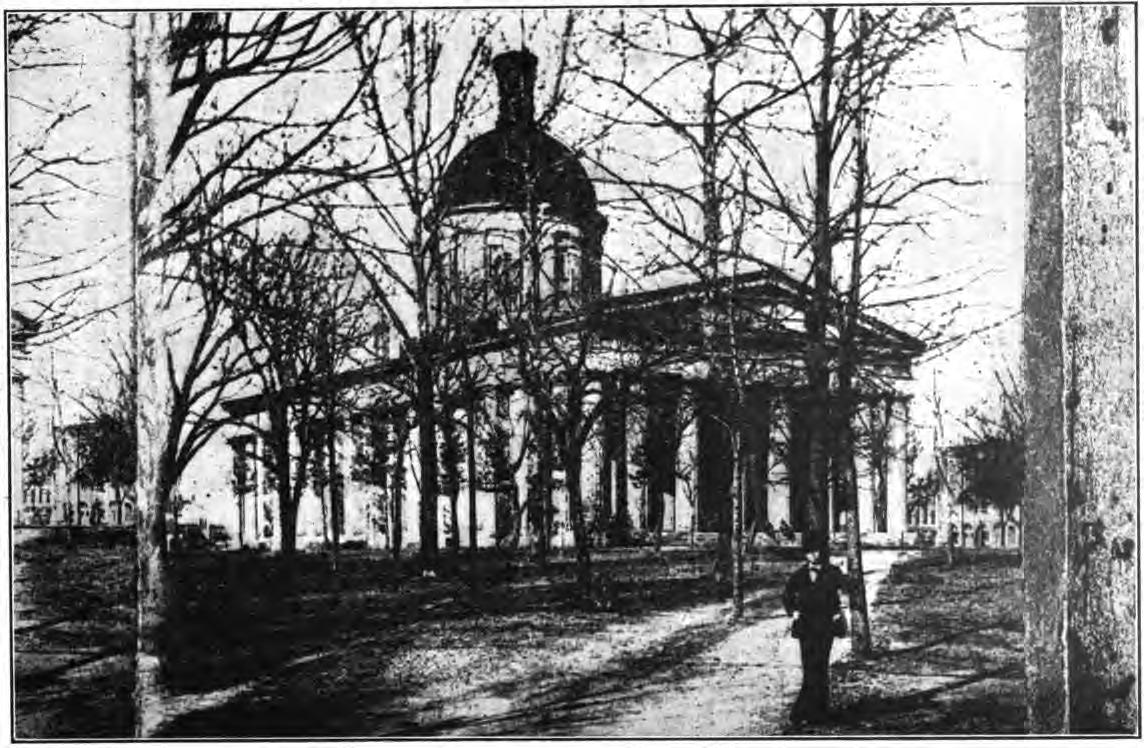
Indiana statehouse: construction begun in 1831; demolished in 1877. Mary F. Thomas, Mary Birdsall and Agnes Cook presented the 1859 Women's Rights Petition here.

On January 19, 1859, the House and the Senate convened in a rare joint session of the state legislature. The Speaker of the House initially had difficulty moving through the large crowd, which included many women, to convene the meeting and many legislators had to stand during the presentation. Mary F. Thomas, Birdsall, and Agnes Cook, who had been given seats at the Speaker's table, presented a petition for women's rights, becoming the first women to address the state legislature. More than one thousand individuals signed the petition, including women residents and legal male voters of Wayne County. Following Cook's brief introductions, Thomas, who noted the large, boisterous crowd, urged the assembly to take the forthcoming presentation seriously before reading the petition aloud. The petition was brief and requested simply that women be granted equal property rights and suffrage.

Birdsall spoke next, addressing the session for about a half hour. Her speech was described as "a clear and logical plea in behalf of the right of suffrage in woman". Only Thomas's address and the petition were published, despite the legislative resolution that the addresses of both women would be printed. No known copy of Birdsall's address exists, but detailed information about the presentation was published in the February 1859 issue of The Lily.

Birdsall avowed that no permanent improvement in women's condition could ever occur without equal rights, pointing out that "if from time to time there appears a woman rising above traditional prejudice and accumulated obstacles, she must be looked upon as an example of what might oftener have been done under justice". She also pointed out that any "inferior" female characteristics were actually caused by lack of opportunity for women in education and employment, not the reason for it, and the only way to ensure self-protection was through the right to vote.

Cook concluded their remarks, describing how enfranchised women would be more effective in the cause of temperance. After Cook finished her presentation, the joint session resolved into a committee of the whole to discuss adding the petition to the legislative agenda, after which the meeting was adjourned and members of the Indiana Senate retired to their own chamber. Although there had been some measure of decorum throughout the proceedings, once concluded, the men began loudly ridiculing the entire notion of women's rights. The mockery continued in the press.

The following day, the Senate committee assigned to consider the petition decided to take no further action on the matter. The House agreed. Although the legislature did not grant women their request for voting and property rights, the three suffragists' efforts paved the way for other Hoosier women to fight for the vote by addressing the legislature. Amanda Way and Emma Swank, who were instrumental in the 1859 legislative effort, addressed the state legislature in 1871.

== Mary Birdsall House ==
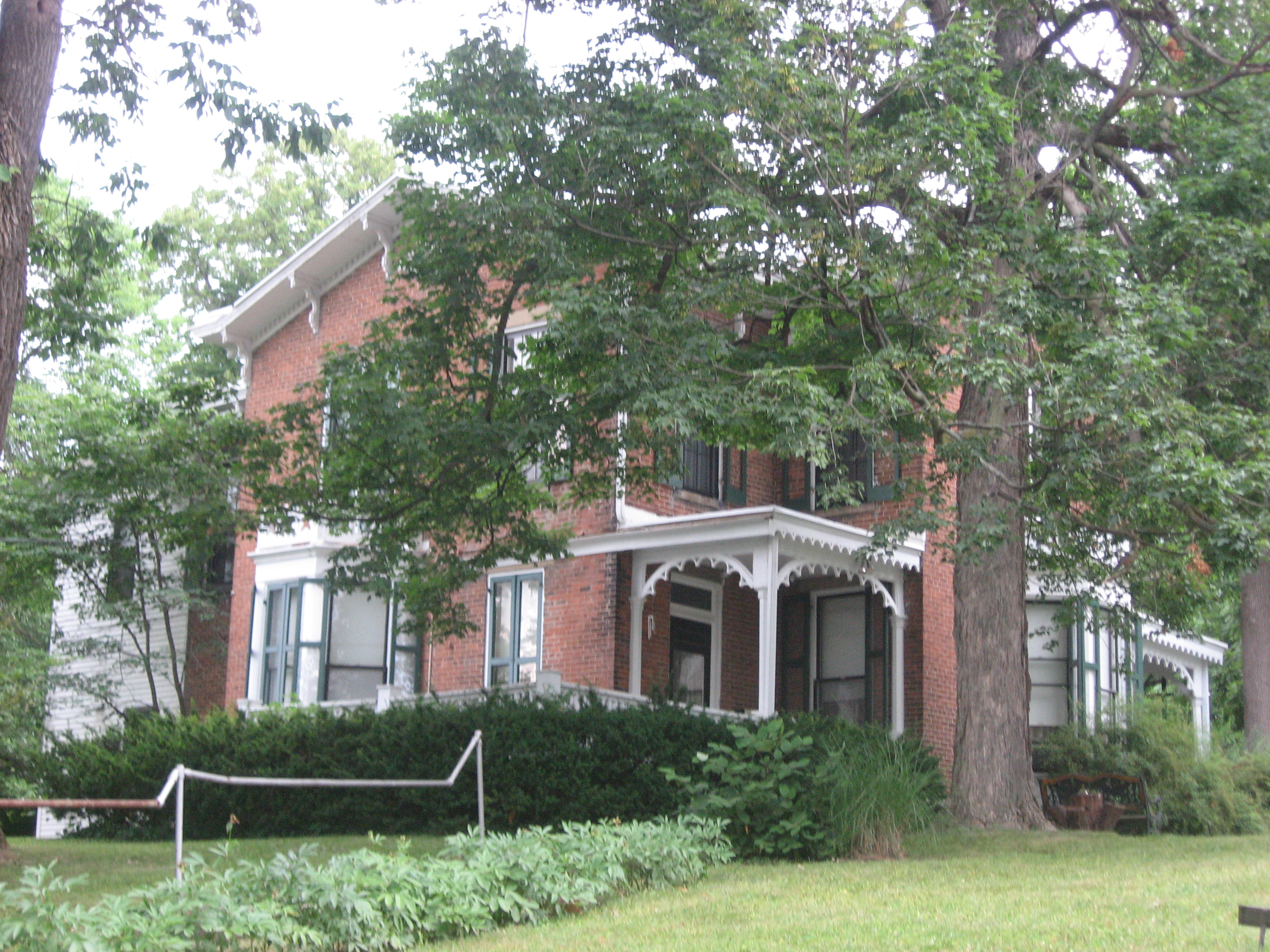
The Mary Birdsall House in Richmond, Indiana.

Construction of the Mary Birdsall House, as it came to be known, began in 1859 and was completed in 1860. The Birdsalls called the home "Brightbank." The Italianate house is located on a large lot at the northwest corner of West Fifth Street and Richmond Avenue in Richmond, Indiana. The builders used bricks from the Thistlethwaite brick yard on an adjacent property. The two-story, cruciform house is remarkably similar to a plan published in 1872 by Catherine Beecher and Harriett Beecher Stowe in their book, American Woman's Home. The book promoted a scientific approach to home design The Birdsall's son, William W., acquired the home in 1896. The house was sold to Charles and Laura Moore in 1899.

Trustees of the Whitewater Monthly Meeting, Religious Society of Friends, acquired the house in 1927 and named it Lauramoore for the previous owner. They used it as a retirement home for the elderly and as a temporary meeting place for worship after selling their meeting place on North A Street. The society extended the building by adding bedrooms, a kitchen, and back stairs. The Lauramoore Home was privately incorporated in 1951 as a non-sectarian retirement home. Earlham College assumed ownership of Lauramoore in December 2010 as a gift from the retirement home company. The house, now known as the Lauramoore Guest House and Retreat Center, also hosts visitors to the college. In 1999 it was listed on the National Register of Historic Places. In 2012, a plaque honoring Birdsall was placed on the Lauramoore property in a ceremony that included John Thistlethwaite, one of Birdsall's relatives.

== Later life ==
Birdsall continued her community service activities through a committee of women who formed the Union Relief Association. This organization was founded to aid the destitute by finding them employment, and they established a home for orphans and other needy children. Thomas Birdsall was also active in the community. He met with other temperance-minded male citizens of Richmond in August 1867 to form the Richmond Temperance Society and was elected to serve as its president.

Though she had a long association with the Society of Friends, Birdsall stopped attending meetings around 1869. When the Whitewater Monthly Meeting inquired about her absence in the summer of 1872, she reported that she no longer felt connected with the religion. When they proposed to disown her, she consented and the break was formalized in August. She had the right to appeal, but never did so. Thomas Birdsall and their son, William, retained their membership and formally requested a transfer to a meeting in Philadelphia in 1886.

The Birdsalls were living in Philadelphia, Pennsylvania, at the time of the 1880 census. They advertised Brightbank for rent in October 1883. In Philadelphia, Thomas Birdsall ran an agricultural supply business, partnering with his sons, Hubert and William, though they had other business pursuits. Thomas Birdsall retained property in Richmond and traveled back and forth between Philadelphia and his home town, based on reports in the Richmond newspapers.

Mary Birdsall died suddenly in Philadelphia on February 1, 1894; her remains were returned for burial in Richmond. Her funeral was originally scheduled to be held in her home, but at the last minute the service was moved to her brother Timothy's home. Thomas Birdsall spent his later years in a Society of Friends old-age home in Bucks County, Pennsylvania. He died August 10, 1901, and was buried beside Birdsall.
