= Amelia Bloomer House =

Historic house in New York, United States

- U.S. National Register of Historic Places
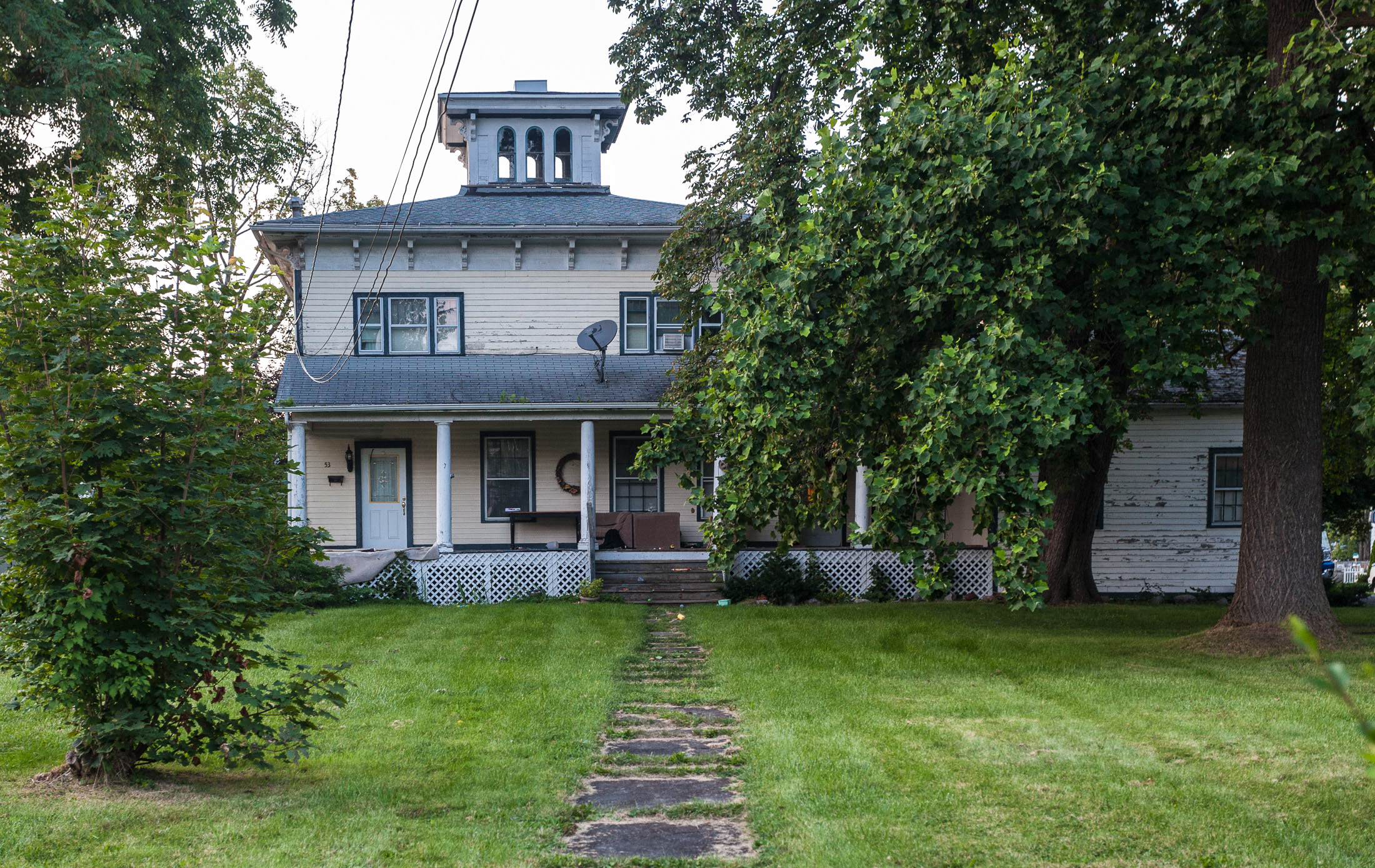

- Location within New York Location within the United States
- Location: 53 E. Bayard St., Seneca Falls, New York
- Coordinates: 42°54′35″N 76°47′27″W
- Area: 65 acres (26 ha)
- Built: 1847
- Architects: Latham Bros., Builders & Contractors
- Architectural style: Italianate
- MPS: Women's Rights Historic Sites TR
- NRHP reference No.: 80000359
- Added to NRHP: August 29, 1980

The Amelia Bloomer House is a historic home located at Seneca Falls in Seneca County, New York.

== Description and history ==
It is a two-story, Italianate style frame dwelling built originally in 1830 and modified to its present style in the 1850s. In 1945, the house was modified to be a multiple dwelling. The home is notable as the residence of temperance advocate and women's rights leader Amelia Bloomer. It is also reputed to have been a stop on the Underground Railroad.

It was listed on the National Register of Historic Places on August 29, 1980.
