= Indiana Woman's Suffrage Association =

Suffrage organization in Indiana

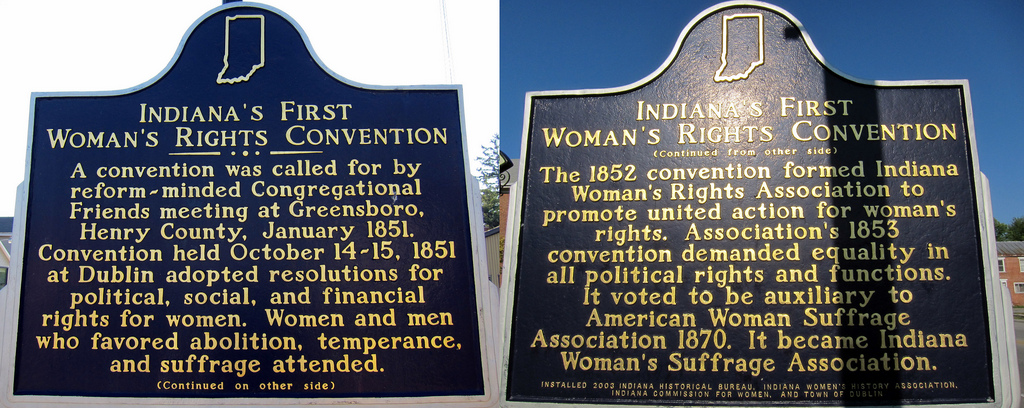
This sign was installed in Dublin, IN in 2003 by Indiana Historical Bureau, Indiana Women's History Association, Indiana Commission for Women, and Town of Dublin.

The Indiana Woman's Suffrage Association (IWSA) began on October 15, 1851, in Dublin, Wayne County, Indiana. IWSA was created for men and women to fight for women's right to vote. The association held annual conventions for 26 years. People traveled from all over the state to find resolutions for the political, social, and financial inequalities for women. The ISWA was first referred to as American Woman Suffrage Association.

== History ==
The Indiana Women's Suffrage Association, originally organized as the Indiana Women's Rights Association (IWRA) grew out of an initial meeting held in Dublin, Wayne County, Indiana on October 15. 1851. By the second meeting, held in 1852 in Richmond, Indiana, IWRA had established four committees dealing with "women’s labor & remuneration; women’s legal conditions; women’s social position; and women’s education." Frequent speakers at these early meetings were suffragists, Francis Dana Gage, Lucretia Mott, and Ernestine Rose. In January 1859, Dr. Mary F Thomas, Agnes Cook, and Mary Birdsall, publicly spoke to the Indiana General Assembly and presented a petition asking for equal property rights and the vote. IWRA did not hold meetings between 1860 and 1869.

In 1869, members renamed the organization the Indiana Women's Suffrage Association (IWSA) and refocused its efforts on obtaining suffrage. Susan B Anthony and Lucy Stone spoke at the 1870 meeting and the IWSA affiliated with the American Woman Suffrage Association. IWSA again presented a petition to the Indiana General Assembly in 1873. Disagreements arose between Helen Gougar, president of IWSA, and other Indiana suffrage leaders over the focus of the association. While meetings were held after 1884, minutes do not exist, and the organization appears to have dissolved by 1899. Other suffrage groups organized including the Indiana State Suffrage Association (1899), and later the Indiana Equal Suffrage Association (1906), and the Woman's Franchise League of Indiana (1911).

== The Constitution ==
=== Article I ===
This society shall be known by the name of the Indiana Woman's ~~Rights~~ Suffrage Association.

=== Article II ===
The officers of this society shall consist of a president, vice president, corresponding and recording secretaries and treasurer, whose duties shall be such as devolve upon such stations, and they shall be elected annually.

=== Article III ===
The Secretary, further, shall be requested to report annually upon the general condition of woman and the efforts made for her elevation.

=== Article IV ===
Persons shall be appointed at each annual meeting to report upon each of the following subjects: Woman's Labor and Remuneration, Woman's Legal Condition; Woman's Social Position, and Woman's education.

=== Article V ===
This society shall meet annually at such time and place as shall hereafter be determined upon.

=== Article VI ===
This society does advise the organization of District societies throughout the State.

=== Article VII ===
The constitution may be altered or amended at any regular meeting of the society.

== The first meetings ==
=== October 14, 1851 ===
==== Morning session ====
The meeting started off by elected a president, vice president, and secretary. Hannah Hiatt was the first president, Amanda Way was the first vice president, and Henry Hiatt was the first secretary. Hannah Hiatt requested that the new vice president make the opening address of the meeting. During that speech, Amanda M. Way stated that the "object of the meeting, and declaring that unless women demand their rights politically, socially and financially, they will continue in the future as in the past, to be classed with negroes, criminals, insane person, idiots, and infants." Henry B. Wright, who was a great antislavery lecturer, was called for and made a radical, striving speech, after which the convention closed until the next day.

==== Evening session ====
Hannah Hiatt called the convention to order. After preliminary business was discussed, Hiatt introduced H. C. Wright. Wright showed the injustice in property laws, inequality of wages, and the insulting cruelty of shutting the doors of the high school and colleges against women.

=== October 15, 1851 ===
==== Morning session ====
Amanda Way started the meeting by reading a letter from Dr. Mary F. Thomas of North Manchester and Elizabeth Matchett of Goshen. They read all of the resolutions for the amendments and after some discussion, there were all adopted. The members of the convention took the position that all class legislation is unjust and that all who are governed by laws should help make those laws. H. C. Wright gave another speech.

==== Afternoon session ====
There were speeches given by Joel P. Garris, M. R. Hiatt, H. C. Wright, Henry Hiatt, and others. The members of the association decided to hold another convention in a year. They selected Richmond as the place.

== Associated people ==
=== People who held positions ===
==== President ====
Notable women who were President

- Hannah Hiatt (the first President)
- L. W. Vandeburg (Lydia)
- Dr. Amelia R. Keller
- Anna D. Noland
- Helen M. Gougar

==== Vice president ====
Notable women who were vice president of IWSA

- Amanda Way
- Jane Marrow

==== Secretary ====
Notable people who were Secretary of IWSA

- Henry Hiatt
- Mary B. Birdsall

=== Influential people ===
==== These people signed the Constitution, or made speeches at the meetings ====
- H. C. Wright (Henry Clark)
  - Wright made many influential speeches during the first few meetings. He made a "thrilling speech based upon the Declaration of Independence that all men are created equal.' He showed how men had made the laws so that women were little better than slaves, the husband not only owning all the property but the children and the wife too."
- Joel P. Harris
- G. A. Way
- Lydia Davis
- M. J. Diggs (Melissa)
- Fanny Hiatt
- Agnes Cook
