= Mary F. Thomas =

American physician, abolitionist, & temperance and women's rights leader (1816–1888)

Mary Frame Thomas
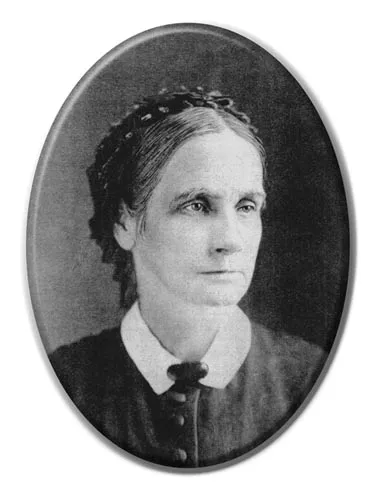
- Photograph of Dr. Mary F. Thomas, unknown date
- Born: Mary Frame Meyers; October 28, 1816; Montgomery County, Maryland, US
- Died: August 19, 1888 (aged 71); Richmond, Indiana, US
- Education: Penn's Medical College for Women (1851-1852; graduated 1854), Western Reserve Medical College (1852-1853)
- Occupation: Physician
- Known for: Woman's rights advocate, physician
- Spouse: Dr. Owen Thomas (m. July 1839)
- Children: 3
- Relatives: Hannah Longshore (sister)

Mary Frame Thomas (née Myers; 1816–1888) was a pioneer American woman medical doctor, abolitionist, and temperance and women's rights leader who advocated for women, as well as those in need. Born into a Quaker family, she grew up in Ohio and spent most of her life in Indiana. Thomas was an active member of the women's suffrage movement and a founding member of the Woman's Rights Association of Indiana (established in 1852 and renamed the Indiana Woman's Suffrage Association in 1869), serving as a vice president and president of the Indiana organization.

In 1859, she became the first woman to present a petition before the Indiana General Assembly, calling for passage of laws to provide property rights for married women and a women's suffrage amendment to the Indiana Constitution. At the national level she served a one-year term as president of the American Woman Suffrage Association. In the mid-1850s, she was a coeditor of Mary Birdsall's national woman's rights magazine, The Lily, and later an associate editor of the Mayflower with Lizzie Bunnel and a contributor to Woman's Journal.

== Early life ==
Mary Frame Meyers was born on October 28, 1816, in Montgomery County, Maryland, to Samuel and Mary Meyers, both of whom were Quakers. Her father, a farmer and an abolitionist, was an associate of Benjamin Lundy and helped organize the first anti-slavery society in Washington, D.C. While the family was living in the nation's capital, Mary's father took her to observe congressional debates. Quakers in the 19th century in Indiana and around the country were active in criminal justice reform and social justice movements, including temperance, abolition, and women's suffrage. Other notable white abolitionists and suffragists who had Quaker backgrounds were Sarah and Angelina Grimké, Rhoda M. Coffin, and Mary B. Birdsall.

Because the Meyers family believed slavery to be morally wrong, they moved to rural Ohio in 1833 when Mary was a teen to escape the pro-slavery atmosphere in Washington, D. C. The Meyers siblings, which include Mary, her two sisters and one brother, helped their parents work the Ohio farm. Samuel Meyers tutored his children in the evenings.

== Marriage and family ==
While living in Ohio, Meyers met Owen Thomas, a Quaker who also became a physician. They married in 1839 and moved to Wabash County, Indiana, where the couple began studying medicine together.

Mary and Owen Thomas had three daughters. Their oldest daughter died young; their middle daughter, Paulina (Thomas) Heald, later lived at Hartford, Michigan; their youngest daughter, Julia (Thomas) Irvine, graduated from Cornell University and became a teacher in New York.

Owen Thomas was supportive of his wife's ambitions to become a doctor, seen through his appointing her as his assistant physician, as well as her work as a suffragist. In the 1851 draft of the Indiana Woman's Suffrage Association's constitution, he signed the document directly after his wife.

== Pioneer woman physician ==
While residing in Wabash County, Indiana, Thomas began attending lectures with her husband on medicine. At the time when Thomas made the decision to become a physician, it was rare for women to pursue a career in medicine. In addition to practicing medicine and advocating for women's rights, Thomas decided to take formal medical courses beginning in 1851 at the Woman’s Medical College of Pennsylvania (Penn's Medical College for Women) in Philadelphia. She planned for her departure several months in advance, which included preparing her home and sewing clothing for Paulina, her only child at that time. Thomas studied at Penn's Medical College for Women in 1851 and 1852; took additional courses at Western Reserve Medical College in Cleveland, Ohio, from 1852 to 1853; and returned to graduate from Penn's Medical College in 1854. She was one of the first women to earn a medical degree in the country. In Penn's Medical College for Women catalog of 1860, Thomas is listed as having graduated in 1854 as a "lady graduate" and "ovarian dropsy" listed as her specialty. After completing her medical training, Thomas returned to Indiana to practice medicine in Fort Wayne. In 1856 she and her family moved to Richmond, Indiana, which was her home for the remainder of her life.

== Women's rights activist ==
In 1845, when Thomas attended a Quaker yearly meeting in Salem, Ohio, she heard Lucretia Mott deliver an address on women's rights. Several sources indicate that this speech inspired Thomas to become an advocate for women. After hearing Mott speak, Thomas became active in the suffrage movement, and in 1852 joined the Woman's Rights Association of Indiana (renamed the Indiana Woman's Suffrage Association in 1869.) The association's constitution proclaims as the basis for women's equality "a undeniable and self-evident truth" that God created "every one of his creatures 'free and inalienable rights.'" Resolutions incorporated within the initial constitution also point out that discriminatory laws against women should be eradicated, woman's rights were also universal rights, equal opportunities were for everyone, and that men should help the movement but not lead it since this was a woman's movement. Thomas and her husband were among the thirty-two original signers of the assoction's constitution October 13, 1852. Other notable signers include Amanda Way, Mary B. Birdsall, Fanny and Henry Hiatt, and Agnes Cook.

During the Indiana Woman's Rights Association's fourth annual meeting in 1855, Thomas was elected as one of the vice presidents of the organization for the following year. At the fifth annual meeting in October 1856, when she served as vice president to Amanda M. Way with fellow vice presidents that included Melissa J. Diggs, Fanny Hiatt, Hannah J. Small, and M. Collins Gordon, Thomas was elected as the president of the association for the next year's meeting. In 1857, Thomas presided over the association's meeting as president. Sarah Underhill, Emily Neff, Emma B. Swank, Elizabeth Wright, and Mary Birdsall served as her vice presidents. In her opening remarks Thomas stated "that while we [women] were still deprived of many rights and privileges, we had accomplished a great work for we now occupied a position much in advance of what we did a few years ago". She also explained, "By my example, as well as my words, I have tried to teach women to be more self-reliant, and to prepare themselves for larger and more varied spheres of activity” and continued to do so for the remainder of her life.

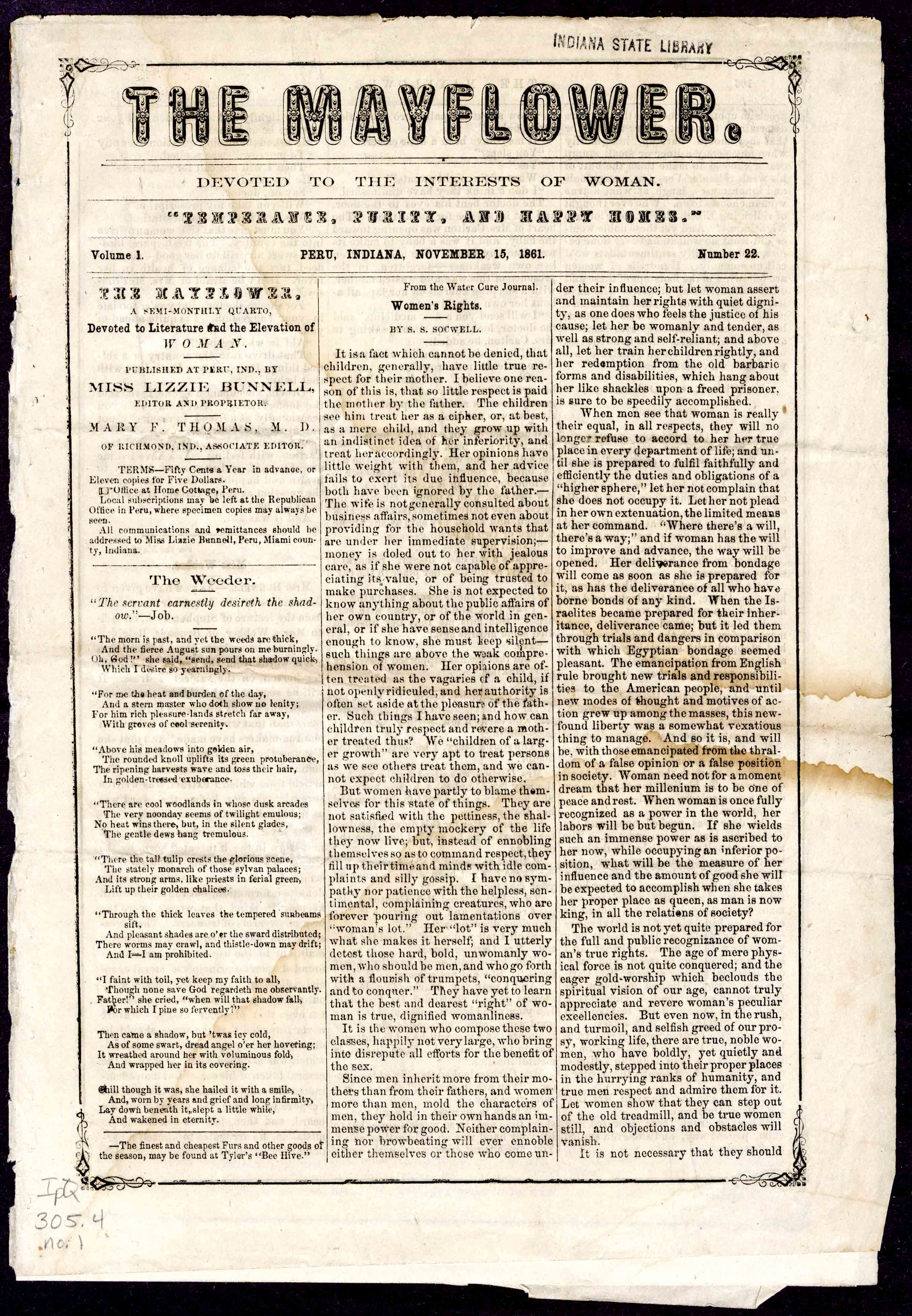
November 15, 1861 issue of The Mayflower, "devoted to the interests of women." It was published in Peru, Indiana, by Lizzie Bunnell and Mary F. Thomas.

Beginning in March 1857, Thomas became a coeditor of a national woman's magazine called The Lily, temporarily filling in for her fellow suffragist and Indiana Woman's Rights Association vice president Mary Birdsall, who had purchased the magazine from Amelia Bloomer in 1854 and was publishing it in Richmond, Indiana. The magazine focused on issues ranging from temperance and women's rights to dress reform and femme coverture. In 1858 and 1859 Thomas was associate editor of the Mayflower with Lizzie Bunnell. Thomas also contributed articles to Woman's Journal, among other newspapers.

=== First address to the Indiana state legislature ===
On January 19, 1859, Thomas, Mary Birdsall, and Agnes Cook addressed a special joint session of the Indiana General Assembly when it met to hear a petition for women's rights. Thomas became the first woman to present a petition before the state legislature. The Indiana Women's Rights Association’s petition, which included more than one thousand signatures, called for passage of laws to provide property rights for married women and a women's suffrage amendment to the Indiana Constitution. Thomas presented the petition using logical arguments and strongly advocated for equal rights after pleading with the assembly to listen respectfully. Birdsall spoke after Thomas and called for women's suffrage; Cook concluded the remarks with an appeal for temperance. Despite their efforts, the state legislature to no action on the petition.

Various contemporary accounts of the event reported different descriptions of the atmosphere in the statehouse as the women spoke. Some reports described the men in the crowd as "rough, outspoken and boisterous"; other accounts indicated that everyone listened "politely."

== American Civil War service ==
During the American Civil War, women's public roles were expanded out of necessity as men joined the military. Some women organized events to raise funds to aid soldiers' families, ran family businesses and farms, or volunteered as nurses to help care for wounded soldiers. Thomas was active in these efforts. In March 1862, Indiana Governor Oliver P. Morton established the Indiana Sanitary Commission to help raise funds and gather supplies for troops in the field. Thomas initially worked in Richmond, Indiana, for a year gathering supplies for the war effort. Beginning in January 1863, Governor Morton and the Indiana Sanitary Commission enlisted the aid of women, including Thomas, to help carry supplies to the front line and to serve as nurses.

During the summer of 1863, just after the Battle of Vicksburg, Thomas was among the volunteers who brought supplies to Indiana soldiers serving at Vicksburg, Mississippi. She returned north aboard a steamboat with 200 sick and wounded soldiers including 47 of them who were under her direct care. In addition to her service at Vicksburg, Thomas nursed wounded soldiers at hospitals in Washington, D.C.; Nashville, Tennessee; and Natchez, Mississippi. In 1864, Thomas was appointed superintendent and served for eight months at a hospital for war refugees and freed slaves in Nashville as assistant physician with her husband, who was the hospital's surgeon. Two of the Thomases daughters, Paulina and Julia, served as teachers for the refugees. After the Civil War, Thomas and her husband returned to Richmond, Indiana, where they continued their social activism.

== Later life ==
Thomas continued to dedicating her life to medicine in her later years and remained an advocate for women's rights. In addition to her service as president of the Indiana Women's Suffrage Association and a one-year term as president of the American Woman Suffrage Association, she made other appearances before joint sessions of the Indiana General Assembly. On January 3, 1877, Thomas and women's rights activist Zerelda Wallace, the wife for former Indiana governor David Wallace, addressed the state legislature in support of a women's suffrage resolution, but the measure was defeated by a vote of 51 to 22. Thomas and other women's suffrage supporters also spoke before a joint session of the state legislature on February 24, 1879, but the state legislature took no action on the issue.

Thomas served the city physician of Richmond, Indiana, and on its Board of Public Health. In addition, she was one of the founders of Richmond's Home for Friendless Women. The Richmond facility had a similar mission to the Indianapolis Home for Friendless Women, which was established in the 1860s "for the aid and improvement of abandoned women." Thomas served as a physician at the Richmond home from 1875 until her death in 1888.

In 1875, about twenty years after Thomas had moved to Richmond, she was elected to the Wayne County Medical Society. (Earlier, while practicing medicine in Fort Wayne, Indiana, the Allen County Medical Society twice rejected Thomas's election into its membership, which some sources conclude was most likely due to her sex). In 1876 Thomas became the first female member of the Indiana State Medical Society. In 1877 she was the first woman to represent the state organization as a delegate to the American Medical Association. Thomas also became the AMA's second female member. Between 1880 and 1887 several of her essays on medical topics were published in the Transactions of the State Medical Society.

== Death and legacy ==
Thomas died in Richmond, Indiana, on August 19, 1888. In her final wishes she requested that her six pall bearers be women: four white women to represent the Good Templars, the Woman's Christian Temperance Union, the Indiana Woman's Suffrage Association, and the Richmond, Indiana, Home for Friendless Women, and two African-American women to represent all races and the struggle for rights for all.

Thomas is remembered as a pioneer woman physician, for her work as a temperance advocate and an abolitionist, her leadership in the women's suffrage movement, and her service to the Indiana Women's Suffrage Association. As a “champion of the oppressed”, especially women and children in need, she was "alert to all injustice suffered by women under the law, and energetic in her efforts to secure a remedy. Though not a lobbyist in any sense of the term, her influence and work aided materially in bringing about better legislation in Indiana for women and children." According to an obituary published in 1889 in the Friends' Intelligencer and Journal, "she was always deeply interested in the care of the helpless and needy, -- a veritable Dorcas, and beloved physician indeed to the poor." An Indiana State Historical Marker commemorating Dr. Mary F. Thomas was dedicated in Richmond, Indiana, in 2023.
