= Helen M. Gougar =

American lawyer (1843–1907)

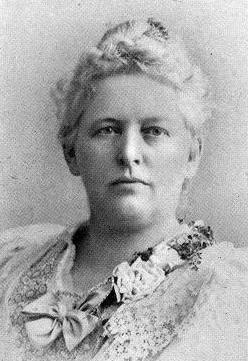
- Gougar in 1902
- Born: Helen Mar Jackson; July 18, 1843; Hillsdale County, Michigan
- Died: June 6, 1907 (aged 63); Lafayette, Indiana
- Education: Hillsdale College
- Occupations: Lawyer, activist, newspaper journalist
- Known for: Advocacy of temperance and women's suffrage
- Spouse: John Gougar

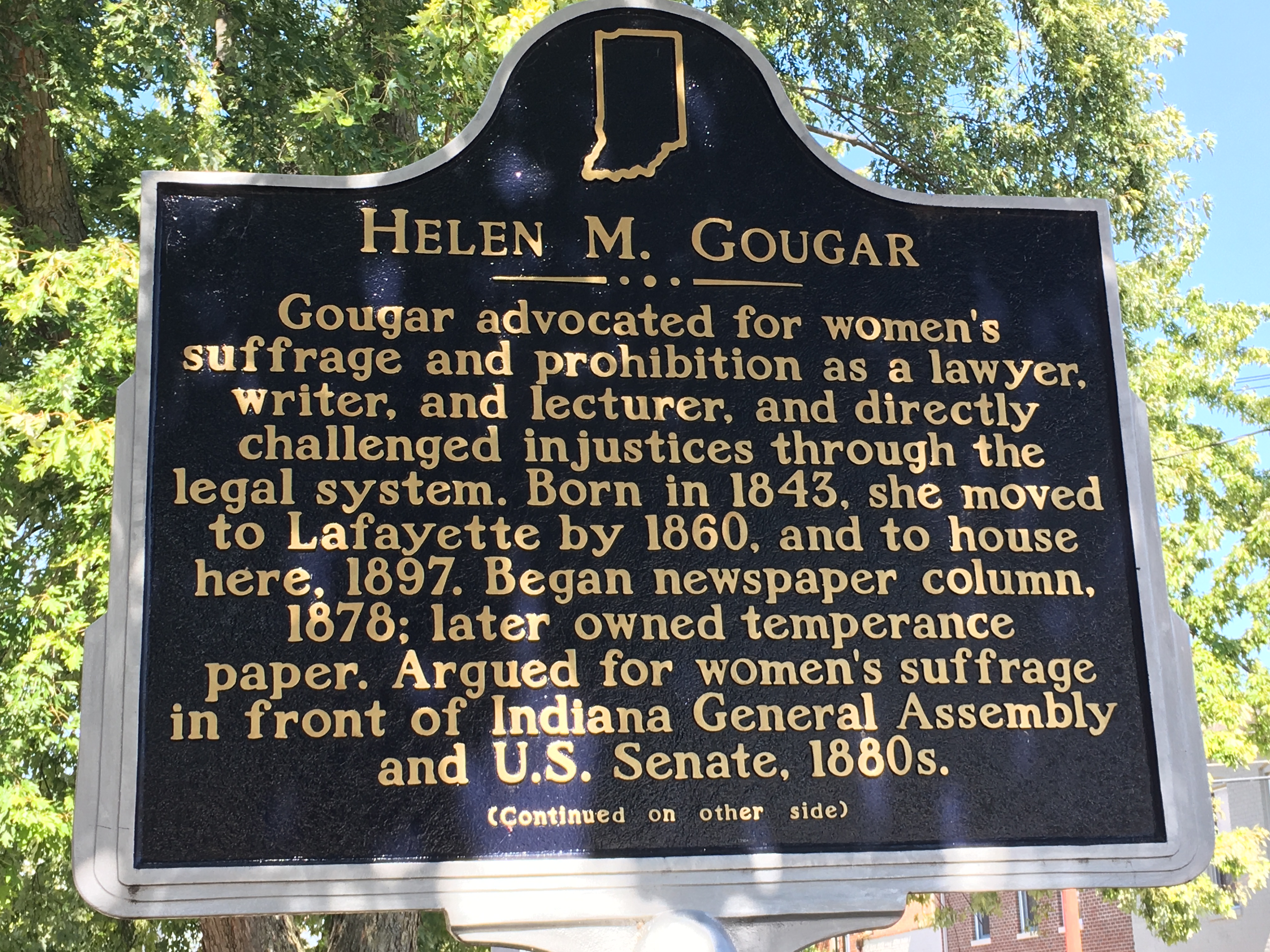

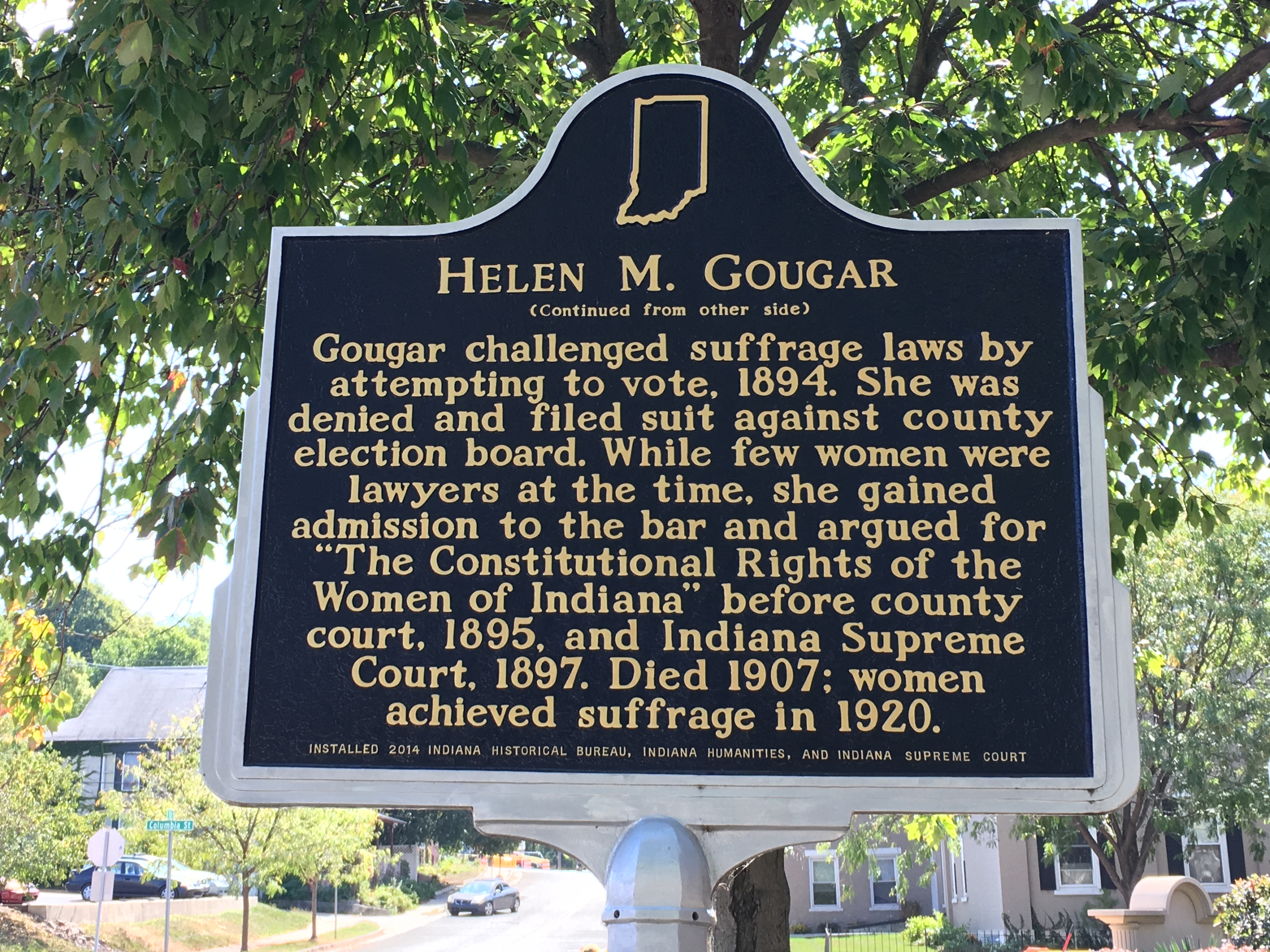

Helen M. Gougar (July 18, 1843 – June 6, 1907) was a lawyer, temperance and women's rights advocate, and newspaper journalist who resided in Lafayette, Indiana. Admitted to the Tippecanoe County, Indiana, bar in 1895 to present a "test" case, she was among the first women lawyers in the county. In 1897 she became one of the first women to argue a case before the Indiana Supreme Court. Gougar attracted attention for arguing a case for her right to vote in the 1894 elections. In addition to her advocacy work, Gougar became a public speaker and frequently campaigned to elect politicians who shared her views on women's suffrage and prohibition. She was the President for the Indiana Woman's Suffrage Association. An Indiana historical marker, dedicated in 2014, honors her efforts to secure voting rights for women.

== Early life and education ==
Helen Mar Jackson was born on July 18, 1843, in Hillsdale County, Michigan. She was raised in Litchfield, Michigan, and educated at Hillsdale College. In 1860, she moved to Lafayette, Indiana, with her brothers and three uncles. She worked as a teacher in Lafayette's public school system and became a school principal in 1863.

== Marriage and family ==
In 1863 Helen married John Gougar, a Lafayette attorney, and became his legal apprentice. The couple had no children.

== Career ==
Gougar's career included work as a newspaper journalist, lawyer, and a temperance and women's suffrage advocate. In addition, she and her husband were active in Lafayette's civic and social affairs. She served on the committees of several local organizations, including the Young Men's Christian Association, Lafayette Home Association, Ladies Benevolent Society, and the Second Presbyterian Church, but her temperance and women's suffrage activities gained public attention in the late nineteenth and early twentieth centuries.

=== Newspaper journalist ===
In the 1870s and 1880s Gougar worked as a newspaper journalist. She wrote a weekly column called "Bric-a-Brac" for the Lafayette Courier that produced a series of essays expressing her own views and included the text of her speeches as well as the opinions of others on temperance and women's suffrage. Her unapologetic writing style became her trademark. In 1881 Gougar began editing Our Herald, a weekly newspaper that supported temperance and suffrage issues, and became its owner.

=== Lawyer and women's suffrage advocate ===
Gougar began her public life as a temperance advocate. She claimed to have joined the women's suffrage movement after concluding that attaining voting rights for women would be an effective way to resolve issues for victims of domestic violence.

Following her attendance at the annual convention of the National American Women Suffrage Association in 1881, Gougar returned to Indiana and began lobbying for passage of legislation allowing women to vote. She appeared before members of the Indiana General Assembly in February 1881 to urge them to support a bill allowing women to vote in national elections, but it failed to pass. A subsequent amendment to the Indiana constitution passed in the Indiana House of Representatives and the Indiana Senate in 1881, but it failed to pass during the 1883 legislative session, a requirement before it could become a state law.

Gougar also campaigned for state and national political candidates to elect politicians who supported passage of women's suffrage and temperance legislation. In the 1882 Indiana elections she campaigned for Republicans who supported women's suffrage, but most of them were defeated by Democratic opponents. Gougar had more success in securing municipal voting rights for women elsewhere. In 1884 she traveled to Kansas to lead an effort to draft a municipal suffrage bill. Introduced in the Kansas legislature in 1885, it became a state law in 1887.

Frequently criticized for her strong views on women's suffrage, temperance, and prohibition, Gougar sought legal action to protect her reputation on more than one occasion. In 1882, after Gougar discovered that she had been implicated in a rumor of "sexual infidelity" with W. DeWitt Wallace, a Republican candidate for state representative, she filed a lawsuit against Lafayette Sheriff Henry Mandler, who acknowledged he circulated the rumors, and charged him with slander. In Gougar v. Mandler (1883) the jury found in favor of Gougar and awarded her $5,000 in damages. The victory encouraged her to continue the fight for temperance and women's rights. In 1893 Gougar sued Massachusetts congressman Elijah A. Morse for libel.

Gougar tested the state's voting laws when she attempted to vote in Tippecanoe County, Indiana, in the November 1894 elections. After the county elections board refused to allow her to vote, she sued the board. Gougar, who became one of the first women lawyers in Tippecanoe County, made her first appearance as an attorney in the Tippecanoe County Superior Court in January 1895 on the same day she was admitted to the Tippecanoe County bar, to argue a "test" case. The judge ruled in favor of the election board, but Gougar appealed the case to the Indiana Supreme Court.

On February 10, 1897, Gougar became one of the first women to argue a case before the Indiana Supreme Court. In Gougar v Timberlake (1897), she argued that voting was a natural right of men and women and that the Fourteenth Amendment to the United States Constitution assured her the right regardless of the text in Indiana's constitution, which limited the franchise to males aged twenty-one and older. The Court, which considered voting a political right, denied the appeal, but Gougar's legal arguments were published in Indiana's newspapers, providing statewide exposure of her views on the subject.

== Later years ==
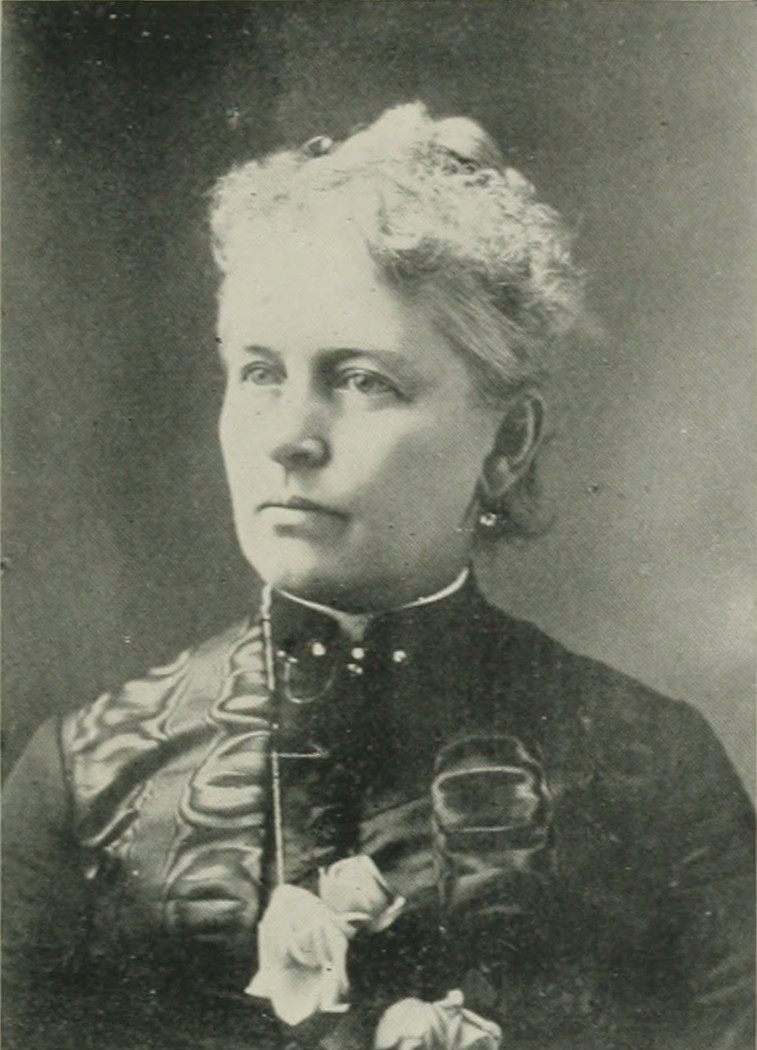
"A Woman of the Century"

Gougar remained active in politics in later life. The Prohibition Party nominated her for Indiana attorney general in 1896 and she campaigned for politicians who shared her views, including William Jennings Bryan. She was a frequent public speaker and traveled extensively with her husband.

== Death and legacy ==
Gougar died unexpectedly at her home in Lafayette on June 6, 1907. Her death occurred more than a decade before women achieved voting rights under the Nineteenth Amendment to the U.S. Constitution.

A state historical marker in Tippecanoe County, Indiana, was dedicated in November 2014 to honor Gougar's efforts to secure voting rights for women.
