= Joseph Swain (academic) =

American academic and ichthyologist

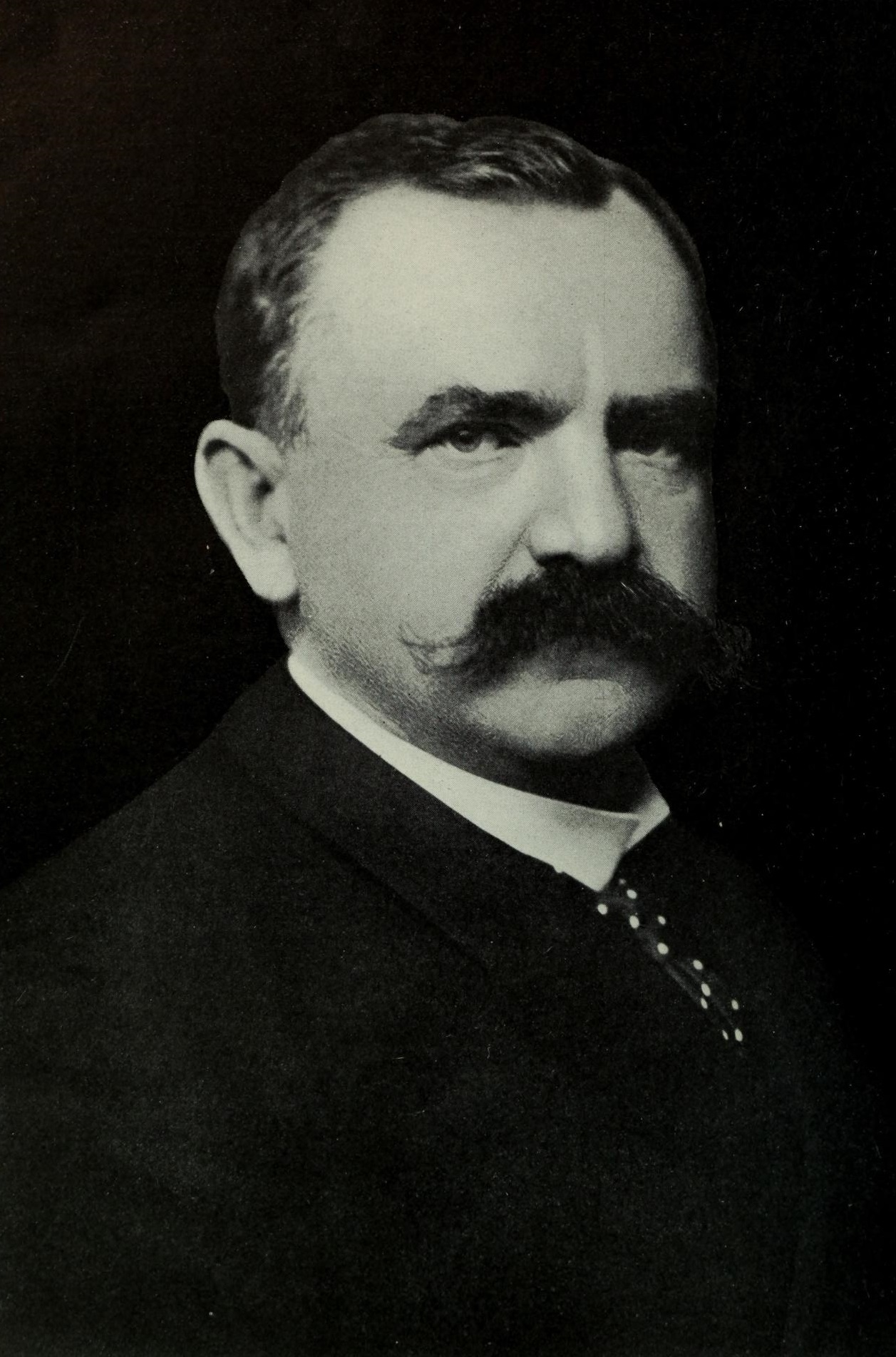
- Joseph Swain

6th President of Swarthmore College
- In office 1902–1921
- Preceded by: William Birdsall
- Succeeded by: Frank Aydelotte

9th President of Indiana University
- In office 1893–1902
- Preceded by: John M. Coulter
- Succeeded by: William Lowe Bryan

Personal details
- Born: June 16, 1857 Pendleton, Indiana, U.S.
- Died: May 19, 1927 (aged 69) Clifton Heights, Pennsylvania
- Resting place: Friends Cemetery, Pendleton, Indiana, U.S.
- Education: Indiana University Bloomington B.A., M.A.
- Profession: educator, administrator

Academic background
- Education: Indiana University Bloomington
- Academic advisor: David Starr Jordan

Academic work
- Discipline: Mathematics
- Institutions: Indiana University; Stanford University; Swarthmore College

Joseph Swain (June 16, 1857 – May 19, 1927) served as the ninth president of Indiana University and also as the sixth president of Swarthmore College.

== Summary ==
=== Education ===
- Indiana University Bloomington (B.L. 1883, M.S. 1885)
- Wabash College (LL.D. 1893)

=== Career ===
- Professor of mathematics and biology at Indiana University Bloomington (1883–1891)
- Professor of mathematics at Stanford University (1891–1893)
- President of Indiana University (1893–1902)
- President of Swarthmore College (1902–1921)

== Biography ==
Joseph Swain was Indiana University's first Indiana-born president. He was born in Pendleton, Indiana, to Woolston and Mary A. Swain. Swain attended IU as an undergraduate and graduate student. He matriculated in 1879 and graduated with a B.L. degree in 1883. From 1883 to 1885, he was an instructor of mathematics and biology at Indiana University while he completed his graduate education and graduated with a M.S. degree in 1885. Starting in 1885, Swain was an associate professor of mathematics until 1886, where he then was professor for five years until 1891. He left his professorship at IU in 1891 to follow departing IU president David Starr Jordan to Stanford University, where he taught as a professor of mathematics. In 1893, Swain received an honorary LL.D. degree from Wabash College. Swain returned to IU in 1893 to serve as IU's ninth president, succeeding John Coulter. He met Frances M. Morgan, of Knightstown, Indiana, while teaching at IU and they went on to marry on September 22, 1885. Swain accepted the invitation to serve as President for Swarthmore College in 1902 until 1921. He retired from Swarthmore in 1921 as President Emeritus and died six years later from heart disease in Clifton Heights, Pennsylvania, on May 19, 1927. He is buried in his hometown of Pendleton in Friends Cemetery.

== Indiana University administration ==
Swain served as IU's president from 1893 to 1902. During that time, he established Kirkwood Hall in 1894; a gymnasium for men in 1896, which later was named Assembly Hall; Kirkwood Observatory in 1900; and he began construction for Science Hall in 1901. During his presidency, student enrollment increased from 524 to 1,285.

== Associations ==
Swain was the ex-president of the Indiana State Teachers Association, member of the Section on Higher Education of the National Council on Education, member of the World Peace Foundation and served as president of the N.E.A. from 1913 to 1914.

== Tributes ==
In 1940, Indiana University opened a new physical science building which they called Swain Hall (now known as Swain Hall West). In 1960, The building was expanded by the incorporation of the former Biology Hall, which became Swain Hall East. The entire complex is known as Swain Hall.

In 2016, Indiana University renamed the Student Building to the Frances Morgan Swain Student Building to honor his wife Frances for her work in trying to increase women enrollments and make it easier for women to acquire a college education during the 1890s.

== See also ==
- Category:Taxa named by Joseph Swain (academic)
