= William Birdsall =

William Wilfred Birdsall
- Born: 1854; Richmond, Indiana
- Died: March 17, 1909 (aged 54–55)
- Education: Earlham College
- Title: President of Swarthmore College
- Term: 1898-1902
- Predecessor: Charles De Garmo
- Successor: Joseph Swain
- Spouse: Viola Isabel McDill
- Parents: Thomas Birdsall (father); Mary Birdsall (mother)

William Wilfred Birdsall (1854–1909) was a Quaker educator who was president of Swarthmore College from 1898 to 1902.

Birdsall was born in Indiana in 1854, the son of Mary and Thomas Birdsall. His mother, Mary Birdsall, was a premiere suffragist, woman’s rights advocate, and editor in Indiana. She was one of the first women to address the Indiana State Legislature, demanding equal rights to men. Birdsall received a BS from Earlham College in 1873 and then went on to teach at Richmond High School in Indiana. Birdsall became the president of the Boys High School in Wilmington, Delaware. In 1880 at age 26 Birdsall married Viola Isabel McDill. In 1885 he became a teacher at Friends’ Central School in Philadelphia, and soon after was promoted to president of the school.

In 1898 he was selected to be the President of Swarthmore College. Birdsall’s selection was an attempt by the Board of Managers to emphasize the Quaker qualities of the college. His predecessor, Charles De Garmo, who served from 1891 to 1898 had focused more on rigorous academic goals. Between the years 1900 and 1901 Birdsall’s administration made a number of changes including a complete readjustment of the teaching staff, installation of a new heating system, building a new gym for the male students, and the introduction of a pre-medical course all between 1900 and 1901. His goal was to increase the number of Swarthmore students by offering an increased number of scholarships.

Birdsall succeeded in attracting more attention to the college from the Quaker community, but had critics among alumni, faculty, and students who thought that more attention should be placed on the quality of the school not its denominational affiliation. His critics were also concerned that his experience did not prepare him for a college presidency. The Board decided to change the focus of the college and to seek a president with stronger academic credentials. His successor was Joseph Swain who had been the president of Indiana University; he agreed only to come if he was given more authority as president of the college. After serving as president for only four years Birdsall resigned from his position in 1902 and became the principal of Girls’ High School of Philadelphia. He remained in this position until his death on March 17, 1909.
