= Bloomers =

Type of women's garment

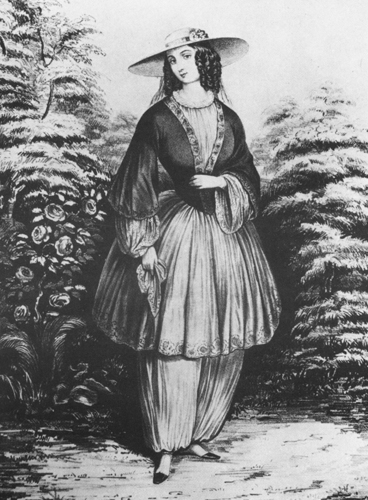
- 1850s' fashion bloomers
- Type: Underwear

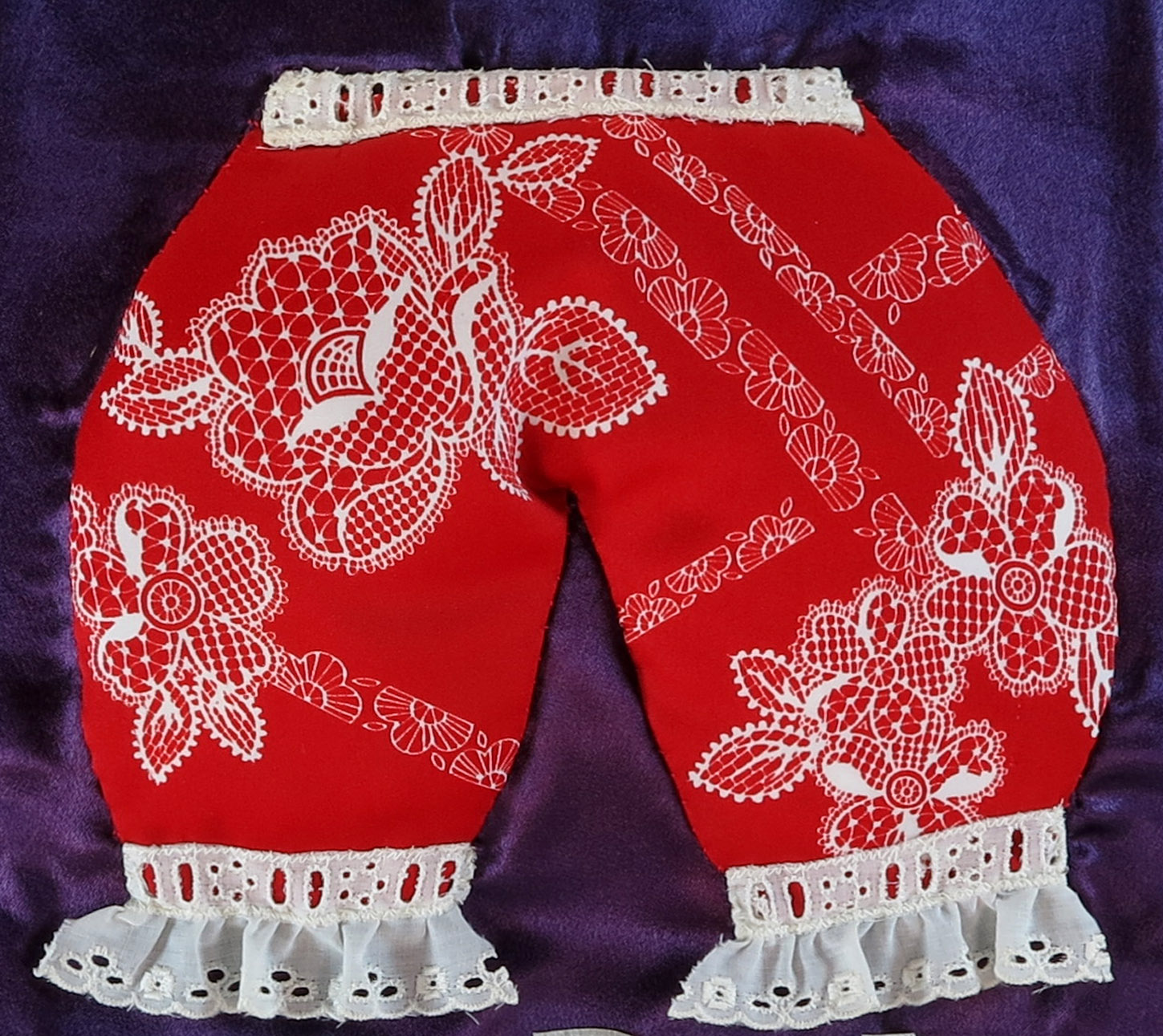
A pair of bloomers, 1981

Bloomers, also called the bloomer, the Turkish dress, the American dress, or simply reform dress, are divided women's garments for the lower body. They were developed in the 19th century They take their name from their best-known advocate, the women's rights activist Amelia Bloomer.

The name "bloomers" was derogatory and was not used by the women who wore them, who referred to their clothes as the "reform costume" or the "American dress."

== Fashion bloomers (skirted) ==
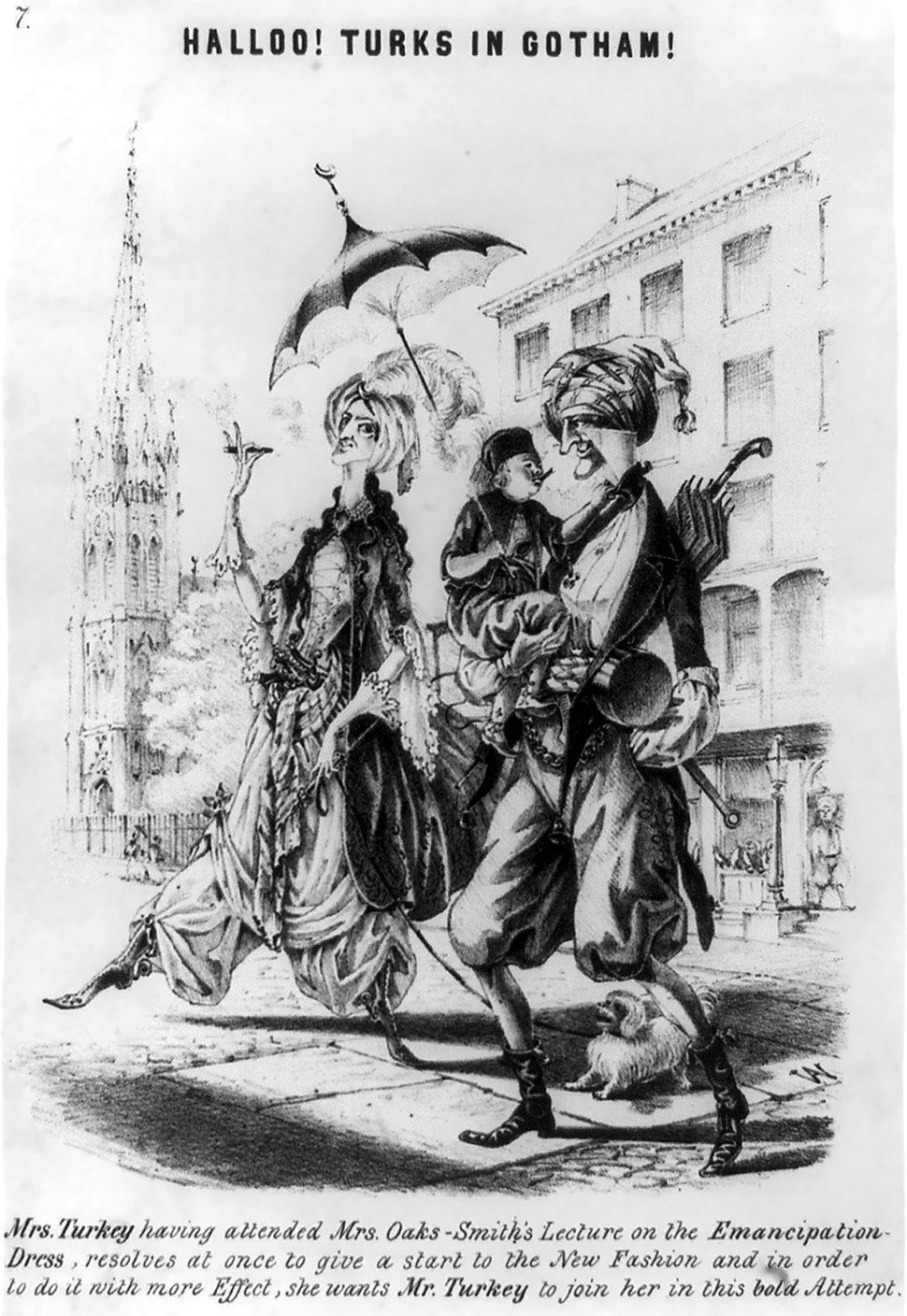
1851 caricature of fashion bloomers

Bloomers were an innovation of readers of the Water-Cure Journal, a popular health periodical that in October 1849 began urging women to develop a style of dress that was not so harmful to their health as the existing fashion. It also represented an unrestricted movement, unlike previous women's fashions of the time, that allowed for greater freedom—both metaphorical and physical—within the public sphere. The fashionable dress of that time consisted of a skirt that dragged several inches on the floor, worn over layers of starched petticoats stiffened with straw or horsehair sewn into the hems. In addition to the heavy skirts, prevailing fashion called for a "long waist" effect, achieved with a whale-bone-fitted corset.

Women responded with a variety of costumes, many inspired by the pantaloons of Turkey, and all including some form of pants. By the summer of 1850, various versions of a short skirt and trousers, or "Turkish dress", were being worn by readers of the Water-Cure Journal as well as women patients at the nation's health resorts. After wearing the style in private, some began wearing it in public. In the winter and spring of 1851, newspapers across the country carried startled sightings of the dresses.

The wearing of bloomers—a woman wearing pants, a men's garment—was a question of power. The symbolism of bloomers was enormous. Men felt threatened by them, and sometimes disparaged women wearing them as "Amazons" or "male impersonators".

=== Bloomer craze of 1851 ===
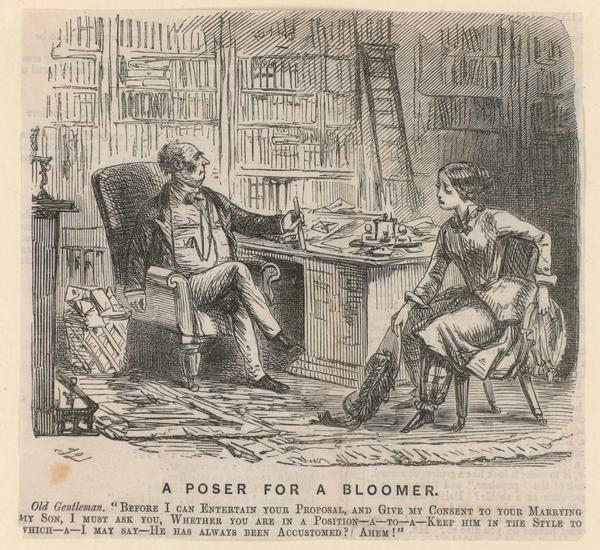
In a reversal of gender roles, a "bloomer" asks her fiancé's shocked father for consent to marry his son: satirical cartoon from 1852.

In February 1851, Elizabeth Smith Miller of Peterboro, New York, wore the "Turkish dress" to the Seneca Falls, New York, home of Amelia Bloomer and her temperance journal, The Lily. The next month, Bloomer announced to her readers that she had adopted the dress and, in response to many inquiries, printed a description of her dress and instructions on how to make it. Her circulation rose from 500 to 3,000. By June, many newspapers had dubbed it the "Bloomer dress".

During the summer of 1851, the nation was seized by a "bloomer craze". Health reformer Mary Gove Nichols drafted a Declaration of Independence from the Despotism of Parisian Fashion and gathered signatures to it at lectures on woman's dress. Managers of the textile mills in Lowell, Massachusetts, gave a banquet for any of their female workers who adopted the safer dress before July 4. In Toledo, Ohio, 60 women turned out in Turkish costume at one of the city's grandest social events. Bloomer balls and bloomer picnics were held; dress reform societies and bloomer institutes were formed. A grand festival in favor of the costume was held at New York City's Broadway Tabernacle in September. In August, a woman who had spent six months sailing from Philadelphia around the Horn to California with the reform dress packed in her trunk disembarked to find that the dress had preceded her and was being displayed in the window of a San Francisco dress shop.

=== Bloomers in London ===
Interest in the bloomers was also sparked in England when Hannah Tracy Cutler and other women delegates wore the new dress to an International Peace Congress in London. Many newspaper reports were dedicated to the controversy the outfit caused. One prominent figure who began to lecture about the bloomers in London and beyond was Caroline Dexter. When she and her husband later emigrated to Australia, she continued to advocate for dress reform. Although few women are known to have worn the bloomers in Australia, Dexter's continued support led to controversy in The Sydney Morning Herald.

=== Women's rights ===
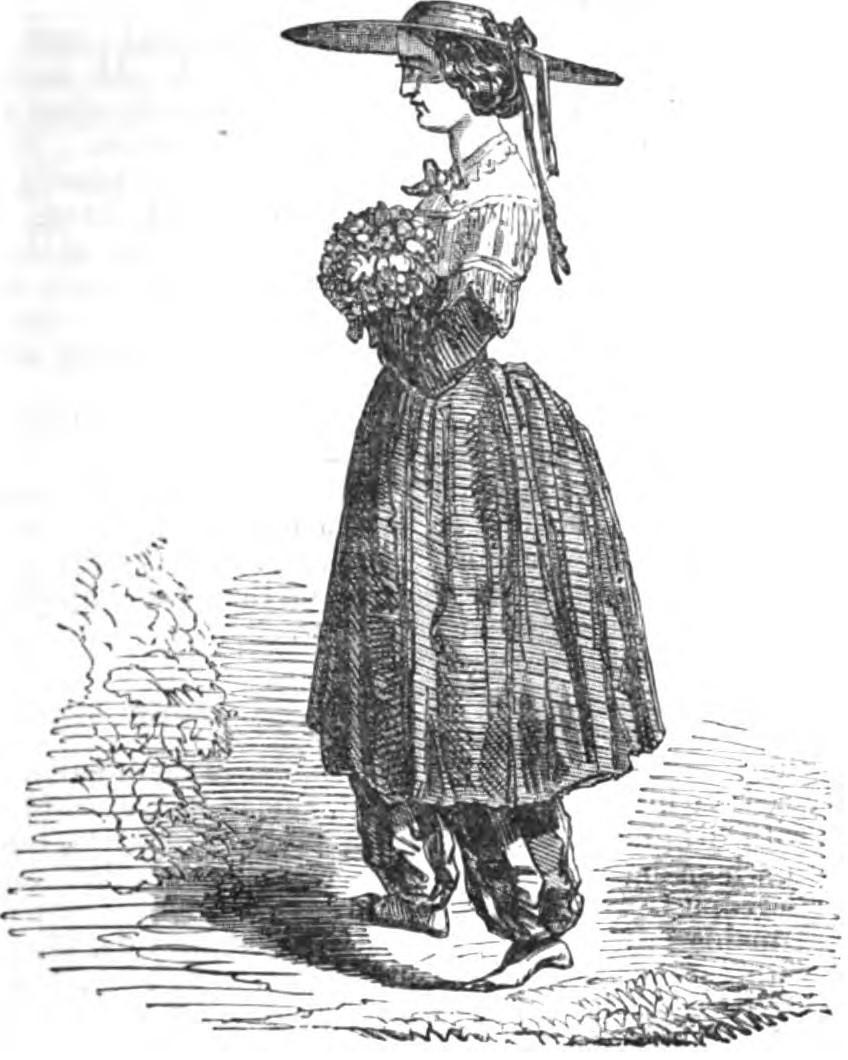
Bloomer costume (Robert Chambers, The Book of Days, 1864)

The Bloomer became a symbol of women's rights in the early 1850s. Women—Elizabeth Cady Stanton, Lucy Stone, and Susan B. Anthony—who adopted the new form of dress also advocated women's right to vote. These women preferred to call their new style the "freedom dress", a two-piece outfit similar to the shalwar kameez of Central and South Asia. Crowds gathered to not only hear these women's radical words, but also to see their "scandalous" mode of dress. After three years, however, fearing that the new dress was drawing attention away from the suffragist cause, many of these women returned to corsets, long skirts, and more conventional forms of dress. In similar suit, the Dress Reform Association which was formed in 1856 called the outfit the "American costume" and focused on its health benefits rather than its political symbolism. Following the American Civil War, interest in the Bloomer costume waned almost completely until its resurgence in the 1890s.

In the 1850s, the "bloomer" was a physical and metaphorical representation of feminist reform. This garment originated in late 1849 for the purpose of developing a style of dress for women that was less harmful to their health. Because it was less restricting than the previous attire, the bloomer provided more physical freedom for women. Being a completely new and distinctively different form of dress, the bloomer garment also provided women with a metaphorical freedom, in the sense that it gave women not only more diverse dress options, but also the opportunity and power to choose their type of garment.

Some individuals at the time even argued that the Bloomer dress should be adopted for moral reasons. A reporter noted that a group of "very intelligent appearing, lady-like women" met in Milford, Massachusetts in July 1852. The purpose of this meeting was to consider the propriety of adopting bloomers. The women unanimously passed a resolution approving the costume, declaring existing fashion to be consistent with "moral evils" and arguing that the bloomer would facilitate women's efforts to engage in good works."

And now I'm dressed like a little girl, in a dress both loose and short,
Oh with what freedom I can sing, and walk all 'round about!
And when I get a little strength, some work I think I can do,
'Twill give me health and comfort, and make me useful too.

— The Sibyl magazine, April 15, 1859

Feminists, such as Elizabeth Cady Stanton and many others, essentially claimed that women who took on the "feminist dress" look without being fully knowledgeable of all the accompanying issues were imposters. They were concerned that individuals could demonstrate reform without actually being an expert in the issues. In the Sibyl poem, the feeling and element of reform was demonstrated through simplicity and the subtle appreciation of this small step in women's fashion in parallel to a small step for women in general. During the 1850s, feminist reformers were fighting numerous battles to bring about change and further equality to women everywhere. Feminists believed that it was more important to focus on the issues, and that giving in to fashionable trends was exactly what they were battling against. However, the simple change in popular dress symbolically furthered women's liberation.

=== Opposition to Bloomer dress ===
Bloomer's promotion of the style as a freedom dress rather than as a health dress did nothing to recommend it to the orthodox clergy and other critics of the woman's rights movement, who denounced the wearing of pants by women as a usurpation of male authority. Associating it with the woman's rights movement, the New York Sunday Mercury published a picture representing the woman's rights convention held in Akron, Ohio, in May 1851. It depicted every woman in coat, breeches, and high boots, sitting cross-legged and smoking cigars, when in truth not a bloomer was present. Some young women were denied church membership for wearing the dress. Public meetings were called to put down the fad, and the same newspapers that had previously praised the dress began ridiculing and condemning "Bloomerism". In August 1851, Harper's Monthly reprinted a cartoon and article from a London newspaper ridiculing the American dress, one month after it had printed a sketch of the "Oriental costume" and pronounced it tasteful, elegant, and graceful.

=== Bloomers in the West ===
Lucy Stone, one of America's most famous orators in the woman's rights movement during the 1850s, helped popularize the dress by wearing it as she addressed immense audiences in over twenty states, the District of Columbia, and Ontario between 1851 and 1855. She had begun wearing the dress as a health measure while recuperating from typhoid fever during the winter of 1850–51, and she wore it exclusively for three years. In 1856 a National Dress Reform Association organized and one of its officers, Dr. Lydia Sayer Hasbrouck, who had worn the dress since 1849, established a journal, The Sibyl, as the society's organ. From July 1856 through June 1864, that paper carried news of dress reform to subscribers from New England to California and published the names of nearly a thousand women who sent in their names as wearers of the reform dress. A letter-writer from Iowa said it was especially suited for life on the prairie and reported that many women from various parts of the state wore it all the time. Readers from Illinois, Arkansas, Michigan, Wisconsin, Kansas, Nebraska, Dakota, and Oregon attested to its popularity among Western women. In 1860, an English traveler reported meeting a bloomer wearer in Laramie, Wyoming, and a traveler to Pike's Peak reported that "the bloomer costume is considerably in vogue and appears peculiarly adapted to overland travel".

=== Civil War nurses and the bloomer ===
When Dorothea Dix was appointed superintendent of army nurses in June 1861, she issued a statement banning the bloomer from army hospitals and requiring women to abandon it before entering nursing service. But as Western communities organized battalions of soldiers, they also formed corps of volunteer nurses to accompany them, and many of these nurses adopted the reform dress for field service. All members of one such corps, organized by Dr. Fedelia Harris Reid of Berlin, Wisconsin, and called the "Wisconsin Florence Nightengale Union", wore the bloomer not only in the field, but also while caring for patients at a military hospital in St. Louis. Four bloomer wearers were among the nurses who accompanied Minnesota's First Regiment. Dr. Mary E. Walker, who earned the Congressional Medal of Honor for her medical services during the Civil War, wore the reform dress while working in a military hospital in Washington, D.C., as well as for field work. As she accompanied troops in the South, she wrote to the Sibyl that New Orleans women of wealth and standing had worn it to Haiti and Cuba. The dress was still being worn by members of the utopian Oneida Community in 1867 but gradually it was abandoned by all but a very few stalwart wearers willing to defy society's mores.

=== Bloomers and bicycles ===
In 1893, the Woman's Congress of the World's Columbian Exposition revived interest in the bloomer as an aid in improving women's health through physical exercise. Their session on women's dress opened with Lucy Stone reminiscing about the bloomer movement of the 1850s; her extolling the bloomer as the "cleanest, neatest, most comfortable and most sensible garment" she had ever worn; and young women modeling different versions of the dress. The following year Annie "Londonderry" Cohen Kopchovsky donned the bloomer during her famous bicycle trip around the world, and an updated version of the bloomer soon became the standard "bicycle dress" for women during the bicycle craze of the 1890s.

In 1909, fashion designer Paul Poiret attempted to popularize harem pants worn below a long flaring tunic, but this attempted revival of fashion bloomers under another name did not catch on.

== Athletic bloomers (unskirted) ==
=== 19th and 20th centuries ===
During the late 19th century, athletic bloomers (also known as "rationals" or "knickerbockers") were skirtless baggy knee-length trousers, fastened to the leg a little below the knees; at that time, they were worn by women only in a few narrow contexts of athletic activity, such as bicycle-riding, gymnastics, and sports other than tennis (see 1890s in fashion). Bloomers were usually worn with stockings and after 1910 often with a sailor middy blouse.

Bloomers became shorter by the late 1920s. In the 1930s, when it became respectable for women to wear pants and shorts in a wider range of circumstances, styles imitating men's shorts were favored, and bloomers tended to become less common. However, baggy knee-length gym shorts fastened at or above the knees continued to be worn by girls in school physical education classes through to the 1950s in some areas. Some schools in New York City and Sydney still wore them as part of their uniforms into the 1980s. In Japan their use persisted into the early 2000s.

The Bloomington, Illinois, entry in the Three-I League of minor league baseball, despite being an all-male team, was tagged with the nickname "Bloomers" for several decades in the early 1900s.

=== Bloomers in Japan ===
Known as buruma (ブルマ), also burumā (ブルマー), bloomers were introduced in Japan as women's clothing for physical education in 1903. After the 1964 Summer Olympics in Tokyo, in response to the styles worn by the foreign women athletes, a newer style of bloomers, pittari, which fit the body closer, similar to volleyball uniforms, became commonplace. Around the mid-1990s, however, schools and individuals began to choose sports shorts instead, citing modesty concerns. Some people are interested in bloomers in clothing fetish context.

=== Gallery of athletic bloomers ===
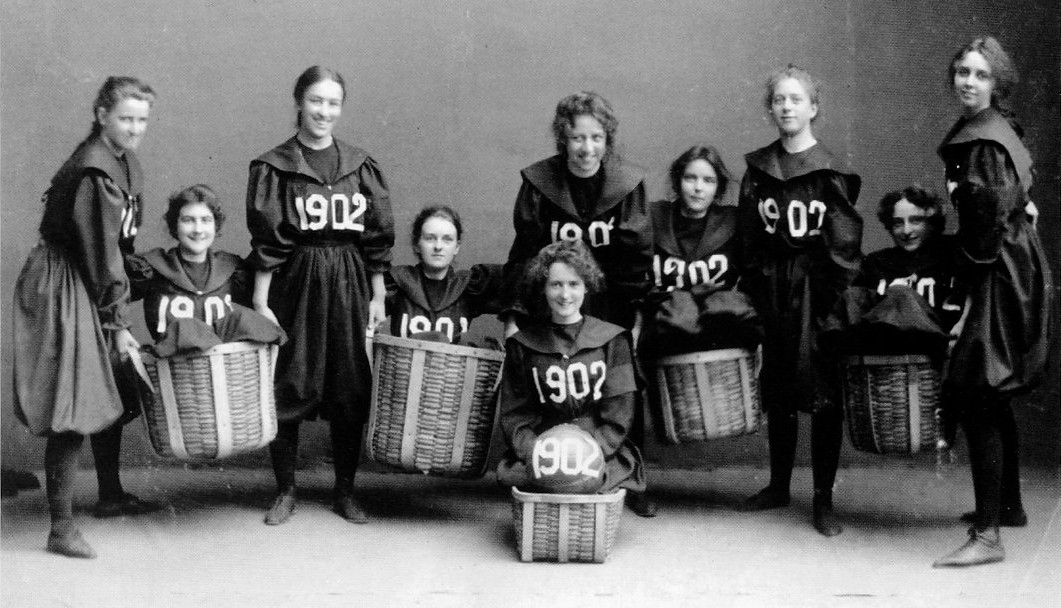
An example of late 19th-century athletic bloomers: the Smith College class of 1902 basketball team

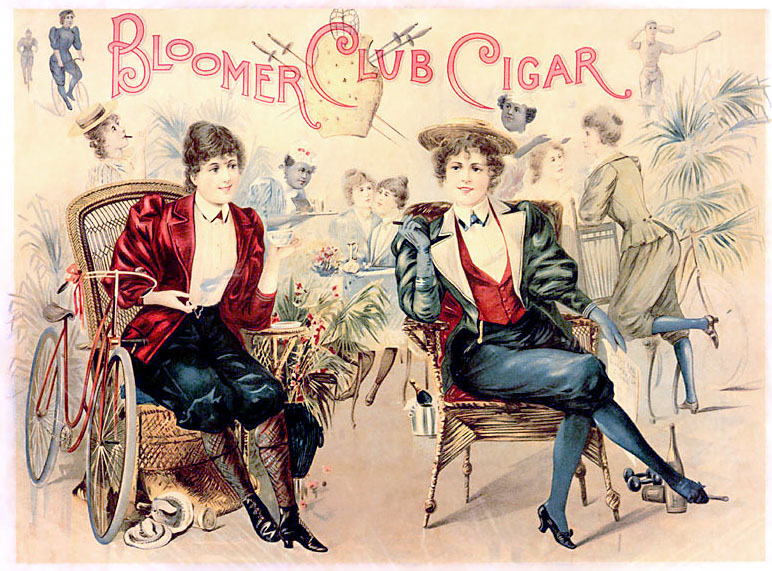
1890s caricature of athletic bloomers

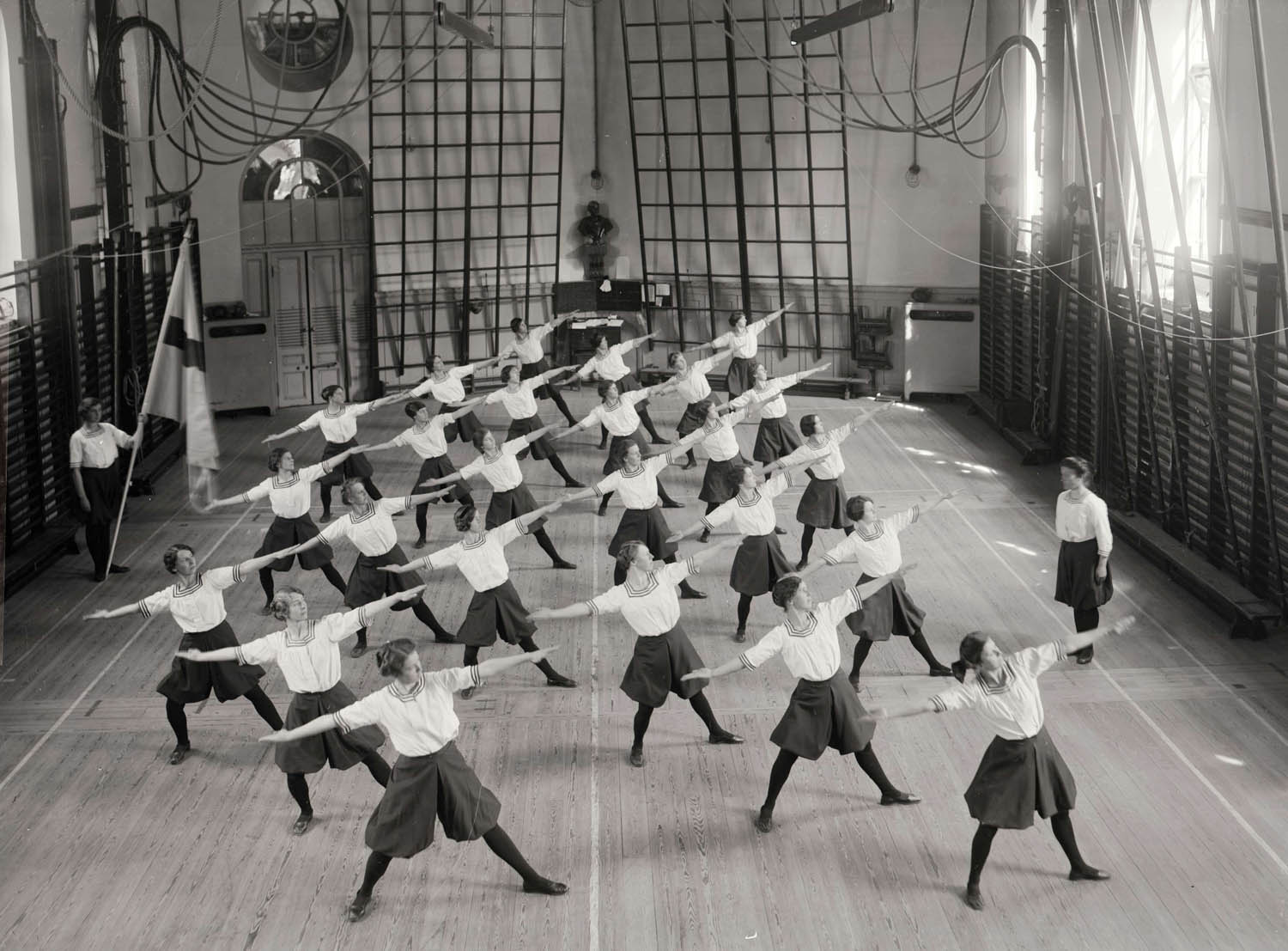
Gymnasts in Stockholm, Sweden. Early 20th century.

== Undergarments ==
Women's baggy underpants fastened to just below or above the knee are also known as "bloomers" (or as "knickers" or "directoire knickers"). They were most popular from the 1910s to the 1930s but continued to be worn by older women for several decades thereafter. The term bloomers was then often used interchangeably with the pantalettes worn by women and girls in the early 19th century and the open-leg knee-length drawers of the mid 19th and early 20th centuries. Now, bloomers often refers to any women's frilled or layered lace lower body undergarment, irrespective of length.

== See also ==
- Knickerbockers (clothing)
- Turkish salvar
- The Bloomers were supported by the National Dress Reform Association, founded in 1856.
