= Amelia Bloomer =

Women's rights activist and temperance advocate (1818–1894)

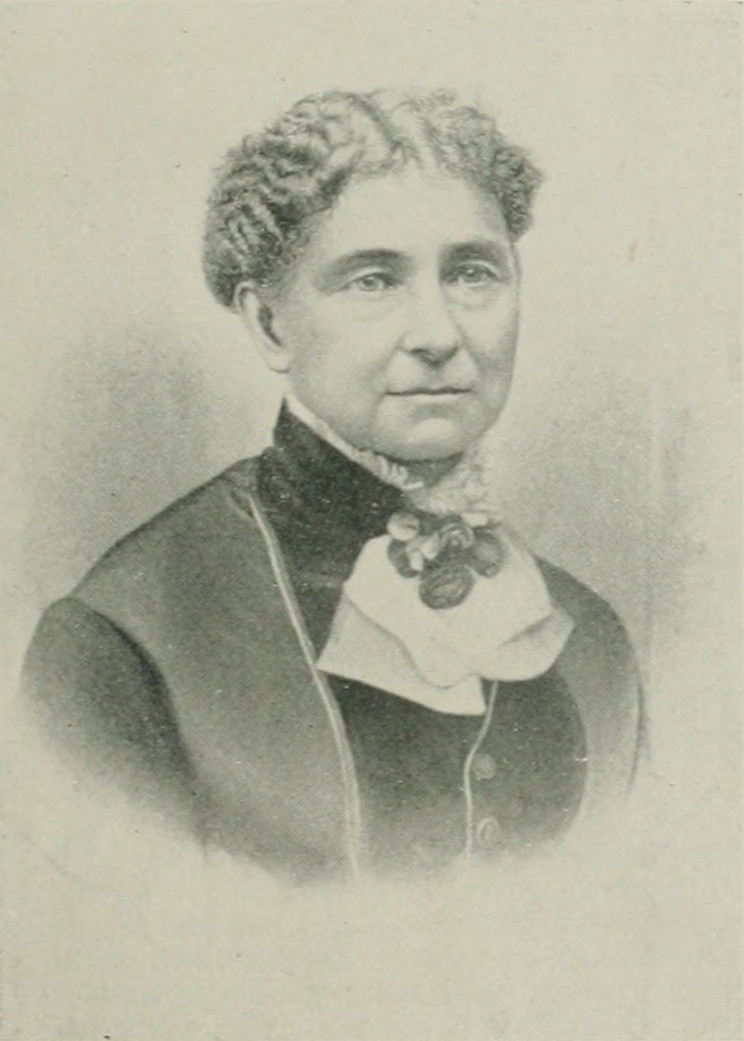
- Portrait of Bloomer from A Woman of the Century: Fourteen Hundred-seventy Biographical Sketches Accompanied by Portraits of Leading American Women in All Walks of Life by Frances Willard, 1893
- Born: Amelia Jenks; May 27, 1818; Homer, New York, U.S.
- Died: December 30, 1894 (aged 76); Council Bluffs, Iowa, U.S.
- Monuments: Amelia Bloomer House
- Occupations: Women's rights and temperance advocate
- Known for: Publicizing the idea of women wearing pants which came to be known as "Bloomers"
- Notable work: Owner/editor of The Lily
- Spouse: Dexter Bloomer (m. 1840)

Amelia Jenks Bloomer (May 27, 1818 – December 30, 1894) was an American newspaper editor, women's rights and temperance advocate. Even though she did not create the women's clothing reform style known as bloomers, her name became associated with it because of her early and strong advocacy. In her work with The Lily, she became the first woman to own, operate and edit a newspaper for women.

== Early life ==
Amelia Jenks was born in 1818 in Homer, New York, to Ananias Jenks and Lucy (Webb) Jenks. She was one of the youngest in her large family, having at least four sisters and two brothers. She came from a family of modest means and received only a few years of formal education in the local district school.

== Career ==
After a brief time as a school teacher at the age of 17, she decided to relocate, and moved in with her newly married sister Elvira, then living in Waterloo. Within a year she had moved into the home of the Oren Chamberlain family in Seneca Falls to act as the live-in governess for their three youngest children.

On April 15, 1840, before turning 22, she married law student Dexter Bloomer who encouraged her to write for his New York newspaper, the Seneca Falls County Courier. Bloomer supported her activism; he even gave up drinking as part of the Temperance Movement.

She spent her early years in Cortland County, New York. Bloomer and her family moved to Iowa in 1852.

== Social activism ==
In 1848, Bloomer attended the Seneca Falls Convention, the first women's rights convention, though she did not sign the Declaration of Sentiments and subsequent resolutions, due to her deep connection with the Episcopal Church. This meeting would serve as her inspiration to start her newspaper.

The following year, she began editing the first newspaper by and for women, The Lily. Published biweekly from 1849 until 1853, the newspaper began as a temperance journal, but came to have a broad mix of contents ranging from recipes to moralist tracts, particularly when under the influence of suffragists Elizabeth Cady Stanton and Susan B. Anthony. Bloomer felt that because women lecturers were considered unseemly, writing was the best way for women to work for reform. Originally, The Lily was to be for "home distribution" among members of the Seneca Falls Ladies Temperance Society, which had formed in 1848, and eventually had a circulation of over 4,000. The paper encountered several obstacles early on, and the Society's enthusiasm died out. Bloomer felt a commitment to publish and assumed full responsibility for editing and publishing the paper. Originally, the title page had the legend "Published by a committee of ladies." But after 1850 – only Bloomer's name appeared on the masthead. This newspaper was a model for later periodicals focused on women's suffrage.

Bloomer described her experience as the first woman to own, operate and edit a news vehicle for women:

It was a needed instrument to spread abroad the truth of a new gospel to woman, and I could not withhold my hand to stay the work I had begun. I saw not the end from the beginning and dreamed where to my propositions to society would lead me.

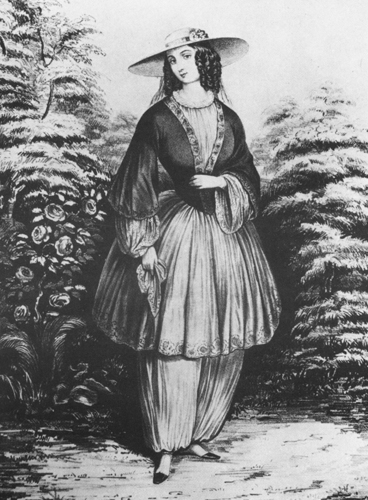
Bloomer suit

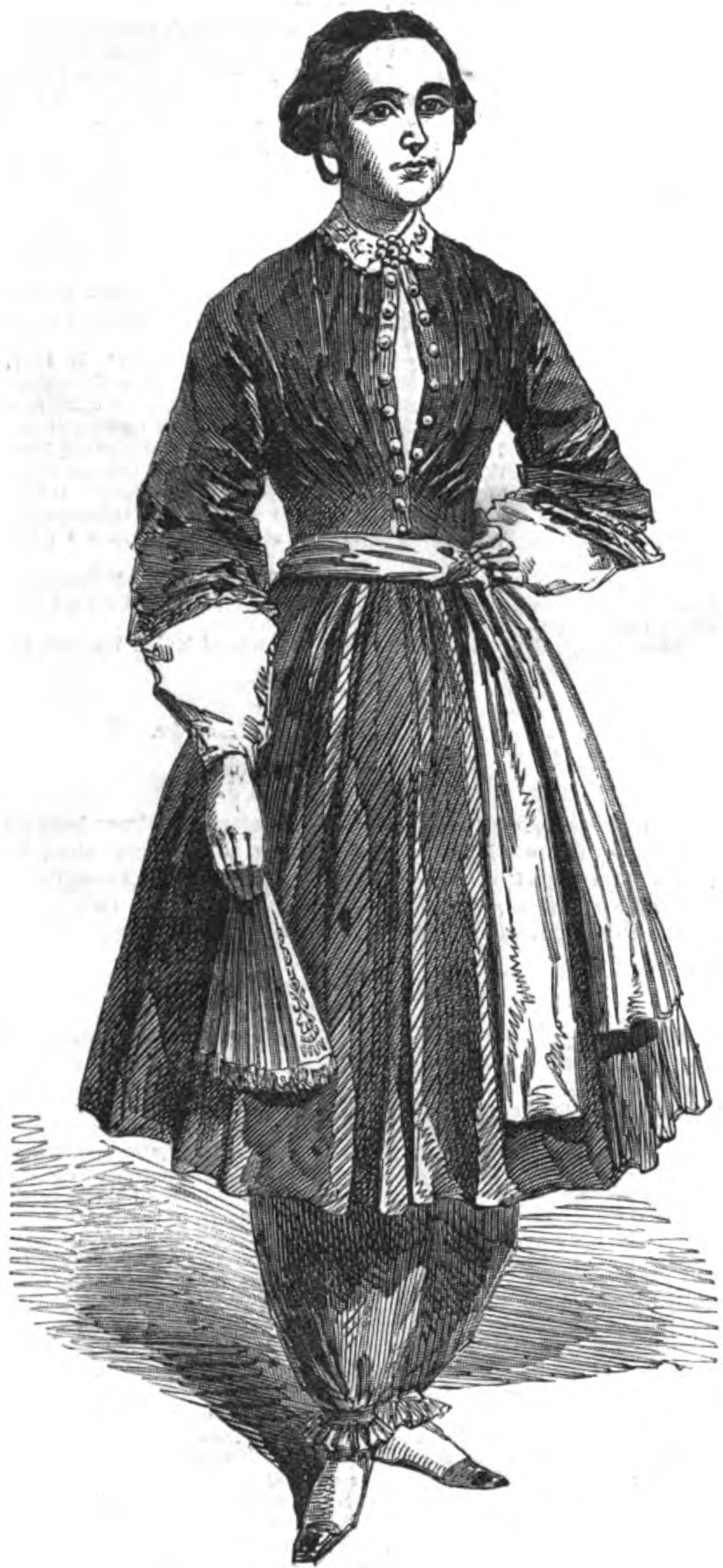
Depiction of Amelia Bloomer wearing the famous "bloomer" costume which was named after her (a tunic + "pantelettes").

In her publication, Bloomer promoted a change in dress standards for women that would be less restrictive in regular activities.

The costume of women should be suited to her wants and necessities. It should conduce at once to her health, comfort, and usefulness; and, while it should not fail also to conduce to her personal adornment, it should make that end of secondary importance.

In 1851, New England temperance activist Elizabeth Smith Miller (aka Libby Miller) adopted what she considered a more rational costume: loose trousers gathered at the ankles, like women's trousers worn in the Middle East and Central Asia, topped by a short dress or skirt and vest. Miller displayed her new clothing to Stanton, her cousin, who found it sensible and becoming, and adopted it immediately. In this garb Stanton visited Bloomer, who began to wear the costume and promote it enthusiastically in her magazine. In September 1851, Bloomer published a woodcut of herself wearing the reform dress in The Lily. Articles on the clothing trend were picked up in The New York Tribune. More women wore the fashion which was promptly dubbed The Bloomer Costume or "Bloomers". However, the Bloomers were subjected to ceaseless ridicule in the press and harassment on the street. Bloomer herself returned to longer skirts by 1859, noting that her motives were several-fold: after moving to Iowa, she felt a desire to blend in to her new social world and make friends, which she felt was easier in more fashionable garments. She also noted that a new invention, the crinoline, did away with the heavy underskirts that she had objected to, and that she felt there were other more important things for her to focus her energy on.

Also in 1851, Bloomer introduced suffragists Elizabeth Cady Stanton and Susan B. Anthony to each other.

In 1854, when Bloomer and her husband decided to move to Council Bluffs, Iowa, Bloomer sold The Lily to Mary Birdsall in Richmond, Indiana. Birdsall and Dr. Mary F. Thomas kept the publication going at least through 1859.

On July 4, 1855, Amelia Bloomer delivered a historic speech in Omaha, Nebraska, advocating for women’s rights and the right to vote. Having recently moved to Council Bluffs, Iowa, she crossed the Missouri River to participate in Omaha's Independence Day celebrations. Bloomer remained a suffrage pioneer and writer throughout her life, writing for a wide array of periodicals. Although Bloomer was far less famous than some other feminists, she made many significant contributions to the women's movement — particularly concerning dress reform. Bloomer also led suffrage campaigns in Nebraska and Iowa and served as president of the Iowa Woman Suffrage Association from 1871 until 1873.

== Death and burial ==
She died in 1894, at the age of 76, and is buried in Fairview Cemetery, Council Bluffs, Iowa.

== Commemorations ==
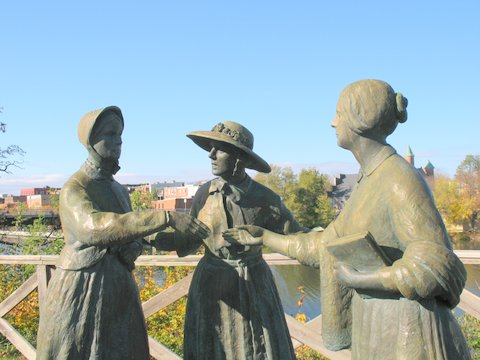
Statue, called "When Anthony Met Stanton", immortalizing the 1851 meeting of Elizabeth Cady Stanton, Susan B. Anthony and Amelia Bloomer in Seneca Falls, New York.

She is commemorated together with Elizabeth Cady Stanton, Sojourner Truth, and Harriet Ross Tubman in the calendar of saints of the Episcopal Church on July 20. In 1975 she was inducted into the Iowa Women's Hall of Fame. In 1980 her home at Seneca Falls, New York, known as the Amelia Bloomer House, was listed on the National Register of Historic Places. In 1995 she was inducted into the National Women's Hall of Fame. In 1998, the state of New York erected a historical marker dedicated to Bloomer, honoring her life and achievements. It was placed along U.S. Route 20 close to downtown Seneca Falls, however, the location is not a place of significance in Bloomer's life. In 1999 a sculpture by Ted Aub was unveiled commemorating when on May 12, 1851, Bloomer introduced Susan B. Anthony to Elizabeth Cady Stanton. This sculpture, called "When Anthony Met Stanton", consists of the three women depicted as life-size bronze statues, and is placed overlooking Van Cleef Lake in Seneca Falls, New York, where the introduction occurred.

From 2002 until 2020, the American Library Association produced an annual Amelia Bloomer List of recently published books with significant feminist content for younger readers. However, in 2020 the list's name was changed to Rise: A Feminist Book Project for Ages 0–18, explained as such: "The project has been promoting quality feminist literature for young readers since 2002 as a part of the Feminist Task Force and the Social Responsibilities Round Table [both of the American Library Association]. [In 2020,] the committee was made aware that, though Amelia Bloomer had a platform as a publisher, she refused to speak against the Fugitive Slave Law of 1850 (Simmons). (Note: Referring to "Simmons, L. (2016, September 23). Petition of Amelia Bloomer regarding suffrage in the West. National Archives. Retrieved from .)

== See also ==
- Amelia Bloomer House
- List of suffragists and suffragettes
- List of women's rights activists
- Victorian dress reform
