= The Lily (newspaper) =

First American newspaper edited by and for women

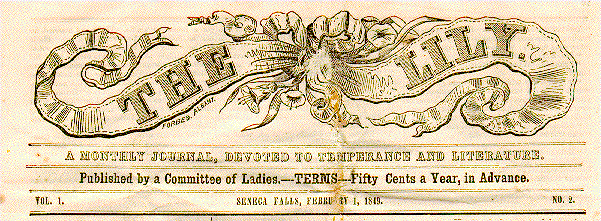
- The Lily in February 1849
- Type: Newspaper
- Owner(s): Amelia Bloomer; Mary Birdsall
- Editor: Amelia Bloomer
- Founded: 1 January 1849
- Political alignment: Temperance and Women's Rights
- Headquarters: New York City
- Sister newspapers: Seneca Falls County Courier

The Lily was the first U.S. newspaper edited by and for women. It was published from 1849 to 1853 by Amelia Jenks Bloomer (1818–1894) before she sold the newspaper to Mary Birdsall in 1854. While the newspaper initially focused on temperance, it soon broadened its focus to include the many issues of women's rights activists in the 1850s. It grew in its distribution as a result of its discussion of bloomers, a comfortable fashion popularized by Bloomer in the paper.

== Early years of publication ==
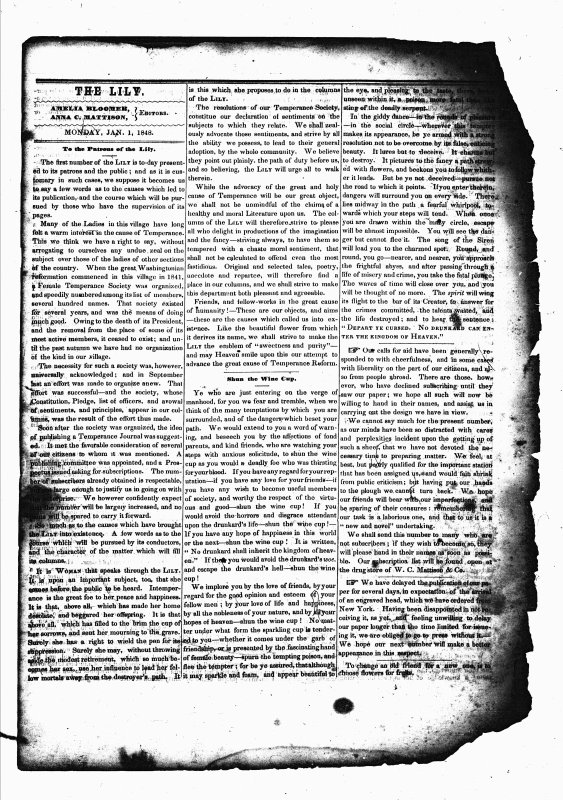
First issue of The Lily, January 1, 1849

In 1848, The Lily developed as a publication for "home distribution" among the women who belonged to the Seneca Falls Ladies Temperance Society in response to their feeling marginalized by the larger temperance movement. Enthusiasm for the project quickly faded, however. Amelia Bloomer did not want to see the paper die, so she took on responsibility for editing and publishing the paper. Bloomer's initial interest was not in women's rights, but in temperance, and this topic featured prominently in its early issues, even after the paper detached from the Temperance Society. Bloomer believed that women writing in pursuit of reform was less unseemly than giving speeches or lectures.

The first issues were priced at 50 cents a year and published in Seneca Falls, New York, as a monthly, eight-page, three-column publication. The inaugural issue, published on January 1, 1849, set forth the philosophy and initial goals: "It is WOMAN that speaks through the LILY. It is upon an important subject, too, that she comes before the public to be heard. Intemperance is the great foe to her peace and happiness." Bloomer wrote, "The Lily was the first paper devoted to the interests of woman and, so far as I know, the first one owned, edited and published by a woman." Initially, the title page celebrated this by announcing that it was "Published by a committee of ladies", but after 1850, the masthead featured Bloomer's name alone.

Far from radical, the initial publication focused on temperance issues, showing women as "defenders of the home". In the first issue, Bloomer wrote:

It is woman that speaks through The Lily ... Intemperance is the great foe to her peace and happiness. It is that above all that has made her Home desolate and beggared her offspring .... Surely, she has the right to wield her pen for its Suppression. Surely, she may without throwing aside the modest refinements which so much become her sex, use her influence to lead her fellow mortals from the destroyer’s path.

== Developing focus on women's rights ==
As the newspaper evolved, its focus shifted to include broader issues of women's rights. This expansion of focus was partly through the influence of Elizabeth Cady Stanton, a contributor to The Lily, who wrote under the pseudonym "sunflower". By 1850 the Lily described itself as "DEVOTED TO THE INTERESTS OF WOMEN", and by 1852, it described itself as dedicated to "Emancipation of Woman from Intemperance, Injustice, Prejudice, and Bigotry". Bloomer involved many editors and contributors who helped one another with the publication process, and this became a model for later periodicals focused on women's suffrage. Other early periodicals edited by women that focused on women's issues and protests include The Genius of Liberty (1851–1853), edited by Elizabeth Aldrich; The Pioneer and Woman's Advocate (1852–1853), edited by Ann W. Spencer; The Una (1853–1855), edited by Paula Wright Davis; The Revolution (1868–1872), edited by Susan B. Anthony, Elizabeth Cady Stanton, and Parker Pillsbury; The Woman's Advocate, (1855–1858), and The Sibyl (1856–1864), edited by Lydia Hasbrouck.

One source describes the range of contents within The Lily, "An intriguing mix of contents ranging from recipes to moralist tracts, The Lily captivated readers from a broad spectrum of women and slowly educated them not only about the truth of women's inequities but in the possibilities of major social reform." Throughout its publication, the newspaper contained reminders about the importance of temperance and the horrors of alcohol. For example, a May 1849 issue contained the following example: "A man when drunk fell into a kettle of boiling brine at Liverpool, Onondaga Co. and was scaled to death."

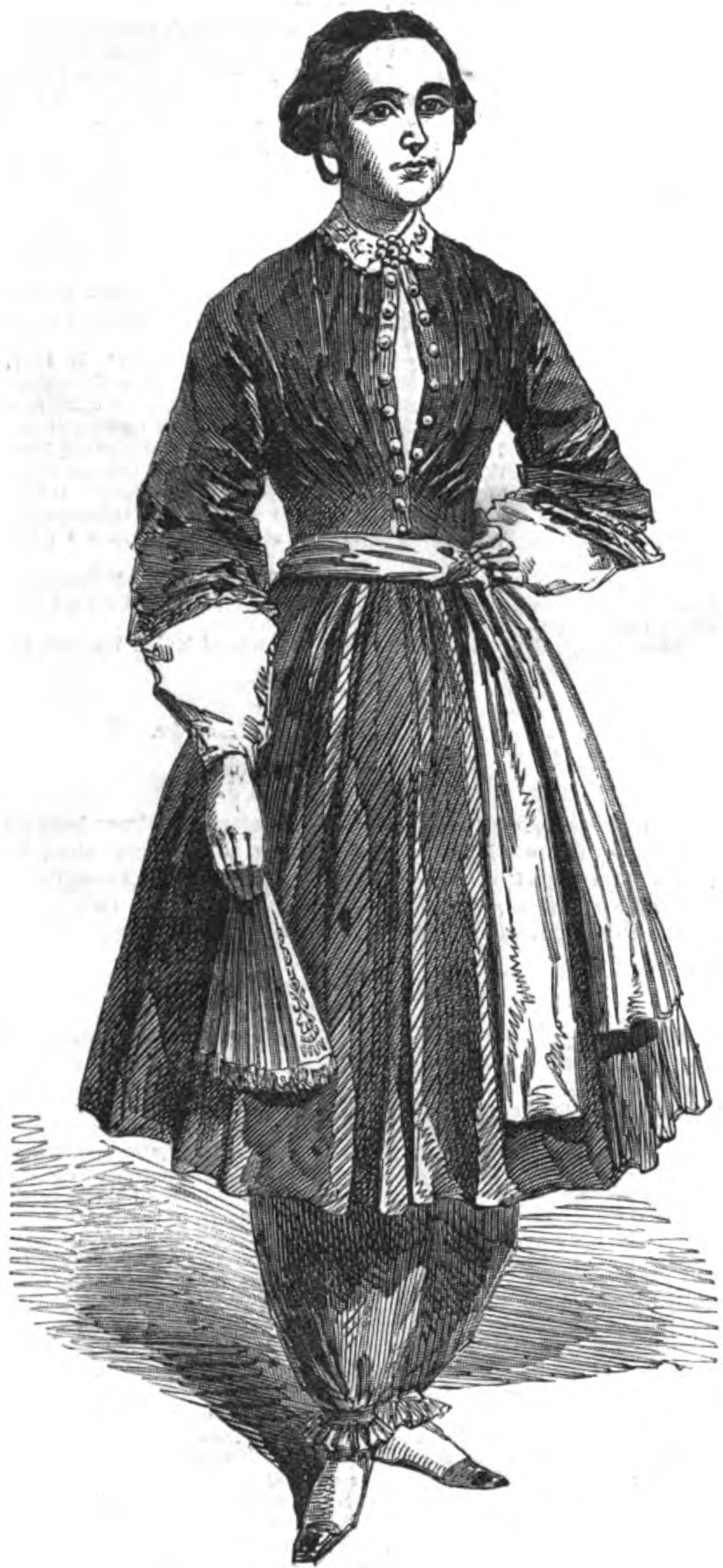
Depiction of Amelia Bloomer wearing the famous "bloomer" costume, which was named after her (a tunic + "pantelettes")

"The Bloomer Costume", that Bloomer became known for, an outfit consisting of a tunic and pantelettes, was also visible in the paper. While Bloomer did not create this outfit, she defended it in The Lily. These articles were later picked up by The New York Tribune. Bloomer's articles about this style of dress, along with illustrations, sewing instructions, and tales of women who embraced bloomers that were printed in The Lily, led the style to become viewed as Bloomer's creation. She explained that this clothing style was essential to the health and safety of women, by reducing risks from carrying children and candles up stairs. She recalled, "As soon as it became known that I was wearing the new dress, letters came pouring in upon me by the hundreds from women all over the country making inquiries about the dress and asking for patterns – showing how ready and anxious women were to throw off the burden of long, heavy skirts." While Bloomer and others eventually discarded this outfit because it shifted people's focus from women's right to clothing, The Lily played a key role in publicizing this outfit that would help change norms of women's dress in the U.S. The Lily rose from a circulation of 500 a month to 4000 a month, with some of the increase because of its discussion of women's bloomers and dress reform.

Reflecting, Bloomer described her feelings about being the first woman to run a newspaper for women, "It was a needed instrument to spread abroad the truth of a new gospel to woman, and I could not withhold my hand to stay the work I had begun. I saw not the end from the beginning and dreamed where to my propositions to society would lead me." The newspaper modeled how a newspaper could inspire a sense of community and continuity among suffrage leaders, one source describes.

== Later years of publication ==
In the early 1850s, the relationship between the temperance movement and the women's struggle for suffrage became more pronounced in The Lily. In an article, Elizabeth Cady Stanton, a Lily contributor, demanded that women be included in lawmaking to restrict liquor sales and divorce intemperate men. Bloomer wrote that "the only way in which women can do anything effectually in this [temperance] cause is through the ballot-box," a position she called "a strong women's rights sentiment". The Lily published articles not only on women's suffrage but also on major social reform issues such as property rights, education, employment, dress reform, and slavery, including women's slavery to men. Increasingly the newspaper saw solutions to the dangers of drunken husbands to lie in greater rights for women and larger structural changes. One source recounts an 1853 mission statement printed in the paper that explained that The Lily would "labour for the emancipation of women not only from 'unjust laws' but also 'from the destructive influences of Custom and Fashion.'"

In a biography of Amelia Bloomer written by her husband, she is quoted as declaring that she never liked the "pretty" name of the paper (appointed by the local women's temperance society), but since the newspaper soon became known far and wide by that name, she decided not to change it.

By 1853, the paper had a national circulation of 6000, and Bloomer continued producing it from Mount Vernon, Ohio, after Bloomer moved with her husband, Dexter Bloomer. In 1854 or 1855, Amelia Bloomer sold the paper to Mary Birdsall because she was moving to a new house in Council Bluffs, Iowa, which lacked facilities for newspaper publication. Bloomer continued as a corresponding editor. Birdsall had been an editor of the Indiana Farmer, including its section on women. She supported Bloomer's views, and the newspaper provided a vehicle for her to continue her journalism. The newspaper continued to campaign for women's issues and temperance. Under Birdsall, the paper was published in Richmond, Indiana, for some years and was distributed nationally. Dr. Mary F. Thomas helped Birdsall edit and publish the paper. Sources differ on when last issue was published—sources give varying dates from 1856 to 1870 as the last date the paper was published.

== See also ==
- Die Deutsche Frauen-Zeitung
- The Una
