= George Kingston =

George Kingston may refer to:

- George Strickland Kingston (1807–1880), surveyor, architect and politician in South Australia
- George Kingston (meteorologist) (1816–1886), Canadian meteorologist
- George Kingston (ice hockey) (born 1939), ice hockey coach and the first coach of the San Jose Sharks
- George Kingston (carburetor) (1863–1946), inventor of the carburetor
- George Frederick Kingston (1889–1950), Canadian Anglican bishop
