= History of Indiana =

- The seal of Indiana reflects the state's pioneer era

Historical Periods
- Pre-history: until 1670
- French Rule: 1679–1763
- British Rule: 1763–1783
- U.S. Territorial Period: 1783–1816
- Indiana Statehood: 1816–present

Major Events
- Tecumseh's War War of 1812: 1810–1815
- Constitutional convention: June 1816
- Polly v. Lasselle: 1820
- Capitol moved to Indianapolis: 1825
- Passage of the Mammoth Internal Improvement Act: 1831
- State Bankruptcy: 1841
- 2nd Constitution: 1851
- Civil War: 1860–1865
- Gas Boom: 1887–1905
- Harrison elected president: 1888
- KKK scandal: 1925

The history of human activity in Indiana, a U.S. state in the Midwest, stems back to the migratory tribes of Native Americans who inhabited Indiana as early as 8000 BC. Tribes succeeded one another in dominance for several thousand years and reached their peak of development during the period of the Mississippian culture. The region entered recorded history in the 1670s, when the first Europeans came to Indiana and claimed the territory for the Kingdom of France. After France ruled for a century (with little settlement in this area), it was defeated by the Kingdom of Great Britain in the French and Indian War (Seven Years' War) and ceded its territory east of the Mississippi River. Britain held the land for more than twenty years, until after its defeat in the American Revolutionary War. Britain then ceded the entire trans-Allegheny region, including what is now Indiana, to the newly formed United States.

The U.S. government divided the trans-Allegheny region into several new territories. The largest of these was the Northwest Territory, which the U.S. Congress subsequently subdivided into several smaller territories. In 1800, Indiana Territory became the first of these new territories established. As Indiana Territory grew in population and development, it was divided in 1805 and again in 1809 until, reduced to its current size and boundaries, it retained the name Indiana and was admitted to the Union on December 11, 1816, as the nineteenth state.

The newly established state government set out on an ambitious plan to transform Indiana from a segment of the frontier into a developed, well-populated, and thriving state. The state founders initiated an internal improvement program that led to the construction of roads, canals, railroads, and state-funded public schools. Despite the noble aims of the project, profligate spending ruined the state's credit. By 1841, the state was near bankruptcy and was forced to liquidate most of its public works. Acting under its new Constitution of 1851, the state government enacted major financial reforms, required that most public offices be filled by election rather than appointment, and greatly weakened the power of the governor. The ambitious development program of Indiana's founders was realized when Indiana became the fourth-largest state in terms of population, as measured by the 1860 United States census.

Indiana became politically influential and played an important role in the Union during the American Civil War. Indiana was the first western state to mobilize for the war, and its soldiers participated in almost every engagement during the war. Following the Civil War, Indiana remained politically important as it became a critical swing state in U.S. presidential elections. It helped decide control of the presidency for three decades.

During the Indiana Gas Boom of the late 19th century, industry began to develop rapidly in the state. The state's Golden Age of Literature began in the same time period, increasing its cultural influence. By the early 20th century, Indiana developed into a strong manufacturing state and attracted numerous immigrants and internal migrants to its industries. It experienced setbacks during the Great Depression of the 1930s. Construction of the Indianapolis Motor Speedway, expansion of the auto industry, urban development, and two wars contributed to the state's industrial growth. During the second half of the 20th century, Indiana became a leader in the pharmaceutical industry due to the innovations of companies such as Indiana based Eli Lilly.

== Early civilizations ==
Following the end of the last glacial period, about twenty thousand years ago, Indiana's topography was dominated by spruce and pine forests and was home to mastodon, caribou, and saber-toothed cats. While northern Indiana had been covered by glaciers, southern Indiana remained unaltered by the ice's advance, leaving plants and animals that could sustain human communities. Indiana's earliest known inhabitants were Paleo-Indians. Evidence exists that humans were in Indiana as early as the Archaic stage (8000–6000 BC). Hunting camps of the nomadic Clovis culture have been found in Indiana. Carbon dating of artifacts found in the Wyandotte Caves of southern Indiana shows humans mined flint there as early 2000 BC. They ate quantities of freshwater mussels from local streams, as shown by their shell mounds found throughout southern Indiana.

The Early Woodland period in Indiana came between 1000 BC and 200 AD and produced the Adena culture. It shows evidence of domestication of wild squash and pottery production. They also built burial mounds; one of which has been dated as the oldest earthwork in Anderson's Mounds State Park.

In the Middle Woodland period we see artifacts linked to the Hopewell interaction sphere in Indiana as early as 200 BC. This is the first culture to show evidence of permanent settlements in Indiana. About 1 AD, we see evidence of sunflowers and squash cultivation. Around 200 AD, we see the construction mounds used for ceremonies and burials. We see evidnece of trade with other native regions as far away as Central America. For unknown reasons, the Hopewell sphere went into decline around 400 and was later supplanted.

The Late Woodland era is generally considered to have begun about 600 AD and lasted until the arrival of Europeans in Indiana. It was a period of rapid cultural change. One of the new developments was the introduction of masonry, shown by the construction of large, stone forts, many of which overlook the Ohio River. Romantic legend attributed the forts to Welsh Indians, who supposedly arrived centuries before Christopher Columbus reached the Caribbean; however, archaeologists and other scholars have found no evidence for that theory and demonstrate that the cultural development was made by the Mississippian culture.

=== Mississippians ===
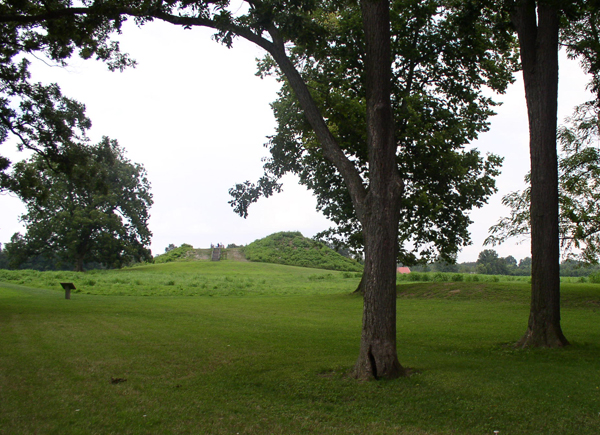
View of Mound A at Angel Mounds

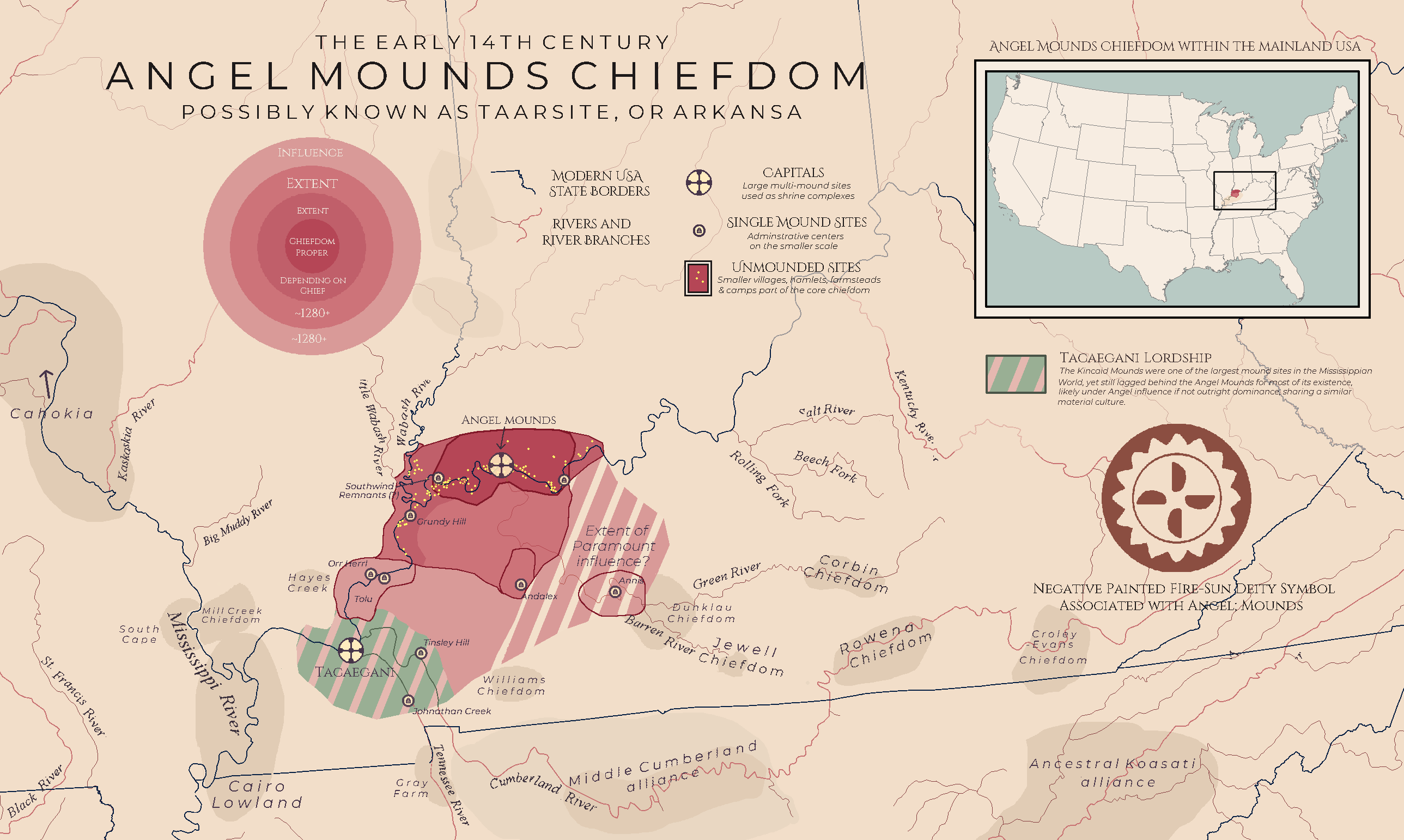
Map of the polity centered at the Angel Mounds site.

Evidence suggests that after the collapse of the Hopewell, Indiana had a low population until the rise of the Fort Ancient and Mississippian culture around 900 AD. The Ohio River Valley was densely populated by peoples practising the Mississippian culture from about 1100 to 1450 AD. Their settlements, like those of the Hopewell, were known for their ceremonial earthwork mounds. Some of these remain visible at locations near the Ohio River. The Mississippian mounds were constructed on a larger scale than the mounds built by the Hopewell. The agrarian Mississippian culture was the first to grow maize in the region. The people also developed the bow and arrow and copper working during this time period.

Mississippian polities had larger populations and thus more political complexity than their predecessors. The largest Mississippian polity was likely Cahokia (in Illinois and Missouri), which contained as many as 30,000 inhabitants. They had a class society with certain groups specialising such as for example artisans. The ruling class held related political and religious positions. Their cities were typically sited near rivers. Representing their cosmology, the central developments were dominated by a large central mound, several smaller mounds, and a large open plaza. Wooden palisades were built later around the complex, apparently for defensive purposes. Mississippian houses were generally square-shaped with plastered walls and thatched roofs.

Many archaeological sites in southern Indiana were at various times under the government of the Angel Mounds polity centered at the Angel Mounds site. Originally founded by a Cahokian-derived movement just before 1050, the rise of the Angel Mounds polity and its ruler was marked by the alignments of buildings and temple mounds in sites like Tolu and Annis to the so-called "Angel Axis," the orientation of the Angel Mounds to a specific lunar movement. Soil depletion, deforestation and climate change all combined with the end of Cahokia in the 14th century, significantly weakened the country. A slow hundred year long decline began and the population started moving west to the confluence of the Wabash and Ohio, the region began to be reorganised into what archaeologists identify as the Caborn-Welborn culture, which was possibly encountered by French explorers as the "Taarsite" nation. Maize became a smaller part of local diets, but trade routes kept their grand size, if not grew. Arrowheads from as far south as Arkansas, gorget-masks from upstream, artefacts from the inhabitants of Illinois, and European goods were all traded through the region. Caborn-Welborn is seen as a confederation of various groups and classes, rulers, entrepreneurs and commoners alike.

=== European contact ===
It was during this period that American bison began a periodic east–west trek through Indiana, crossing the Falls of the Ohio and the Wabash River near modern-day Vincennes. These herds became important to civilizations in southern Indiana and created a well-established Buffalo Trace, later used by European-American pioneers moving west.

In the 1600s, a major series of wars broke out in the eastern woodlands, now called the Beaver Wars. The Five Haudenosaunee nations led by the Seneca began to battle against their neighbors for a monopoly over the beaver trade. They were opposed by various local nations such as the Shawnee, Miami, Wea, Pottawatomie, and the Illinois. Many of them were semi-nomadic, used stone tools rather than copper, and did not create the large-scale construction and farming works of their Mississippian predecessors. The war continued with sporadic fighting until 1701 when the Treaty of Montreal was signed. They achieved this goal for several decades. During the war, the Iroquois drove many people from the Ohio Valley to the south and west.

As a result of the war, several tribes, including the Shawnee, migrated into Indiana, where they attempted to resettle in land belonging to the Miami. The Iroquois gained the military advantage after they were supplied with firearms by the Europeans. With their superior weapons, the Iroquois subjugated at least thirty tribes and nearly destroyed several others in northern Indiana.

When the first Europeans entered Indiana during the 1670s, the region was in the final years of the Beaver Wars. The French attempted to trade with the Algonquian tribes in Indiana, selling them firearms in exchange for furs. This incurred the wrath of the Iroquois, who destroyed a French outpost in Indiana in retaliation. To thwart the Iroquois, the French continued to supply the western tribes with firearms and openly allied with the Algonquian tribes. A major battle—and a turning point in the conflict—occurred near present-day South Bend when the Miami and their allies repulsed a large Iroquois army in an ambush. With the firearms they received from the French, the odds were evened. The war finally ended in 1701 with the Great Peace of Montreal. Both sides were left exhausted, having suffered heavy casualties. Much of Ohio, Michigan, and Indiana was depopulated after many tribes fled west to escape the fighting. The Haudenosaunee kept control of Ohio country for hunting grounds and settlement.

The Miami and Pottawatomie nations returned to Indiana following the war. Other tribes, such as the Lenape, were pushed westward into the Midwest from the East Coast by encroachment of European colonists. Around 1770 the Miami invited the Lenape to settle on the White River. (Note: In negotiations at the settlement of Greenville, Chief Little Turtle of the Miami Tribe asserted a Miami claim to half of what became present-day Ohio, all of present-day Indiana, and eastern portions of present-day Illinois, including Chicago.) The Shawnee arrived in present-day Indiana after the three other nations. These four nations were later participants in the Sixty Years' War, a struggle between native nations and European settlers for control of the Great Lakes region. The Piankeshaw killed five French fur traders in 1752 near the Vermilion River. Nevertheless, they continued to trade successfully with the French for decades.

== Colonial period ==
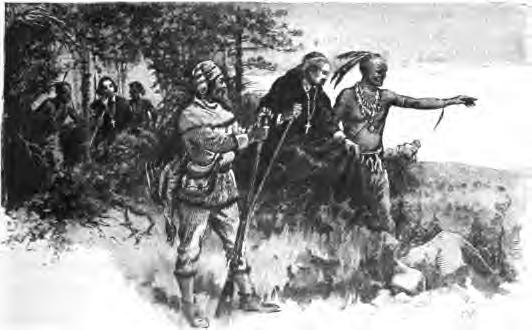
Native Americans guide French explorers through Indiana as depicted by Maurice Thompson in Stories of Indiana.

French fur traders from Canada were the first Europeans to enter Indiana, beginning in the 1670s. The quickest route connecting the New France districts of Canada and Louisiana ran along Indiana's Wabash River. The Terre Haute highlands were once considered the border between the two French districts. Indiana's geographical location made it a vital part of French lines of communication and trade routes. The French established Vincennes as a permanent settlement in Indiana during European rule, but the population of the area remained primarily Native American. As French influence grew in the region, Great Britain, competing with France for control of North America, came to believe that control of Indiana was important to halt French expansion on the continent.

=== France ===
The first European outpost within the present-day boundaries of Indiana was Tassinong, a French trading post established in 1673 near the Kankakee River. (Note: Photo available at Historical Marker Database. Retrieved on May 13, 2008.) French explorer René-Robert Cavelier, Sieur de La Salle, came to the area in 1679, claiming it for King Louis XIV of France. La Salle came to explore a portage between the St. Joseph and Kankakee rivers, and Father Ribourde, who traveled with La Salle, marked trees along the way. The marks survived to be photographed in the 19th century. In 1681, La Salle negotiated a common defense treaty between the Illinois and Miami nations against the Iroquois.

Further exploration of Indiana led to the French establishing an important trade route between Canada and Louisiana via the Maumee and Wabash rivers. The French built a series of forts and outposts in Indiana as a hedge against the westward expansion of the British colonies from the east coast of North America and to encourage trade with the native tribes. The tribes were able to procure metal tools, cooking utensils, and other manufactured items in exchange for animal pelts. The French built Fort Miamis in the Miami town of Kekionga (modern-day Fort Wayne, Indiana). France assigned Jean Baptiste Bissot, Sieur de Vincennes, as the first agent to the Miami at Kekionga.

In 1717, François-Marie Picoté de Belestre (Note: The father of François-Marie Picoté de Belestre) established the post of Fort Ouiatenon (southwest of modern-day West Lafayette, Indiana) to discourage the Wea from coming under British influence. In 1732, François-Marie Bissot, Sieur de Vincennes, established a similar post near the Piankeshaw in the town that still bears his name. Although the forts were garrisoned by men from New France, Fort Vincennes was the only outpost to maintain a permanent European presence until the present day. Jesuit priests accompanied many of the French soldiers into Indiana in an attempt to convert the natives to Christianity. The Jesuits conducted missionary activities, lived among the natives and learned their languages, and accompanied them on hunts and migrations. Gabriel Marest, one of the first missionaries in Indiana, taught among the Kaskaskia as early as 1712. The missionaries came to have great influence among the natives and played an important role in keeping the native tribes allied with the French.

During the French and Indian War, the North American front of the Seven Years' War in Europe, the British directly challenged France for control of the region. Although no pitched battles occurred in Indiana, the native tribes of the region supported the French. At the beginning of the war, the tribes sent large groups of warriors to support the French in resisting the British advance and to raid British colonies. Using Fort Pitt as a forward base, British commander Robert Rogers overcame the native resistance and drove deep into the frontier to capture Fort Detroit. The rangers moved south from Detroit and captured many of the key French outposts in Indiana, including Fort Miamis and Fort Vincennes. As the war progressed, the French lost control of Canada after the fall of Montreal. No longer able to effectively fight the British in interior North America, they lost Indiana to British forces. By 1761, the French were entirely forced out of Indiana. Following the French expulsion, native tribes led by Chief Pontiac confederated in an attempt to rebel against the British without French assistance. While Pontiac was besieging British-held Fort Detroit, other tribes in Indiana rose up against the British, who were forced to surrender Fort Miamis and Fort Ouiatenon. In 1763, while Pontiac was fighting the British, the French signed the Treaty of Paris and ceded control of Indiana to the British.

=== Great Britain ===
When the British gained control of Indiana, the entire region was in the middle of Pontiac's Rebellion. During the next year, British officials negotiated with the various tribes, splitting them from their alliance with Pontiac. Eventually, Pontiac lost most of his allies, forcing him to make peace with the British on July 25, 1766. As a concession to Pontiac, Great Britain issued a proclamation that the territory west of the Appalachian Mountains was to be reserved for Native Americans. Despite the treaty, Pontiac was still considered a threat to British interests, but after he was murdered on April 20, 1769, the region saw several years of peace.

After Britain established peace with the natives, many of the former French trading posts and forts in the region were abandoned. Fort Miamis was maintained for several years because it was considered to be "of great importance", but even it was eventually abandoned. The Jesuit priests were expelled, and no provisional government was established; the British hoped the French in the area would leave. Many did leave, but the British gradually became more accommodating to the French who remained and continued the fur trade with the Native American nations.

Formal use of the word Indiana dates from 1768, when a Philadelphia-based trading company gave their land claim in the present-day state of West Virginia the name of Indiana in honor of its previous owners, the Iroquois. Later, ownership of the claim was transferred to the Indiana Land Company, the first recorded use of the word Indiana. However, the Virginia colony argued that it was the rightful owner of the land because it fell within its geographic boundaries. The U.S. Supreme Court extinguished the land company's right to the claim in 1798.

In 1773, the territory that included present-day Indiana was brought under the administration of Province of Quebec to appease its French population. The Quebec Act was one of the Intolerable Acts that the thirteen British colonies cited as a reason for the outbreak of the American Revolutionary War. The Thirteen Colonies thought themselves entitled to the territory for their support of Great Britain during the French and Indian War, and were incensed that it was given to the enemy the colonies had been fighting.

Although the United States gained official possession of the region following the conclusion of the American Revolutionary War, British influence on its Native American allies in the region remained strong, especially near Fort Detroit. This influence caused the Northwest Indian War, which began when British-influenced native tribes refused to recognize American authority and were backed in their resistance by British merchants and officials in the area. American military victories in the region and the ratification of the Jay Treaty, which called for British withdrawal from the region's forts, caused a formal evacuation, but the British were not fully expelled from the area until the conclusion of the War of 1812.

=== United States ===
After the outbreak of the American Revolutionary War, George Rogers Clark was sent from Virginia to enforce its claim to much of the land in the Great Lakes region. In July 1778, Clark and about 175 men crossed the Ohio River and took control of Kaskaskia, Cahokia, and Vincennes, along with several other villages in British Indiana. The occupation was accomplished without firing a shot because Clark carried letters from the French ambassador stating that France supported the Americans. These letters made most of the French and Native American inhabitants of the area unwilling to support the British.

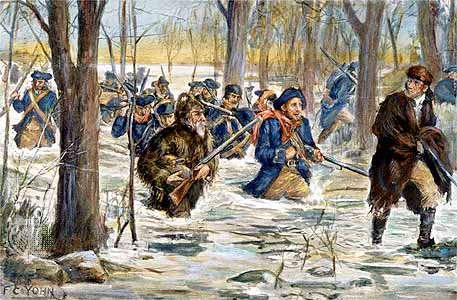
Clark's march to Vincennes, by F. C. Yohn

The fort at Vincennes, which the British had renamed Fort Sackville, had been abandoned years earlier and no garrison was present when the Americans arrived to occupy it. Captain Leonard Helm became the first American commandant at Vincennes. To counter Clark's advance, British forces under Lieutenant Governor Henry Hamilton recaptured Vincennes with a small force. In February 1779, Clark arrived at Vincennes in a surprise winter expedition and retook the town, capturing Hamilton in the process. This expedition secured most of southern Indiana for the United States.

In 1780, emulating Clark's success at Vincennes, French officer Augustin de La Balme organized a militia force of French residents to capture Fort Detroit. While marching to Detroit, the militia stopped to sack Kekionga. The delay proved fatal when the expedition met Miami warriors led by Chief Little Turtle along the Eel River. The entire militia was killed or captured. Clark organized another assault on Fort Detroit in 1781, but it was aborted when Chief Joseph Brant captured a significant part of Clark's army at a battle known as Lochry's Defeat, near present-day Aurora, Indiana. Other minor skirmishes occurred in Indiana, including the battle at Petit fort in 1780. In 1783, when the war came to an end, Britain ceded the entire trans-Allegheny region to the United States—including Indiana—under the terms of the Treaty of Paris.

Clark's militia was under the authority of the Commonwealth of Virginia, although a Continental Flag was flown over Fort Sackville, which he renamed Fort Patrick Henry in honor of an American patriot. Later that year, the areas formerly known as Illinois Country and Ohio Country were organized as Illinois County, Virginia until the colony relinquished its control of the area to the U.S. government in 1784. Clark was awarded large tracts of land in southern Indiana for his service in the war. Present-day Clark County and Clarksville are named in his honor.

== Indiana Territory ==
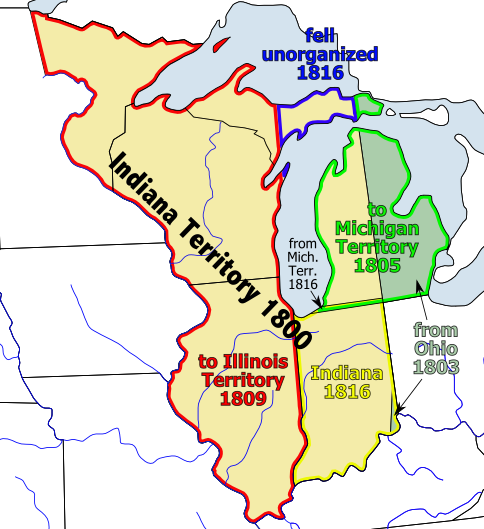
Map of the Indiana Territory

=== Northwest Indian War ===
Passage of the Land Ordinance of 1785 and the Northwest Ordinance of 1787 committed the U.S. government to continued plans for western expansion, causing increasing tensions with native tribes who occupied the western lands. In 1785 the conflict erupted into the Northwest Indian War. American troops made several unsuccessful attempts to end the native rebellion. During the fall of 1790, U.S. troops under the command of General Josiah Harmar pursued the Miami tribe near present-day Fort Wayne, Indiana, but had to retreat. Major Jean François Hamtramck's expedition to other native villages in the area also failed when it was forced to return to Vincennes due to lack of sufficient provisions. In 1791 Major General Arthur St. Clair, who was also the Northwest Territory's governor, commanded about 2,700 men in a campaign to establish a chain of forts in the area near the Miami capital of Kekionga; however, nearly a 1,000 warriors under the leadership of Chief Little Turtle launched a surprise attack on the American camp, forcing the militia's retreat. St. Clair's Defeat remains the U.S. Army's worst by Native Americans in history. Casualties included 623 federal soldiers killed and another 258 wounded; the Indian confederacy lost an estimated 100 men.

St. Clair's loss led to the appointment of General "Mad Anthony" Wayne, who organized the Legion of the United States and defeated a Native American force at the Battle of Fallen Timbers in August 1794. The Treaty of Greenville (1795) ended the war and marked the beginning of a series of land cession treaties. Under the terms of the Treaty, native tribes ceded most of southern and eastern Ohio and a strip of southeastern Indiana to the U.S. government. This ethnic cleansing opened the area for white settlement. Fort Wayne was built at Kekionga to represent United States sovereignty over the Ohio-Indiana frontier. After the treaty was signed, the powerful Miami nation considered themselves allies of the United States. During the 18th century, Native Americans were victorious in 31 of the 37 recorded incidents with white settlers in the territory.

=== Territory formation ===
The Congress of the Confederation formed the Northwest Territory under the terms of the Northwest Ordinance on July 13, 1787. This territory, which initially included land bounded by the Appalachian Mountains, the Mississippi River, the Great Lakes, and the Ohio River, was subsequently partitioned into the Indiana Territory (1800), Michigan Territory (1805), and the Illinois Territory (1809), and later became the states of Ohio, Michigan, Indiana, Illinois, Wisconsin, and part of eastern Minnesota. The Northwest Ordinance outlined the basis for government in these western lands and an administrative structure to oversee the territory, as well as a process for achieving statehood, while the Land Ordinance of 1785 called for the U.S. government to survey the territory for future sale and development.

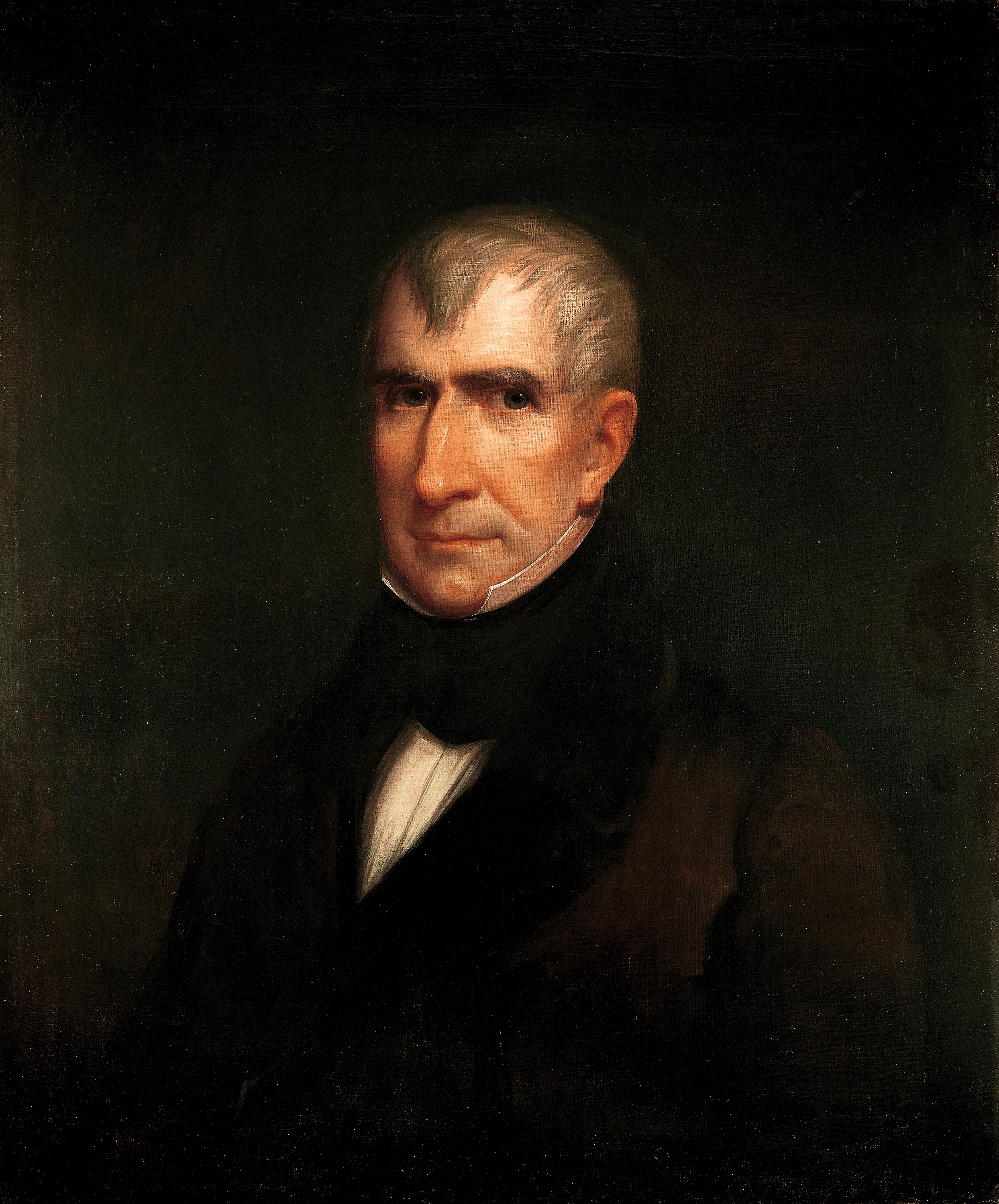
William Henry Harrison, the 1st Governor of Indiana Territory from 1801 to 1812, and the 9th President of the United States

On May 7, 1800, the U.S. Congress passed legislation to establish the Indiana Territory, effective July 4, 1800, by dividing the Northwest Territory in preparation for Ohio's statehood, which occurred in 1803. At the time the Indiana Territory was created, there were only two main American settlements in what became the state of Indiana: Vincennes and Clark's Grant. When the Indiana Territory was established in 1800 its total white population was 5,641; however, its Native American population was estimated to be nearly 20,000, but may have been as high as 75,000.

Indiana Territory initially comprised most of the present-day state Indiana excluding a narrow strip of land along the eastern border called "The Gore" (ceded by Ohio in 1803), all of the present-day states of Illinois and Wisconsin, and parts of present-day Michigan and Minnesota. The Indiana Territory's boundary was further reduced in 1805 with the creation of the Michigan Territory to the north and again in 1809 when the Illinois Territory was established to the west.

=== Territorial government ===
When the Indiana Territory was established in 1800, President John Adams appointed William Henry Harrison as the first governor of the territory. John Gibson, who was appointed the territorial secretary, served as acting governor from July 4, 1800, until Harrison's arrival at Vincennes on January 10, 1801. When Harrison resigned his position, effective December 28, 1812, Gibson served as territorial governor until Thomas Posey was appointed on March 3, 1813. Posey left office on November 7, 1816, when Jonathan Jennings was sworn into office as the first governor of the state of Indiana. (Note: Harrison gained national fame as a hero of the Battle of Tippecanoe (1811) and become the ninth U.S. president (1841). In addition, Harrison County was named in his honor. See "Indiana History Chapter Two". Northern Indiana Center for History. Archived from the original on May 12, 2008.)

The first territorial capital was established at Vincennes, where it remained from 1800 to 1813, when territorial officials relocated the seat of government to Corydon. After the Illinois Territory was formed in 1809, Indiana's territorial legislature became fearful that the outbreak of war on the frontier could cause an attack on Vincennes, located on the western border of the territory, and made plans to move the capital closer to the territory's population center. Governor Harrison also favored Corydon, a town that he had established in 1808 and where he was also a landowner. Construction on the new capitol building began in 1814 and was nearly finished by 1816, when Indiana became a state.

The Northwest Ordinance of 1787 made no provision for a popularly elected territorial government in the first or non-representative phase of territorial government (1800 to 1804). Acting as the combined judicial and legislative government, a territorial governor and a General Court, which consisted of a three-member panel of judges, were appointed by the U.S. Congress, and later, the president with congressional approval. (The president subsequently delegated his authority to appoint these judges to the territorial governor.) When the territory entered the second or semi-legislative phase of government in 1805, its voters were allowed to elect representatives to the House of Representatives (lower house) of its bicameral legislature. President Jefferson delegated the task of choosing a five-member Legislative Council (upper house) to the territorial governor, who chose the members from a list of ten candidates provided by the lower house. The newly elected territorial legislature met for the first time on July 29, 1805, and gradually became the dominant branch, while the judges continued to focus on judicial matters. Governor Harrison retained veto powers, as well as his general executive and appointment authority. The legislative assembly had the authority to pass laws, subject to the governor's approval before they could be enacted.

As the population of the territory grew, so did the people's interest in exercising of their freedoms. In 1809, after the Indiana Territory was divided to create the Illinois Territory, Congress further altered the makeup of the territorial legislature. Voters in the Indiana Territory would continue to elect members to its House of Representatives; however, they were also granted permission for the first time to elect members to its Legislative Council (upper house).

=== Political issues ===
The major political issue in Indiana's territorial history was slavery; however, there were others, including Indian affairs, the formation of northern and western territories from portions of the Indiana Territory, concerns about the lack of territorial self-government and representation in Congress, and ongoing criticisms of Harrison's actions at territorial governor. Most of these issues were resolved before Indiana achieved statehood, including the debate over the issue of allowing slavery in the territory, which was settled in 1810; however, criticism of Governor Harrison continued.

In December 1802, delegates from Indiana Territory's four counties passed a resolution in favor of a ten-year suspension of Article 6 of the Northwest Ordinance of 1787. The ordinance prohibited slavery in the original Northwest Territory, although it had existed in the region since French rule. The resolution was made to legalize slavery in the territory and to make the region more appealing to slave-holding settlers from the Upper South who occupied areas along the Ohio River and wanted to bring their slaves into the territory. However, Congress failed to take action on the resolution, leaving Harrison and the territorial judges to pursue other options.

In 1809 Harrison found himself at odds with the new legislature when the anti-slavery party won a strong majority in the 1809 elections. In 1810 the territorial legislature repealed the indenturing and pro-slavery laws Harrison and the judicial council had enacted in 1803. Slavery remained the defining issue in the state for the decades to follow.

=== War of 1812 ===
The first major event in the territory's history was the resumption of hostilities with Native Americans. Unhappy with their treatment since the peace treaty of 1795, native tribes led by the Shawnee Chief Tecumseh and his brother Tenskwatawa formed a coalition against the Americans. Tecumseh's War started in 1811, when General Harrison led an army to rebuff the aggressive movements of Tecumseh's pan-Indian confederation. The Battle of Tippecanoe (1811), which caused a setback for the Native Americans, earned Harrison national fame and the nickname of "Old Tippecanoe".

The war between Tecumseh and Harrison merged with the War of 1812 after the remnants of the pan-Indian confederation allied with the British in Canada. The siege of Fort Harrison is considered to be the Americans' first land victory in the war. Other battles that occurred within the boundaries of the present-day state of Indiana include the siege of Fort Wayne, the Pigeon Roost Massacre and the Battle of the Mississinewa. The Treaty of Ghent (1814) ended the war and relieved American settlers from their fears of attack by the nearby British and their Indian allies. This treaty marked the end of hostilities with the Native Americans in Indiana. During the 19th century, Native Americans were victorious in 43 of the 58 recorded incidents between Native Americans and white settlers in Indiana. In the 37 battles between Native American warriors and U.S. Army troops, victories were nearly evenly split between the two parties. Despite the Native American victories, most of the native population was eventually removed from Indiana, a process that continued after the territory attained statehood.

== Early statehood ==
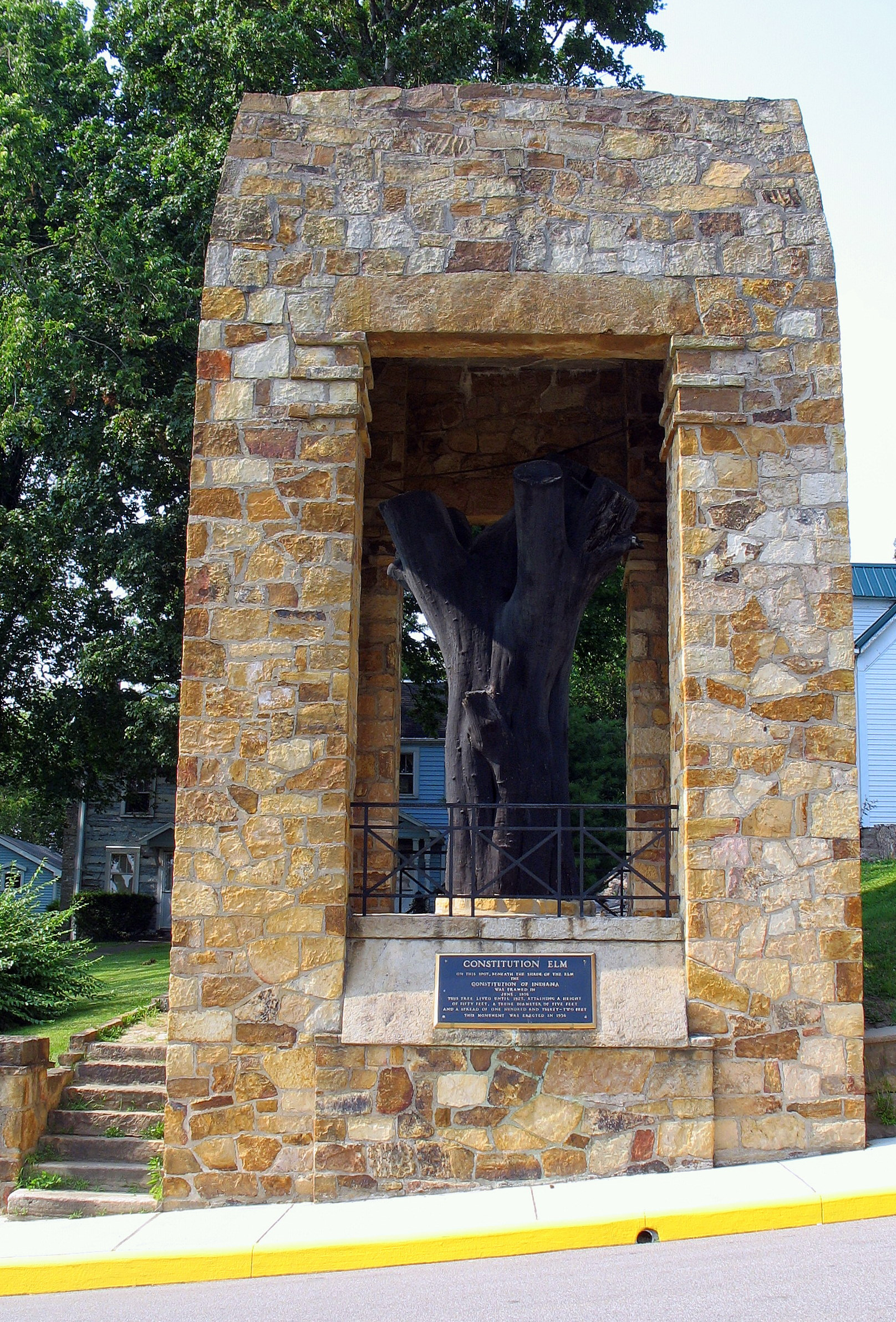
The Constitution Elm in Corydon

In 1812, Jonathan Jennings defeated Harrison's chosen candidate and became the territory's representative to Congress. Jennings immediately introduced legislation to grant Indiana statehood, even though the population of the entire territory was under 25,000, but no action was taken on the legislation because of the outbreak of the War of 1812.

Posey had created a rift in the politics of the territory by supporting slavery, much to the chagrin of opponents like Jennings, Dennis Pennington, and others who dominated the Territorial Legislature and who sought to use the bid for statehood to permanently end slavery in the territory.

=== Founding ===
In early 1816, the Territory approved a census and Pennington was named to be the census enumerator. The population of the territory was found to be 63,897, above the cutoff required for statehood. A constitutional convention met on June 10, 1816, in Corydon. Because of the heat of the season, the delegation moved outdoors on many days and wrote the constitution beneath the shade of a giant elm tree. The state's first constitution was completed on June 29, and elections were held in August to fill the offices of the new state government. In November, Congress approved statehood.

Jennings and his supporters had control of the convention and Jennings was elected its president. Other notable delegates at the convention included Dennis Pennington, Davis Floyd, and William Hendricks. Pennington and Jennings were at the forefront of the effort to prevent slavery from entering Indiana and sought to create a constitutional ban on it. Pennington was quoted as saying "Let us be on our guard when our convention men are chosen that they be men opposed to slavery". They succeeded in their goal and a ban was placed in the new constitution. But, persons already held in bondage stayed in that status for some time. That same year Indiana statehood was approved by Congress. And, while the Indiana constitution banned slavery in the state, Indiana and its white residents also excluded free Black citizens, and established barriers to their immigration to the state.

Jonathan Jennings, whose motto was "No slavery in Indiana", was elected governor of the state, defeating Thomas Posey 5,211 to 3,934 votes. Jennings served two terms as governor and then went on to represent the state in congress for another 18 years. Upon election, Jennings declared Indiana a free state. The abolitionists won a key victory in the 1820 Indiana Supreme Court case of Polly v. Lasselle, which stated that even those enslaved before Indiana statehood were now free. In the case of Mary Clark, an African American woman born into slavery and then indentured as a servant in Vincennes, Indiana, the Indiana Supreme Court in 1821 decided that indentured servitude was merely a ruse for slavery and was therefore prohibited. All forms of slavery in Indiana were finally banned by 1830.

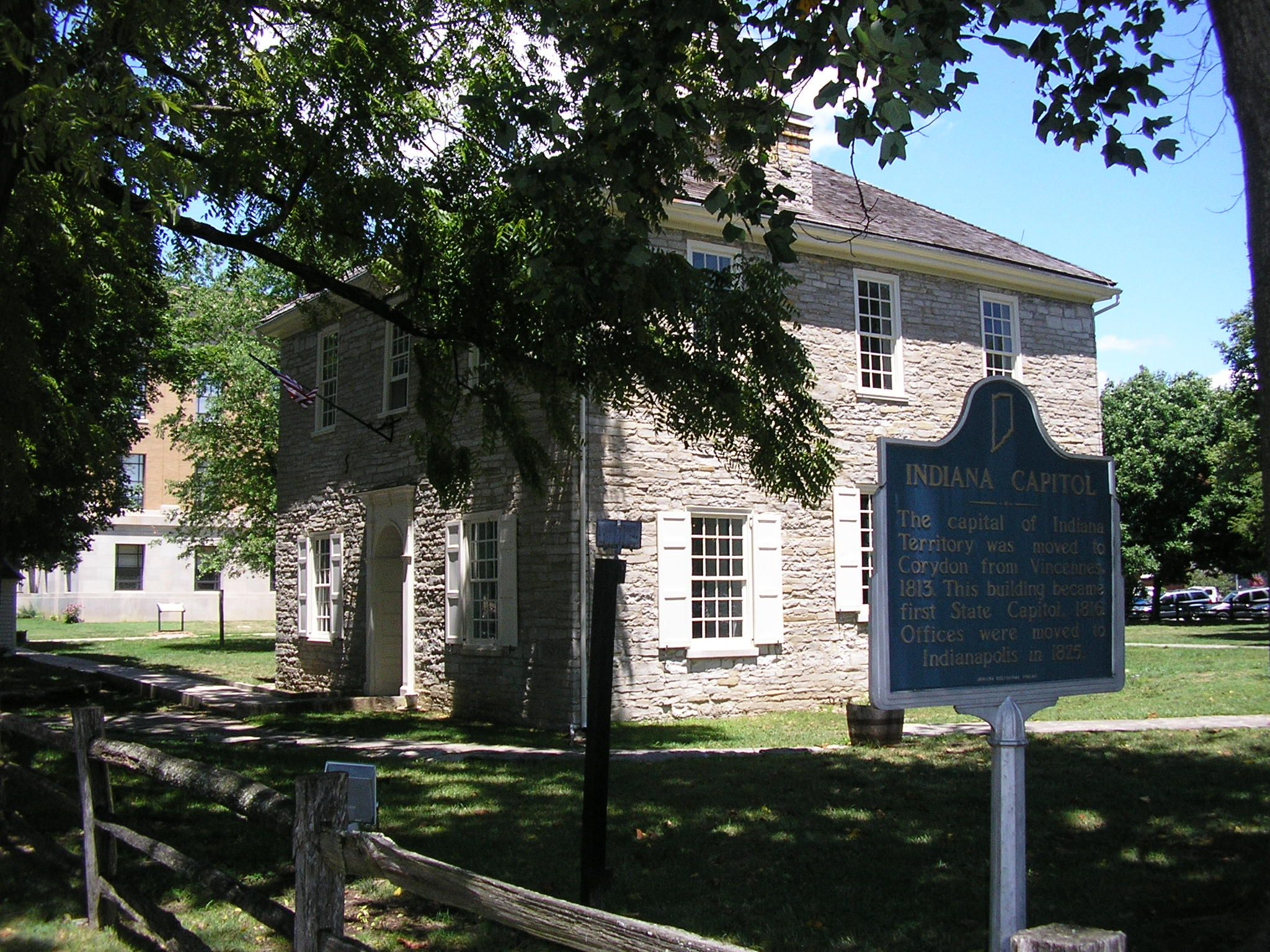
Indiana's First State Capitol Building

As the northern tribal lands gradually opened to white settlement, Indiana's population rapidly increased and the center of population shifted continually northward. One of the most significant post-frontier events in Indiana occurred in 1818 with the signing of the Treaty of St. Mary's at St. Mary's, Ohio to acquire Indian lands south of the Wabash from the Delaware and others. The area comprised about 1/3 of the present day area of Indiana, the central portion, and was called the "New Purchase". Eventually, 35 new counties were carved out of the New Purchase. An area like a large bite in the middle of the northern boundary was reserved to the Miami, called the Big Miami Reserve, which was the largest Indian reservation ever to exist in Indiana. Indianapolis was selected to be the site of the new state capital in 1820 because of its central position within the state and assumed good water transportation. However the founders were disappointed to discover the White River was too sandy for navigation. In 1825, Indianapolis replaced Corydon as the seat of government. The government became established in the Marion County Courthouse as the second state capital building.

=== Early development ===
Historical population
Census	Pop.	Note	%±
1800	2,632		—
1810	24,520		831.6%
1820	147,178		500.2%
1830	343,031		133.1%
1840	685,866		99.9%
1850	988,416		44.1%
1860	1,350,428		36.6%

The National Road reached Indianapolis in 1829, connecting Indiana to the Eastern United States. In the early 1830s citizens of Indiana began to be known as Hoosiers, although the origin of the word has been subject considerable debate, and the state took on the motto of "Crossroads of America". In 1832, construction began on the Wabash and Erie Canal, a project connecting the waterways of the Great Lakes to the Ohio River. Railroads soon made the canal system obsolete. These developments in transportation served to economically connect Indiana to the Northern East Coast, rather than relying solely on the natural waterways which connected Indiana to the Mississippi River and Gulf Coast states. (Note: The map shown on Nevins, p. 209, indicates that no railroad crossed the Mississippi or Ohio Rivers in 1859.)

In 1831, construction on the third state capitol building began. This building, designed by the firm of Ithiel Town and Alexander Jackson Davis, had a design inspired by the Greek Parthenon and opened in 1841. It was the first statehouse that was built and used exclusively by the state government.

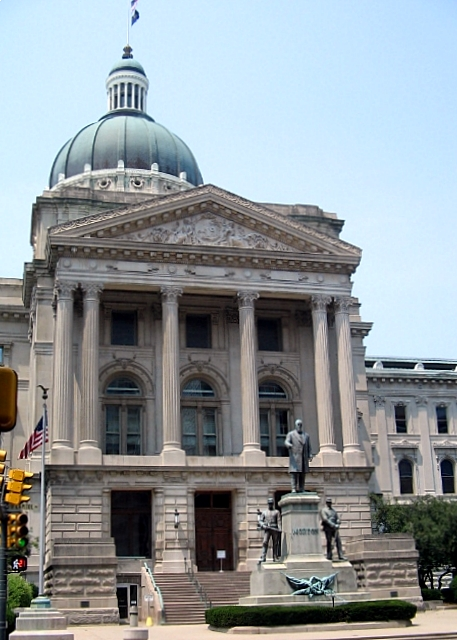
The fifth Indiana Statehouse in Indianapolis built in 1888 on the site of the third statehouse

The state suffered from financial difficulties during its first three decades. Jonathan Jennings attempted to begin a period of internal improvements. Among his projects, the Indiana Canal Company was reestablished to build a canal around the Falls of the Ohio. The Panic of 1819 caused the state's only two banks to fold. This hurt Indiana's credit, halted the projects, and hampered the start of new projects until the 1830s, after the repair of the state's finances during the terms of William Hendricks and Noah Noble. Beginning in 1831, large scale plans for statewide improvements were set into motion. Overspending on the internal improvements led to a large deficit that had to be funded by state bonds through the newly created Bank of Indiana and sale of over nine million acres (36,000 km^{2}) of public land. By 1841, the debt had become unmanageable. Having borrowed over $13 million, the equivalent to the state's first fifteen years of tax revenue, the government could not even pay interest on the debt. The state narrowly avoided bankruptcy by negotiating the liquidation of the public works, transferring them to the state's creditors in exchange for a 50 percent reduction in the state's debt. (Note: Three state-owned railroads, the Michigan Road, the Vincennes Trace, and all of the canals in Indiana, with the exception of the Wabash and Erie Canal, were transferred to creditors.) The internal improvements began under Jennings paid off as the state began to experience rapid population growth that slowly remedied the state's funding problems. The improvements led to a fourfold increase in land value, and an even larger increase in farm produce.

During the 1840s, Indiana completed the removal of the Native American tribes. The majority of the Potawatomi voluntarily relocated to Kansas in 1838. Those who did not leave were forced to travel to Kansas in what came to be called the Potawatomi Trail of Death, leaving only the Pokagon Band of Potawatomi Indians in the Indiana area. The majority of the Miami tribe left in 1846, although many members of the tribe were permitted to remain in the state on lands they held privately under the terms of the 1818 Treaty of St. Mary's. The other tribes were also convinced to leave the state voluntarily through the payment of subsidies and land grants further west. The Shawnee migrated westward to settle in Missouri, and the Lenape migrated into Canada. The other minor tribes in the state, including the Wea, moved westward, mostly to Kansas.

By the 1850s, Indiana had undergone major changes: what was once a frontier with sparse population had become a developing state with several cities. In 1816, Indiana's population was around 65,000, and in less than 50 years, it had increased to more than 1,000,000 inhabitants.

Because of the rapidly changing state, the constitution of 1816 began to be criticized. (Note: Indiana's Constitution of 1816 required a referendum be held every twelve years to approve its continued use.) Opponents claimed the constitution had too many appointed positions, the terms established were inadequate, and some of the clauses were too easily manipulated by the political parties that did not exist when then constitution was written. The first constitution had not been put to a vote by the general public, and following the great population growth in the state, it was seen as inadequate. A constitutional convention was called in January 1851 to create a new one. The new constitution was approved by the convention on February 10, 1851, and submitted for a vote to the electorate that year. It was approved and has since been the official constitution.

=== Black Hoosiers before the Civil War ===
Year	Slaves	Free Blacks
1800	28	87
1810	237	393
1820	192	1,230
1830	3	3,629
1840	3	7,165
1850	0	11,262

African Americans migrated to Indiana before its official statehood in 1816. The first recorded were five enslaved people in Vincennes, Indiana in 1746. In the 1820 federal census, 1,230 reported themselves as residents of Indiana. Most Black migrants to Indiana arrived from South Carolina, Ohio, Virginia, and Kentucky. African Americans pioneered rural settlements in the state throughout the first half of the nineteenth-century and accounted for 1.1% of the total population by 1850. Although Black Hoosiers settled in urban areas, many rural antebellum communities were found throughout the state, including Lyles Station, Roberts Settlement, and Beech Settlement.

Although Indiana entered the Union in 1816 as a free state, it gave only a tepid welcome to African Americans. Throughout the first half of the nineteenth century, Indiana attempted to keep Black Hoosiers from attending public school, voting, testifying in court, and endeavored to set other limits on African American citizenship and inclusion. Black individuals were denied the right to testify in court in 1818. In 1829, the Indiana Colonization Society was founded to help repatriate African Americans to Liberia which reflected a desire to rid the state of its Black residents. The 1830 census recorded three slaves in the state. The earliest days of the territory and of statehood witnessed intense debates over whether to allow slavery in Indiana. Laws in the 1830s sought to prevent free Black individuals from entering the state without certificates of freedom under threat of fines and expulsion. The Black Law of 1831 required Black citizens to register within their county and pay a $500 bond.

While the 1830 law was only sporadically enforced it reflected hostility towards African Americans and their settlement in the state. Throughout the early nineteenth century, Black Hoosiers struggled to enjoy basic civil rights in the state, including the right to educate their children. In 1837 and 1841, the state formally excluded African Americans from public education. In 1837, the state legislature moved to recognize "The white inhabitants of each congressional district" as the citizens qualified to vote in school board elections. Four years later, they followed with an effort to preclude Black households from school board assessments. This helped to establish Hoosier schools as de facto segregated white populations. Efforts in 1842 to formally exclude African American children from public education were rebuffed, however. The State Committee on Education responded to the matter acknowledging that Black students "Are here, unfortunately, for us and them, and we have duties to perform in reference to their well-being." While the state did not have legal segregation, Black children were also excluded public schools as a matter of custom.

Indiana passed laws against interracial marriage in 1818 and 1821. Under 1840 state laws to ban miscegenation, Indiana became the first state to make interracial marriage a felony. Article II of the new constitution of 1851 expanded suffrage for white males, but excluded Black Hoosiers from suffrage. Article XIII of the Indiana Constitution of 1851 sought to exclude African Americans from settling in the state, declaring "No negro or mulatto shall come into or settle in the State." This was the only provision of the new constitution submitted to a special election. Indiana constitutional convention delegates voted 93 to 40 in favor of the article. The popular vote was even more enthusiastic in its support for exclusion with a vote of 113,828 in favor and only 21,873 against excluding African Americans. This ban stood until 1866 when the Indiana Supreme Court ruled that it was unconstitutional.

Racial hostility and discrimination co-existed alongside abolition sentiments and efforts. Levi Coffin, unofficially known as "President of the Underground Railroad", and one of the most prominent abolitionists in the United States operated out of Richmond. The Underground Railroad in Indiana sought to help runaway slaves escape to northern states and Canada. White Quakers, Baptists, and others worked to secure safe passage for runaway slaves. Abolition efforts conflicted with a growing antipathy towards free Black Hoosiers in the state. A large influx occurred in 1814 when Paul and Susannah Mitchem immigrated to Indiana from Virginia with over 100 of their slaves. Later that year they emancipated all of their slaves, most of whom formed a large part of the population of the first state capital in Corydon.

Bounty hunters (slavecatchers), mostly operating in the southern part of the state, offered their services and knowledge of the area to southerners searching for runaways. In addition, free Black individuals could become victims when slavecatchers could not find runaway slaves. Bounty hunters and slavecatchers might seize free Black individuals, claiming them to be runaways, and bring them to the Southern United States to be sold into bondage. In one incident in the early 1850s, for example, slavecatchers seized two free Black citizens working on the Wabash and Erie Canal. Although local abolitionists quickly organized and petitioned the sheriff to release the two men, the slavecatchers had documents that described the men and claimed they were runaways. Evidence suggested the documents were false, but there was no way to refute the claim. The slavecatchers were allowed to take the two men as their prisoners, but before they left Indiana a group of abolitionists overtook the party and freed the two Black laborers.

==== Civil War, Exodusters, and the Great Migration ====
Article 13 of the 1851 Indiana Constitution was deemed 'unconstitutional' in 1866, but was not amended until 1881. Indiana's Black population increased after the Civil War mostly along the Ohio River, such as Spencer County, Indiana, which included 947 Black citizens by 1870.

As Reconstruction ended in the South, former enslaved peoples wanted to move north, which included the migration of Black people from North Carolina to Indiana. Black people who migrated from the South after the Civil War were known as Exodusters, who were in search of access to good schools, Black community-centered churches, and job opportunities. Many migrants during this time who arrived in Indiana were met with anti-Black violence and forced to relocate due to Indiana's numerous sundown towns. Black communities around Indianapolis tried to help those who had migrated, but many of the Exodusters became discouraged and went back to North Carolina. Those who stayed often settled in Indianapolis, contributing to the city's Black population growth.

The Black population in 1880 was 39,228 and by 1900 it was 57,960.

During the Great Migration, Black individuals who came to Indiana between 1910 and 1920, often settled in central or northern parts of the states. New opportunities were available due to industrialization and the war economy, and rumors of new opportunities were appealing.

=== Religion ===
Frontier Indiana was prime ground missionary for the Second Great Awakening, with a never-ending parade of camp meetings and revivals. Baptist church records show an intense interest in private moral behavior at the weekly meetings, including drinking and proper child-rearing practices. The most contentious issue was the antimission controversy, in which the more traditional elements denounced missionary societies as unbiblical. Daniel Parker, of Vincennes, was a key leader of the antimission movement

Eastern Presbyterian and Congregational denominations funded an aggressive missionary program, 1826–55, through the American Home Missionary Society (AHMS). It sought to bring sinners to Christ and also to modernize society promoted middle class values, mutual trust among the members, and tried to minimize violence and drinking. The frontierspeople were the reformees and they displayed their annoyance at the new morality being imposed on society. The political crisis came in 1854–55 over a pietistic campaign to enact "dry" prohibition of liquor sales. They were strongly opposed by the "wets", especially non-churched, the Catholics, Episcopalians, the antimissionary elements, and the German recent arrivals. Prohibition failed in 1855 and the moralistic pietistic Protestants switched to a new, equally moralistic cause, the anti-slavery crusade led by the new Republican Party.

In 1836 Black Hoosiers founded the Bethel AME Church in Indianapolis.

== Higher education ==
For a list of institutions, see Category:Universities and colleges in Indiana.

The earliest institutions of education in Indiana were missions, established by French Jesuit priests to convert local Native American nations. The Jefferson Academy was founded in 1801 as a public university for the Indiana Territory, and was reincorporated as Vincennes University in 1806, the first in the state.

The 1816 constitution required that Indiana's state legislature create a "general system of education, ascending in a regular gradation, from township schools to a state university, wherein tuition shall be gratis, and equally open to all". It took several years for the legislature to fulfill its promise, partly because of a debate about whether a new public university should be founded to replace the territorial university. The 1820s saw the start of free public township schools. During the administration of William Hendricks, a plot of ground was set aside in each township for the construction of a schoolhouse.

The state government chartered Indiana University in Bloomington in 1820 as the State Seminary. Construction began in 1822, the first professor was hired in 1823, and classes were offered in 1824.

Other state colleges were established for specialized needs. They included Indiana State University, established in Terre Haute in 1865 as the state normal school for training teachers. Purdue University was founded in 1869 as the state's land-grant university, a school of science and agriculture. Ball State University was founded as a normal school in the early 20th century and given to the state in 1918.

Public colleges lagged behind the private religious colleges in both size and educational standards until the 1890s. In 1855, North Western Christian University [now Butler University] was chartered by Ovid Butler after a split with the Christian Church Disciples of Christ over slavery. Significantly the university was founded on the basis of anti-slavery and co-education. It was one of the first to admit African Americans and one of the first to have a named chair for female professors, the Demia Butler Chair in English. Asbury College (now Depauw University) was Methodist. Wabash College was Presbyterian; they led the Protestant schools. The University of Notre Dame, founded by Rev Edward Sorin in 1842, proclaims itself as a prominent Catholic college. Indiana lagged the rest of the Midwest with the lowest literacy and education rates into the early 20th century.

== Transportation ==
In the early 19th century, most transportation of goods in Indiana was done by river. Most of the state's estuaries drained into the Wabash River or the Ohio River, ultimately meeting up with the Mississippi River, where goods were transported to and sold in St. Louis or New Orleans.

The first road in the region was the Buffalo Trace, an old bison trail that ran from the Falls of the Ohio to Vincennes. After the capitol was relocated to Corydon, several local roads were created to connect the new capitol to the Ohio River at Mauckport and to New Albany. The first major road in the state was the National Road, a project funded by the federal government. The road entered Indiana in 1829, connecting Richmond, Indianapolis, and Terre Haute with the eastern states and eventually Illinois and Missouri in the west. The state adopted the advanced methods used to build the national road on a statewide basis and began to build a new road network that was usable year-round. The north–south Michigan Road was built in the 1830s, connecting Michigan and Kentucky and passing through Indianapolis in the middle. These two new roads were roughly perpendicular within the state and served as the foundation for a road system to encompass all of Indiana.

Indiana was flat enough with plenty or rivers to spend heavily on a canal mania in the 1830s. Planning in the lightly populated state began in 1827 as New York had scored a major success with its Erie Canal. In 1836 the legislature allocated $10 million for an elaborate network of internal improvements, promoting canals, turnpikes, and railroads. The goal was to encourage settlement by providing easy, cheap access to the remotest corners of the state, linking every area to the Great Lakes and Ohio River, and thence to the Atlantic seaports and New Orleans. Every region joined in enthusiastically, but the scheme was a financial disaster because the legislature required that work must begin on all parts of all the projects simultaneously; very few were finished. The state was unable to pay the bonds it issued and was blackballed in Eastern and European financial circles for decades.

The first major railroad line was completed in 1847, connecting Madison with Indianapolis. By the 1850s, the railroad began to become popular in Indiana. Indianapolis as the focal point, Indiana had 212 miles of railroad in operation in 1852, soaring to 1,278 miles in 1854. They were operated by 18 companies; construction plans were underway to double the totals. The successful railroad network brought major changes to Indiana and enhanced the state's economic growth. Although Indiana's natural waterways connected it to the South via cities such as St. Louis and New Orleans, the new rail lines ran east–west, and connected Indiana with the economies of the northern states. As late as mid-1859, no rail line yet bridged the Ohio or Mississippi rivers. Because of an increased demand on the state's resources and the embargo against the Confederacy, the rail system was mostly completed by 1865.

== Early nineteenth century social reforms ==
=== Temperance movement ===
Temperance became a part of the evangelical Protestant initiative during Indiana's pioneer era and early statehood. Many Hoosiers freely indulged in drinking locally distilled whiskey on a daily basis, with binges on election days and holidays, and during community celebrations Reformers announced that the devil was at work and must be repudiated. A state temperance society formed in 1829 and local temperance societies soon organized in Indianapolis, Fort Wayne, and Logansport. By the 1830s pietistic (evangelical) Protestants and community leaders had joined forces to curb consumption of alcohol. In 1847, the Indiana General Assembly passed a local option bill that allowed a vote on whether to prohibit alcohol sales in a township.

By the 1850s Indiana's Republican party, whose adherents tended to favor the temperance movement, began challenging the state's Democrats, who supported personal freedom and a limited federal government, for political power. Early temperance legislation in Indiana earned only limited and temporary success. In 1853, Republicans persuaded the state legislature to pass a local option law that allowed a township voter to declare it dry, but it was later deemed unconstitutional. In 1855, a statewide prohibition law was passed, but it met the same fate as the local option. In the decades to come Protestant churches, especially the Methodists, Baptists, Presbyterians, Disciples of Christ, Quakers, and women's groups continued to support temperance efforts and gave strong support to the mostly dry Republican Party. The Catholics, Episcopalians and Lutherans stood opposed and gave strong support to the wet Democratic Party.

=== Abolition ===
Abolition in Indiana reflected a mix of anti-Black sentiment, religiously oriented social reforms, and pro-Black sentiments. Several groups and notable individuals stood in opposition to slavery and in support of African Americans in the state. The North Western Christian University [later Butler University] was founded by Ovid Butler in 1855 after a schism with the Christian Church (Disciples of Christ) over slavery.

=== Women's suffrage movement ===
Indiana has a long history of women's activism in social movements including the women's suffrage movement.

The Indiana Woman's Suffrage Association was founded in 1851 by important suffrage leaders such as Agnes Cook, Mary B. Birdsall, Amanda M. Way, and Mary F. Thomas. With the exception of Way, all these women were the first to address the Indiana State Legislature on January 19, 1859, with petitions calling for women's suffrage, temperance, and equal rights. In 1854, Birdsall had purchased The Lily, the first U.S. newspaper edited by and for women, from its founder, Amelia Bloomer, and moved it to Richmond, Indiana. The newspaper had begun as a temperance newspaper but was later used to campaign for women's suffrage and rights.

== Civil War ==
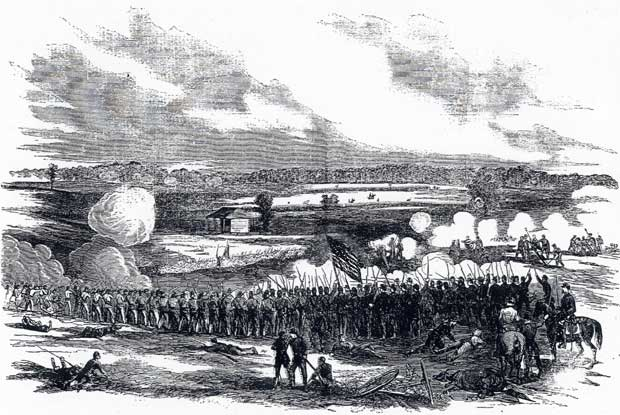
80th Indiana Infantry Regiment and the 19th Indiana Light Artillery defending against the Confederates at the Battle of Perryville by H. Mosler

Indiana, a free state and the boyhood home of Abraham Lincoln, remained a member of the Union during the American Civil War. Indiana regiments were involved in all the major engagements of the war and almost all the engagements in the western theater. Hoosiers were present in the first and last battles of the war. During the war, Indiana provided 126 infantry regiments, 26 batteries of artillery, and 13 regiments of cavalry to the cause of the Union.

In the initial call to arms issued in 1861, Indiana was assigned a quota of 7,500 men—a tenth of the amount called—to join the Union Army in putting down the rebellion. So many volunteered in the first call that thousands had to be turned away. Before the war ended, Indiana contributed 208,367 men to fight and serve in the war. Casualties were over 35% among these men: 24,416 lost their lives in the conflict and over 50,000 more were wounded.

At the outbreak of the war, Indiana was run by a Democratic and southern sympathetic majority in the state legislature. It was by the actions of Governor Oliver Morton, who illegally borrowed millions of dollars to finance the army, that Indiana could contribute so greatly to the war effort. Morton suppressed the state legislature with the help of the Republican minority to prevent it from assembling during 1861 and 1862. This prevented any chance the Democrats might have had to interfere with the war effort or to attempt to secede from the Union.

=== Sanitary Commission ===
In March 1862, Governor Oliver Morton also assembled a committee known as the Indiana Sanitary Commission to raise funds and gather supplies for troops in the field. It was not until January 1863 that the commission began recruiting women as nurses for wounded soldiers. Notable women members of the included Mary F. Thomas, a Hoosier suffragist, and Eliza Hamilton-George, also known as "Mother George". Although the exact number of women volunteers is unknown, William Hannaman, president of the Indiana Sanitary Commission, reported to Morton in 1866 that "about two hundred and fifty" women had volunteered as nurses between 1863 and 1865.

=== Raids ===
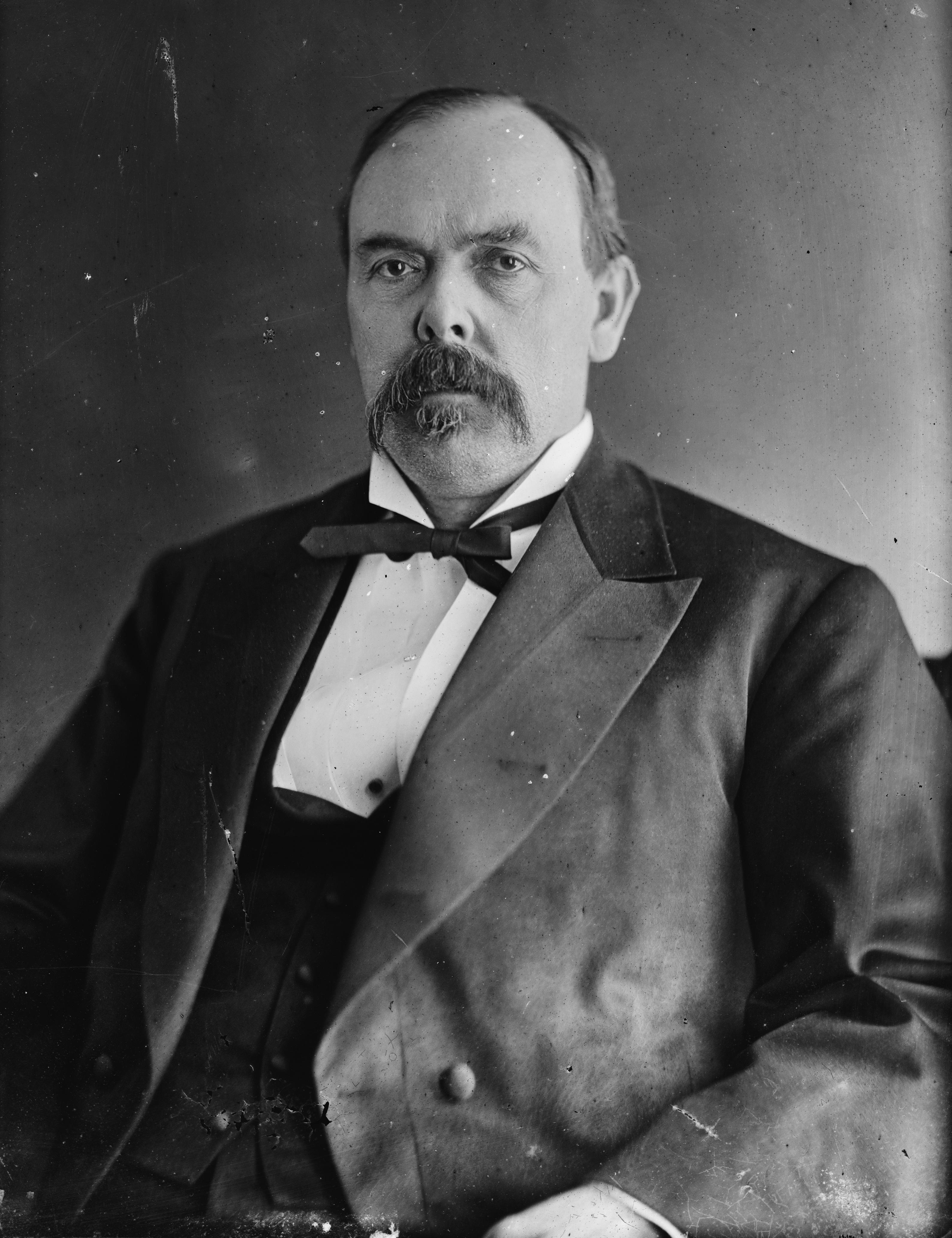
Oliver Hazard Perry Morton, governor 1861 to 1867

Two raids on Indiana soil during the war caused a brief panic in Indianapolis and southern Indiana. The Newburgh Raid on July 18, 1862, occurred when Confederate officer Adam Johnson briefly captured Newburgh by convincing the Union troops garrisoning the town that he had cannon on the surrounding hills, when in fact they were merely camouflaged stovepipes. The raid convinced the federal government that it was necessary to supply Indiana with a permanent force of regular Union Army soldiers to counter future raids.

The most significant Civil War battle fought in Indiana was a small skirmish during Morgan's Raid. On the morning of July 9, 1863, Morgan attempted to cross the Ohio River into Indiana with his force of 2,400 Confederate cavalry. After his crossing was briefly contested, he marched north to Corydon where he fought the Indiana Legion in the short Battle of Corydon. Morgan took command of the heights south of Corydon and shot two shells from his batteries into the town, which promptly surrendered. The battle left 15 dead and 40 wounded. Morgan's main body of troopers briefly raided New Salisbury, Crandall, Palmyra, and Salem. Fear gripped the capitol, and the militia began to form there to contest Morgan's advance. After Salem, however, Morgan turned east, raiding and skirmishing along this path and leaving Indiana through West Harrison on July 13 into Ohio, where he was captured.

=== Aftermath ===
The Civil War had a major effect on the development of Indiana. Before the war, the population was generally in the south of the state, where many had entered via the Ohio River, which provided a cheap and convenient means to export products and agriculture to New Orleans to be sold. The war closed the Mississippi River to traffic for nearly four years, forcing Indiana to find other means to export its produce. This led to a population shift to the north where the state came to rely more on the Great Lakes and the railroad for exports.

Before the war, New Albany was the largest city in the state, mainly because of its river contacts and extensive trade with the South. Over half of Hoosiers with over $100,000 lived in New Albany. During the war, the trade with the South came to a halt, and many residents considered those of New Albany as too friendly to the South. The city never regained its stature. It was stilled as a city of 40,000 with its early Victorian Mansion-Row buildings remaining from the boom period.

== Post-Civil War era ==
=== Economic growth ===
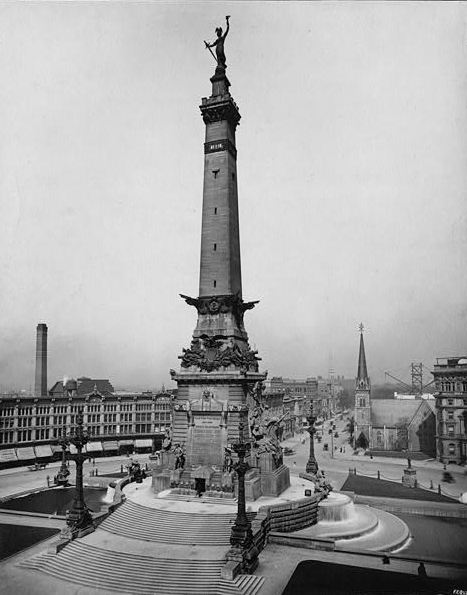
The Circle in Indianapolis, circa 1898

Historical population
Census	Pop.	Note	%±
1870	1,680,637		—
1880	1,978,301		17.7%
1890	2,192,404		10.8%
1900	2,516,462		14.8%
1910	2,700,876		7.3%
1920	2,930,390		8.5%
1930	3,238,503		10.5%

Ohio River ports had been stifled by an embargo on the Confederate South and never fully recovered their economic prominence, leading the south into an economic decline. By contrast, northern Indiana experienced an economic boom when natural gas was discovered in the 1880s, which directly contributed to the rapid growth of cities such as Gas City, Hartford City, and Muncie where a glass industry developed to use the cheap fuel. The Indiana gas field was then the largest known in the world. The boom lasted until the early 20th century, when the gas supplies ran low. This began northern Indiana's industrialization.

The development of heavy industry attracted thousands of European immigrants in the late 19th and early 20th centuries, as well as internal migrants, both Black and white, from the rural and small town South. These developments dramatically altered the demographics of the state. Indiana industrial cities were among the destinations of the Great Migration. After World War II, industrial restructuring and the shifts in heavy industry resulted in Indiana's becoming part of the Rust Belt.

In 1876, chemist Eli Lilly, a Union colonel during the Civil War, founded Eli Lilly and Company, a pharmaceutical company. His initial innovation of gelatin-coating for pills led to a rapid growth of the company that eventually developed as Indiana's largest corporation, and one of the largest corporations in the world. (Note: According to Forbes, Eli Lilly and Company was the 229th largest company in the world in 2007.) Over the years, the corporation developed many widely used drugs, including insulin, and it became the first company to mass-produce penicillin. The company's many advances made Indiana the leading state in the production and development of medicines.

Charles Conn returned to Elkhart after the Civil War and established C.G. Conn Ltd., a manufacturer of musical instruments. The company's innovation in band instruments made Elkhart an important center of the music world, and it became a base of Elkhart's economy for decades. Nearby South Bend experienced continued growth following the Civil War, and became a large manufacturing city centered around the Oliver Farm Equipment Company, the nation's leading plow producer. Gary was founded in 1906 by the United States Steel Corporation as the home for its new plant.

The administration of Governor James D. Williams proposed the construction of the fourth state capitol building in 1878. The third state capitol building was razed and the new one was constructed on the same site. Two million dollars was appropriated for construction and the new building was completed in 1888. The building was still in use in 2008.

The Panic of 1893 had a severely negative effect on the Hoosier economy when many factories closed and several railroads declared bankruptcy. The Pullman Strike of 1894 hurt the Chicago area and coal miners in southern Indiana participated in a national strike. Hard times were not limited to industry; farmers also felt a financial pinch from falling prices. The economy began to recover when World War I broke out in Europe, creating a higher demand for American goods. Despite economic setbacks, advances in industrial technology continued throughout the last years of the 19th and into the 20th century. On July 4, 1894, Elwood Haynes successfully road tested his first automobile, and opened the Haynes-Apperson auto company in 1896. In 1895, William Johnson invented a process for casting aluminum.

=== Political battleground ===
During the postwar era, Indiana became a critical swing state that often helped decide which party controlled the presidency. Elections were very close, and became the center of frenzied attention with many parades, speeches and rallies as election day approached; voter turnout ranging over 90% to near 100% in such elections as 1888 and 1896. In remote areas, both sides paid their supporters to vote, and occasionally paid supporters of the opposition not to vote. Despite allegations, historians have found very little fraud in national elections.

To win the electoral vote, both national parties looked for Indiana candidates for the national tickets; a Hoosier was included in all but one presidential election between 1880 and 1924.

In 1888, Indiana Senator Benjamin Harrison, grandson of territorial Governor William Henry Harrison, was elected president after an intense battle that attracted more than 300,000 partisans to Indianapolis to hear him speak from his famous front porch. Fort Benjamin Harrison was named in his honor. Six Hoosiers have been elected as vice-president. The most recent was Mike Pence, elected in 2016.

=== Black Hoosiers after the Civil War ===
Due to rising white supremacist laws and culture in the southern United States, many Black Americans migrated north. Between November 1878 and February 1879 more than 1100 Black people arrived in Indianapolis, with many more settling across the state. By the end of the century, Indiana's Black resident population numbered 57,505.

Article XIII of the Indiana Constitution of 1851, which sought to exclude African Americans from settling in the state, was invalidated when the Indiana Supreme Court ruled in 1866 that it violated the newly passed Thirteenth Amendment to the U.S. Constitution. Nevertheless, numerous communities and counties implemented practices to exclude African Americans. These jurisdictions, known as "sundown towns", were prevalent during the 1890s. Sundown towns sought to maintain an all-white population by intentionally expelling Black residents and preventing African American settlement. As a result of sundown policies, the number of counties that had African American residents dropped significantly between 1890 and 1930. By the 1990s, sundown town policies became less common in Indiana.

Black Hoosiers were selectively allowed to hold leadership roles at the state level. James Sidney Hinton was the first Black person to serve as a legislator in the Indiana General Assembly in 1880. Lillian Thomas Fox was the first Black woman to write for the Indianapolis News, a historically white newspaper.

Indiana housed the Senate Avenue YMCA, one of the largest African American YMCA's in the United States. Through activities hosted by the Senate Avenue YMCA, Indianapolis became an influential cultural center for African Americans.

=== High culture ===
The last decades of the 19th century began what is known as the "golden age of Indiana literature", a period that lasted until the 1920s. Edward Eggleston wrote The Hoosier Schoolmaster (1871), the first best seller to originate in the state. Many other followed, including Maurice Thompson's Hoosier Mosaics (1875), and Lew Wallace's Ben-Hur (1880). Indiana developed a reputation as the "American heartland" following several widely read novels beginning with Booth Tarkington's The Gentleman from Indiana (1899), Meredith Nicholson's The Hoosiers (1900), and Thompson's second famous novel, Alice of Old Vincennes (1900). James Whitcomb Riley, known as the "Hoosier Poet" and the most popular poet of his age, wrote hundreds of poems celebrating Hoosier themes, including Little Orphant Annie. A unique art culture also began developing in the late 19th century, beginning the Hoosier School of landscape painting and the Richmond Group of impressionist painters. The painters were known for their use of vivid colors and artists including T. C. Steele, whose work was influenced by the colorful hills of southern Indiana. Prominent musicians and composers from Indiana also reached national acclaim during the time, including Paul Dresser whose most popular song, "On the Banks of the Wabash, Far Away", was later adopted as the official state song.

=== Prohibition and women's suffrage ===
By the late nineteenth and early twentieth century, prohibition and women's suffrage had become the major reform issues in the state. Although supporters and their opponents closely linked the two movements, temperance received a broader hearing than the efforts toward equal suffrage. While many Protestant churches in Indiana supported temperance, few provided a forum for discussions on women's voting rights.

The drive for women's suffrage was reinvigorated in the 1870s, and was sponsored by the leaders of the prohibition movement, especially the Woman's Christian Temperance Union (WCTU). The Indiana branch of the American Woman Suffrage Association was re-established in 1869. In 1878, May Wright Sewall founded the Indianapolis Equal Suffrage Society, which fought for world peace before the nation plunged into World War I. Several Indiana women also became temperance leaders and took an active role in the movement. The Indiana chapter of the WCTU was formed in 1874 with Zerelda G. Wallace as its first president. Like many other suffrage leaders, Wallace was radicalized for woman's suffrage through her temperance reform work. During her 1875 speech before the Indiana General Assembly in support of prohibition, legislators demonstrated an open contempt for women involved in politics and speaking in public. Afterward, Wallace credited the experience with her embrace of suffrage.

The first major effort to give women the right to vote in all non-federal elections attempted to amend the state constitution. It passed by both houses of the state legislature in 1881; however, the bill failed to pass in the next legislative session in 1883 as state law required. Temperance efforts fared little better. In 1881, the Indiana chapter of the WCTU, along with organizations participating in the Indiana Grand Council of Temperance, successfully lobbied the Indiana General Assembly to pass an amendment to the state constitution to prohibit the manufacture and sale of alcoholic beverages in the state, but the Indiana Liquor League and a Democratic majority in the state legislature killed the bill in the legislative session in 1883. Following these legislative defeats women's suffrage and prohibition became sensitive issues in local politics as the Democrats rallied the opposition. In German strongholds such as Fort Wayne, opposition to prohibition and women's suffrage was strong until World War I. As one historian notes, "within German working-class family traditions, women in particular were sharply defined in terms of family responsibilities. Suffrage and women's rights ran counter to deep social and religious traditions that placed women in a subservient relationship to men." Renewed interest in women's suffrage did not occur until the end of the century, while prohibition crusaders continued to press for legislative action.

To gain political power in favor of prohibition legislation, a state Prohibition Party was formed in 1884; however, it was never able to effectively mobilize a significant force of voters within the state. Many temperance advocates continued to work within the more established political parties. The liquor issue pitted wets and drys in stable uncompromising coalitions that formed a main theme of Hoosier politics into the 1930s. One legislative success occurred in 1895, when the state legislature passed the Nicholson law, a local option law authored by S. E. Nicholson, a Quaker minister who served in the state legislature and was a leader of the national Anti-Saloon League. The League became a political powerhouse, mobilizing pietistic Protestant voters (that is, members of the major denominations except Lutherans and Episcopalians) to support dry legislation. The Nicholson law allowed voters in a city or township to file a remonstrance that would prevent an individual saloon owner from acquiring a liquor license. Additional legislative efforts to extend the Nicholson law and achieve statewide prohibition in Indiana would not occur until the early twentieth century. One of the leading supporters for the temperance movement in Indiana was Emma Barrett Molloy, who was an active member of the WCTU and lectured across the country to promote the ban of alcohol. Through her vocal activism in temperance and prohibition, Molloy also entered into the women's suffrage sphere as a strong supported for women's rights, particularly freedom of speech.

In May 1906, in Kokomo, a meeting was called to try to revive the defunct Indiana suffragist movement. An Indiana Auxiliary of the National American Woman Suffrage Association was formed and officers were elected. The officers included: Sarah Davis, President; Laura Schofield, first vice-president; Anna Dunn Noland, second vice-president; Mrs. E. M. Wood, secretary; Marion Harvie Barnard, treasurer; and Jane Pond and Judge Samuel Artman, auditors.

In 1911, a suffrage group was formed after the Indianapolis Franchise Society and the Legislation Council of Indiana Women merged to form the Woman's Franchise League of Indiana (WFL). The WFL was a member of the national suffrage organization, the National American Woman Suffrage Association. The league was influential in obtaining the vote for women at the state level and formed 1,205 memberships in thirteen districts. After the Nineteenth Amendment to the United States Constitution was adopted, the Woman's Franchise League of Indiana organized the League of Women Voters of Indiana.

=== High profile crime ===
Hoosiers were fascinated with crime and criminals. Some historians have argued that the popularity of bandits and their exploits in robbing banks and getting away with murder derived from working class resentment against the excesses of the Gilded Age. A group of brothers from Seymour, who had served in the Civil War, formed the Reno Gang, the first outlaw gang in the United States. The Reno Gang, named for the brothers, terrorized Indiana and the region for several years. They were responsible for the first train robbery in the United States which occurred near Seymour in 1866. Their actions inspired a host of other outlaw gangs who copied their work, beginning several decades of high-profile train robberies. Pursued by detectives from the Pinkerton Detective Agency, most of the gang was captured in 1868 and lynched by vigilantes. Other notorious Hoosiers also flourished in the post-war years, including Belle Gunness, an infamous "black widow" serial killer. She killed more than twenty people, most of them men, between 1881 and her own murder in 1908.

In response to the Reno Gang and other criminals, several white cap groups began operating in the state, primarily in the southern counties. They began carrying out lynchings against suspected criminals, leading the state to attempt to crack down on their practices. By the turn of the 20th century, they had become so notorious that anti-lynching laws were passed and in one incident the governor called out the militia to protect a prisoner. When the white caps showed up to lynch him, the militia opened fire, killing one and wounding eleven. Vigilante activity decreased following the incident, and remained low until the rise of the Ku Klux Klan in the 1920s.

Crime stories grabbed the headlines in the 1920s and 1930s. After Prohibition took effect in 1920 until its demise in 1933, it opened up a financial bonanza for criminal activity, especially underground bootlegging and the smuggling of liquor into Chicago, Gary, South Bend, Fort Wayne, Indianapolis, Evansville and other thirsty cities. Enforcement was haphazard; the Anti-Saloon League was more of a lobbying agency and never rallied community support for enforcement. The KKK called for punishment of bootleggers and set up the "Horse Thief Detective Association" (HTDA) to make extra-legal raids on speakeasies and gambling joints. It seldom cooperated with law enforcement or the state or federal courts. Instead gave enforcement a bad name. Arthur Gillom, a Republican elected state attorney general over Klan opposition in 1924, did not tolerate its extra-legal operations. Instead, "He stressed the dangers of citizens relinquishing their constitutional rights and personal freedoms, and emphasized the importance of representative government (at all levels), states' rights, and the concept of separation of church and state." When Rev. Shumaker proposed that "personal liberty had to be sacrificed in order to save people," Gilliom replied that surrendering power and individual freedoms was a slippery slope to centralized government and tyranny.

John Dillinger, a native of Indianapolis, began his streak of bank robberies in Indiana and the Midwest during the 1920s. He was in prison 1924 to 1933. After a return to crime, Dillinger was returned to prison the same year, but escaped with the help of his gang. His gang was responsible for multiple murders and the theft of over $300,000. Dillinger was killed by the FBI in a shootout in Chicago in 1934.

== Twentieth century ==
=== Economic modernization ===
Although industry was rapidly expanding throughout the northern part of the state, Indiana remained largely rural at the turn of the 20th century with a growing population of 2.5 million. Like much of the rest of the American Midwest, Indiana's exports and job providers remained largely agricultural until after World War I. Indiana's developing industry, backed by inexpensive natural gas from the large Trenton Gas Field, an educated population, low taxes, easy access to transportation, and business-friendly government, led Indiana to grow into one of the leading manufacturing states by the mid-1920s.

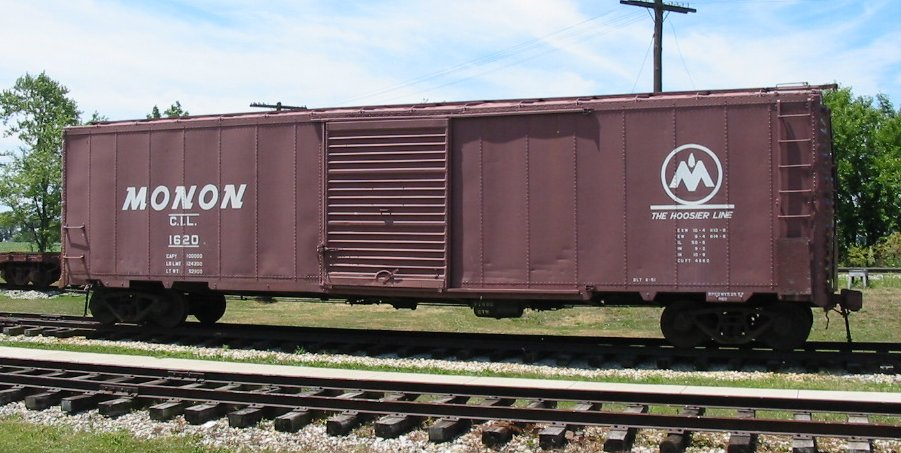
A restored Monon boxcar at the Linden Railroad Museum in Linden, Indiana

The state's central location gave it a dense network of railroads. The line most identified with the state was the Monon Line. It provided passenger service for students en route to Purdue, Indiana U. and numerous small colleges, painted its cars in school colors, and was especially popular on football weekends. The Monon was merged into larger lines in 1971, closed its passenger service, and lost its identity. Entrepreneurs built an elaborate "interurban" network of light rails to connect rural areas to shopping opportunities in the cities. They began operation in 1892, and by 1908 there were 2,300 miles of track in 62 counties. The automobile made the lines unprofitable unless the destination was Chicago. By 2001, the "South Shore" was the last one; it still operating from South Bend to Chicago.

In 1907, Indiana became the first state to adopt eugenics legislation, that allowed the involuntary sterilization of dangerous male criminals and the mentally defectives. It was never put in effect and in 1921 Indiana became the first state to rule such legislation unconstitutional when the Indiana Supreme Court acted. A revised eugenics law was passed in 1927, and it remained in effect until 1974.

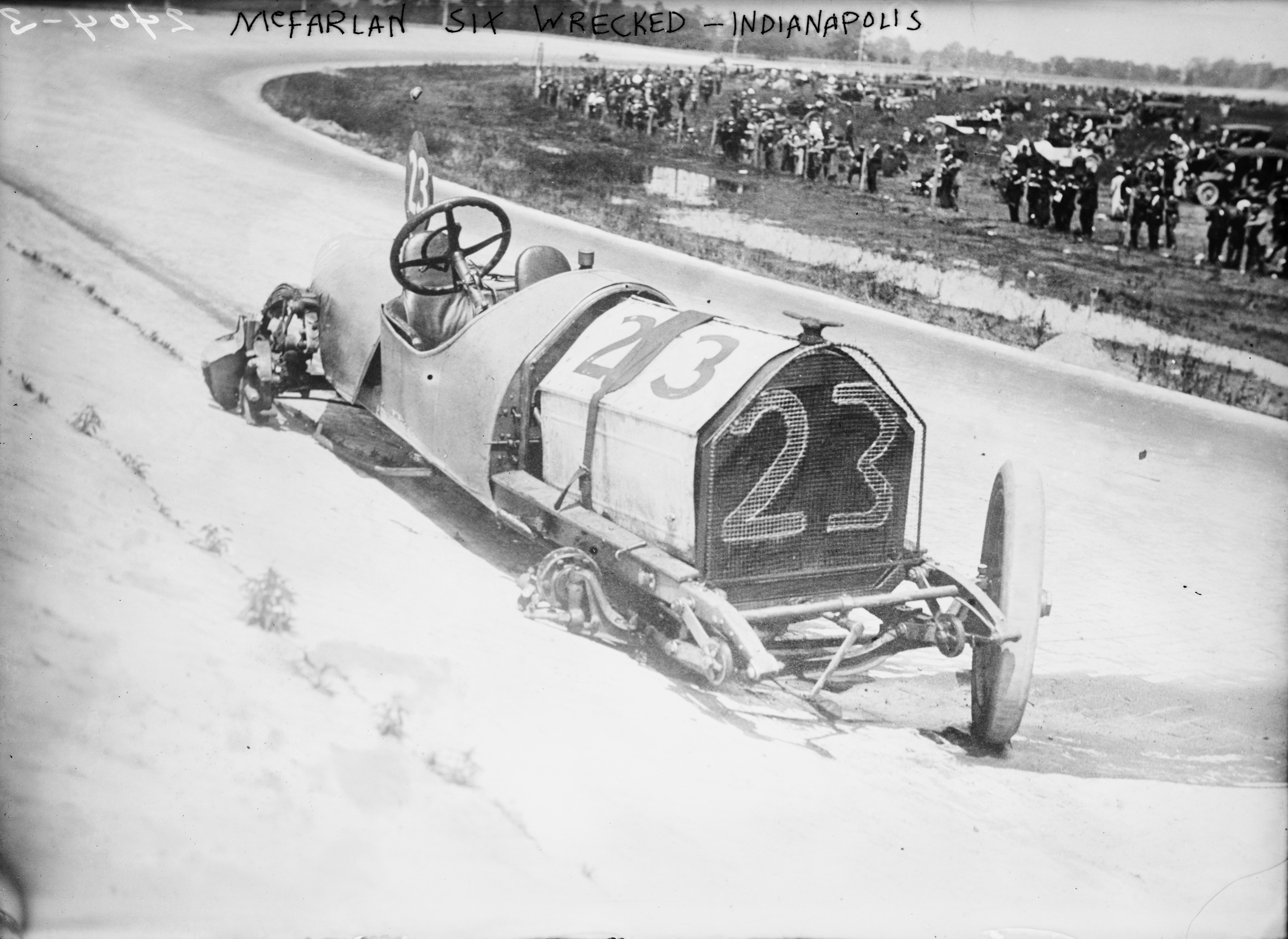
Driver Mel Marquette's wrecked McFarlan racing car at the 1912 Indianapolis 500

The Indianapolis Motor Speedway complex was built in 1909, inaugurating a new era in history. Most Indiana cities within 200 miles of Detroit became part of the giant automobile industry after 1910. The Indianapolis speedway was a venue for auto companies to show off their products. The Indianapolis 500 quickly became the standard in auto racing as European and American companies competed to build the fastest automobile and win at the track. Industrial and technological industries thrived during this era, George Kingston developed an early carburetor in 1902; in 1912, Elwood Haynes received a patent for stainless steel.

=== Statewide prohibition ===
In the first two decades of the twentieth century the Indiana Anti-Saloon League (IASL), formed in 1898 as a state auxiliary of the national Anti-Saloon League, and the Woman's Christian Temperance Union successfully organized pressure on Indiana politicians, especially members of the Republican party, to support the dry cause. The IASL, although not the first organization to take up the dry crusade in Indiana, became a key force behind efforts at attaining passage of statewide prohibition in early 1917, and rallied state support for ratification of the Eighteenth Amendment to the U.S. Constitution in 1919. The IASL's success, under the leadership of Edward S. Shumaker, an ordained Methodist minister, made it a model for the League's other state organizations. Shumaker made clear to politicians he did not care whether they drank, but insisted they vote for dry laws or face defeated in the next election by dry voters.

In 1905, passage of the Moore amendment expanded the state's Nicholson local option law to apply to all liquor license applicants within a local township or city ward. The next step was to seek countywide prohibition. The IASL appealed to the general public, holding large rallies in Indianapolis and elsewhere, to support a county option law that would provide a more restrictive ban on alcohol. In September 1908 Indiana governor J. Frank Hanly, a Methodist, Republican, and teetotaler, called for a special legislative session to establish a county option that would allow county voters to prohibit alcohol sales throughout their county. The state legislature passed the bill with only a narrow margin. By November 1909, 70 of Indiana's 92 counties were dry. In 1911, a Democratic legislative majority replaced the county option with the Proctor law, a less-geographically restrictive local option, and the number of dry counties was reduced to twenty-six. Despite the setback prohibition advocates continued to lobby legislators for support. In December 1917, several temperance organizations formed the Indiana Dry Federation to fight the politically powerful liquor interests, with the IASL joining the group a short time later. The Federation and the League vigorously campaigned for statewide prohibition, which the Indiana General Assembly adopted in February 1917. Subsequent legal challenges delayed implementation of statewide prohibition until 1918, when a court ruled in June that Indiana's prohibition law was constitutionally valid.

On January 14, 1919, Indiana became the twenty-fifth state to ratify the Eighteenth Amendment, which mandated nationwide prohibition. Three days later Nebraska became the thirty-sixth state to ratify the amendment, providing the two-thirds majority of states required to amend the U.S. Constitution. With the beginning of nationwide Prohibition on January 17, 1920, after formal ratification of the Eighteenth Amendment the previous day, efforts turned to enforcement of the new law. Protestant support for Prohibition remained intense in Indiana in the 1920s. Shumaker and the IASL lead a statewide grassroots campaign that successfully passed a new prohibition law for the state. Sponsored by Indiana representative Frank Wright and known as the Wright bone-dry law, it was enacted in 1925. The Wright law was part of a national trend toward stricter prohibition legislation and imposed severe penalties for alcohol possession.

The Great Depression and the election of Democratic party candidates in 1932 ended widespread national support for Prohibition. Franklin D. Roosevelt, who included repeal of the Eighteenth Amendment as a major issue of his presidential campaign in 1932, made good on his promise to American voters. On December 5, 1933, the Twenty-first Amendment repealed the Eighteenth Amendment and ended nationwide Prohibition. However, Indiana's legislature continued to regulate alcohol within the state through allocation of state liquor licenses and prohibition of sales on Sunday.

=== Women's organizing and activism ===
White middle-class Indiana women learned organizational skills through the suffrage and temperance movements. By the 1890s they were applying their new skills to the needs of their home communities, by organizing women's clubs, the combined literary activity with social activism focused on such needs as public health, sanitation, and good schools. Hoosier women worked at both the state and local level to materialize Progressive Era reforms. In Lafayette, for example, the suffragists concentrated in the Lafayette Franchise League, while those oriented toward social concerns worked through the Lafayette Charity Organization Society (LCOS), the Free Kindergarten and Industrial School Association (FKISA), and the Martha Home. Albion Fellows Bacon led statewide and national efforts at housing reform. A native of Evansville, Bacon worked to pass tenement and housing legislation in Indiana in 1909, 1913, and 1917. She also held leadership roles in Indiana Child Welfare Association; the Child Welfare Committee, a part of the Women's Section of the Indiana State Council of Defense; the Indiana Conference of Charities and Corrections, and the Juvenile Advisory Commission of Indiana's Probation Department. Women were given the right to vote in 1920 when the Nineteenth Amendment to the United States Constitution was ratified.

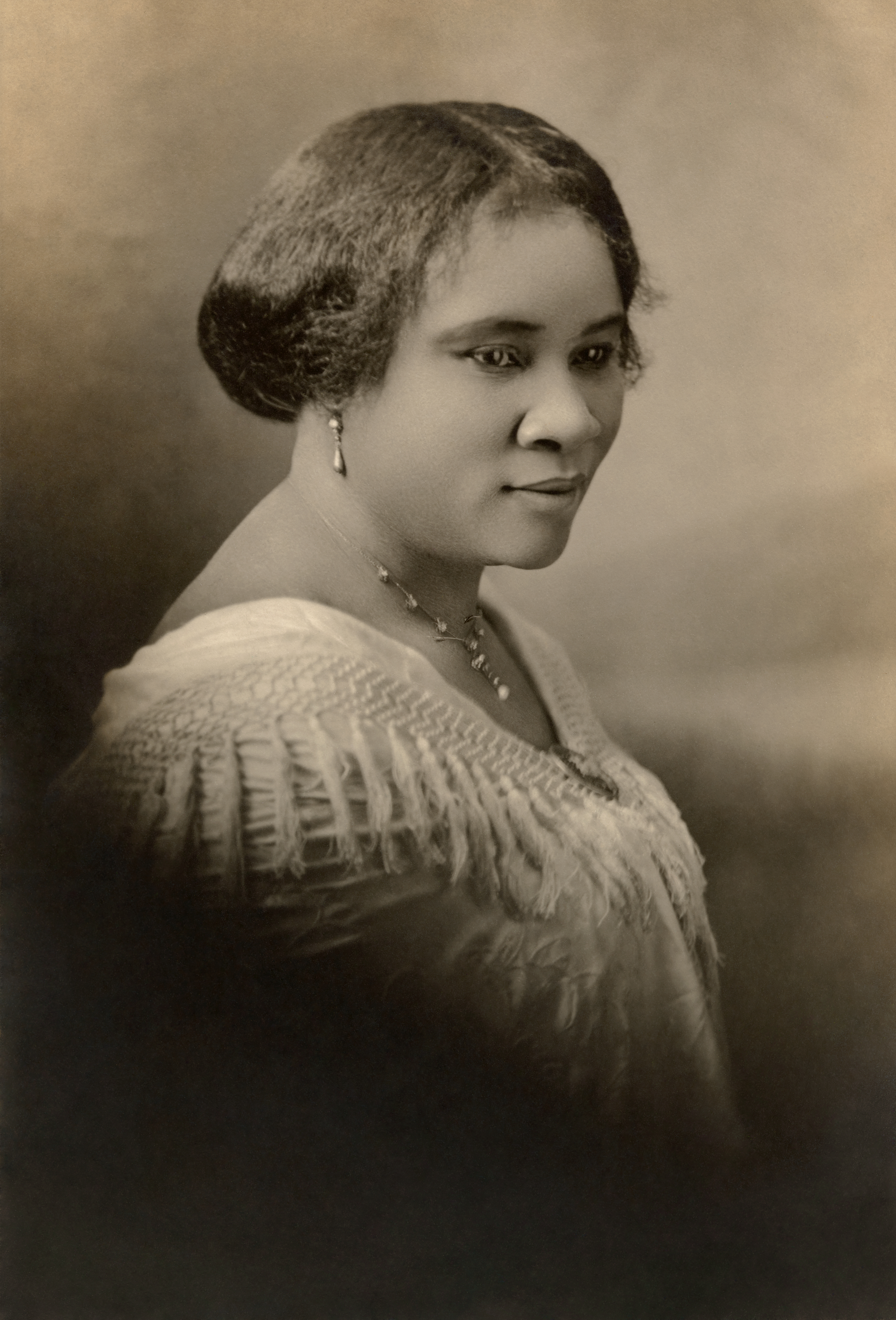
Madam C. J. Walker, Indianapolis entrepreneur and philanthropist

Middle-class Black women activists were organized through African American Baptist and Methodist churches, and under the leadership of Hallie Quinn Brown who formed a statewide umbrella group, the Indiana State Federation of Colored Women's Clubs. Racism prevented the organization from association with its white counterpart, the Indiana State Federation of Women's Clubs. White Hoosier suffragist May Wright Sewall spoke at the founding convention in a show of solidarity with Black Hoosier women. The Indiana Association of Colored Women's Clubs sponsored 56 clubs in 46 cities in the state, with 2000 members by 1933, and a budget of over $20,000. Most members were public school teachers or hairdressers, as well as women active and local business in the Black community, and in government positions. They affiliated with the National Federation of Afro-American Women, headed by Mrs. Booker T. Washington, and became part of her husband's powerful network of Black activists. One of the most prominent members in Indiana was Madam C. J. Walker of Indianapolis, who owned a nationally successful business selling beauty and hair products for Black women. Club meetings focused on home-making classes, research, and statistics regarding the status of African Americans in Indiana and nationwide, suffrage, and anti-lynching activism. The local clubs operated rescue missions, nursery schools, and educational programs.

=== Floods ===
Between March 23 and 27, 1913, Indiana and more than a dozen other states experienced major flooding during the Great Flood of 1913; it was Indiana's worst flood disaster up to that time. The weather system that created the unprecedented flooding arrived in Indiana on Sunday, March 23, with a major tornado at Terre Haute. (Note: The Terre Haute tornado killed twenty-one people, injured 250, and caused estimated damages between $1 and $2 million (in 1913 dollars). See "Indiana: Tornadoes causing 10 or more deaths". The Tornado Project. Archived from the original on March 4, 2016.) In four days, rainfall topped nine inches in southern Indiana, more than half of it falling within a twenty-four-hour period on March 25. Heavy rains, runoff, and rising rivers resulted in extensive flooding in northeast, central, and southern Indiana. (Note: Waterways were at or near crest along the Wabash River from Logansport to Attica, the White River in the Indianapolis area, and the East Fork of the White River near Columbus and Seymour. The dam at Saint Mary's reservoir, twenty-five miles from Fort Wayne broke, while high water burst levees at Indianapolis, Marion, Muncie, Lafayette, and Lawrenceburg, flooding portions of these cities and others along the Ohio, White, Wabash, and Mississinewa rivers. See "The Great Flood of 1913, 100 Years Later: The Rivers". Silver Jackets. 2013. Archived from the original on August 3, 2013. and "RetroIndy: The Great Flood of 1913". Indianapolis Star. March 22, 2013. Archived from the original on September 23, 2013. See also, Williams, p. 269, and Bell, "Forgotten Waters", p. 11.) Indiana's flood-related deaths were estimated at 100 to 200, with flood damage estimated at $25 million (in 1913 dollars). State and local communities handled their own disaster response and relief. The American Red Cross, still a small organization at that time, established a temporary headquarters in Indianapolis and served the six hardest-hit Indiana counties. Indiana governor Samuel M. Ralston appealed to Indiana cities and other states for relief assistance and appointed a trustee to receive relief funds and arrange for distribution of supplies. Independent organizations, such as the Rotary Club of Indianapolis and others, helped with local relief efforts.

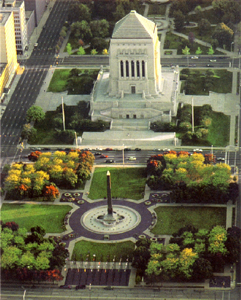
Indiana World War Memorial Plaza

=== World War I ===
Hoosiers were divided about entering World War I. Before Germany resumed unrestricted submarine warfare and tried to enlist Mexico as a military ally in 1917, most Hoosiers wanted the U.S. to be neutral in the war. Support for Britain came from professions and businessmen. Opposition came from churchmen, women, farmers and Irish Catholics and German-American elements. They called for neutrality and strongly opposed going to war to rescue the British Empire. Influential Hoosiers who opposed involvement in the war included Democratic Senator John W. Kern, and Vice President Thomas R. Marshall. Supporters of military preparedness included James Whitcomb Riley and George Ade. Most of the opposition dissipated when the United States officially declared war against Germany in April 1917, but some teachers lost their jobs on suspicion of disloyalty, and public schools could no longer teach in German. (Note: "By law all work in the elementary schools was to be done in English. Courses in the German language had been authorized by the General Assembly as early as 1869 in any public school in which twenty-five parents requested them.") Socialist leader Eugene V. Debs, from Terre Haute, went to federal prison for encouraging young men to evade the draft.

The Indiana National Guard was federalized during WWI; many units were sent to Europe. A separate organization, the Liberty Guard, was formed in 1910, primarily for social purposes: members marched in parades and at patriotic events. Governor Samuel Ralston had to call out the Liberty Guard in November 1913 to put down a growing workers strike in Indianapolis. By 1920, the state decided to formalize this group, renaming it the Indiana Civil Defense Force and supplying it with equipment and training. In 1941, the unit was named the Indiana Guard Reserve; it effectively became a state militia. During World War II, it was again federalized and members were called up by the federal government.

Indiana provided 130,670 troops during the war; a majority of them were drafted. Over 3,000 men died, many from influenza and pneumonia. To honor the Hoosier veterans of the war, the state began construction of the Indiana World War Memorial.

=== 1920s and the Great Depression ===
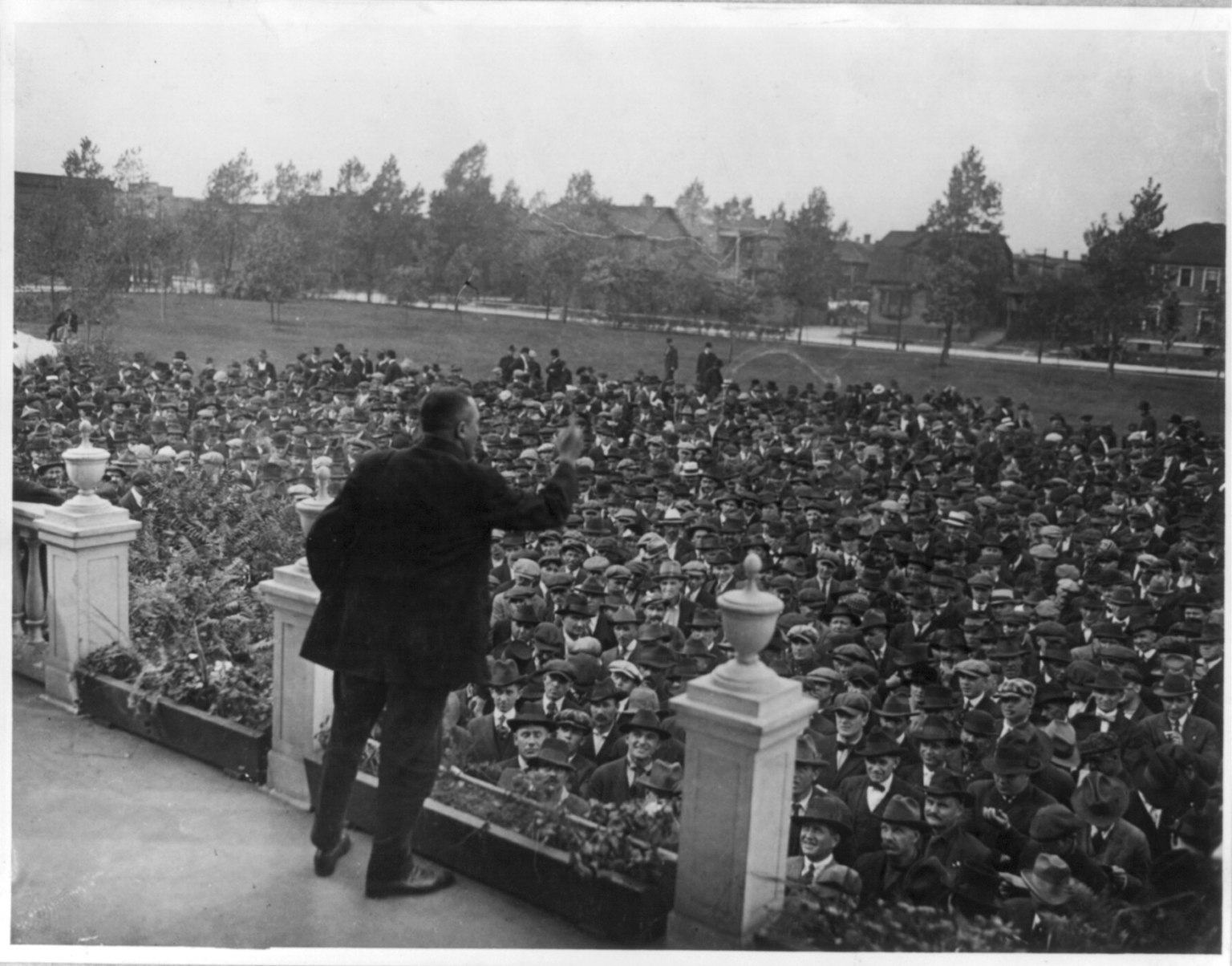
A labor leader rallies striking steelworkers in Gary, Indiana

The war-time economy provided a boom to Indiana's industry and agriculture, which led to more urbanization throughout the 1920s. By 1925, more workers were employed in industry than in agriculture in Indiana. Indiana's greatest industries were steel production, iron, automobiles, and railroad cars.

The Indiana Ku Klux Klan grew very rapidly in the early 1920s from a cross section of Protestant men. The KKK was operated for the benefit of its well-paid organizers. There was little leadership or coordination among the hundreds of local chapters. During the 1925 General Assembly session, the state Klan leader Grand Dragon D. C. Stephenson boasted, "I am the law in Indiana." The Klan demanded an anti-Catholic legislative agenda, but failed to win any significant legislation. Stephenson was convicted for the murder of Madge Oberholtzer in 1925 and sentenced to life in prison. After Governor Edward L. Jackson, whom Stephenson helped elect, refused to pardon him, Stephenson began to name many of his co-conspirators. This led the state's making a string of arrests and indictments against political leaders, including the governor, mayor of Indianapolis, the attorney general, and many others. The crackdown effectively rendered the Klan powerless and a great majority of members quit.

During the 1930s, Indiana, like the rest of the nation, was affected by the Great Depression. The economic downturn had a wide-ranging negative impact on Indiana. Urbanization declined. Governor Paul V. McNutt's administration struggled to build from scratch a state-funded welfare system to help the overwhelmed private charities. During his administration, spending and taxes were cut drastically in response to the Depression. The state government was completely reorganized. McNutt also enacted the state's first income tax. On several occasions, he declared martial law to put an end to worker strikes.

During the Great Depression, unemployment exceeded 25% statewide. Southern Indiana was hard hit, and unemployment in the coal mining districts reached 50% during the worst years, 1931–1933. The federal Works Progress Administration (WPA) began operations in Indiana in July 1935. By October of that year, the agency had put 74,708 Hoosiers to work. In 1940, there were still 64,700 people working for agency. The majority of these workers were employed to improve the state's infrastructure: roads, bridges, flood control projects, and water treatment plants. Some helped index collections of libraries, and artists were employed to create murals for post offices and libraries. Nearly every community had a project to work on.

During the 1930s, many local businesses collapsed, several railroads went bankrupt, and numerous small rural banks folded. Manufacturing came to an abrupt halt or was severely cut back due to the dwindling demand for products. The Depression continued to negatively affect Indiana until the buildup for World War II. The effects continued to be felt for many years thereafter. After 1935, labor unions grew much stronger, especially in coal, steel and rubber industries.

=== 1938–1945 ===
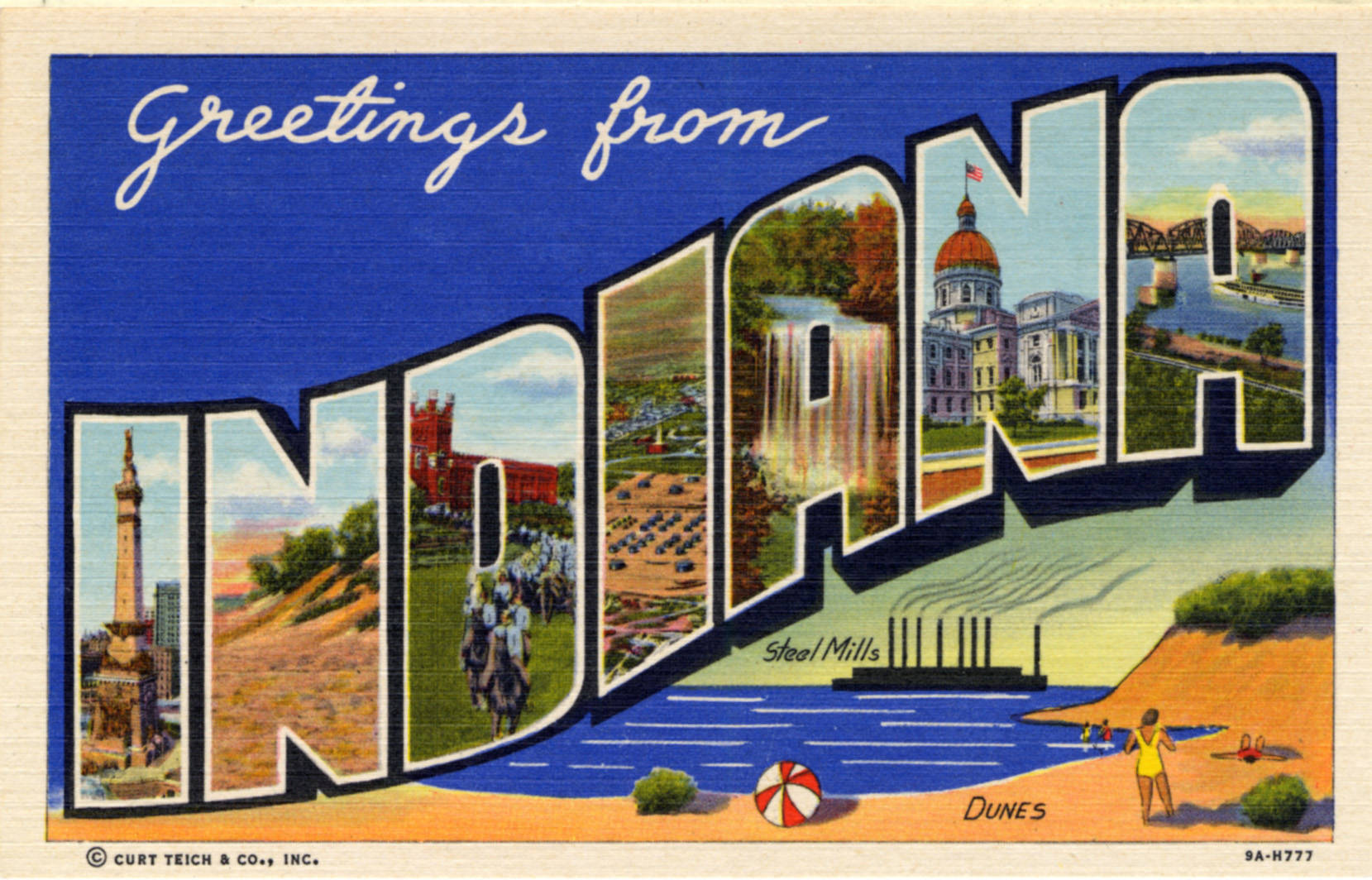
"Greetings from Indiana" large-letter postcard c. 1939

The economy began to recover in 1933, but unemployment remained high among youth and older workers until 1940, when the federal government built up supplies and armaments going into World War II.

Indiana's factories went into overdrive during World War II to support the war effort, and mass employment and prosperity returned. Indiana manufactured 4.5 percent of total United States military armaments produced during World War II, ranking eighth among the 48 states.

The state produced munitions in many plants, such as an army plant near Sellersburg. The P-47 fighter-plane was manufactured in Evansville at Republic Aviation. The steel produced in northern Indiana was used in tanks, battleships, and submarines. Other war-related materials were produced throughout the state. Indiana's military bases were activated, with areas such as Camp Atterbury reaching historical peaks in activity.

The population was highly supportive of the war efforts. The political left supported the war (unlike World War I, which Socialists opposed.) The churches showed much less pacifism than in 1914. The Church of God, based in Anderson, had a strong pacifist element, reaching a high point in the late 1930s. The Church regarded World War II as a just war because America was attacked. Anti-Communist sentiment has since kept strong pacifism from developing in the Church of God. Likewise the Quakers, with a strong base near Richmond, generally regarded World War II as a just war and about 90% served, although there were some conscientious objectors. The Mennonites and Brethren continued their pacifism, but the federal government was much less hostile than before. The churches helped their young men to both become conscientious objectors and to provide valuable service to the nation. Goshen College set up a training program for unpaid Civilian Public Service jobs. Although the young women pacifists were not liable to the draft, they volunteered for unpaid Civilian Public Service jobs to demonstrate their patriotism; many worked in mental hospitals.

The state sent nearly 400,000 Hoosiers who enlisted or were drafted. More than 11,783 Hoosiers died in the conflict and another 17,000 were wounded. Hoosiers served in all the major theaters of the war. Their sacrifice was honored by additions to the World War Memorial in Indianapolis, which was not finished until 1965.

Tens of thousands of women volunteered for war service, through agencies such as the Red Cross. Representative was Elizabeth Richardson of Mishawaka. She served coffee and doughnuts to combat soldiers in England and France from a Red Cross clubmobile. She died in a plane crash in 1945 in France.

== Since 1945 ==
During the post-World War II boom from 1945 to 1973, Indiana's economy prospered and Indiana was ranked 20th out of 50 states plus Washington, D.C. in the late-1960s for personal income. However, Indiana's economy began to struggle after the recession of 1969–1970 as the manufacturing sector began to decline. Foreign competition, corporate mergers, automation, and new management strategies lead to downsizing, mass layoffs, diversification, and chronic unemployment. Cities such as Muncie, Anderson, Indianapolis, Kokomo, Gary, East Chicago, Hammond, Michigan City, Fort Wayne, South Bend, Elkhart, and Evansville all witnessed population declines and rising unemployment and poverty during the 1970s and 1980s. Northwest Indiana was hit especially by the steel crisis of 1974 – 1983.

=== Black Hoosiers and redlining ===
Redlining, or the discriminatory and exclusionary housing practice meant to separate affluent white populations from low-income racial groups, was a form of forced migration and relocation that many Black communities experienced during the twentieth-century. For example, the Indiana Avenue community on the west side of downtown Indianapolis was displaced by the building of Indiana University Purdue University Indianapolis (IUPUI) in the sixties.

== Twenty-first century ==
Central Indiana was struck by a major flood in 2008, leading to widespread damage and the evacuations of hundreds of thousands of residents. It was the costliest disaster in the history of the state, with early damage estimates topping $1 billion.

Since the early-1990s, Indiana has diversified its economy away from heavy industry and towards service (such as banking, insurance, healthcare, education, financial services, information technology) and high-tech manufacturing. In 2016, 516,000 workers were employed in manufacturing, down from 696,000 in 2000 and nearly 750,000 in 1969, but up from 424,000 in 2009 at the depths of the Great Recession. Heavy industries such as oil, autos, and steel still comprise a significant portion of the states' GDP, but other industries such as electrical goods, medical equipment, and pharmaceuticals have grown recently as well. However, Indiana's wage growth has lagged behind other states, and Indiana has fallen from 20th in personal income during the 1960s to 39th in 2017.

In 2012, Indiana's exports totaled $34.4 billion, a record high for the state. The rate of export growth in 2012 was faster in Indiana than it was for the nation.

In 2021, Indiana was the third-largest auto-producing state in the U.S. The state also became a hub for advanced manufacturing, especially of electrical vehicles and batteries, as well as aerospace and defense products. Like the rest of the country, Indiana was hit hard by the Great Recession of 2008–2009. The state saw high unemployment rates and a drop in manufacturing output during this time. Since the recession, Indiana has focused on diversifying its economy to reduce reliance on manufacturing.

== See also ==
- Economy of Indiana#History for economic history
- History of the Midwestern United States
- Indiana Historical Society
- Indiana Register of Historic Sites and Structures
- Indiana State Library and Historical Bureau
- List of battles fought in Indiana
- List of governors of Indiana
- List of historical societies in Indiana
- List of State Historic Sites in Indiana
- List of National Historic Landmarks in Indiana
- National Register of Historic Places listings in Indiana

== Bibliography ==
=== Surveys ===
- Boomhower, Ray E.; Jones, Darryl, photographer (2000). Destination Indiana: Travels through Hoosier History. Indianapolis: Indiana Historical Society. ISBN 978-0871951472.
- Dunn, Jacob Piatt (1919). Indiana and Indianans. Vol. V.I. Chicago & New York: The American Historical Society., biographies
- Federal Writers' Project (1941). Indiana: A Guide to the Hoosier State. New York: Oxford University Press. covers many themes and most localities
- Funk, Arville L. (1983) [1969]. A Sketchbook of Indiana History. Rochester, Indiana: Christian Book Press.
- Gray, Ralph D. (1980). The Hoosier State: Readings in Indiana History. Eerdmans 800pp. ISBN 9780608205458. (2 vols.)
- Gray, Ralph D (1995). Indiana History: A Book of Readings. Indiana University Press. ISBN 978-0-253-32629-4. (abridged version)
- Gugin, Linda C.; St. Clair, James E., eds. (2006). The Governors of Indiana. Indianapolis: Indiana Historical Society Press and the Indiana Historical Bureau. ISBN 0-87195-196-7.
- Gugin, Linda C.; St. Clair, James E., eds. (2015). Indiana's 200: The People Who Shaped the Hoosier State. Indianapolis: Indiana Historical Society. ISBN 978-0-87195-387-2.
- Madison, James (2014). Hoosiers: A New History of Indiana. Bloomington and Indianapolis: Indiana University Press and the Indiana Historical Society Press. ISBN 978-0-253-01308-8.
- Madison, James H. (1990). The Indiana Way: A State History (Midland Book ed.). Bloomington and Indianapolis: Indiana University Press and Indiana Historical Society. ISBN 978-0-253-20609-1.
- Madison, James H.; Sandweiss, Lee Ann (2014). Hoosiers and the American Story. Indianapolis: Indiana Historical Society Press. ISBN 978-0-87195-363-6.
- Peckham, Howard Henry (2003). Indiana: A History. University of Illinois Press. ISBN 978-0-252-07146-1. excerpt and text search
- Rudolph. L. C. (1995). Hoosier Faiths: A History of Indiana Churches and Religious Groups. Bloomington and Indianapolis: Indiana University Press. ISBN 978-0253328823.
- Streightoff, Frances Doan. Indiana: A Social and Economic Survey (1916) full text online
- Taylor Jr. Robert M.; Erroll Wayne Stevens; Mary Ann Ponder; Paul Brockman (1989). Indiana: A New Historical Guide. Indianapolis: Indiana Historical Society. ISBN 0871950499.

=== Native Americans ===
- Allison, Harold (1986). The Tragic Saga of the Indiana Indians. Paducah: Turner Publishing Company. ISBN 978-0-938021-07-0.
- Carter, Harvey Lewis (1987). The Life and Times of Little Turtle: First Sagamore of the Wabash. Urbana: U. of Illinois Press. ISBN 978-0-252-01318-8.
- Dowd, Gregory Evans (1992). A Spirited Resistance: The North American Indian Struggle for Unity, 1745–1815. Baltimore: Johns Hopkins U.P. ISBN 978-0-8018-4236-8.
- Fowler, William M. (2005). Empires at War. New York: Walker & Company. ISBN 978-0-8027-1411-4.
- Jennings, Francis (1990). The Ambiguous Iroquois Empire. W. W. Norton & Company. ISBN 978-0-393-30302-5.
- Pocock, Tom (1998). Battle for Empire. The very first world war 1756–63. London: Michael O'Mara Books Limited. ISBN 978-1-84067-324-1.
- United States Department of Agriculture, Forest Service (2006). Looking at Prehistory: Indiana's Hoosier National Forest Region, 12,000 B.C. to 1650. Washington: Government Printing Office.

=== Pre-1900 ===
- Barker, Brett, et al. Union Heartland: The Midwestern Home Front during the Civil War (SIU Press, 2013).
- Barnhart, John D.; Riker, Dorothy L (1971). Indiana to 1816. The Colonial Period. Indianapolis: Indiana Historical Society. ISBN 978-0871951083.
- Bigham, Darrel E., ed. (2001). Indiana Territory, 1800–2000. A Bicentennial Perspective. Indianapolis: Indiana Historical Society.
- Buley, R. Carlyle (1951). The Old Northwest: Pioneer Period, 1815–1840. Vol. I and II. Indianapolis: Indiana Historical Society. (a Pulitzer Prize winner)
- Carmony, Donald Francis. Indiana, 1816 to 1850: The Pioneer Era (1998), 924 pp excerpt and text search
- Cayton, Andrew R. L. Frontier Indiana. 1996. 340 pp.
- Cleaves, Freeman (1939). Old Tippecanoe: William Henry Harrison and His Time. New York: Scribner's.
- English, William Hayden (1896). Conquest of the Country Northwest of the River Ohio, 1778–1783, and Life of Gen. George Rogers Clark. Vol. 1&2. Indianapolis: Bowen-Merrill.
- Etcheson, Nicole. A Generation at War: The Civil War Era in a Northern Community (2011); Putnam County
- Fuller, A. James. Oliver P. Morton and the Politics of the Civil War and Reconstruction (Kent State University Press, 2017)
- Funk, Arville L (1967). Hoosiers In The Civil War. Chicago: Adams Press. ISBN 978-0-9623292-5-8.
- Haymond, William S (1879). An Illustrated History of the State of Indiana: Being a Full and Authentic Civil and Political History of the State from Its First Exploration Down to 1879. Including an Account of the Commercial, Agricultural, and Educational growth of Indiana. With Historical and Descriptive Sketches of the Cities, Towns and Villages, Embracing Interesting Narratives of Pioneer Life, Together with Biographical Sketches and Portraits of the Prominent Men of the Past and Present, and a History of Each County Separately. S.L. Marrow & Co.
- Levering, Julia Henderson (1909). Historic Indiana: Being Chapters in the Story of the Hoosier State from the Romantic Period of Foreign Exploration and Dominion Through Pioneer Days, Stirring War Times, and Periods of Peaceful Progress, to the Present Time. New York: G. P. Putnam's sons.
- Morgan, Anita. "“The Responsibilities of a Community at War": County and State Government Aid to Hoosier Soldiers' Families during the Civil War." Indiana Magazine of History 113.1 (2017): 48–77. online
- Nevins, Allan (1947). Ordeal of the Union: A House Dividing 1852–1857. Vol. V.II. New York: Charles Scribner's Sons.
- Onuf, Peter S. "Democracy, Empire, and the 1816 Constitution," Indiana Magazine of History 111 (March 2015), pp: 5-29.
- Rosenberg, Morton M. (1968). The Politics of Pro-Slavery Sentimental in Indiana 1816–1861. Muncie, Indiana: Ball State University.
- Thornbrough, Emma (1991). Indiana in the Civil War Era: 1850–1880. Indianapolis: Indiana Historical Society. ISBN 978-0-87195-050-5.
- Troyer, Byron L (1975). Yesterday's Indiana. Miami, Florida: E.A. Seemann Publishing. ISBN 978-0-912458-55-7.

=== Since 1900 ===
- Barrows, Robert G. Albion Fellows Bacon: Indiana's Municipal Housekeeper. 2000. 229 pp.
- Gresham, Matilda (1919). Life of Walter Quintin Gresham, 1832–1895. Chicago: Rand McNally and Company.
- Max Parvin Cavnes. The Hoosier community at war (1961); encyclopedic coverage of the state in World War II
- Lutholtz, M. William (1991). Grand Dragon: D. C. Stephenson and the Ku Klux Klan in Indiana. West Lafayette, Indiana: Purdue University Press. ISBN 978-1-55753-046-2.
- Madison, James H. Indiana through Tradition and Change: A History of the Hoosier State and Its People, 1920-1945 (1982) excerpt and text search
- Phillips, Clifton J (1968). Indiana in Transition: The Emergence of an Industrial Commonwealth, 1880–1920. The History of Indiana. Vol. 4. Indianapolis: Indiana Historical Bureau and Indiana Historical Society.

=== Local and regional ===
- Findling, John, ed. (2003). A History of New Albany, Indiana. New Albany, Indiana: Indiana University Southeast.
- Goodrich, De Witt C.; Tuttle, Charles Richard (1875). An Illustrated History of the State of Indiana. Unknown: R. S. Peale & co.
- Law, Judge (1858). The Colonial History of Vincennes. Vincennes: Harvey, Mason and Company. (Reproduced 2006.)
- Miller, Harold V. (1938). "Industrial Development of New Albany, Indiana". Economic Geography. New York: Wiley.
- Mohl, Raymond A.; Betten, Neil (1986). Steel City: Urban and Ethnic Patterns in Gary, Indiana, 1906–1950. Archived from the original on March 7, 2016 – via Questia.
- Moore, Powell A. The Calumet Region, Indiana's Last Frontier (1959), scholarly study of Gary and Lake County
- Morris, Ronald V. Yountsville: The Rise and Decline of an Indiana Mill Town (U of Notre Dame Press, 2019) online review
- Skertic, Mark, and John J. Watkins. A Native's Guide to Northwest Indiana (2003) excerpt and text search
- Taylor, Robert M. Jr. et al. Indiana: A New Historical Guide (1989)
- WPA Indiana Writer's Project. Indiana: A Guide To The Hoosier State: American Guide Series (1941), famous WPA Guide to every location; strong on history, architecture and culture; reprinted 1973; online edition Archived May 27, 2012, at the Wayback Machine

=== Politics ===
- Bowen, Otis R. and DuBois, William Jr. Doc: Memories from a Life in Public Service. (2000). 232 pp. Bowen was Governor 1972–80
- Braeman, John. Albert J.Beveridge: American Nationalist (1971)
- Fadely, James Philip. Thomas Taggart: Public Servant, Political Boss, 1856–1929. 1997. 267 pp.
- Finkelman, Paul. "Almost a Free State: The Indiana Constitution of 1816 and the Problem of Slavery," Indiana Magazine of History, 111 (March 2015), 64–95.
- Gray, Ralph D (1977). Gentlemen from Indiana: National Party Candidates,1836–1940. Indianapolis: Indiana Historical Bureau. ISBN 978-1-885323-29-3.
- Gresham, Matilda (1919). Life of Walter Quintin Gresham 1832–1895. New York City: Rand McNally & company.
- Hyneman, Charles; et al. (1979). Voting in Indiana: A Century of Persistence and Change. Indiana U.P. ISBN 9780253172839., voting patterns
  - review essay by Paul Kleppner in JSTOR
- Jensen, Richard J. The Winning of the Midwest: Social and Political Conflict, 1888–1896 (1971) online
- Mills, Randy K. Jonathan Jennings: Indiana's First Governor (2005), 259 pp.
- Moore, Leonard J. (1991). Citizen Klansmen: The Ku Klux Klan in Indiana, 1921–1928. Archived from the original on October 2, 2015 – via Questia.
- Sievers, Harry J. Benjamin Harrison, Hoosier Warrior: 1833–1865 (1952); Benjamin Harrison, Hoosier Statesmen: from the Civil War to the White House 1865 – 1888 (1959); Benjamin Harrison, Hoosier President: The White House and After (1968)
- Stampp, Kenneth M. Indiana Politics during the Civil War (1949) online edition Archived May 27, 2012, at the Wayback Machine

=== Economic, social and cultural history ===
- Campney, Brent MS. " ' This Negro Elephant is Getting to be a Pretty Large Sized Animal': White Hostility against Blacks in Indiana and the Historiography of Racist Violence in the Midwest." Middle West Review 1.2 (2015): 63–91. online
- Divita, James J. (1989). The Italian Immigrant Experience in Indiana.
- Giffin, William W. The Irish: Peopling Indiana. 2006. 127 pp.
- Lantzer, Jason S. (2009). Prohibition is Here to Stay: The Reverend Edward S. Shumaker and the Dry Crusade in Indiana. Notre Dame, Indiana: University of Notre Dame Press. ISBN 978-0-268-03383-5.
- Reese, William J., ed. Hoosier Schools: Past and Present (1998)
- Robinson, Kyle Brent. "Seeking a Hoosier Home: Black Migration to Indiana and the Politics of Belonging." CONCEPT 34 (2010) online
- Rudolph, L. C. Hoosier Faiths: A History of Indiana's Churches and Religious Groups (1995), 710 pp.
- Rund, Christopher. The Indiana Rail Road Company: America's New Regional Railroad (2006). 254 pp.
- Simons, Richard S. and Parker, Francis H., eds. Railroads of Indiana (1997) 297 pp.
- Taylor, Robert M. Jr. and McBirney, Connie A., ed. Peopling Indiana: The Ethnic Experience. 1996. 703 pp. covers every major ethnic group
- Teaford, Jon C. Cities of the heartland: The rise and fall of the industrial Midwest (Indiana University Press, 1993). online
- Thornbrough, Emma Lou. The negro in Indiana : a study of a minority (1957) online
- Thornbrough, Emma Lou. Indiana Blacks in the Twentieth Century. (Indiana U. Press, 2000). 287 pp. online
- Thornbrough, Emma Lou. The Negro in Indiana before 1900: A Study of a Minority (1993)
- Thornbrough, Emma Lou. "Segregation in Indiana during the Klan Era of the 1920s," Mississippi Valley Historical Review (1961) 47#4 pp. 594–618 in JSTOR
- Vanausdall, Jeanette. Pride and Protest: The Novel in Indiana. 1999. 169 pp.
- Whitford, Frederick and Martin, Andrew G. The Grand Old Man of Purdue University and Indiana Agriculture: A Biography of William Carroll Latta (Purdue U. Press, 2005), 385 pp.
- Witkowski, Gregory R. ed. Hoosier Philanthropy: A State History of Giving (Indiana UP, 2022) online book review

=== Primary sources ===
- Cutler, Jervis; Le Raye, Charles (1971) [1812]. A Topographical Description of the State of Ohio, Indiana Territory, and Louisiana. Arnot Press. ISBN 978-0-405-02839-7.
- WPA Indiana Writer's Project. Indiana: A Guide To The Hoosier State: American Guide Series (1941), famous WPA Guide to every location; strong on history, architecture and culture; reprinted 1973; online edition Archived May 27, 2012, at the Wayback Machine

=== Historiography ===
- Campney, Brent MS. " ' This Negro Elephant is Getting to be a Pretty Large Sized Animal': White Hostility against Blacks in Indiana and the Historiography of Racist Violence in the Midwest." Middle West Review 1.2 (2015): 63–91. online
- Gabin, Nancy. "Fallow Yet Fertile: The Field of Indiana Women's History," Indiana Magazine of History (2000) 96#3 pp 213–249
- Jensen, Richard J. et al. Local History Today (Indiana Historical Society, 1980)
- Price, Barton E. "In Memory of Andrew RL Cayton: A Historiographical Essay." Indiana Magazine of History 112.4 (2016): 385–392. online
- Taylor, Robert M. ed. The State of Indiana History 2000: Papers Presented at the Indiana Historical Society's Grand Opening (2001) excerpt and text search
- "Teaching Indiana History: A Roundtable." Indiana Magazine of History (2011) 107#3 pp 250–261 online
