= Marion Harvie Barnard =

Suffragist

- Born: Marion Harvie; September 8, 1872; Cheshire, England
- Died: March 5, 1969 (aged 96); Indianapolis, Indiana, US
- Occupations: suffragette, teacher
- Years active: 1905–1920

Marion Harvie Barnard (September 8, 1872 – March 5, 1969) was a British-American suffragist. She was a member of the Woman's Franchise League of Indiana and the treasurer of the Indiana Equal Suffrage Association.

== Personal life ==
Marion Harvie was born September 8, 1872 Cheshire, England to Thomas and Elizabeth (Watt) Harvie. She immigrated to the United States in the 1890s, with her sister Alice Harvie Duden.

On 20 June 1901 in Rhode Island, Harvie married Harry Everett Barnard and the couple moved to New Hampshire, where Harry worked as a chemist for the State Board of Health.

In 1905, the couple moved to Indianapolis, Indiana. Barnard became involved in reviving the defunct Indiana suffragist movement. They later had two children. Barnard died 5 March 1969 in Indianapolis and was buried at Washington Park East Cemetery in Indianapolis.

== Career and education ==
Harvie taught at a private girls' school in New England before attending Brown University from 1898 to 1902. She graduated Phi Beta Kappa with a degree in philosophy.

At a meeting held in May, 1906, in Kokomo, she was elected to serve as treasurer of the Indiana Auxiliary of the National American Woman Suffrage Association. At a suffrage convention held between 16 and 17 March 1909 in Logansport, Barnard was re-elected treasurer. Barnard was still serving as treasurer of the Indiana Auxiliary in 1914 and archival records at the Indiana Historical Society show she had correspondence with Carrie Chapman Catt.

In 1909, the Woman's Franchise League of Indiana was formed to try to get a woman elected on the school board. Barnard was a member of the organization, and a member of the Irvington Women's Club. The Women's Club was involved in sanitation efforts such as cleaning up markets and groceries, safe drinking water, and waste disposal. Her husband, who was the director of the Indiana State Food and Drug Commission, supported these efforts. closing down bakeries and unsanitary businesses that handled food.

Barnard also started the Indianapolis Social Register and was one of the founding members of the Irvington Dancing Club.
