= George Kingston (carburetor) =

American engineer (1863-1946)

George Kingston (March 22, 1863 – February 21, 1946) was the inventor of the Kingston carburetor in 1902, in Kokomo, Indiana.

== Biography ==
Kingston was born in Michigan. He married Alina Vincent in Ovid, Michigan, and had one son, Ralph, born December 25, 1905. The Kingstons bought the Seiberling Mansion in Kokomo in 1914, which was later the location of Indiana University Kokomo, and is now the home of the Howard County Museum and Howard County Historical Society.

He came to Kokomo, Howard County, Indiana in 1901 and first worked for the Ford and Donnelly Foundry, (which had made the first aluminum casting in 1895). Along with Charles T. Byrne, he founded Byrne, Kingston & Company, which manufactured carburetors, automotive accessories, appliances and other instruments.^{1} The Company later became known as Kingston Products, and also manufactured such things as Roller Skates, Radios and toys sold under the Kokomo Toys brand. The toys became particularly popular in the 1920s and 1930s with fire engines, trucks and various toy cars. Kingston was sold in 1967 to the Scott & Fetzer Company, now The Scott Fetzer Company, which itself is now a part of Berkshire Hathaway.

Kokomo Electric Company was established to manufacture spark coils and spark plugs for automobiles, and other ignition and electrical related goods. Kingston, Byrne, James F. Ryan and others were shareholders in this company.^{2}

The Kokomo Brass Company, a plumber-fitting company, also listed Mr. Kingston as an instrumental member.^{3}

== Sources ==
^{1},^{2},^{3} - "History Of Howard County Indiana, Vol. II" by Jackson Morrow.
